= List of browser games =

This is a selected list of browser games, playable in internet browsers or with software such as Adobe Flash.

== Single-player games ==
Name	Developer	Release (Note: Available to the public)	Genre	Engine
3rd World Farmer	Frederik Hermund et al.	2006	Simulation	Flash
1000 Days of Syria	Mitch Swenson	2014	Text adventure	HTML
Absurdle	qntm	2022	Puzzle, word	
Achievement Unlocked	John Cooney	2008	Platform	Flash
Aether	Tyler Glaiel, Edmund McMillen	2008	Puzzle	Flash
Against All Odds	United Nations High Commissioner for Refugees	2005	Educational	Flash
Akinator	Elokence	2007	Twenty Questions	Limule
Alien Hominid	Tom Fulp, Dan Paladin	2002	Shooter	Flash
Auditorium	Elokence	2008	Puzzle, music	Flash
Bloody Fun Day	Urban Squall	2009	Puzzle	Flash
Bloons	Ninja Kiwi	2007	Puzzle	Flash
Bloons Tower Defense	Ninja Kiwi	2007	Tower defense	Flash
Bloxorz	DX Interactive	2007	Puzzle	Flash
Bundesfighter II Turbo	Colour Colliders	2017	Fighting	Unity
Candy Box!	aniwey	2013	Incremental game	JavaScript
Castle of Heroes	Snail Game	2009	Real-time strategy	Flash
Chronotron	Scarybug Games	2008	Platform, Puzzle	Flash
Clicker Heroes	Playsaurus	2014	Incremental	Flash
Closure	Tyler Glaiel, Jon Schubbe	2009	Puzzle	Flash
Cookie Clicker	Julien Thiennot	2013	Incremental	JavaScript
Corpse Craft: Incident at Weardd Academy	Three Rings Design	2008	Real-time strategy	Flash
Cursor*10	Nekogames	2008	Puzzle	Flash
Desktop Tower Defense	Paul Preece	2007	Tower defense	Flash
Diamond Mine	PopCap Games	2000	Puzzle	Java
Dinosaur Game	Google	2014	Endless runner	JavaScript/HTML5
Don't Look Back	Terry Cavanagh	2009	Platform	Flash
Doodle Champion Island Games	Google, Studio 4°C	2021	Sports, RPG	JavaScript
Dys4ia	Anna Anthropy	2012	Minigame compilation	Flash
Emogame	Jason Oda	2002	Action	Flash
Encyclopedia Fuckme and the Case of the Vanishing Entree	Anna Anthropy	2011	Dating sim	
Epic Saga: Extreme Fighter	Double Fine Productions, Klint Honeychurch	2007	Fighting	Flash
Every Day the Same Dream	Molleindustria	2009	Adventure	Flash
Exploit	Gregory Weir	2008	Puzzle	Flash
Fancy Pants Adventures	Borne Games	2006	Platform	Flash
Fantastic Contraption	Colin Northway	2008	Puzzle	Flash
Fallen London	Failbetter Games	2009	Adventure	
Fireboy and Watergirl	Oslo Albet	2009	Puzzle, Platform	Flash
Flash Element TD	David Scott	2007	Tower defense	Flash
Flow	Thatgamecompany	2006	Life simulation	Flash
Fly Guy	Trevor van Meter	2002	Graphic adventure	Flash
Friday Night Funkin'	The Funkin' Crew Inc.	2020	Rhythm	HaxeFlixel
Frog Fractions	Twinbeard Studios	2012	Edutainment	Flash
Gamma Bros	PixelJAM Games	2006	Shoot 'em up	Flash
GeoGuessr	Anton Wallén	2013	Quiz	
GIRP	Bennett Foddy	2011	Sports	Flash
Google Feud	Justin Hook	2013	Quiz	JavaScript
Grimace's Birthday	Krool Toys	2023	Platform	
GROW	On	2002	Puzzle	Flash
Happy Wheels	Fancy Force	2010	Platform, physics	Flash
Heardle	Omakase Studios	2022–2023	Word game	
Horse Isle	Joe and Miranda Durbin	2007	MMORPG	Flash
Hoshi Saga	Nekogames	2007	Puzzle	Flash
Hunted Forever	Evan Miller	2008	Platform	Flash
The Impossible Quiz	Splapp-me-do	2007	Quiz game	Flash
Infinite Craft	Neal Agarwal	2024	Sandbox	Together AI
I Wish I Were the Moon	Daniel Benmergui	2008	Puzzle	Flash
Kaboom: The Suicide Bombing Game	fabulous999	2002	Shooter	Flash
Kanye Zone	Otter Spice Productions	2012	Action	JavaScript/HTML5
Kingdom of Loathing	Zack "Jick" Johnson, Asymmetric Publications	2003	Text-based, MMORPG	PHP
Kingdom Rush	Ironhide Game Studio	2011	Strategy	Flash
Letter Boxed	Sam Ezersky	2019	Word game	
Line Rider	Boštjan Čadež	2006	Non-game	Flash
Magic Cat Academy	Google	2016	Adventure, strategy	
Magic Cat Academy 2	Google	2020	Adventure, strategy	
The Majesty of Colors	Gregory Weir	2008	Puzzle	Flash
Mata Nui Online Game	Templar Studios	2001	Point-and-click adventure game	Flash
Moderator Mayhem	Copia, Leveraged Play	2023	Casual	
Monster Milktruck	Google Earth	2008	Racing	Google Earth engine
MouseHunt	HitGrab Inc.	2008	RPG, idle game	PHP
N	Metanet Software	2004	Platform	Flash
Nerdle	Richard Mann, Marcus Tettmar	2022	Puzzle	
Neurocracy	Playthroughline	2021	Interactive fiction, alternate reality game	HTML
The New York Times Connections	The New York Times Games	2023	Word game	
The New York Times Spelling Bee	Frank Longo	2018	Word game	
Notpron	David Münnich	2004	Puzzle	
Nyrthos	Beer Deer Games	2014	Point-and-click game, RPG	Flash
Off-Road Velociraptor Safari	Flashbang Studios	2008	Vehicular combat	Unity
Pac-Man Doodle	Bandai Namco Entertainment, Google	2010	Maze	Flash
The Password Game	Neal Agarwal	2023	Puzzle	
Pico's School	Tom Fulp	1999	Adventure	Flash
Poptropica	Jeff Kinney	2007	Children's role play game	Flash
Quake Live	id Software	2007	First-person shooter	id Tech 3
Queers in Love at the End of the World	Anna Anthropy	2013	Interactive fiction	Twine
Quordle	Freddie Meyer	2022	Word game	
QWOP	Bennett Foddy	2008	Sports	Flash/HTML5
Rat Chaos	Winter Lake	2012	Interactive fiction	Twine
RAZE	AddisonR, Juice-Tin	2010	Shooter	Flash
The Republia Times	Lucas Pope	2012	Simulation	Flixel
The Room Tribute	Tom Fulp	2010	Point-and-click game, RPG	Flash
Samorost	Amanita Design	2003	Adventure, Puzzle	Flash
Scary Maze Game	Jeremy Winterrowd	2004	Puzzle	Flash
Shift	Antony Lavelle	2008	Platform, puzzle	Flash
Spewer	Edmund McMillen, Eli Piilonen	2009	Platform, Puzzle	Flash
Stimulation Clicker	Neal Agarwal	2025	Incremental	
Surf	Microsoft	2020	Casual	JavaScript/HTML5
Sweatshop	Littleloud, Channel Four Television	2011	Tower defense	
Swords and Sandals	Whiskeybarrel Studios	2005	Fighting	Flash
Tanki Online	AlternativaPlatform	2009	3D Action, Shooter	Flash, AlternativaPlatform
Today I Die	Daniel Benmergui	2008	Puzzle	Flash
The Uncle Who Works for Nintendo	Michael Lutz	2014	Text adventure	Twine
Warfare 1917	Armor Games	2008	Strategy	Flash
Web Sudoku	Gideon Greenspan and Rachel Lee	2005	Logic	
Winnie the Pooh's Home Run Derby	Walt Disney Japan	2007	Sports	Flash
Wonderputt	Damp Gnat	2011	Sports	
Wordle	Josh Wardle	2021	Word game	
Worldle	Antoine Teuf	2022	Puzzle	
Yetisports: Pingu Throw	Edelweiss Medienwerkst	2004	Sports	Flash
You Are Jeff Bezos	Kris Lorischild	2018	Interactive fiction	Twine
You Have to Burn the Rope	Mazapan	2008	Platform	Flash

== Multiplayer games ==
This is a selected list of multiplayer browser games. These games are usually free, with extra, payable options sometimes available.

The game flow of the games may be either turn-based, where players are given a number of "turns" to execute their actions or real-time, where player actions take a real amount of time to complete. Most notable is the real-time strategy genre.

Name	Developer	Release (Note: Available to the public)	Type	Game flow	Setting
8Realms	Jagex	2011 (now closed)	Strategy	Real-time	Empire building
Adventure Quest Worlds	Artix Entertainment	2008	MMORPG	Real-time	RPG
Agar.io	Matheus Valadares	2015	Action	Real-time	Minimalist color circles
Blaseball	The Game Band	2020 (now closed)	Sports game	Real-time	Absurdist baseball
Blood Wars	BW Team	2006	MMORPG	Real-time	Post-apocalyptic world
Bundesfighter II Turbo	Colour Colliders	2017	Fighting	Real-time	Germany during the 2017 federal election
Castle of Heroes	SNAIL Game	2009	Strategy	Real-time	Fantasy/empire building
Club Penguin	New Horizon Entertainment/Disney	2005 (now closed)	Social networking	Real-time	Antarctica
Command & Conquer: Tiberium Alliances	EA Phenomic	2012	Strategy	Real-time	Military science fiction
Crypto: The Game	Uniswap	2024	Reality competition, Social networking	Real-time	Crypto-native survival game
Dead Frontier	Neil Yates	2008	MMORPG, Third-person shooter	Real-time	Post-apocalyptic world
Diep.io	Matheus Valadares	2016	Action, Shoot 'em up	Real-time	Minimalist 2D arena
Disney's Virtual Magical Kingdom	Disney	2005 (now closed)	Virtual park	Real-time	Real world
Domain of Heroes	Tandem Games	2008 (now closed)	MMORPG	Turn-based	Fantasy
Doomlord	Beholder Kft	2008	RPG	Real-time	Fantasy
Dragon City	Social Point	2013	Social networking	Real-time	Fantasy
Drakensang Online	Bigpoint	2011	MMORPG	Real-time	Fantasy
Earth Eternal	Sparkplay Media	2009 (now closed)	MMORPG	Real-time	Fantasy
Ember Sword	Bright Star Studios	2024 (now closed)	MMORPG	Real-time	Science Fiction
Empire & State	Novel, Inc.	2011	MMORPG	Real-time	Science Fiction
eRepublik	eRepublik Labs	2008	Strategy	Real-time	Contemporary/country building
Evony	Evony	2009	Strategy	Real-time	Fantasy/empire building
Fairy Tail: Hero's Journey	GameSamba	2018	role-playing	Turn-based	Anime/Fantasy
FarmVille	Zynga	2009	Simulation	Real-time	Farm building
Fallen London (formerly Echo Bazaar)	Failbetter Games	2009	RPG	Turn-based	Gothic Fantasy/Steampunk
Flirtboat	Sysis	2000 (now closed)	Social networking	Real-time	Real world
Forge of Empires	InnoGames	2012	Strategy	Real-time	Historical empire building
Forumwarz	Crotch Zombie Productions	2008	Strategy	Turn-based	Contemporary/Internet forum
Freeciv.net	The Freeciv Project	2010	Strategy	Turn-based	Empire building game
FusionFall	Cartoon Network/Grigon Entertainment	2009 (now closed)	MMORPG	Real-time	Science fiction
Granblue Fantasy	Cygames	2014 (Android, iOS), 2016 (PC)	MMORPG	Turn-based	Anime/Fantasy
Grendel's Cave	Grendel Enterprises, L.L.C.	1998	Adventure	Real-time	Literary (Beowulf)
Habbo Hotel	Sulake Inc.	2000	Social networking	Real-time	Contemporary/teenagers
Hattrick	ExtraLives	1997	Strategy	Real-time	Contemporary/soccer team
Ikariam	Gameforge	2007	Strategy	Real-time	Ancient Greece/empire building
Illyriad	Illyriad Games Ltd	2011	Strategy	Real-time	Fantasy/empire building
Kantai Collection	Kadokawa Games	2013	card battle game	Real-time	World War II
Kingdom of Loathing	Asymmetric Publications	2003	role-playing	Turn-based	Fantasy/humorous
Kung Fu Panda World	DreamWorks Animation	2010 (now closed)	MMORPG	Real-time	Fantasy
Legends of Zork	Jolt Online Gaming	2009-2011 (now closed)	role-playing	Turn-based	Fantasy/humorous
Little Space Heroes	Bubble Gum Interactive	2011 (now closed)	MMORPG	Real-time	Kids
Lord of Ultima	Electronic Arts	2010 (now closed)	Strategy	Real-time	Fantasy
Mad TV Online	Sven Burkert	2006	Strategy	Turn-based	Television business simulation/humorous
Man vs. Machine	MuchDifferent	2012 (now closed)	First-person shooter	Real-time	Unity
Might and Magic: Heroes Kingdoms	Ubisoft	2010 (now closed)	Strategy	Real-time	Fantasy/empire building
Might and Magic: Heroes Online	Ubisoft	2014 (now closed)	Strategy	Turn-based	Fantasy
Miniconomy	Trade Games International BV	2002	Strategy	Real-time	Contemporary/country building
Moshi Monsters	Mind Candy	2008 (now closed)	MMORPG	Real-time	Kids
MouseHunt	HitGrab, Inc	2008	Strategy, Social Networking	Real-time	Fantasy
NationStates	Max Barry	2002	Strategy	Real-time	Contemporary/country building
Neopets	World of Neopia, Inc.	1999	Strategy, Simulation	Real-time	Virtual Pet Site
Nile Online	Tilted Mill Entertainment	2008	Strategy	Real-time	Ancient Egypt/empire building
OGame	Gameforge AG	2002	Strategy	Real-time	Science fiction
Omerta	Omerta Game Limited	2003	MMORPG	Real-time	Mafia
Panfu	Goodbeans GmbH	2007 (now closed)	Virtual World	Real-time	Fantasy/teenagers
Pardus	Bayer&Szell OEG	2004	Strategy	Turn-based	Science fiction
Pirate Galaxy	Splitscreen Studios	2000	role-playing	Real-time	Science fiction
Planetarion	FUBRA	2000	Strategy	Turn-based	Science fiction
Quick Hit Football	Play Hard Sports	2009	Sports game	Real-time	Sports/American football
Realm of the Mad God	Wildshadow	2010	MMORPG	Real-time	Fantasy
Samurai Taisen	PST Team	2013	MMORTS, Visual Novel	Real-time	Sengoku period
Sentou Gakuen	PST Team	2012	MMORPG, Visual Novel	Real-time	School Life
Shakes & Fidget	Playa Games GmbH	2009	MMORPG	Real-time	Fantasy
Slither.io	Steve Howse	2016	Action	Real-time	Snakes on Black
SmallWorlds	Outsmart Games	2008 (now closed)	Virtual World, Social Networking	Real-time	Contemporary/teenagers
Squabble	Ottomated	2022	Battle royale, word game	Real-time	N/A
Star Wars Combine	SWC Team	1998	MMORPG	Real-time	Science fiction
Star Trek: Alien Domain	GameSamba	2015	Strategy	Real-time	Science fiction
Surviv.io	Kongregate	2017	Battle Royale	Real-time	Minimalist circles
TagPro	Nick Riggs (LuckySpammer)	2013	Multiplayer online battle arena	Real-time	Arena
Tanki Online	AlternativaPlatform	2009	3D MMO-Shooter	Real-time	Post-apocalyptic world
Terra Est Quaestuosa	Schoot Digital Productions	1998	Strategy	Turn-based	Contemporary/country building
Terra Militaris	SNAIL Game	2010	Strategy	Real-time	Historical/empire building
Torn	Torn LTD	2003	MMORPG	Real-time	Text based MMORPG
Trade Wars	Sylien Games	2007	Space trade and combat	Real-time	Fantasy
Transformice	Atelier 801	2010	Platform game	Real-time	MMOG
Travian	Travian Games	2004	MMORTS, Strategy	Real-time	Antiquity/empire building
Tribal Wars	InnoGames	2003	Strategy	Real-time	Empire building
Twilight Heroes	Quirkz Media	2007	role-playing	Turn-based	Contemporary/superheroes
Unforgiven War	Nvinium Games	2008	role-playing	Real-time	Modern Warfare
Urban Dead	Kevan Davis	2005 (now closed)	MMORPG	Turn-based	Contemporary/zombies
Urban Rivals	Boostr	2006	Collectible card game	Turn-based	Board game
Utopia	Omac Industries	1998	Strategy	Real-time	Fantasy
Virtonomics	Marilana UAB	2006	Business simulation	Turn-based	Real world
War of Legends	Ultizen	2010	Strategy	Real-time	Chinese fantasy
World of the Living Dead: Resurrection	Ballardia	2013 (now closed)	MMORPG	Real-Time	Zombie Survival Strategy
World War Online	Chilltime	2010	MMORTS	Real-time	Modern Warfare
X-Wars	Sebastian Lagemann, Nils Mitoussis, Mediatainment GmbH	2002 (now closed)	Strategy	Real-time	Science fiction

== See also ==
- Multiplayer video game
- MMORPG
- Browser based game
- List of massively multiplayer online games
- List of massively multiplayer online role-playing games
- List of free multiplayer online games
- List of free massively multiplayer online games
