= List of massively multiplayer online games =

This is a list of notable massively multiplayer online (MMO) games, sorted by category.

== Action ==
Game	Developer	Initial Release Date	Server Close Date	Ref.
Armored Warfare	MY.Games, Obsidian Entertainment	2015		
Cartoon Network Universe: FusionFall	Cartoon Network, Grigon Entertainment	January 13, 2009	August 29, 2013	
CrimeCraft	Vogster Entertainment	2009	August 31, 2017	
DC Universe Online	Dimensional Ink Games	January 11, 2011		
Infantry Online	Sony Online Entertainment	1999	March 2012	
SubSpace	Virgin Interactive	1997		
War Thunder	Gaijin Entertainment	December 21, 2016		
World of Tanks	Wargaming	August 12, 2010		
World of Warplanes	Wargaming	2013		
World of Warships	Wargaming	September 17, 2015		

== Browser games ==
- Agar.io
- Bin Weevils
- Blood Wars
- Castle of Heroes
- Club Penguin
- Command & Conquer: Tiberium Alliances
- Dark Orbit
- Empire & State
- Glitch
- Hattrick
- Ikariam
- Illyriad
- Imperia Online
- Little Space Heroes
- Lord of Ultima
- Miniconomy
- Moshi Monsters
- National Geographic Animal Jam
- NEO Shifters
- Ogame
- Omerta
- Pardus
- Pirate Galaxy
- Planetarion
- Poptropica
- Realm of the Mad God
- Runes of Magic
- Samurai Taisen
- Sentou Gakuen
- Slither.io
- Smallworlds
- Surviv.io
- Tenvi
- Terra Militaris
- TirNua
- Transformice
- Travian
- Tribal Wars
- Twin Skies
- Urban Dead
- World of the Living Dead: Resurrection

== Browser games with 3D rendering ==
- Battlestar Galactica Online
- Dark Orbit (Since 2015)
- Dead Frontier
- Family Guy Online
- Fragoria
- Free Realms
- RuneScape
- Tanki Online

== Building games ==
- Active Worlds
- Wurm Online

== Exploration ==
- Uru Live

== Puzzle ==
- Yohoho! Puzzle Pirates

== Social games ==
- Active Worlds
- Animal Jam Classic
- Bin Weevils
- EGO
- Flyff
- Free Realms
- Furcadia
- Habbo
- JumpStart
- Nicktropolis
- OurWorld
- Pirate101 (sister game to Wizard101)
- Red Light Center
- Second Life
- The Sims Online
- SmallWorlds
- Star Wars Combine
- Star Wars: The Old Republic
- Tanki Online
- There
- TirNua
- Toontown Online
- Transformice
- Virtual Magic Kingdom
- Virtual World of Kaneva
- vSide
- Wizard101 (sister game to Pirate101)
- Woozworld

== Space simulation ==
- Dual Universe
- Elite Dangerous
- Eve Online

== See also ==
- List of free massively multiplayer online games
- List of free multiplayer online games
- Multiplayer video game
- Massively multiplayer online role-playing game (MMORPG)
- Browser based game
- Chronology of MUDs
