= TEQ =

TEQ is an acronym for:

- TEQ (TV channel), full name Télévision Ethnique du Québec, now CJNT-DT
- Time domain equalizer, in Orthogonal frequency-division multiplexing.
- Tax equalization
- Terra Est Quaestuosa, an online, text-based real-time strategy game
- Toxic equivalent (dioxin) for dioxins
- Tradable Energy Quotas
- Tekirdağ Çorlu Airport

it may also refer to

- teq, the international code for the Temein language in ISO 639-3
