= Outsmart =

Outsmart may refer to:

- OutSmart, an LGBT magazine
- "Outsmart", an album by Neil Cicierega
- Outsmart Games, publisher of SmallWorlds
