= Nurdle =

Nurdle or Nerdle may refer to:

- Nurdle (bead), a pre-production microplastic pellet about the size of a pea
- Plastic resin pellet pollution, nurdles as marine debris
- Nurdle, a term used in cricket; see List of cricket terms
- Nerdle, a numbers-based Wordle-type game
- Nurdle (toothpaste), a marketing design used by toothpaste companies

== See also ==
- Noodle (disambiguation)
