= Blood Wars =

Blood Wars can refer to:

- Underworld: Blood Wars
- Blood Wars (card game)
- Blood Wars (video game)

== See also ==
- Blood War
