= Hoshi Saga =

- Genres: Puzzle game, point-and-click
- Developer: Nekogames
- Publisher: Nekogames
- Creator: Yoshio Ishii (Nekogames)
- Platforms: Web Browser; Adobe Flash
- First release: 2007

Hoshi Saga is a series of point-and-click Flash puzzle games created by the Japanese video game designer Yoshio Ishii, known as Nekogames. The games focus on the objective of finding a five-pointed star in each level, with each game containing multiple challenges of varying difficulties. They have been noted by various outlets for their unique level design and diverse challenges.

== Gameplay ==
Labeled as point-and-click puzzle games, the Hoshi Saga series involve searching for the star hidden in each stage. Each game consists of a series of levels with vague clues and indications that challenge players to locate the star. The levels range in difficulty as indicated with a star difficulty system, with half a star being the easiest and five stars representing the most difficult. Some levels contain easily obtainable stars that range from seconds to minutes to discover, while other levels may take longer and leave players in confusion. The game's interactivity requires players to use various mouse actions in order to solve several of the puzzles, with some levels resembling "arcade-like mini games" and others requiring players to create a star from the level's pieces. The levels have also been described as akin to vignettes, representing brief concepts and ideas.

== Background ==
The Hoshi Saga games were created by Yoshio Ishii, a Japanese game designer who had published the game under the studio and website name "Nekogames." Ishii had designed games such as Cursor*10 and the Neko series among other games. Despite his work, Ishii's identity remains mostly unknown, with John Walker of Rock Paper Shotgun describing him as an enigma. The first game in the series was released in 2007. Various games were released in the series, including Hoshi Saga 2 and 3, Hoshi Saga Ringo and Hoshi Saga Ringoame. By 2015 there were 12 games in the series, all of which were released for free. The games were created in Adobe Flash.

== Reception ==
Walker reviewed various games in the series throughout 2007 and 2015, praising them for their creativity and rewarding gameplay. He ranked the original game as one of the 25 best puzzle games ever made in a 2015 Rock Paper Shotgun article, stating that the games should serve as inspirations for puzzle designers to create their own interesting puzzle ideas. Winda Benedetti of Seattle Post-Intelligencer described the games as "devilish" while noting that players will "start to get the hang of it" through sustained play of the levels. James Renovitch of The Austin Chronicle described the task of finding the stars as alternating between easy and hard difficulty, and stated that the levels share "clean design and playful interaction". In a 2010 column from Italian gaming site Multiplayer.it, Simone Tagliaferri and Andrea Rubbini compared Hoshi Saga Ringo to the freeware game ClickPLAY 2. Although observing that the games had similar concepts, the journalists noted Hoshi Saga Ringo's uniqueness along with its minimalism and tranquil nature. Hoshi Saga Ringo was later listed in game journalist Michael Rose's 2011 book 250 Indie Games You Must Play.
