= Unforgiven War =

2008 video game

- Developer: Nvinium Game Inc. LLC
- Designer: Nvinium Game Inc. LLC
- Release: March 2008
- Genre: Massive Multiplayer Online Role Playing Game
- Mode: Multiplayer

Unforgiven War is a free text/browser-based massively multiplayer online role-playing game developed by Nvinium Games. The game is set in current times, where the world is engulfed in conflict and peace is hanging by a thread. Players enter the game as a new recruit into boot camp, where they train their characters by doing missions and learning new and different military positions and jobs. Players can play alone or join a platoon.

== Gameplay ==
Gameplay involves players training up their character to be the ultimate weapon. They can do this by doing missions, or raising their stats in the gym. The amount of missions they can do depends on their "Brave" points, which goes up as their character levels up. As they work their way up the ranks, they can choose to play by themselves or find and join a platoon, or lead it themselves. There are various player versus player aspects in the game, with features such as trooper vs. trooper or platoon vs. platoon battles. The gameplay is not totally combat oriented, aside from missions, players can do mini-games such as gambling or racing.

If a player fails a mission or fails in attacking other players, they end up in Jail or the Hospital areas. While in Jail, a player has to wait for a certain time to serve as penalty, but other players can bail them out or they can bribe their way out. If their character is fatally injured, they end up in the hospital, where they need to recover for 25 minutes.

As the player levels up, their HP, Brave, Energy and Will increases. Brave is used for missions, Energy for attacking other players, and Will is for increasing stats. Stats include Strength, Agility, Guard and Labour which affect their character's attack, defense and mission success. There is also a Training Center feature, where they can have their characters learn specialties which range from increasing ranks to job requirements. Once a character has a job, they get stat increases as well as salary.

There are two types of currency in the game, cash/dollars and points. Players earn cash through missions or by defeating other players, which they can use to purchase equipment such as weapons and armor or properties such as houses. Points can be earned mostly by donating, or can be sold and bought by players with in-game cash. Donators get a 'Respected Trooper' title, and are provided with incentives such as unique items, increased stats, reduced Hospital recovery time and points.

Other features include a pet system, an airport for changing locations, a bank for storing cash, an in-engine mailing system, a shoutbox for communicating with other players realtime and community forums.

== Business model ==
UnforgivenWar is free-to-play, and is based on an "Item Shop" model where users can exchange real-world money for in-game currency (in this case, points and in-game dollars), which is then used to buy virtual items from the item shop. These include special items such as weapons and armor and the ability to "re-spec" (change aspects of the player's character) plus the traditional "advertising" model.

== Popularity ==
Within the first 6 months of launch, the game had grown to over 30,000 members. To date, the game has over 164,000 registered characters with over 60,000 active. After a few years(current date is April 2012)the game has become less popular with at most, 3 players actively playing every hour. The game is also playable on popular social-networking sites Facebook and MySpace.

== See also ==
- List of multiplayer browser games
