= The Impossible Quiz =

2007 video game

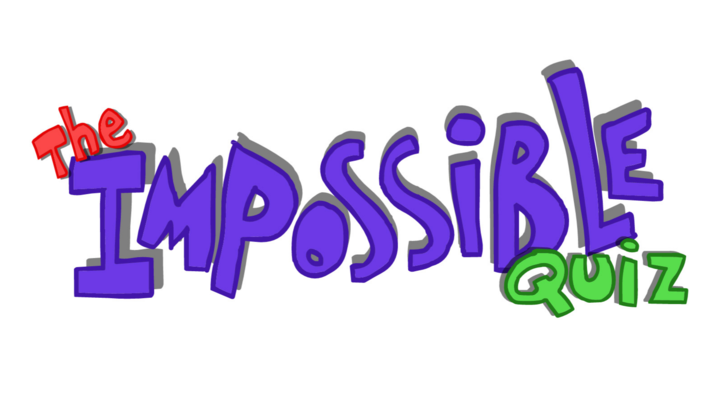
- Developer: Splapp-me-do
- Publishers: Splapp-me-do; inXile Entertainment (mobile)
- Engine: Adobe Flash
- Platforms: Browser, Android, iOS
- Release: Flash; February 20, 2007; Android, iOS; 2010
- Genres: Quiz game, point-and-click
- Mode: Single-player

The Impossible Quiz is a 2007 point-and-click quiz video game created by a British video game developer and DeviantArt user known as Splapp-me-do. Noted for its difficulty, the game consists of various trick questions among irreverent humor and references to popular culture. Considered to be an influential title during the heyday of Flash content, The Impossible Quiz received positive reviews from critics for its difficulty, creativity of the questions and encouragement of outside-the-box thinking. The game was also released on iOS and Android in 2011, and spawned various sequels.

== Gameplay ==
The first of 110 questions in The Impossible Quiz

The Impossible Quiz is a point-and-click quiz game that consists of 110 questions, using "Gonna Fly Now" as its main musical theme. Notorious for its difficulty, the quiz mixes multiple-choice trick questions similar to riddles, along with various challenges and puzzles. Despite the quiz's name and arduousness, the game is possible to beat. Many of the questions are abstract and unconventional in nature, and have been noted as requiring players to think outside the box. Considered a memory game, the quiz emphasizes trial-and-error gameplay.

Players receive three lives to answer all the questions. Answering a question wrong results in the game producing a bomb sound to indicate the player losing a life, and having to pick another answer before proceeding to the next question. The game ends when players lose all three lives. However, some questions have a bomb with a time limit ranging from one to ten seconds; if the player fails to answer the question before the allotted time, the game instantly ends. The game offers players seven "Skip" buttons over the course of the game that grant the ability to bypass most questions, although these skips are useless due to having to use them all in the last question. In the mobile versions, a feature called a "Moron Mark" appears every 20 questions which allows players to reset from a particular question if all lives are lost. The quiz was also noted for its irreverent humor. Some questions contained references to video games and popular culture, while other questions consisted of scatological humor.

== Development ==
DeviantArt user Splapp-me-do lives in Hull, United Kingdom. He released the game on the website in 2007, and it later appeared on Flash game websites such as Newgrounds and Not Doppler, along with being released on its own website. On Tumblr, he stated that he originally made the game as a demo in college for a website his friends developed, but later went back to develop it on his own time. The influences for the game were the quiz portion of the level "The Villi People" in Earthworm Jim 2 and the quiz show Shooting Stars. In 2011, publisher inXile Entertainment released the game on iOS and Android devices. The game also led to several sequels, such as The Impossible Quiz 2, The Impossible Quiz Book and The Impossible Quizmas.

== Reception and impact ==
The Impossible Quiz received positive reviews from critics, with several outlets praising the game's difficulty and the creativity of the questions. In a 2022 retrospective of The Impossible Quiz, Polygon writer Harri Chan described the game as "intentionally antagonistic to the player", but "satisfying", and compared the quiz to other games with hard difficulty such as Getting Over It with Bennett Foddy and Unfair Mario. Chan also reflected on how the game's popularity within schools invoked collaboration amongst classmates, despite the game's single-player focus. Jenny Williams of Wired noted that the game's focus on memorization and logic encouraged players to continuously fail and retry. She also claimed that finding the answers would make players both laugh and feel clever, also recommending the quiz "to thinking adults and very clever children everywhere". Another Wired article claimed that although the quiz is possible to beat, it may be impossible to complete without the player losing their sanity. Engadget writer Ludwig Kietzmann echoed a similar sentiment, and also described the game's difficulty as akin to "having moist strands of spaghetti run through your fingers. You just can't get a grip". Kat Brewster of Rock Paper Shotgun regarded the game as emblematic of 2000s internet humor, along with praising the game's focus on the meaning of difficulty and failure. Conversely, Lex Friedman of Macworld criticized the mobile version while comparing it unfavorably to The Moron Test, claiming it lacks the charm of the latter game.

Since its release, The Impossible Quiz has been recognized by several outlets as an influential game in the heyday of Flash's popularity. CBR listed the quiz as one of the most nostalgic Flash games, noting that the game's "goofy imagery and the talk it generated on the playground remain etched in memory". Alternative Press also added the game to a similar list in 2020. Game journalist Rachel Watts noted the game as building a sense of camaraderie amongst classmates in a PC Gamer article about games played on school computers. John Daskalopoulos, founder of the Flash game website Not Doppler, praised the game for its creativity in a 2008 TechRadar article. Gaming website Poki noted that the game was one of the titles that inspired the company to focus on Flash game preservation.

== See also ==
- Lateral thinking
- List of browser games
