= Panfu =

2007 video game

Panfu - Be a Panda!
- Developer: Goodbeans GmbH
- Type: Massively multiplayer online game
- Launched: Germany December 2007; United Kingdom February 2008; France February 2008; Spain February 2008; Netherlands February 2008; Poland April 2008; Sweden July 2008; Norway July 2008; Finland July 2008; Denmark July 2008; Russia December 2008; Brazil July 2010; United Arab Emirates August 2010
- Discontinued: November 1, 2016
- Platform: Online (Adobe Flash)
- Status: Closed (November 1, 2016)
- Website: Panfu Website at the Wayback Machine (archived October 29, 2016)

Panfu was a massively multiplayer online game for children aged between 6 and 14, involving a virtual world where players could create their own panda and explore the island of Panfu. Players were able to complete quests, play mini-games and chat with other player pandas. According to the creators, about 15,000 players registered daily on the German Panfu. Panfu was made available to the general public on December 1, 2007 – after a beta testing-phase which lasted a month.

The servers were taken offline in November 2016 after Goodbeans GmbH filed for bankruptcy in 2015.

== History ==
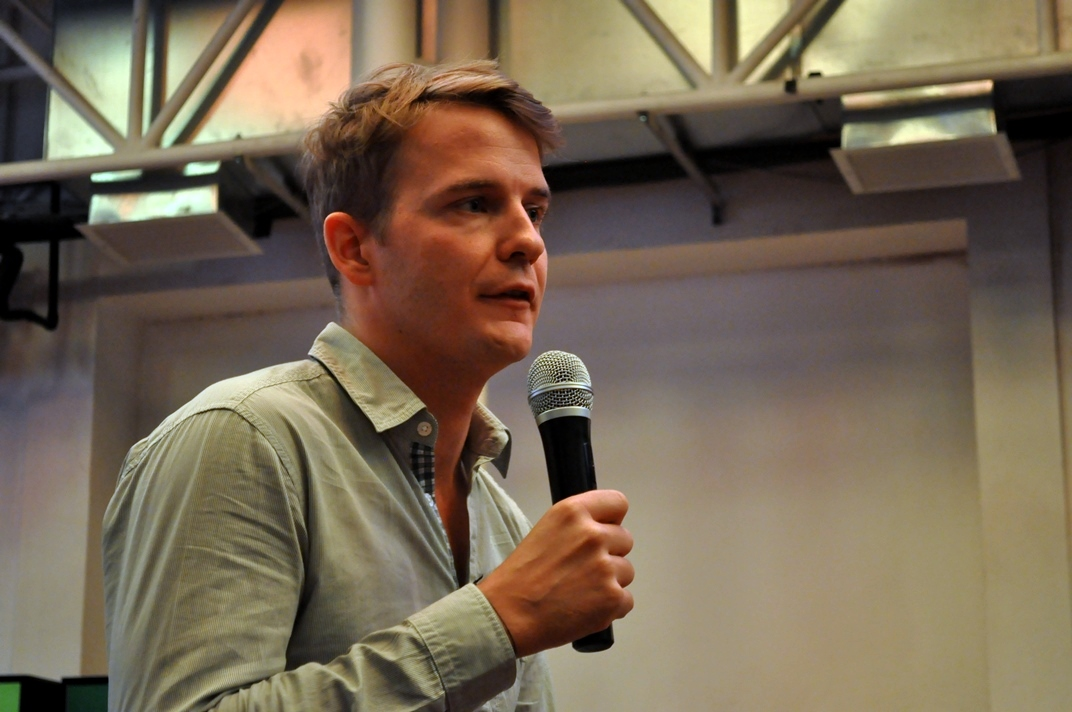
Panfu co-founder Kay Kühne.

The two founders of Young Internet, Kay Kühne and Moritz Hohl, first published Panfu in December 2007, after 3 months of development and a month of public beta testing. Panfu is a name composed of the words "panda" and the Chinese word for happiness, fú (福). Only 6 weeks after its launch, Panfu had more than 300,000 registered members. Following this, Panfu hit one million users in April 2008, and in June 2009, the website had 10 million users worldwide and stood as one of the biggest children's virtual world in Europe.

Panfu screenshot

The number of users eventually grew to over 15 million, and the game was translated into 12 different languages. In April 2012, Young Internet was renamed to Goodbeans and shifted their focus to mobile gaming. With the new focus on mobile-only, their focus slowly drifted away from Panfu. The last team-members were laid off in December 2014, and in February 2015 there were only two employees left. In January 2015 Goodbeans filed for bankruptcy, after Panfu had not been updated since December 2014. Instead of shutting Panfu down completely, the team decided to let the game remain open until the domain expired, and thus never properly announced that they were closing. Panfu finally closed in November 2016.

== Security in Panfu ==
According to the creators, security was the biggest priority in Panfu. The chat was closed from 3 AM to 8 AM on weekdays, and from 8 PM to 11 AM on weekends. A word filter prevented verbal attacks and warned players when they didn't follow the rules. The chat was also under strict observation by moderators, who acted as safeguarders for players on the site. Parents could also opt-in to allow their child to only see the high security-chat. It allowed the child to select chat messages from a menu of premade greetings, questions, phrases, feelings, and options for action.

In July 2009, the first Panda sheriffs were introduced to help the moderators keep Panfu safe. They could mute other players for 30 minutes or freeze them, so they could not do anything for a minute. This worked only a few times, after which the sheriffs had to bring another sheriff or a moderator to help. Players could tell which pandas were sheriffs by the star-badge they had on their profiles.

== Membership ==
Some features in Panfu required players to purchase a membership known as "Gold Panda" in order to be used. "Gold Panda" gave players the opportunity to decorate their treehouse, purchase clothes, adopt a pet and visit the "Underwater School". In 2013, a lifetime Gold Panda-offer was made, which was originally intended to be limited only to the spring of that year, but instead ended up remaining until the game was closed.
