= Twilight Heroes =

2007 video game

- "Justice Served Nightly"
- Developer(s): Quirkz Media
- Publisher(s): Quirkz Media
- Designer(s): Ross "Ryme" Patty
- Platform(s): Web browser
- Release: October 31, 2007
- Genre(s): Turn based RPG
- Mode(s): Single-player, multiplayer

Twilight Heroes is a browser-based, multiplayer role playing game designed and operated and released by American studio Quirkz Media in October 2007. In 2011, operation (and possibly some elements of design) were subsequently taken over by Metroplexity Games.

Players take on the role of superheroes as they fight monsters and villains in turn-based combat, collect items and chips (the game's currency), and complete quests. The game's setting features surreal humor, parody, references to popular culture, and word play, most notably spoonerisms and anagrams. Twilight Heroes is free-to-play, but offers incentives for donations.

== Gameplay ==
Gameplay in Twilight Heroes has been described as "...sort of like a Choose Your Own Adventure story, but much more interactive." The player chooses an area of the city to "patrol". Patrolling may have two outcomes: either combat will be initiated or a small story will be displayed. Patrolling consumes game turns, and once all turns are used up the player character's bedtime has arrived, and they must rest to prepare for their day job. Players may increase their number of turns per day by consuming caffeine-based items such as coffee or tea, but only by a limited amount per day. The game day resets and players are granted more turns at rollover, an event which occurs daily at 11:10 P.M. Eastern Standard Time (GMT -5).

Screenshot of combat against a green twosome

Initially, the player may only visit Somerset Square and their Hideout. Somerset Square is the suburb in which the player lives, and contains stores and low-level areas for patrolling. The Hideout is the area where the player can rest to regain Hit Points and Power Points. Here, the player can also assemble or weld items, access their computer (if available), manage character specialty-only items and switch types of transportation in the garage.

Players can undertake quests, fight bosses, and advance the in-game story. As the player increases in level and gains new modes of transportation, more areas become available to patrol. For example, a player with a bicycle can access more areas of the city than one who is on foot, while a player with a jetpack has even greater range and can even patrol in the sky.

The game shares many similarities with Kingdom of Loathing, such as the focus on humor and word play. Both games use turn-based systems which grant players a limited number of actions per day. The game's creator, "Ryme", consulted Kingdom of Loathing creator Jick's advice in multiple areas of game design and coding.

== Plot ==
The game takes place in the fictional Twilight City, which resembles an average American city, albeit one in which superpowers, renegade robots and monsters are commonplace. The city's currency is the casino chip. The player begins the game as middle-waged, apathetic, average citizen in a city plagued by crime. After the player character's apartment is ransacked, he or she decides to fight back against the criminals. The player encounters a suspicious figure on the street, but is quickly knocked unconscious. Upon waking up, the player character discovers a talisman, an object which grants the character superpowers. The qualities of the talisman vary according to the character class the player selected, with the four available classes being: Elemental, Gadgeteer, Naturalist, and Psion.

== Reception ==
Twilight Heroes is one of ten games listed as the best freeware role-playing and Roguelike games of 2007 by IndieGames.com. Video game journalist John Walker described the game as "a surprisingly in-depth and complex RPG". Despite finding combat becoming repetitive very quickly, he stated the game's writing makes it "a lot of fun". In particular he highlighted the in-game dictionary, which offers off-the-wall descriptions of items which are unambiguous in the first place. Eurogamer's Jon Hamblin rated Twilight Heroes 6/10, citing the lack of opportunities for players to customize their characters and the lack of activities for players with more experienced and powerful characters, but noted that new quests were regularly being added. Hamblin stated that the largest problem he found was the inconsistent tone; "...the mildly tongue-in-cheek descriptions here are occasionally too serious, and neither specific enough for parody, nor funny enough to take flight on their own."
