= Neurocracy =

- Logo of Omnipedia
- Developer: Playthroughline
- Designer: Matei Stanca
- Artist: Alice Duke
- Writer: Joannes Truyens
- Platform: Web browser
- Release: First episode; 14 July 2021; Final episode; 16 September 2021
- Genres: Hypertext fiction; Epistolary novel; Alternate reality game
- Mode: Single-player

Neurocracy is a browser-based video game developed by Joannes Truyens, Matei Stanca and Younès Rabii under the label Playthroughline, released in ten weekly episodes from July to September 2021. Players explore Omnipedia, a fictional Wikipedia successor launched in 2049, and uncover information about the assassination of its major investor, Xu Shaoyong, by perusing its articles, hyperlinks and revision histories. It has been described as "wiki-based metafiction".

== Gameplay ==
Neurocracy has variously been described as an alternate reality game and hypertext fiction. Navigating through their own web browsers, players peruse Omnipedia, a fictional online encyclopedia heavily modelled on Wikipedia, to solve the assassination of its major investor, Xu Shaoyong.

Omnipedia's articles mimic Wikipedia's distinctive formatting and dispassionate tone, complete with images, infoboxes and citations. Omnipedia's home page states that Omnipedia was made as a successor to Wikipedia, which was shut down in 2048 in the game's universe. Players can also view these articles' revision histories – allowing them to discover when and how articles' text was expanded, deleted or changed. These histories were updated as new episodes were released. Players can explore Omnipedia through its function to display random articles or by following its extensive hyperlinks. To compensate for its writers' inability to create a full-length page for every hyperlink, while maintaining the impression of a comprehensive, interlinked encyclopedia, most articles' content is limited to a brief preview. Players view these previews by hovering their mouse over a hyperlink, mimicking Wikipedia's ability to display article previews.

Neurocracy lacks any user interface other than Omnipedia's own and does not log players' progress in solving its mysteries. Reviewers have suggested players instead record their deductions in a separate document or join Neurocracy's community Discord server to share speculations with other players. Over the course of Neurocracy's episodic release, Truyens planned to modify its narrative in response to player-created theories, although its ultimate ending would be unchanged.

== Synopsis ==
The game is set in 2049 where AI technology has advanced considerably; China has supplanted the United States as the global superpower; and the world is still recovering from a pandemic of Cariappa-Muren disease, a tuna-borne prion illness. On 1 October 2049, the first in-game "day", Chinese technology billionaire Xu Shaoyong is assassinated in Beijing when his helicopter is shot down by a hacked security drone.

== Development ==
Neurocracy was developed by Joannes Truyens and Matei Stanca, who met in the Half-Life modding scene. In 2019, they raised £12,095 via a Kickstarter campaign, which was sufficient to commission Alice Duke, a concept artist, to produce the game's illustrations. Several guest writers – Leigh Alexander, Malka Older, Axel Hassen Taiari, Yudhanjaya Wijeratne, Holly Nielsen and Younès Rabii – contributed articles for Omnipedia. Although Truyens briefed the writers on Neurocracy's overarching plotlines, they were otherwise permitted creative freedom.

Stanca was responsible for Omnipedia's technical development. To create Omnipedia, they initially planned to employ MediaWiki, the underlying software of Wikipedia itself – however, it was outside their technical experience. Since Omnipedia's software was not required to fully maintain a wiki, merely to simulate its appearance, Stanca instead used Drupal.

Truyens has cited the influence of Deus Ex on the worldbuilding of Neurocracy, telling PC Gamer "I soaked up all the attention to detail in its depiction of a grounded near-future...which made me want to create such a world of my own". The open-ended nature of games such as 80 Days and Heaven's Vault inspired the choice to allow players to approach the story from any angle or starting point.

== Reception ==
Critical reception of the game was generally positive. Critics noted the novelty of the game's format, which uses ergodic text extensively. Sarah Maria Griffin, writing in The Guardian, praised the game's realistic worldbuilding: "There is a sense in each entry that what we see there could be just around the corner. This is what excellent science fiction does: it holds up a mirror to culture as it is, and shows us what is just creeping up behind us". Oscar Westerholm, writing for Sydsvenskan, agreed, especially with regard to the game's depiction of disinformation, and noted that Omnipedia's dynamic nature reflects that of information on the Internet and a changing global society.
