= Nyrthos =

- Developer: BeerDeer Games
- Platforms: Windows, macOS, Android, iOS
- Genre: Action role-playing

Nyrthos is an action RPG developed by BeerDeer Games, a Czech independent game development studio. The target platforms are Windows, MacOS, Android and iOS.

== Gameplay ==
The game takes place in a fictional world, "Nyrthos", a continent surrounded by sea. The storyline details have not been extensively revealed by the developers.

Nyrthos is influenced by the Diablo and Gothic series. The game's core mechanics will be similar to other RPGs (e.g. killing monsters, leveling, learning new skills, looting). However, Nyrthos will also incorporates elements from other genres, allowing players to build structures and manage resources, similar to a simulation video game.

The game takes place in an expanding world, in which players can influence the development of the story with their votes and actions. Nyrthos also features a day/night/weather cycle that strongly impacts the world. The night is dark and more dangerous, so many actions have to be performed during the day. The cycle influences many things, such as enemies, spawnable items, and events.

== BeerDeer Games ==
BeerDeer Games is a small indie games development studio located in Prague, Czech Republic. It was founded in 2011 by Martin Pivko and Martin Jelínek, who had previously worked together on several projects in the area of flash, game, application, and web development. Nyrthos is their first original project and was supposed to come out for PC, Android and iOS in 2012, but did not make the deadline.

== Technology and Platforms ==
The game is being developed using Stage3D and Starling and may be available both as a browser-based (using the flash plug-in) and as an installed version. The target platforms are both browsers (PC, MAC) and mobiles (Android, iOS).

The use of Stage 3D/Flash allows to utilize devices' graphics cards, even while running in the flash plug-in, in order to lower the performance load of the processor.
