= Swords and Sandals =

Video game

Swords and Sandals is a series of turn-based fighting, action platformer, and real-time strategy video games, made for Flash, Windows, iOS and Android. They were released between 2005 and 2022 by the Australian company Whiskeybarrel Studios.

== List of games ==
=== Swords and Sandals 1: Gladiator ===
Swords and Sandals I: Gladiator, uploaded to Newgrounds on September 25, 2006,is the first title in the series. The main character is a pirate, shipwrecked on Doomtrek Island and forced into gladiatorism to survive. In character creation, the player can choose what the main character looks like and how his skills are distributed. Each skill relates to a form of combat: the higher the level, the better he performs at it.

In every match, the player controls the gladiator through icons around him in a turn-based combat system, usually against one opponent. After winning, the gladiator earns gold, which can be spent at the Armory for armor, spent at the Smithy for weapons, or saved for later. New armor and weapons are unlocked by leveling up. Saving the game at any point is restricted to the full version of the game.

=== Swords and Sandals II: Emperor's Reign ===
Swords and Sandals II: Emperor's Reign, released on January 7, 2007, is the second title in the series, being the sequel of Gladiator. As with the previous game, it is based on gladiatorial combat. The player takes part in duels and tournaments with the goal of becoming the champion of the arena.

The player begins as a weak prisoner who is freed after winning a fight against a harmless enemy, and must progress through the arena in order to defeat Emperor Antares. Compared to the previous game, the character can equip a second weapon, usually a ranged weapon. During combat, the gladiator can switch between a hand-held weapon and a ranged weapon, although ranged weapons have limited ammunition. Once the ammunition is spent, the player must finish the fight using a hand-held weapon.

The game also introduces magic spells and potions. Weapons, potions, and magic spells are unlocked when the character has the required number of skill points, while armor continues to be unlocked by leveling up.

=== Swords and Sandals Crusader ===
Swords and Sandals Crusader was released on August 2, 2007. Unlike the main arena-focused entries, Crusader expands the series into strategy-based gameplay, with players commanding armies and taking part in larger battles across the world of Brandor.

=== Swords and Sandals III: Gladiae Ultratus ===
Swords and Sandals III: Gladiae Ultratus, originally uploaded to Newgrounds as Swords & Sandals III: Solo Ultratus on September 29, 2008, is the third main installment in the series and places the player in the Gladiae Ultratus, a major gladiatorial tournament in Tritonia. The game expands the arena combat of the earlier titles with improved visuals, more playable character types, new spells, special abilities, magical items, and 24 Arena Champions. Gladiae Ultratus is the solo edition of the game, focused on single-player battles against computer-controlled gladiators and arena champions, in contrast to the later multiplayer edition, Swords & Sandals III: Multiplae Ultratus.

=== Sword and Sandals IV: Tavern Quests ===
Swords and Sandals IV: Tavern Quests was released on May 17, 2009. In this fourth installment, players explore beyond the arena in a more adventure-focused RPG setting. Tavern Quests allows players to travel through a world filled with quests, shops, and mini-games, combining elements of the series' combat system with new adventure-based gameplay.

=== Swords and Sandals V: Grail of Antares ===
Swords and Sandals V: Grail of Antares, released on November 22, 2011, continues the series' fantasy setting and expands on its role-playing elements, following the player's journey through the world of Brandor in search of the Grail of Antares.

=== Swords and Sandals 2 Redux ===
Swords and Sandals 2 Redux, released on June 29, 2017, is an updated version of Swords and Sandals II: Emperor's Reign.

=== Swords and Sandals Medieval ===
Swords and Sandals Medieval, released on September 14, 2017, shifts the series into a medieval setting.

=== Swords and Sandals 5 Redux: Maximus Edition ===
Swords and Sandals 5 Redux, released on January 9, 2018, is an updated version of Swords and Sandals V: Grail of Antares.

=== Swords and Sandals Pirates ===
Swords and Sandals Pirates was released on November 30, 2018.

=== Swords and Sandals: Immortals ===
Swords and Sandals: Immortals was released in early access on Steam on May 26, 2022, before receiving its full PC release on March 9, 2023. The iOS version was released on September 20, 2023. It is the most recent main game in the series and the first installment to be made using the Godot Engine.

The game is presented as Swords and Sandals VI and features a large single-player campaign in which the player journeys across the continent in search of fabled Arena Champions to defeat. Locations include the scorching T'Kash Desert, the abyssal caverns of the Forbidden Depths, and the great palaces of Phaetor itself.
