= Domain of Heroes =

Domain of Heroes was a free-to-play, text-based MMORPG by American studio Tandem Games. It was a browser based game, designed so that it can be played whilst running other games, or working. It is free to play, supported by an optional micropayment business model.

== Gameplay ==
Domain of Heroes used text and some artwork to describe the game environment.

There were 3 Factions, 27 Classes, and 30 Races in Domain of Heroes, the full list of which is within "The Great Codex" in the game. Once a player chose one of each of these they then explore the Domain of Heroes world and its locales. Players were able to battle monsters or other players, complete quests, level up, collect items, trade/sell items, forge items, or simply participate in guilds and the community.

Each player started the game with one "wish". They were able to acquire more wishes by collecting loot and coin during battle and then trading with players. Micro transactions are also available. Players were able to utilize wishes to increase the storage capacity of their mule, personalize their character, acquire better gear, and many more.

Domain of Heroes was designed to run in the background if necessary. The tab in their taskbar kept them current on their character's status so they didn't need to reopen the game window repeatedly.

== Development ==
Domain of Heroes was created by Tandem Games in 2008. It was released for beta testing in May 2008 and open to the public in October of the same year. The game was in a constant state of advancement. It received regular updates including content, technical revisions, and artwork. Players were encouraged to share their ideas for game improvement and were often the impetus for changes and additions to the game. Tandem Games partnered with Intel in their Software Partner Program during the creation of Domain of Heroes. Domain of Heroes and its parent studio, Tandem Games, also used the game to donate to charity. Every time players made an in game purchase, 5% of the purchase went to charity.

In October 2017 the owners announced that the game would either be sold or shut down. On November 2, 2017, Tandem Games declared they were shutting down the game.
