= World of the Living Dead =

2014 video game

World of the Living Dead: Resurrection
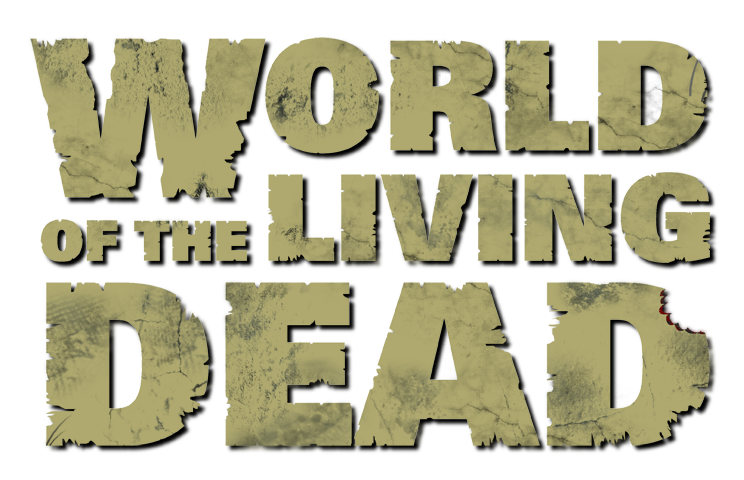
- Challenging and Cerebral
- Developer: Ballardia
- Designers: Dave Barton, Kulpreet Singh
- Series: World of the Living Dead (Now Closed)
- Engine: OpenStreetMap
- Platform: Web browser iPhone iPad Android Tablet Mac Linux Ubuntu
- Release: 21 February 2014 -23 June 2014
- Genres: Survival horror, MMORPG, Browser Game, Strategy Game, Role Playing Game
- Mode: Multiplayer

World of the Living Dead (WoTLD) : Resurrection was a real-time zombie survival strategy browser game developed using OpenStreetMap to provide the underlying game world, with in-depth gameplay features to make a browser-based massively multiplayer online role-playing game accessible on desktop, tablet and mobile devices.

The game was set in a post-apocalyptic Los Angeles, over-run by the zombie apocalypse. Players were tasked with commanding, sustaining, and protecting one or more squads of survivors as they roamed the deserted streets and fought for survival. Players assumed the role of an operative taking a satellite view of the situation, and radioing in orders akin to classic early 1990s of the National Emergency Control and Relief Agency (NECRA), a government agency tasked with rebuilding civilization. Players couldn't control the survivors individually, but instead used squad-level controls to accomplish objectives. The game had player vs. player PvP, Faction gameplay and player vs. environment PvE elements.

WoTLD: Resurrection ran its first round of Closed Beta Testing in October 2013. The second test began in December 2013, with the game being released to the public on 21 February 2014.

WoTLD: Resurrection announced its permanent shutdown on 23 June 2014.

In 2016, the heading of the official website changed to 'World of the Living Dead book coming in 2016' along with the website name to 'World of the Living Dead - Do you love reading about zombies?'.

== Gameplay ==
The interface of WoTLD made use of OpenStreetMap and was set in a post-Apocalyptic Los Angeles . Much of the gameplay consisted of moving around the game world, a grid made up of 500m x 500m squares with occasional skirmishes with the zombies and the injuries that occur from such battles. In each zone, players had options to engage "zeds" scavenge for items, engage opponents, collect research samples or construct safehouses.

There were several thousand locations on the map, once a player had moved his/her team onto these locations several actions became available. These actions ranged from scavenging the zone for resources to tagging the walls to mark your passing. Squads were marked with small icons on the map, and opposing players, as well as notable buildings are scattered around the map. Movement consisted of moving through the game world step by step. Combat was not "seen" first-hand, instead popping up as a series of combat reports, detailing any injuries, kills and/or deaths. As your characters progress, fear, and fatigue start to take its toll, making your survivors less efficient.

With a complex system of needs, food and water became critical resources in the game and players had to manage hunger and thirst. After passing a certain number of days at maximum thirst or hunger, survivors would go AWOL, moving to a random location on the map, from which they needed to be recovered by the player. Hunger and dehydration would also hinder the survivor's performance, slowing them down in combat, making them an easier target. Thus, every expedition had to be carefully planned before ordering your people to leave the relative safety of your safehouse. Players who returned between gameplay sessions to their safehouse would see their health recover, and fear and fatigue drop, and these could be sped up through development of the appropriate skills.

Instead of defining hordes as specific beings, or even as a number, WoTLD used a unique definition of "z-density", defining the density of zombies within a block instead of the actual zombie count. Level of density is defined by a scale of colors, providing a better visual at a first glance.

== Development ==
World of the Living Dead: Resurrection was developed by Irish indie games developer Ballardia, which consisted of Dave Barton and Kulpreet Singh. Dave and Kulpreet were both senior development staff at pre-GameStop Jolt Online, then known as OMAC Industries, founded by Dylan Collins, a successful Irish games and technology entrepreneur. He had previously sold Demonware, to Activision, and secured a license to develop a game base on the Zork series. Dave Barton was Lead Designer for Legends of Zork, and Kulpreet was CTO, and Lead Developer on NationStates 2.

WoTLD was originally conceived by Dave Barton in 2007. Development began in mid-2009 with the help of Kulpreet Singh. Open beta was originally planned for December 2010, and featured a game engine that incorporated Google Maps. It went into Closed Beta in late 2010, and Open Beta in 2012. However, the developers encountered a severe problem as the Google Maps API, which the game was built around, could not handle large numbers of concurrent players. This meant that the game, which was built around moving through the game's landscape, reacting in real time to noise and other players, did not scale well. Development of all the gameplay elements continued, and the game continued to receive updates until May 2013 when it was announced to be shutting down the following month, allowing the developers to bring the game forward on the new OpenStreetMap system. In June 2014, servers closed, allowing the developers to refocus all efforts to rerelease the game as World of the Living Dead: Resurrection.

In early 2013 the developers chose OpenStreetMap as a replacement. The first phase of Closed Beta Testing began on 10 October 2013 with over 300 testers, which ended in late November 2013 after initial bug fixes were rapidly deployed, and rebalancing of all metrics tweaked regularly. This shut down in November 2013, allowing the developers some time to address many issues, and re-boot the game to run a full cycle of the game, based on achieving a Faction-based end-game goal of researching a solution to the Zombocolypse.

The second round of Closed Beta Testing began on 1 December 2013, and ended on 21 February 2014, with the removal of the beta key requirement, a rebalance of the cooldowns to allow regular solo sessions throughout the day, and updates to allow single players to win the game. The developer have promised a Championship Trophy, which will be webcast, and the winner(s) will have their name engraved on the trophy as Round 1 Winners.

== See also ==
- List of multiplayer browser games
