= Dead Frontier =

2008 video game

- Publisher: Creaky Corpse Ltd
- Designer: Neil Yates
- Artist: Greg Taylor
- Engine: Unity
- Release: Open Beta: 21 April 2008
- Genres: Survival horror, MMORPG
- Modes: Single-player, multiplayer

Dead Frontier is a free-to-play, browser-based survival horror game which takes place in a post-apocalyptic, zombie-infested setting. It is operated by Creaky Corpse Ltd. Dead Frontier was released for open beta on April 21, 2008, and has over ten million registered accounts.

== Gameplay ==
Dead Frontier 3D version screenshot depicting players in the Inner City at the helicopter crash site

A free registration process is required from the user. Once the registration process is completed, the player creates an avatar which can be used to play in a 3D computer graphics environment (although, with certain settings accessible via the forum, players can revert to the classic 2D version, mentioned below). With the avatar, the player is also allowed to interact with multiple services involving trades of in-game items and communication with other players.

Dead Frontier takes place in Fairview City, a post-apocalyptic setting which is infested with zombies. As a co-op game, the survivors are able to fight the zombie hordes together and enter outposts spread through the city, safe havens for living and doing business, as well as barricade buildings to make personal outposts. Travel in the city is made on foot. Players are able to use an assortment of limited weapons and armor in order to survive the zombie infested streets.

The player starts the game by selecting a class, job or profession at Nastya's Holdout, an outpost which allows them to visit and interact with various services available in the game, such as a market, a bank, and a place for item storage.

Players are shown on the screen in the outpost as customizable avatars. Players interact with each other via the forums, an in-game CB radio (chatting in multiplayer rooms), as well as through private messaging (PM). There are a number of rules in place for player conduct, such as rules against scamming and bug abuse. The majority of rules apply to the forums or CB radio, and all the rules are enforced by moderators and administrators. As other MMORPGs introduced paid memberships, Dead Frontier introduced the concept of a Gold Membership, allowing players to directly influence the game mechanics through a credit system. Credits can be used to buy in-game weapons and items.

Weapons, armor, clothing, ammunition, limited edition items, mission items and Limited time stat boosters referred to as "Drugs" are a main part of gameplay within Dead Frontier. Weapons require the stat strength, and specific weapon stats to use them, and range normally from lower level items, all the way up to 100 stat points, 110 stat points, and 120 stat points. Armor only ranges up to 100 stat points, and requires only strength stat points to use.

== Development ==
Dead Frontier 2D version screenshot depicting several players in an Outpost Attack (one of the co-op features of the game)

On April 21, 2008, the game was released to the public as a beta version. Multiplayer mode and player versus player combat were released on July 15, 2008, allowing players to team up and play the game, or fight against each other. A player-run market system (named the Dead Frontier Mega Mall) was created on October 1, 2008, to facilitate trading among players. The barricading system, used to secure buildings, build personal outposts, and prevent zombies from entering them, was released on January 26, 2009. It allowed players to create their own outposts in the Inner City, where they could access services (market, bank, storage, etc.) as they could in the main outpost. A new inventory system was released on March 15, 2009, along with the ability to conduct private trades. A new market system was also released, replacing the Dead Frontier Mega Mall. Missions were released on July 19, 2009. They gave specific tasks to players, such as to destroy all infected in an area, for a cash and experience reward. Though some missions are glitched the game has an overall high rating within the player community.

On September 20, 2010, a 3D computer graphics version of the game was released to every registered player, having been previously tested by Gold Members. 3D support for interiors and barricading was released on May 25, 2012. As of 2015, Dead Frontier now has its own standalone client. A sequel, Dead Frontier 2, was released on September 5, 2018 via Steam.

== Dead Frontier: Outbreak ==
In September, 2008, as a promotion for Dead Frontier, a text based adventure game was released titled Dead Frontier: Outbreak. The game was followed by a sequel, Dead Frontier: Outbreak 2.

== See also ==
- List of multiplayer browser games
- List of free massively multiplayer online games
