= OurWorld =

ourWorld
- Developer: FlowPlay
- Platforms: Browser; Android
- Release: April 2008 (discontinued October 24, 2021)
- Genre: Virtual world
- Mode: Multiplayer

ourWorld was a virtual world containing a range of online games and activities. It was developed by FlowPlay, and was aimed at the teen and tween demographic.

== Gameplay ==
ourWorld combined an online virtual world with a range of casual gaming activities. Each player had an avatar and a condo which could be decorated.

An in-game currency, "Flow", was earned by talking, dancing, eating and drinking, and playing games. Flow could be exchanged for experience points and coins. ourWorld operated on a microtransaction business model which allowed players to purchase in-game "gems". Coins and gems were used to buy items for their avatar such as clothing, accessories or furniture. As players earned experience, they leveled up. This earned them prizes such as dance moves, access to new areas, vehicles, and privileges.

Players could also talk to each other, request friendship, gift items, create groups, send and receive mail, participate in contests and give "hearts". In 2013, Popularity, marriage and adoption were among the new features added, allowing wedding-rings to be exchanged and a player to become a child of another. Residents were people who had purchased one of several levels of residency cards, or paid money for monthly gems and special places.

There were "special" items in ourWorld. These included vehicles, tattoos, mystery boxes, sprites, inventories, residency passes, potions, wings, and ears/horns. Vehicles included skates, hoverboards, cars, skateboards, and jet-packs and the most recent to be added, dragons. These could sometimes be earned by leveling up. Others could be earned any level by gems. Sprites were animals that followed players' avatars around. Inventories increased the number of items players could keep in their inventory and photo album. Residency passes allow players to gain residency without buying a residency card. Potions allow players to change their avatar's appearance in ways they couldn't usually do (some kinds of food also did that). Mystery boxes (such as the Zodiac Mystery Box and the Bronco Mystery Box) contained random items that belonged in a certain theme. Previously, players could only visibly reach level 100 (players would continued to level up after that but it would not show on their profiles); however, in October 2012, the visible cap was lifted to 150, and it was lifted to 200.

== Reception ==
Joystiq questioned FlowPlay's business model, as many of the games in ourWorld are available on other casual gaming sites such as Newgrounds. Reviewer Stephen Greenwell of Gamezebo felt detached from the social aspect of ourWorld. He found conversation to be "dominated by netspeak and txtspeak" with all the depth "of a kiddie pool." However, the presentation was deemed to be "hip and edgy." with "Flash and Java used to create a gorgeous futuristic world." Overall, ourWorld was recommended for teens.

== History ==
Development on ourWorld began in January 2007 with a public Beta launch in April 2008. Since then, the product has received over 600,000 registrations. The company built the world with a team of 40 employees and contractors in Seattle, Shanghai, and India. In March 2007, Derrick Morton, the CEO of FlowPlay, raised about $500,000 in angel financing for the new company, with about one-quarter of that coming from the founders.

In June 2009, FlowPlay announced a partnership with PopCap Games resulting in the launch of a PopCap Arcade and Bejeweled Jewelry Store in its 1.7 million user ourWorld.com virtual world.

On February 10, 2009, FlowPlay announced that it had completed a long-term distribution agreement with Miniclip, LTD. FlowPlay's ourWorld was integrated into the Miniclip.com website – the largest online game destination in the world.

In March 2009, Tagged.com, the third-largest social networking site in the US, announced the integration of FlowPlay's ourWorld.com. The partnership advances Tagged's movement into online social gaming and expands their portfolio of innovative products for Tagged's 80 million worldwide registered members.

In October 19, 2020, the team of ourWorld.com made a downloadable client version of the game, because the site couldn't work anymore with Adobe Player, because of the expiring of Adobe. In November 16, 2020, all purchases inside the game were disabled which meant that the users could no longer buy or earn gems. The islands in the game were changed as they removed in-game games such as 'PopCap', 'Dance Planet', Critter Derby' etc. The gem codes are no longer working. Everyone who was a Resident or Zoe's Club Member remains as Zoe's Club Member and the membership was extended for a lifetime.

In October 24, 2021, at 11:59 EST the game shut down due to "bad acting in the game" which made it impossible for the company to support it any longer. They sent this news via messages in the game. The company also said that someday they may be back with a new version of the game and to keep checking the URL of the site.

== ourWorld Blogs ==
ourWorld has generated strong support from its community of users, spawning thousands of player-run blogs with a strong concentration hosted on WordPress.com. The player blogs generally publish news and information on events in the game along with secrets and cheats for advancing faster within the game. Although blogs are a significant part of the site, their forums play a huge part in the blogging process. Users sometimes post updates on the forums before the actual blogs.
