= Tenvi =

- The current logo of Tenvi
- Developers: NEOWIZ; Symmetric Space
- Publishers: KOR: Pmang (until 7/24/12); KOR: TooniLand (until 8/6/13; JP: Nexon
- Platform: Windows(2K/XP/Vista)
- Genre: Fantasy massively multiplayer online role-playing game
- Mode: MMO

Tenvi (Korean: 텐비) is a massively multiplayer online role-playing game released in 2008, in the same vein as MapleStory in that it was also side-scrolling and 2D, but it included many new features. The main differences are enhanced character sprites and the addition of a "Guardian" which followed your character around. On July 24, 2012, Tenvi was shut down, but was reopened as TenviXtreme under TooniLand on November 1, 2012. TooniLand has terminated services as of August 6, 2013.

== Gameplay ==
Like most MMORPGs, game play centers on venturing into dungeons and combating monsters in real-time. The players combat monsters and complete quests, in the process acquiring in-game currency, experience points (EXP), and various items. Players can kill monsters and complete quests alone, or they can form a party of up to 4 people.

== Characters ==
The game features 3 different races (each come in male or female), which can take up arms with different guardians. Here is a summary of the races:

The Guardians bring some unique features to the game:

- The characters can “become one” with their guardian. The Andras rides on its robot, the Talli transforms into its hero, and the Silva rides on its dragon.
- At level 10, the player is then asked to go talk to an NPC (NonPlayer Character) that gives the player a job enhancement. This gives you a two new skills (one passive, one active) which 'level up', or enhance, on their own for every two levels you gain.
- Both the pilot and guardian can equip different equipments which change their respective appearances
- At level 20 the player will be automatically given the ability to fly. However, there are some places where the player can not fly, such places as in party quests and jump quests.

Race : Andras
The Andras race most closely resembles humans. They specialize in advanced technology, so for that reason their guardian is a robot. Their robot wields swords, guns, and hammers. This race has more health than the others. Damage is based on "STR".

Race : Talli
The Talli race looks very much like elves in most games. They have white skin and pointed ears. They actually transform into their guardian which is a kind of dark hero. Their skills revolve around status effecting magic and damaging their enemies. Can use knuckle for long range(add int and wisdom for more power) and Daggers for Close range(Add str and agility for more power)

Race : Silva
The Silva race has brown skin and horns. Their guardian is a tamed Dragon. They are high in mp and use magic to fight.
