= Off-Road Velociraptor Safari =

2008 video game

- Developer: Flashbang Studios
- Publisher: Flashbang Studios
- Engine: Unity
- Platforms: Mac OS X, Windows, Unity plug-in required
- Release: January 29, 2008
- Genre: Vehicular combat
- Mode: Single-player

Off-Road Velociraptor Safari is a free downloadable vehicle combat video game released on January 29, 2008 by Flashbang Studios. The game requires the Unity plug-in to run, and can be downloaded from the developers' website. Players assume the role of a Velociraptor wearing a pith helmet and monocle, driving a jeep with a spiked flail attached, and must accrue as many points as possible in a four-minute period by performing stunts and running down other Velociraptor. Each time a Velociraptor is struck, the game's speed is reduced to slow motion and its catapulted body becomes the focus of the in-game camera. The game operates a global highscore, after each game the player is given a rank for that day and a separate rank compared to the highest ever scores, along with a breakdown of the bonuses they were awarded during play.

The game was developed over a period of eight weeks by a small team of developers, using the Unity game engine. The idea was originally drawn onto a whiteboard, after the drawing remained in the developer's office for a few days it was decided that it would be the next project undertaken by the team. Off-Road Velociraptor Safari received positive reviews from gaming websites for its macabre humor and gameplay, though it was noted that the game had not been fully optimized on release, causing the game to run slowly on less modern machines.

A sequel (working title "Off-Road Velociraptor Safari HD") was in development, but the project was put to rest in 2010.

== Gameplay ==
Players control a monocle- and pith helmet–wearing Velociraptor driving a jeep. The aim of the game is to attain a high score by performing stunts, damaging the jeep during collisions, collecting orbs, and killing the other Velociraptor which run around the area. The vehicle is equipped with a spiked ball and chain which can be deployed from the tailgate as many times as the player wishes. Deploying the spiked ball increases the difficulty of maneuvering the vehicle. The ball can be released from the chain at any time, if done so during a turn the weapon is launched forward. Players kill other Velociraptor by ramming them with the jeep or crushing them with the spiked ball which is dragged behind the vehicle. Slain dinosaurs can be dragged to exporters by the spiked ball and chain to gain extra points. Exporters are teleporting devices which transport the slain dinosaurs to the future.

Bonuses can be earned by achieving specific goals. If stunts or actions are repeated within a time limit, a score multiplier is earned and repeated actions boost the player's score further. Gameplay takes place in a single tropical jungle area, at the beginning of a game the jeep appears in a random location within the jungle. Stunt ramps are set up throughout the game area, along with the hills and valleys these facilitate long-distance jumps and other stunts. Each game takes four minutes, after the timer counts down to zero, the total score and any bonuses earned are shown. The player's ranking compared to other games played that day and the all-time highscores are also shown. Specific achievements can be gained by players, which are saved to their online profile, though the game can be played as a 'guest', which doesn't require a game profile to be created.

== Development ==
Players control a velociraptor driving a jeep

Flashbang Studios had planned to earn money from creating casual games so that they could create a quirky game without having to worry about sales and sustaining the studio. Although the company failed to create a financially successful casual game, by creating software for other companies they managed to acquire enough money to undertake an unusual project of their own choosing.

The original concept was drawn on a white board, after the image had been left on the board for several days, the developers decided that it "pretty much had to be the next game." Initially the studio had intended to incorporate weapons into the game, but first developed the tow chain which would be used to transport slain Velociraptor. The use of a chain was inspired by the controversial game Carmageddon. The chain was designed to be a place-holder, to be replaced by a skinned rope. However, it was decided that the chain itself was acceptable without further modification. Plans to include additional weapons were dropped; the flail alone proved to be effective enough.

When development began in December 2007, the studio had employed five full-time team members. Development took eight weeks, though creation of the Velociraptor and jeep models had already been started before development began. Other staff were working on the title before then, but two key members were involved in the Independent Games Festival. A teaser trailer was released on January 18, 2008; quickly garnering interest from gaming blogs such as Kotaku and Destructoid. In an interview the developers hinted that a non-free downloadable version with extra content may be produced, or that advertisements may be introduced to the site. The company also revealed plans to continue developing free games with a development time of four to eight weeks. The most popular of these games will be further developed and released on platforms such as WiiWare, PlayStation Network or Xbox Live Arcade.

== Reception ==
Off-Road Velociraptor Safari received a positive reception, reviewers praised the game as fun to play and addictive, particularly in relation to the short development time. Reviewers found issues with slowdown and variable frame rates, though the game was updated after reviewers highlighted the problems. Atomic Gamer's Brian Beck awarded the game a score of 90%, calling it "a fun, rewarding game" and citing the lack of restraints with the exception of the time limit. Games journalist John Walker, writing for Rock Paper Shotgun, described the game as "a stupid amount of fun" and found himself "...fairly stunned it can be played in a browser window." Reviewers noted some technical problems, John Bardinelli described the game's controls as "a bit clunky" and noted that even after installing the Unity plug-in the game has "a long load time" regardless of internet connection speed. Brian Beck stated that the game was not "fully optimized", resulting in players using less modern computers being unable to run the game smoothly.

Jay Is Games' John Bardinelli found the game's unusual premise to be the source of its playability, "The raw dose of driving, destruction and dinosaurs is enough to get just about any gamer's blood pumping". Despite this, he found the game's premise of crushing Velociraptor slightly disturbing, but added "there's just enough fiction to the setting to keep realism at bay." Bit-tech's Joe Martin suggested that though longevity could be an issue for serious players, Off-Road Velociraptor Safari is "unmatched" as a game which can be played for short periods of time. Channel 4 described the game as "a real laugh" and "one of our favourite coffee-break games of the moment." Destructoid's Hamza Aziz enjoyed the game, "it's hard not to love it", but found the slow motion "gets old and frustrating after a while."

== Planned sequel ==
A sequel called "Off-Road Velociraptor HD" was planned with a Q4, 2010 release date. It was available to pre-order off the official site and anyone who purchased the downloadable version of the original received an automatic free pre-order. Later Blurst announced "Off-Road Velociraptor HD" had been canceled due to financial problems and will most likely not see the light of the day.
