= Shakes & Fidget =

2009 video game

Shakes & Fidget is a free-to-play, browser-based, massively multiplayer online role-playing video game (MMORPG) developed and published by the German company Playa Games GmbH. The game is based on a webcomic of the same name, which was created by Oskar Pannier and Marvin Clifford as a parody of World of Warcraft. It was originally released in 2009 for desktop browsers, followed by a mobile version for Android in 2011 and iOS in 2012. It is available in 9 languages – English, German, French, Italian, Slovak, Czech, Spanish, Hungarian and Polish.

The game features satirical and humorous elements, parodying many games, books, films, television shows, myths and fairy tales.

== Gameplay ==
Players interact with the game by clicking on various elements on the screen to perform an action, such as completing quests, travelling to dungeons, or purchasing items. Many activities require a waiting period before completion, making Shakes & Fidget partially an idle game. Each player can create one or more characters, which gain experience levels during play, acquire new equipment, and improve their attributes: strength, dexterity, intelligence, constitution and luck.

In the game, there are two primary currencies: gold and mushrooms. While gold is earned exclusively through in-game activities, such as completing quests or selling items, mushrooms can be purchased in the in-game store with real-world money.

=== Classes ===
When a player creates a new character, they can choose from several different classes, each offering a unique gameplay experience.

List of classes
Class	Main attribute	Abilities
Warrior	Strength	Can block attacks with a shield.
Scout	Dexterity	Has a chance to evade attacks.
Mage	Intelligence	Attacks cannot be blocked or dodged.
Assassin	Dexterity	Attacks twice per round.
Battle Mage	Strength	Unleashes an arcane comet at the start of a combat.
Berserker	Strength	Has a chance to attack again.
Demon Hunter	Dexterity	Has a chance to be revived after dying.
Druid	Intelligence	Can transform into a bear or eagle to gain bonus damage.
Bard	Intelligence	Plays a melody to increase weapon damage.
Necromancer	Intelligence	Can summon undead minions.
Paladin	Strength	Can switch to defensive stance to heal.
Plague Doctor	Dexterity	Deals bonus poison damage.

=== Races ===
When choosing character's appearance, players can select from eight different races. Although the races are primarily a cosmetical feature, they also provide small bonuses or penalties to certain attributes.

List of races
Race	Strength	Dexterity	Intelligence	Constitution	Luck
Human	0	0	0	0	0
Orc	+1	0	-1	0	0
Elf	-1	+2	0	-1	0
Dark Elf	-2	+2	+2	-1	0
Dwarf	0	-2	-1	+2	+1
Goblin	-2	+2	0	-1	+1
Gnome	-2	+3	-1	-1	+1
Demon	+3	-1	0	+1	-3

=== Tavern ===
Tavern is the location where players can accept expeditions, which are quests that grant experience points, items, or gold upon completion. Each expedition consumers a certain amount of thirst, which can be refilled either by drinking a beer or by waiting for the daily reset at midnight, when thirst is fully restored.

=== Dungeons ===
When a character reaches level 10, players gain access to dungeons. Each dungeon consists of ten different creatures that can drop powerful items when defeated. As of 2025, the game features 33 different dungeons, many of which include encounters based on famous characters or fantasy settings.

List of dungeons
Number	Dungeon	Based on
1	Desecrated Catacombs	Archetype of a fantasy dungeon
2	The Mines of Gloria	Mines of Moria, a place in Middle-earth
3	The Ruins of Gnark	Lost Ruins of Arnak
4	The Cutthroat Grotto	Archetype of pirates in popular culture
5	The Emerald Scale Altar	Reptilian humanoids
6	The Toxic Tree	Archetype of poisonous monsters in fantasy
7	The Magma Stream	Archetype of fire and lava monsters in fantasy
8	The Frost Blood Temple	Archetype of frost monsters in fantasy
9	The Pyramid of Madness	Archetype of a pyramid in fantasy
10	Black Skull Fortress	Archetype of a castle in fantasy
11	Circus of Terror	Archetype of various circus performers
12	Hell	Hell in Abrahamic religions
13	Dragon's Hoard	Different types of dragons
14	House of Horrors	Horror films
15	The 13th floor	Playa Games GmbH itself
16	3rd League of Superheroes	Different superheroes
17	Time-honored School of Magic	Harry Potter film series
18	Hemorridor	The Hobbit film series
19	Easteros	Game of Thrones series
20	Dojo of Childhood Heroes	Cartoon and anime characters
21	Tavern of the Dark Doppelgangers	Shakes and Fidget itself
22	City of Intrigues	Game of Thrones series
23	School of Magic Express	Harry Potter film series
24	Nordic Gods	Nordic mythology
25	Ash Mountain	The Lord of the Rings film series
26	Playa HQ	Playa Games GmbH itself
27	Mount Olympus	Greek mythology
28	Monster Grotto	Characters from different films and shows
29	Arcade of the Old Pixel Icons	Characters from different video games
30	The Server Room	Playa Games GmbH itself
31	Workshop of the Hunters of the Undead	Characters from different video games, films and shows
32	Retro TV Legends	Characters from different films and shows
33	The Meeting Room	Playa Games GmbH itself

=== Tower ===
Once a player defeats the first nine dungeons, they gain access to the Tower. The Tower features 100 unique encounters inspired by famous fairy tales, fables and folklores. The player's character is accompanied by three non-player companions when fighting the enemies within the tower.

List of tower encounters
Floor	Encounter	Based on
1	Living Cake Man	Gingerbread man
2	Green Fairy Drinkerbell	Tinker Bell
3	Tinvalid	Tin soldier
4	Harmless Teddy Bear	Teddy bears
5	Flowerlina	Thumbelina
6	Tooth Fairy	Tooth fairy
7	Ugly Chick	The Ugly Duckling
8	Warbling Birdie	The Nightingale
9	Well-Meaning Fairy	Fairy godmother
10	Trickeribook's Cheatinchild	Mowgli
11	Singing Dumpling	Little Round Bun
12	Puppeteer's Right	Hand puppets
13	Grinning Cat	Cheshire Cat
14	Ambitious Frog	The Frog Prince
15	Pinociwhatsit	Pinocchio
16	3x3 Wishes	The Three Fairies
17	Bootlegged Puss	Puss in Boots
18	Dotty from Kansas	Dorothy Gale
19	The Last Airgazer	Avatar: The Last Airbender
20	A Rabbit and a Hedgehog	The Hare and the Hedgehog
21	Holger Nilsson	The Wonderful Adventures of Nils
22	High-Spirited Ghost	Casper
23	Blood-Red Riding Hood	Red Riding Hood
24	Snowflake	Snow Maiden
25	Star Money	The Star Money
26	Miss Match	The Little Match Girl
27	Ice Queen	The Snow Queen
28	Badly Raised Boys	Max and Moritz
29	Lambikins and Fishy	The Lambkin and the Little Fish
30	Donkey Shot	Don Quixote
31	Street Thief with Monkey	Aladdin
32	Alice in Wonder	Alice in Wonderland
33	Penterabbit	Easter Bunny
34	Dynamic Peter	Peter Pan
35	Foolish Princess	Snow White
36	Pleasure Addict	Mad Hatter
37	Amnastasia Rubliovka	Anastasiya Romanova
38	Useless Livestock	Town Musicians of Bremen
39	Humpty Dumpty	Humpty Dumpty
40	King Chinbeard	King Thrushbeard
41	Sandman	Sandman
42	John or Tom?	Rumpelstiltskin
43	Scarecrow	Scarecrow
44	Mirrored Fool	Till Eulenspiegel
45	Three Little Pigs	The Three Little Pigs
46	Goose in Luck	The Goose that Laid the Golden Eggs
47	Simpleminded Chicken Thief	Jack and the Beanstalk
48	Baba Yaga	Baba Yaga
49	Merlin	Merlin
50	Julio and Romy	Romeo and Juliet
51	Prince in Shepherd's Skin	The Swineherd
52	Robin the Redistributor	Robin Hood
53	Ali the Sesame Opener	Aladdin and the King of Thieves
54	Freshly Dressed Emperor	The Emperor's New Clothes
55	Dumbo	The Golden Goose
56	Hansel and Gretel	Hansel and Gretel
57	Bear Fear	Goldilocks and the Three Bears
58	Pokerhontas	Pocahontas
59	Mass Fly Murderer	The Brave Little Tailor
60	Cinderella	Cinderella
61	The Enchanting Genie	Genie
62	Bronycorn	My Little Pony
63	Hulda the Cloud Fairy	Mother Holle
64	Leprechore	Leprechaun
65	Robber Hopsenplops	The Robber Hotzenplotz
66	Thorny Lion	Androcles and the Lion
67	Aquirella the Dazzler	The Little Mermaid
68	Prince Charming	Prince Charming
69	B. O. Wolf	Beowulf
70	Peter the Wolf	Peter and the Wolf
71	Beautiful Princess	Jasmine
72	Fearless Wanderer	The Story of the Youth Who Went Forth to Learn What Fear Was
73	Red&White Forever	Snow-White and Rose-Red
74	Friendly Snowman	The Snowman
75	Parsifal	Perceval
76	Brother Barfly	Friar Tuck
77	King Arthur	King Arthur
78	Sigi Musclehead	Siegfried
79	The Pied Piper of Jamelin	Pied Piper of Hamelin
80	The Guys from Oz	The Wonderful Wizard of Oz
81	"Little" John	Little John
82	The Easter Bunny	Santa Claus
83	Honey Robbear	Winnie-the-Pooh
84	Shirk the Ogre	Shrek
85	Cozy Bear	Baloo
86	Number Nip	Rübezahl
87	Three Hungry Bears	Goldilocks and the Three Bears
88	Seven Hostages	The Wolf and the Seven Young Goats
89	Seven Dwarfs	Seven Dwarfs
90	Respectable Dragon Slayer	Saint George and the Dragon
91	Ducat Donkey	The Wishing-Table, the Gold-Ass, and the Cudgel in the Sack
92	Bean Counter	The Princess and the Pea
93	Happy Dragon	Tabaluga
94	Shockheaded Jack	Shock-Headed Peter
95	Papa Frost	Father Frost
96	Dream Couple	Beauty and the Beast
97	Three Ghosts	A Christmas Carol
98	Sleepy Princess	Sleeping Beauty
99	Nanobot Porridge	Sweet Porridge
100	Barbpunzel	Rapunzel

=== Continuous Loop of Idols ===
After reaching level 222, players unlock the Continuous Loop of Idols, an area featuring 21 opponents based on famous streamers and YouTubers.

Floor	Encounter	Origin
1	DoctorBenx	German content-creator
2	Zakreble	Polish content-creator
3	Golden Gianpy	Italian content-creator
4	Willyrex	Spanish content-creator
5	Alvaro845	Spanish content-creator
6	Paul Terra	German content-creator
7	Spieletrend	German content-creator
8	FattyPillow	Czech content-creator
9	Gimper	Polish content-creator
10	Unge	German content-creator
11	KeysJore	German content-creator
12	Aypierre	French content-creator
13	Mandzio	Polish content-creator
14	Boruciak	Polish content-creator
15	Fifqo	Slovak content-creator
16	Zsoze	Hungarian content-creator
17	ZeboPL	Polish content-creator
18	Dhalucard	German content-creator
19	Earliboy	German content-creator
20	Skate702	German content-creator
21	Dorzer	German content-creator

== Reception ==
The game won the Deutscher Entwicklerpreis award for the Best Casual Game in 2009, and received the Best Browser Game award from GameStar in 2010.
