= Man vs. Machine (video game) =

2012 video game

- Developer: MuchDifferent
- Engine: Unity
- Release: 2012
- Genre: First-person shooter

Man vs. Machine was a team-based first-person shooter browser game developed by MuchDifferent. The game was playable only once, and created with the sole purpose of breaking the Guinness World Record for "Most players in an online FPS battle," which it achieved on January 29, 2012 with 999 players. The game was hosted on eight different servers and created with the Unity game engine.

== World record attempt ==
In January 2012, non-profit MuchDifferent announced that they would attempt to set the world record for most players in a first-person shooter battle with Man vs. Machine. All users on the webpage at the time of the attempt would have a chance at participating, and tickets for $29.99 were purchasable to guarantee a spot, with proceeds going to Engineers Without Borders. The game set the record with 999 concurrent players, falling 1 player short of the supported maximum of 1,000 due to a server crash. MuchDifferent plans to use the technology for other applications and provide it to game developers in the future.

The game beat the previous record of 600 players which was set by PlanetSide. Man vs. Machine's record was beaten by PlanetSide 2 on January 24, 2015 when 1,158 players participated in a battle.
