= Forumwarz =

2008 video game

- Developer: Crotch Zombie Productions
- Publisher: Crotch Zombie Productions
- Designers: Robin "Evil Trout" Ward; Mike "Jalapeno Bootyhole" Drach; Jason "BINGEBOT 2015" Kogan
- Engine: Ruby on Rails
- Platform: Web browser
- Release: February 7, 2008
- Genre: Turn based RPG
- Modes: Single-player, multiplayer

Forumwarz is a multiplayer browser-based role-playing game that is a parody of Internet culture designed by Crotch Zombie Productions, a Toronto-based company run by Robin Ward, Mike Drach, and Jason Kogan. Written in the Ruby on Rails web application framework using the Haml markup language, the game launched on February 7, 2008. In the first month since the game launched, around 30,000 users signed up.

Forumwarz is notable for its humorous and sometimes ribald writing and references to Internet memes. Described as an "internet meta-game", it has been featured in both Wired News and DigitalJournal.com, and was described by Gawker.com as "stupid, insulting, and really damn clever". To ensure new players are aware of the potentially — and deliberately — offensive content of the game, players must confirm that they are "not offended easily" before they can begin playing. In August 2008, a second episode of the game was in preparation prior to release; it was released in Beta to a small number of players in mid-September. Crotch Zombie released Episode 2 on October 15, 2008. Prior to its release they provided sneak peeks and spoilers of Episode 2 content, while also reaching out to users to provide in-game content. Closed beta began on September 15, inviting contributors of Episode 2 to help test out the content. On January 20, 2010, Forumwarz released its third episode. As of January, 2017 the game had over 250,000 accounts.

== Plot and setting ==
Unlike many traditional role-playing games (RPGs), Forumwarz takes place on a fake, parodic version of the Internet. The primary battlegrounds are in the form of virtual internet forums, as opposed to the fantasy settings found in traditional RPGs. Parody themes include furries, script kiddies, Boing Boing, Apple Computer, ricers, 4chan, Ron Paul, Fark, gamers, Bill O'Reilly, Otaku, Cory Doctorow, and the Church of Scientology.

The player begins as a bored Internet user, searching on a parodied search engine (a thinly veiled analogue of Google). Soon their search query is interrupted by an instant message from "Shallow Esophagus", a mysterious non-player character who introduces them to the concept of "pwnage".

The player soon begins "pwning", or attacking, forums through various trolling methods. Following the first mission, one of four character classes can be chosen — "Emo Kid", "Troll", "Camwhore", or "Hacker". The player may also choose to stay as a "Re-Re", and later select the "Permanoob" class. The archetypes were chosen as the most "narcissistic and crude web forum stereotypes". As forums become increasingly difficult to pwn, characters earn experience points in the form of "cred", thus improving their statistics.

== Gameplay ==
Screenshot of the website's character page. The colors and imagery vary on what class the player picks.

Forumwarz takes place on a parodic version of the Internet, and the interface reflects this with an Instant Messaging client, online shopping for virtual items and services, and Internet forum battlegrounds. The Instant Messaging Client is called sTalk, a pun on "stalk", and a parody of Google's IM client gTalk.

The combat system is turn-based, and the player is given a set number of forum visits per day that they use to improve their character and proceed through the storyline. The player may attack virtual forums, each based on a different theme, with various attacks suited to their character class. Attacks consist of posting varying obnoxious comments and trolling, via an array of attacks specific to the user class including "self-mutilation" (Emo Kids), "threaten to contact authorities" (Camwhores), "ASCII art attacks" (Trolls), "font changing" (Hacker) and Tech support (Permanoob).

While attacking, the virtual inhabitants of the forum will respond and retaliate, causing the player damage. The hit points used in most RPGs are replaced with "ego" in Forumwarz: if a player's ego is reduced to zero, the player is defeated. Players can restore their ego using the game's version of health boosts: anti-depressants. For each thread in a forum that is successfully "pwned," or derailed through persistent attacking, the player gains "Cred" and will be sent gifts from random Internet users as a reward the following day.

Side quests include a very brief text adventure game loosely based on the urban opera "Trapped in the Closet," featuring R. Kelly as well as a second, much longer text adventure unlocked in Episode 2.

Players have the opportunity to purchase "Brownie Points" using their own (real) money. Brownie Points are used to buy Episode 2 and 3. Brownie Points can be used to buy "illegal game enhancements" that allow for accelerated progress through the game by giving the player many more forum visits than the standard 4 per day, an attack that instantly defeats forums, or large amounts of in-game currency. However, buying these enhancements will exclude the player from competitive aspects of the game unless he purchases an "un-cheat", which removes all in-game items and currency, so that no competitive advantage can be gained by "cheating". The "Brownie points" can also be used to buy custom avatars or forum nicknames, for themselves or other players.

== User-built content ==
Players are able to contribute to their own forums using forumbuildr v2.0 Beta, an in-game application named after Web 2.0 jargon. Each week, players vote on a topic to collectively build. Once a topic is chosen, players submit and vote on its components, including the content, logo and style sheet. At the end of the week, the forum is published and can be played by users.

In March 2009, itembuildr was introduced, which, in a similar style to forumbuildr, allows players to contribute item descriptions and images which are then added to the game in the form of purchasable items.

== Multiplayer ==
Players also have the choice to interact in the multiplayer aspects of the game. This may be co-operatively, such as players joining in klans, to work together in Domination raids, or just use is as a place to interact with others aside from Flamebate (the standard forums). On the other hand, players may compete against each other, in several mini-games, such as the above-mentioned Domination, in which players earn scoops and Medals as a result. Players can also compete in INCIT, in which a random picture taken from Flickr is shown, and a motivational poster must be created, with a title and motivational text related to the picture. Players then vote which of the posters is the most amusing, the poster capturing the most votes being the winner. Another multiplayer feature is Kyoubai, an in-game auction house launched on January 16, 2009, in which players can bid on items for sale from other players. The mascot of Kyoubai is BidSquid, a cartoon squid with a cowboy hat and gavel. BidSquid was designed by Dooomcat Studios, who also did the class portraits and designed the homepage.

== Technical aspects ==
Forumwarz was written using tools including Ruby on Rails, MySQL, Haml, memcached, script.aculo.us and the Prototype Javascript Framework and Phusion Passenger behind Nginx. Despite the approximately 5 million dynamic requests a day (varying from 55 to 75 requests per second depending on the time of day) and 25Gb of data transfer, Crotch Zombie uses a single 3 GHz Xeon server (due to the small size of the requests).

One of the elements used in the creation of Forumwarz was the creation of a machine translation tool, called Unintelligencer. The tool translates standard written text into "unintelligent", mimicking "a literate person's text into something that wouldn't look out of place on a YouTube comment". The tool was one of the elements used by the Forumwarz creators to create unique personalities for the artificial denizens of its simulated forums.
