= Chilltime =

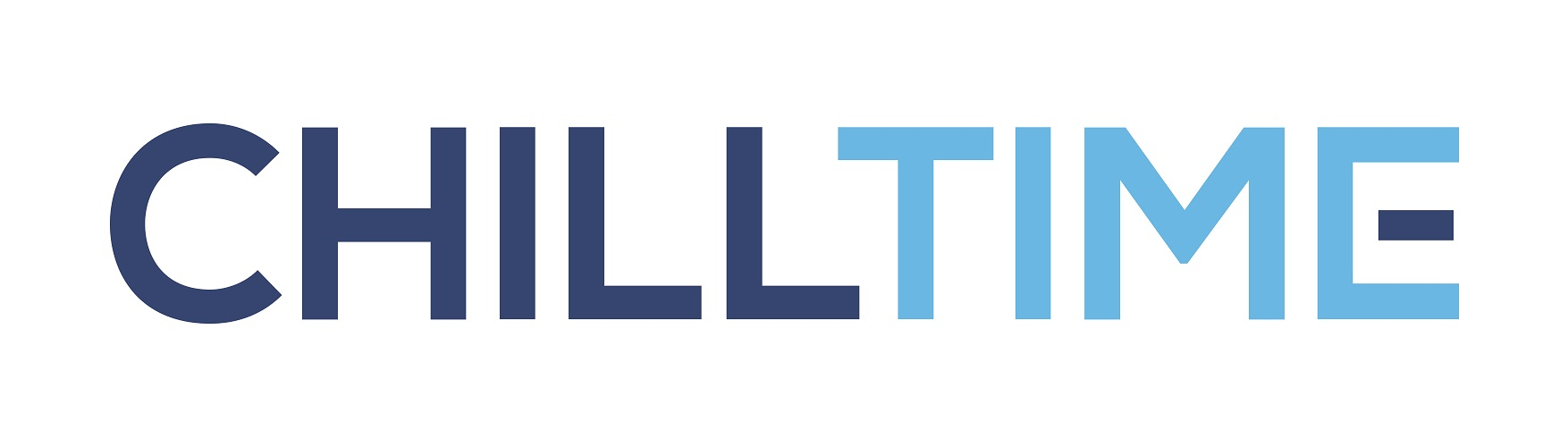
- Company type: Private company
- Founded: February 2007
- Headquarters: Lisbon, Portugal
- Area served: Worldwide
- Founder: Daniel Vila Boa
- Key people: Daniel Vila Boa (CEO)
- Industry: Venture Builder
- Website: Chilltime.com
- Current status: Active

Chilltime is a technology and product innovation company, based in Taguspark, Oeiras, Portugal. They develop and commercialize in-house products, as well as conceptualize, build and grow products as a technology partner. The company was founded by Daniel Vila Boa in 2007, since the foundation the company has had three different phases, a Social Network, a Video Games Developer and a Venture Builder.

== History ==
=== Social network ===
The company started out as a social networking site called NetJovens for the Portuguese youth in 2004.

The project grew to a point where it gained the interest of the magazine publisher Edimpresa. In 2007, Edimpresa was a joint venture between the European publishing company Edipresse and Impresa a Portuguese media conglomerate. Edimpresa acquired a 51% majority stake of the company in October 2007 for close to one million euros.

In 2008, Netjovens.pt re-branded to Chilltime.com in attempt to make the Social networking site go international. During this period the Impresa bought the remaining 50pct stake in Edimpresa from European publisher Edipresse. The 51pct stake of Chilltime now belonged to Portuguese media conglomerate Impresa.

In December 2009, the founder bought the 51pct stake owned by Impresa for an undisclosed amount. Impresa stated that the company no longer made sense in its portfolio considering international competition from social networking sites and that it would focus on its national businesses, the founder stated that in this new phase Chilltime would focus new projects that were not based on advertising model, neither on the Portuguese national market.

=== World War Online ===
World War Online is a freemium PvP real-time strategy browser game developed and published by Chilltime in 2010.

World War Online is currently available in over 100 countries and has active players in over 50 of them.

==== Gameplay ====
Players build multiple types of bases to produce four types of resources: money, food, bricks and grain which can then be used to train military units that can be used in offence and defense. The players can also invest in WWO-influence, a limited resource that can be used to create more bases, accelerate their upgrades or train strong units.

Once they are strong enough, players then join squads to conquer capitals and getting points on the leaderboard. At the end of each season, which lasts around four months, the winners get real, physical medals as a reward.

==== Development and release ====
World War Online was released in August 2010 by Chilltime.

== Web Summit ==
Chilltime was selected as one of the 66 Portuguese startup companies to represent Portugal at the Web Summit of 2016.
