= Urban Dead =

2005 video game

- Developer: Kevan Davis
- Designer: Kevan Davis
- Platform: Web browser
- Release: July 3, 2005
- Genre: Survival horror MMORPG
- Mode: Multiplayer

Urban Dead was a free-to-play HTML/text-based massively multiplayer online role-playing game created by British developer Kevan Davis. Set in a quarantined region of the fictional city of Malton, it dealt with the aftermath of a zombie outbreak. Players entered the game either as a survivor or a zombie, each with different abilities and limitations. Survivors became zombies when they are killed, while zombies could be "revivified" with appropriate technology, returning to life as a survivor – any character played for long would thus spend some time alive and some as a zombie. There were no non-player characters in the game: all survivors and zombies were controlled by players.

Urban Dead went live on July 3, 2005, and shut down on March 14, 2025. The shutdown was stated to be the result of the Online Safety Act in the UK, which they stated brought the threat of "corporate-sized fines" to independent solo web projects with social features.

On February 20, 2026, a successor project was released, Worldwide Dead, created by a former player of the original game.

== Gameplay ==
A screenshot of a survivor standing outside a fire station

Gameplay involved zombies breaking into safe houses and attacking the inhabitants, and survivors trying to defend the buildings by barricading them and killing any zombies present. Safe houses tended to be located in or near buildings where useful items could be found, such as shopping malls, police stations, hospitals, and the laboratories of the zombie-related NecroTech corporation. Cooperation between players was not strictly enforced. Internal fighting between survivors and zombies was a frequent occurrence. Urban Dead had no economy. Survivor characters could loot supplies from abandoned buildings indefinitely, but could not trade, sell, or give them to other players.

New players began the game as one of the three survivor classes; Military, Scientist or Civilian; or as a Zombie. Each side in the struggle had its own advantages and disadvantages. Survivors moved twice as fast as low-level zombies and were able to employ various weapons and tools. Survivor characters could communicate with each other in-game via speech, radio broadcasting, graffiti and text messaging. They could also barricade building entrances, keeping zombies at bay. Zombies, often referred to as "zeds", were limited to using claws, teeth, and blunt melee weapons. However, they could self-revive with full hit points when killed, whereas a survivor needed another player to revive them after death if they did not wish to play as a zombie. Higher level zombies could communicate with each other via a crude form of zombie speech, as well as through various groaning noises and hand gestures. It was possible to switch sides in the conflict: a survivor character that was killed would rise up as a zombie, and zombie characters could be brought back to life by a survivor who had the relevant skills and items.

Players received action points as time passed, which were used up any time they moved, fought, or undertook any other sort of activity. One action point was gained every half-hour of real time, up to a maximum of 50 points. When a character's action points dropped to zero or lower, that character was unable to perform any action until they gained further points: survivors fell asleep and zombies' brains ceased to function. Should a survivor have run out of action points whilst in an unsecured area, they would be at great risk of attack by zombies during sleep. Players needed to make sure that their survivor characters were in a safe place before logging out, encouraging quick raids from fortified safe houses. The use of action points as a limit on character actions was similar to the systems of several other free MMORPGs such as Kingdom of Loathing.

As players damaged their opponents or performed certain other actions, their experience points increased. While survivors could also gain experience from performing a variety of actions, such as healing other characters or repairing damage to buildings, zombies could only gain experience points by attacking other characters or objects in the game world. When players gained enough experience points, they could buy new skills. A character could only buy survivor skills while alive, and only zombie skills while dead; although skills of one type were not lost if the character dies or is revived, most survivor skills could not be used by zombies, and vice versa. Survivor characters could effectively learn the skills of all survivor classes, not just the class they began with, though skills outside of their chosen class could be more expensive. For a long time, the highest level that a player could reach if all skills were purchased was 42. However, due to the skill "Brain Rot" making it more difficult to get revives, many players opted to leave it unpurchased and as a result there were a greater number of players at level 41 as opposed to level 42. On October 14, 2008, a new zombie skill "Flesh Rot" was added, thus making it possible to reach level 43. With the new additions of the skills "Bellow" and "Scout safehouse" in August 2010, the highest attainable level became 45.

Survivors who died and returned as zombies did not have to switch sides -- they could gather at designated "revive points" scattered throughout the city where they would wait for survivors with the relevant skills and equipment to revive them. Revive points were considered neutral ground and survivors were generally discouraged from killing zombies found there. Some players and groups on both sides also set their own distinct goals, many of which were set for purely role-playing purposes. Urban Dead was not limited to survivor versus zombie combat. Groups of survivors could attack other survivors, known as player killing. Within the game, this was viewed as an act of murder; however, it was not against the game rules and was seen by some more advanced players as playing the game on "Hard" due to only receiving half the experience points that one would receive for attacking zombies. Individuals that engaged in this behavior were often tracked by bounty hunters. Some zombie groups used living characters as spies and saboteurs, usually during or in preparation for a major attack on a safe house (mainly shopping malls). These collaborators were often referred to as "zombie spies" or "death cultists."

== Development ==
Urban Dead was created by Kevan Davis, a freelance video game designer and web developer, in 2005. Davis was inspired by a similar game called Vampires!, which was created by a friend, and play-by-mail games. These were combined with elements of NetHack, MUSHes, interactive fiction and a zombie infection simulation he had developed in 2003. This resulted in the creation of a game which required approximately 10 minutes of planning and play a day, involving exploration, interaction and item discovery.

In 2023, the Parliament of the United Kingdom passed the Online Safety Act. By 2025 Davis found it unfeasible to implement the stricter age verification and child-protection measures called for in the act. At the beginning of March, Davis announced the site would shut down at noon on Friday, March 14, UTC.

== Reception ==
A 2007 review in The Escapist was positive, calling Urban Dead "an enjoyably deep web game". The game has attracted some attention decade or longer after its release. In 2017, a reviewer for Rock, Paper, Shotgun praised its execution, despite noting that it suffered from now-obsolete web browser-game design. Similar opinions were expressed by another reviewer in 2018.

In retrospective coverage ahead of the game's shutdown, PC Gamer's Jake Tucker also praised the "large-scale strategic element" that developed within the game as players formed organized groups. Tucker quoted fellow writer Andy Chalk's reflection on an early siege of one of the in-game malls as "incredibly intense and satisfying, and a remarkable feat of spontaneous coordination among people around the world. I fell away [from the game] in 2006, but it still breaks my heart a little that it's coming to an end."

== See also ==
- List of multiplayer browser games
