= X-Wars =

2002 video game

- Developers: Sebastian Lagemann (from 2023), Mediatainment GmbH (from 2007), Sebastian Lagemann (before 2007), Nils Mitoussis (before 2007)
- Publishers: Mediatainment GmbH (from 2007), Gameforge AG (before 2007), Gamigo AG (before 2007)
- Producers: Sebastian Lagemann, Nils Mitoussis
- Platform: cross-browser
- Release: 2002
- Genres: MMOG, RTS, CMS
- Mode: Multiplayer

X-Wars was a massively multiplayer browser game, in which thousands of players interact in realtime. It contains elements of real-time strategy and construction and management simulation.

The player colonizes and develops planets, designs, builds and commands starships as well as trades, allies and battles with other players.

The game has become popular in the early stages of massively multiplayer browser games from 2002 in Germany, mainly for its complexity and innovative features. Later it has been released internationally in six languages.

X-Wars won the "Superbrowsergame Gold Award" of 2005 in the category of the largest games (more than 20,000 players). This prize had been the most prominent massively multiplayer browser specific game contest at the time and was awarded after several voting rounds including communities and an expert committee. The developers were then invited to the Giga Games TV show (NBC).

The popular German mainstream computer magazine c't awarded it the best free browsergame. The German gaming magazine PC Action rated it 90%, which has been the best rating.

== Details ==
The game offers a deep complexity with many fractions, technology dependencies and interaction possibilities which were innovative at the time of introduction.

In particular, the possibility of designing own starship types with own names from a broad range of components contributed to the game's complexity and popularity and the distinction in comparison to other games. As a result, the X-Wars universe is populated by thousands of different starship types which try to gain strategic advantages in battles.

== History ==
The game has been developed by Sebastian Lagemann and Nils Mitoussis from 2002 and has been published initially in German language. Gamigo published the game in Germany, Switzerland and Austria. Later, it was licensed internationally to Gameforge. French, English, Polish, Spanish and Portuguese versions have been released.

In 2007, Mediatainment acquired X-Wars and continued game development and operation. The game went offline in April 2012.

== Resurrection ==
In 2023, Sebastian Lagemann, one of the original co-developers of X-Wars, began rebuilding the game under the title X-Wars Resurrection. A preview of the original game engine was made available in April 2023 as a precursor to the new version.

The rebuilt game, operated by Gomsilo B.V., launched its first alpha test round in June 2026, followed by a second alpha round opening on 25 July 2026, featuring economy systems, blueprint missions, and mobile colony operations. The game is available as a free-to-start browser title with an optional subscription, requiring no download, and is playable across desktop and mobile browsers.
