= Web Sudoku =

Puzzle website

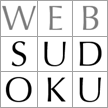
- Logo of Web Sudoku

- Screenshot Screenshot of Web Sudoku's homepage.
- Available in: English; French; German; Spanish
- Owners: Gideon Greenspan and Rachel Lee
- Website: www.websudoku.com
- Registration: optional
- Launched: June 2005; 21 years ago

Web Sudoku is a Sudoku website which was rated as one of the best 50 fun and games websites by Time. It was founded by Gideon Greenspan and Rachel Lee. The website was rated as the 7265th best website in the world by Jonathan Harchick in his book The World's Best Websites. In 2006, Greenspan claimed that about three million people play on the site, adding that the numbers "are still growing very rapidly from week to week". He added that some of the players solve dozens of puzzles every day. It is written in PHP. The Web Version has four levels, being Easy, Medium, Hard and Evil.

Web Sudoku also has a deluxe version. It features a downloadable app. This app offers offline play, more variations and difficulties, and levels, printing, the ability to go full screen and other features (such as customization). The app is for Windows and MacOS, though the Mac version is 32-bit only. There is a free-trial version. For activating the copy, a license key is sent via E-Mail, but is also accessible by their website.
