= Torn (2004 video game) =

2003 video game

- The Android app icon for Torn
- Developer: Torn LTD
- Publisher: Torn LTD
- Platforms: Online (HTML), iOS, Android
- Release: 15 November 2004
- Genre: MMORPG
- Mode: Multiplayer

Torn is a text-based, crime-themed massively multiplayer online role-playing game. The game was developed by the British developer Joe Chedburn in 2004, and is one of the largest text-based online video games. The game involves a virtual world based around crime and business. It has an in-game currency, which can be obtained in many ways, like mugging, drug trafficking, bank investments, dividends paid out from stocks, missions, and selling game items via the item market with other players among many other ways.

== History ==
=== 2004 ===
Torn was first launched in its Alpha phase in August 2004. The game involves a virtual world based around gang violence and business. Like many role-playing games, players start at the bottom of the ladder and make their way to the top by earning experience points. The game focuses on crimes and player versus player combat as a way of earning EXP or experience points. However, the EXP system is different from other games, as it does not show how much EXP is left for the next level. Players can purchase in-game benefits in exchange for payments, which are termed "donator packs". The Torn beta ended on 15 November 2004, with over a million users by 2008.

=== 2014 ===
A major overhaul of the Torn engine was completed in 2014, with Torn 'RESPO' released on June 23 of that year.

=== 2018 ===
In 2018 Torn was made available as an Android App.

== Crimes 2.0 ==
Torn has received many new items in updates, the most noticeable and anticipated being the Crimes 2.0 update, which was announced in 2014 and was implemented on June 20, 2023 after nine years of development in an effort to revamp the old system, which has been in place since 2004. The new update added new aspects to crimes; they are affected by Torn's in-game time, affecting the chance of receiving rare items and chances of success in these crimes. Success in some of these new crimes is not only reliant on the time of day, however; it can also be reliant on what day of the week it is, or how many people are online at the time.

As is, Crimes 2.0 employs more in-depth criminal acts, requiring actual unique items and specific education courses, in the case of one specific crime, but usually grants more exciting benefits as a result, and therefore rewards more dedicated players.
