= Pirate Galaxy =

2009 video game

- Developer: Splitscreen Studios
- Publisher: Splitscreen Studios
- Producers: Gustaf Stechmann, Alexandre Maia
- Designers: Gustaf Stechmann, Jonathan Lindsay, Alexander Walter
- Programmers: Mark Buchholz, Ole Schaper, Alexandre Maia, Lars Campe, Joana Grade, Jannik Staub, Jan Schwien, Alexander Grunert
- Artists: Alexandre Maia, Boris Patschull, Jan Sonnwald, Jan Weyers, Friederike Engels, Jochen Geisler
- Platform: Windows
- Release: April 29, 2009
- Genre: MMORPG

Pirate Galaxy is a free-to-play, massive multiplayer online game written in Java. Players can operate spaceships, explore a collection of planets, mine minerals, and fight other players and enemies in the planetary combat. The game features 3D graphics and runs from a downloadable client.

== Story ==
The game's story revolves around an organization called The Mantis who have conquered many star systems, leaving only a few pilots to recruit others to fight back.

Players take on the role of a smuggler on the planet Kalabesh in the Vega system. As the player progresses through the game, they travel to various planets, and eventually join The Colonials, who were previously their enemies. After a battle with the Mantis mothership, the player gains access to the Antares star system, where they meet the Admiral and help him find his daughter.

Later, the player travels to the Gemini system and meets Isaac, Sara, and the survivors of the war with The Mantis. They then move on to the Mizar system, where they encounter the Baum Arian Fighters, and eventually reach their own star system, Sol, which is now controlled by the Imperials. After a boss battle with Lord Fam Doom, the player gains entrance to the Draconis system, where they meet the Methanoids and defeat the Mantis Queen to complete the ancient artifact.

The game's final system, the Sirius Singularity, is accessed through a wormhole that opens after the player experiments with the artifact. This new system is rich with wealth and is inhabited by both the Mantis and rogue Methanoid criminals, as well as a race called "The Ancients". The latest system, Tau Ceti, has recently been completed with the fourth and final part being released.

== Gameplay ==
Throughout the game, the player explores star systems and planets, upgrades their ship, and completes missions to progress through the story.

Beginning on planet Kalabash in the Vega System, there are eight star systems and over 30 planets to explore. The star systems are Vega, Antares, Gemini, Mizar, Sol, Draconis, Sirius Singularity, and Tau Ceti. These systems are named in reference to the stars of the Milky Way.

The Sirius Singularity is a system which needs lot of teamwork in which clan allies have a role to play. The Sirius Singularity has 5 Rings. Rings 1–4 are resource planets, and Ring 5 is an ancient planet from which players get ancient items of other systems. In Sirius Singularity, a jump ship plays a major role to jump to planet by accomplishing missions on 1–4 ring planets and mission not needed to be done to jump from the Ring 5, The player has to jump out of the planet to different ones before the planet collapses and it will be displayed on the planet profile. The planet will collapse, and new ones will be automatically made but the names are random.

== Reception ==
The game generally received favorable reviews.

== Awards ==
The game received an award at Deutscher Entwicklerpreis 2009 for technical innovation and was nominated at Deutscher Computerspielpreis for best browser-based game of the year.
