= Nerdle =

2022 web-based number game

- Developers: Richard Mann, Marcus Tettmar
- Publisher: Richard Mann
- Platforms: Browser, mobile
- Release: January 2022
- Genre: Puzzle

Nerdle is a web-based number game created and developed by London-based data scientist Richard Mann together with his children and software developer Marcus Tettmar. Players have six attempts to guess an eight-digit/symbol calculation, with feedback given for each guess in the form of colored tiles indicating when the chosen numbers or math symbols match or occupy the correct position. The game was inspired by the popular web-based Wordle and the founders' love of math. Nerdle has a single daily solution, with all players attempting to guess the same calculation.

== Gameplay ==
Players have to guess an equation. Green tiles are correct, purple tiles are in the equation but in the wrong spot. Gray tiles are not in the equation. Players have six tries to guess. The equation is new everyday.
