= Planetarion =

Browser-based massively multiplayer online game

- Developer(s): Fifth Season A.S.
- Publisher(s): Jagex
- Platform(s): Any Internet Browser
- Release: 2000
- Genre(s): MMOG, Tick-based game
- Mode(s): Single-player

Planetarion is a browser-based massively multiplayer online game. Created by Fifth Season AS in early 2000, bought by Jolt in 2003, and purchased by Renegade Games in 2009; it is owned by Jagex. The game places players in control of a planet, with the ability to mine its asteroids for resources, enabling them to construct a fleet of spaceships to attack other players' planets. Although its popularity has declined with the emergence of other similar games and the introduction of a pay-to-play model, which has since been changed to a freemium format, the game is active, and as such is one of the oldest running internet games of its genre.

== Gameplay ==
The objective of the game is to attain a higher score than the other players, which can be achieved primarily by stealing their asteroids and destroying their fleets. The game offers a player the choice between five races, each with their own types ships and advantages, allowing for a variety of strategies. Every few months, the game is reset, at which point winners are declared and a new round of play starts, commonly with a number of new features and updates to keep the gameplay balanced.

The game updates once per hour, which is called a tick in-game. Every action within the game, from the construction of a factory to the attack of another planet, takes a set number of these ticks which gives the game a unique mix between turn-based and real-time gameplay, as it allows players only a limited window of time to react to other players's actions. Because of this, cooperation and communication between planets is a necessity, which leads to a strong sense of community play as the players organise themselves into alliances. Alliances use a variety of communications platforms, including IRC, Discord and Telegram.

The game takes place in rounds, the length of which have varied throughout the game's history, but which currently last for about two months. After which the winners are declared, followed by Havoc period where all the planets are given a massive amount of resources, constructions, and tech, and then the game is reset upon which everyone can sign up for a brand new planet.

New rounds generally also bring changes in gameplay, ship statistics or even universe makeup, as a result of feedback from the players during the active round.

In between rounds, speedgames are frequently held over weekends which generally run at one-minute ticks, instead of hourly ones for more fast-paced action. In the past, these speedgames have been run at LAN events such as The Gathering in Norway and the Multiplay i-Series in the United Kingdom, and have also been used for competitions such as the Planetarion World Cup.

== Development ==
Whilst originally free, the crash of the dotcom bubble also meant a decline in advertising revenue for Fifth Season AS, the Norwegian company behind Planetarion. As a result, the move was made to a pay-to-play model with the start of Round 5. This led to a sharp decline in the game's userbase.

In 2003, Planetarion was sold by Fifth Season AS to the UK-based company SimTech Ltd., a daughter company of Jolt, who provided hosting for the game.

In 2007, round 22 ("Shards of Infinity") once again was a free round. A notable feature is that inactive players will automatically be moved to an inactive part of the universe.

On 16 January 2009, it was announced that OMAC, the company that bought Jolt, had decided to discontinue Planetarion after round 30.

On 6 February 2009, Peter Zaborszky from Renegade Games Limited confirmed that they had purchased the rights to Planetarion and that they would continue to run the game.

On 26 July 2010, it was confirmed that Jagex had purchased Planetarion.

In August 2013, Jagex allowed a newly formed company called Ranul Tech Ltd the licence to operate and manage the game, whilst still maintaining ownership.

In July 2021, in reaction to the impending shutdown of the Netgamers IRC network, Planetarion migrated to Discord for its official communications.

== Reception ==
PC Zone reviewed version 2 of Planetarion in October 2000, at which point, there were over 30,000 players. PC Zone described the gameplay as having a "charm and subtle addiction that is a pleasant change of pace" and highlighted the quality of support available for the game via volunteer staffed IRC channels. The game was awarded a score of 72%.

Michael Dougherty reviewed Planetarion on 28 August 2007 and awarded a score of 7.0/10, stating that "if you sit in front of your PC twitching uncontrollably when you do not kill a PC/NPC or blow something up on a regular basis then this is definitely not the game for you. However, if you are a strategist who enjoys a slow-paced, turn-based game then you will not find anything better than Planetarion. The keys to this game are strategy and patience, couple this with the proper player base and the right frame of mind when entering the game and you just might find yourself pleasantly surprised and extremely addicted."

=== Awards and accomplishments ===
When the game was launched in 2000 it achieved popularity, receiving eleven Multiplayer Online Games Directory Game of the Month Awards. Planetarion has won the MPOGD game of the month award 13 times, most recently in January 2012.
