= Command & Conquer: Tiberium Alliances =

2012 video game

- Developer: EA Phenomic
- Publisher: Electronic Arts
- Series: Command & Conquer
- Platforms: Web browser (supported Internet Explorer 9, Firefox 4.1+, Google Chrome)
- Release: May 24, 2012
- Genre: Massively multiplayer online real-time strategy
- Mode: Multiplayer

Command & Conquer: Tiberium Alliances is a military science fiction massively multiplayer online real-time strategy video game developed by Electronic Arts Phenomic and published by Electronic Arts as a free-to-play online-only browser game. The game entered its closed beta stage in December 2011. The game entered its open beta stage on March 15, 2012 and its official release was on May 24, requiring an Origin account to play.

== Gameplay ==
Tiberium Alliances is a massively multiplayer online real-time strategy video game. The player will first select a sector on the world map and start their first base there. The base will be protected from attacks for one week, but will go unprotected if the owner attacks another player prior to the time ending. From there the player can advance their base further through construction, gathering, or combat. There are several resources used in the game. They are Tiberium, crystal, power, credit, and research points. Tiberium is used for base construction. Crystal is used to produce infantry, tanks and aircraft and upgrade manned defense units. Power is used for both base construction and military unit upgrades. Credit is for transferring Tiberium and crystals between bases. It is also used along with research points to research new units and structures for base advancement, and also for new MCVs, which are deployed to create new bases.

Each player on each server must select a permanent faction to join. The GDI faction has traditional military ranks, while the Nod faction are religious extremists, each with a religious title. The two factions have different offensive and defensive unit types.

The player usually starts off battling against camps of The Forgotten, then moves on to battling the Forgotten outposts and bases as well as other player bases. Through battles, the player can win resources from other bases or lose resources if attacked by another player. If a player loses their base, they can re-materialize the base on another nearby location, with time and resource penalties. Bases can be moved to new locations without being destroyed first.

Any player can create an alliance and invite people to it. An alliance must have at least one Commander-in-Chief (CiC), and can also have any number of Second-in-Commands (SiCs), officers, veterans, members, inactives, and trial players, so long as the total is 50 players or less. Despite the name difference, CiCs and SiCs have equal powers, including the ability to disband the alliance. They can also grant rights based on rank to the remaining players. Officers and above also have a private chat area only they can see, while there's a general chat area for the entire alliance, and a "whisper" mode that allows anyone to have a private chat with anyone else, even in another alliance. In addition, there is a message system within the game.

== Plagiarism accusation ==
Accusations were raised against EA that the designs of two pre-release in-game units were copies of the Ork Bonecruncha and Baneblade tank from the Warhammer 40,000 franchise. EA later confirmed that the units in question don't appear in the game official release.

== DICE ==
On the closure of Phenomic by the end of October 2013 DICE took over the development.

== Envision Entertainment ==
On April 7, 2015, Envision Entertainment took over the development of the game.
