= Cursor*10 =

2008 video game

- Title screen
- Developer: Nekogames
- Publisher: Nekogames
- Designer: Yoshio Ishii
- Platforms: Web Browser; Adobe Flash
- Release: WW: 2008
- Genre: Browser game
- Mode: Single-player

Cursor*10 (pronounced "cursor times ten") is a web-based browser game developed by the Japanese company Nekogames and designed by Yoshio Ishii. The game is Flash-based.

== Development ==
The game was inspired by the Flash-based browser game Finger Tracks made by Yugo Nakamura. It was developed by Yoshio Ishii over a single Japanese New Year's Holiday.

== Gameplay ==
The player must guide a cursor through a series of obstacles. Previous attempts are replayed as the player re-attempts each level and in some cases the player must attempt the level more than once with the assistance of their previous attempt. This means that the player is assisted by and interacts with the "ghost" of their previous self in their previous attempt. The game is thus a "one player co-op" game.

An example of a task where the player must attempt the level more than once is a level where the player must click on a box 99 times within a specific time where the time is short enough to make the task impossible in a single attempt. Another example is a level where the player has to click on a plate to disclose a staircase where the plate is located so as to make the staircase unreachable from the plate.

== Reception ==
The game has been praised for its novel design. It was included in the book 1001 Video Games You Must Play Before You Die, though the book described it as "more a proof of concept than the finished work". Writing for Rock Paper Shotgun, John Walker praised the game's one-player co-op design, calling it "The best possible form of co-op". Writing for the Austin Chronicle, James Renovitch described the game as "A focus on innovative play and a unique artistic style".

The game has been credited with popularising the "self-co-op" style of gameplay. A sequel called Cursor*10 2nd Session was subsequently released.

A greatly updated version of the game ported over to PlayStation Portable platform called (in Japanese) Onore no Shinzuru Michi wo Yuke developed by Silicon Studio was released in Japan by publishers From Software.
