= Space Heroes Universe! =

Flash-based online game for children

- Developer: Bubble Gum Interactive
- Publisher: Bubble Gum Interactive
- Engine: Adobe Flash
- Platform: Online
- Genre: Virtual World

Space Heroes Universe!, formerly known as Little Space Heroes, is a discontinued online game for children developed by Bubble Gum Interactive in Australia. The game was playable for free under a freemium model. It was set in a Sci-Fi / Space setting in which players make their own hero and explore the galaxy.

In addition to the virtual world, a mobile game entitled Jetpack Jinx was launched. The virtual started to decline in 2014 to the point that it is no longer playable in January 2015 .

== Story ==
In the game, players create a Space Hero and joins the Space Heroes Academy. They complete basic training and learn how to use their Bubble Blasters, Jetpack and Starjet. The villain of the game is Lord Shadowbot, a dastardly robot with a fear of the dark. On arriving in the Heroes galaxy twenty years earlier, he stole away the Glows, a mysterious race of creatures known to give off huge amounts of light and energy. Players must search the galaxy for clues left behind and seek out the missing Glows.

The game is non-linear but does feature quests and missions. Players can earn badges and receive awards for completing various tasks and quests. A major aspect of the game is social play whereby players can interact in social environments or team-based play.

== Gameplay ==
The game was playable within a browser using the mouse and keyboard. Most moves and control is point-and-click although there are some special keyboard commands.

== Membership ==
The basic game was free to play with nearly 2 million players as of early 2013. Players were able to subscribe to extra features on the site by becoming a member, and paying a membership fee. Space Heroes Universe premium members were able to explore the full game, make more friends, personalize their avatar and its homepad, collect virtual pet Kritterz, unlock special achievements and get VIP access.

== Accolades ==
Space Heroes Universe! has won a number of awards and recognitions from gaming and parenting websites. It was positively reviewed by games website MMGN, and was featured in an episode of the TV show ABC Good Game: Spawn Point.

In November 2011, it received the Seal of Approval from FamilyFriendlyVideoGames.com

== Merchandise ==
In late 2013, Space Heroes Universe merchandise was announced, starting with a trading card game with plush toys, stationery and showbags noted or 2014
