= Star Wars Combine =

1998 video game

- Homepage
- Developer: SWC Programming Team
- Publisher: SWC Programming Team
- Platform: Web browser
- Release: December 3, 1998
- Genre: MMORPG
- Mode: Multiplayer

Star Wars Combine (SWC) is a real-time massively multiplayer online browser game, set in the Star Wars universe and with a persistent world. It is not licensed by LucasArts, but is permitted to use the setting. It was ranked 88th in the Top 100 games of All-Time by PC Gamer in its March 2012 issue. It is a means to facilitate the meeting of the international community of players via the forums and IRC channels.

== Origins ==
Star Wars Combine was released in December 1998 as a continuation of a game maintained between the mid-1990s and summer 1998 called Star Wars Simulation. The Sim Master (a term based on Game Master) disappeared and the servers were shut down soon after. Some players of that stranded community decided to create their own version of the game, which then evolved.

== Gameplay ==
Gameplay in Star Wars Combine. Here the player navigates their hyperspace route.

In order to help the players of the game, commonly described as daunting, help, suggestions, and tips from more experienced players are often required to perform some of the basic actions available to a player.

According to François Deliège: "SWC is not only a MMORPG, it also offers the best Star Wars universe simulation fans may ever dream of." Star Wars Combine has its own various game mechanisms related to the physics, economy, politics and engineering in the universe. It requires both logic and socialization skills from the players. All those mechanisms are defined by game rules that are debated between players, written by the game administrator and made available to the whole Star Wars Combine community. Whilst performing rather common tasks (many of which could take hours, days or even weeks depending on complexity and type) players interact in their forums and chat rooms, planning the next operation, role-playing their character, trading in the open market or in the black market and organizing events. As Josh Augustine states in his article, "The amount of free spontaneous creativity within this game is mind-numbing, dwarfing even the machinations behind EVE Online." The game dynamics allow players to be what they want it to be. Players can roleplay, be in character all the time or not at all. Some players are heavily into roleplay and hardly do any in-game participation, while others focus on in-game actions only.

In-game actions take time, and the character's creation is more complex than in other similar simulations. Some veterans have been playing since the game's creation. The purpose of the slower, real-time pace is devised in order to allow players, in various time zones, to have the time to respond to events happening around while not always online. The player's character is present in the game regardless of the player's presence. Therefore, results such as being killed are possible, and unlike in other simulations a character's death is often permanent. Players can create a new character after a short waiting period and begin again, minus all prior possessions and positions. In an interview by Joystiq's Massively in 2008, a number of in-game features were discussed, along with any possible issues the administration had encountered.

== Development ==
Since its creation in 1998, the simulation has seen a number of upgrades and differing rates of development by volunteers. Moving from a standalone program with web-based community space to a full browser-based online game over the years, there has also been difficulty due to inexperience with other coding languages, lack of funds or any number of other reasons. In recent years, features such as the ability to produce ships, vehicles and gear in factories, basic Player vs Creature (P.v.C) Combat and a canonized Galactic Map have been implemented, leading to better overall gameplay. Reportedly it was one of the first MMORPGs which implemented a web service solution to its architecture in 2005.

== Academic use ==
The simulation has been the subject of several academic studies, ranging from English literacy and related improvements in a role-playing environment to psychological studies on what are called "Internet communities", that is groups of people who connect and interact online around shared interests, goals, or experiences. Two academic theses were also based on this game. These were also presented at the Second International Conference on Web Information Systems and Technologies. Star Wars Combine has also been cited in two papers from the International Game Developers Association for its programming choices and security measures.
