= Terra Est Quaestuosa =

1998 video game

- Developer(s): Niels Schoot, Bastiaan Berendsen
- Platform(s): World Wide Web
- Release: 1998
- Genre(s): MMOG
- Mode(s): Multi-player

Terra Est Quaestuosa (or TEQ) is a web-based massively multiplayer online game (MMOG) that has been operating since 1998 and has been played by tens of thousands of people. It is an online strategy game in which players must create, manage and expand a country through war and trade.

Together with Earth 2025 it was the first that made the step from Bulletin board system-based "multiplayer" games to the World Wide Web, starting a new genre of games. Both games are based on the bulletin board game Barren Realms Elite. The game was founded 1998 by Niels Schoot and Bastiaan Berendsen, and is still being actively developed. Although the game was publicly available in 1998 it was called a "BETA" until March 2000

TEQ reached its peak popularity in 2000 during the ".com bubble." The media (hungry for internet-related news) caught attention of the relatively new concept of massive online gaming. Many Dutch newspapers and magazines wrote stories about the game and concept. As a result of this, many players joined the game, making it even more popular. TEQ is less popular today, but hundreds of players still log in every day and TEQ remains the top-rating game on Multiplayer Online Games Directory.

== Game Play ==
Players create countries in their server of choice and begin with a base number of territories with which to develop their newly founded country. They are also supplied a starting amount of Euro's to pay for development of your country, building components with which to build on your territories, bread with which to feed your population and a small military force. Players are then given a period of protection (based on their server of choice) which grants them immunity from attack so they may build up their country and defences. The game is a turn based structure and at the start of every play period (referred to as set or reset) you begin with 0 turns and accumulate 1 turn every 15 or 25 minutes (based on server being played) until you have reached the maximum number of stored turns associated with that server. Turns are used by building, researching new technologies, attacking or by working overtime. Each set lasts a period of one month and the player with the highest net worth is declared the winner.

=== Growth ===
Players expand and grow by gaining new territories, these can either be bought or taken by force. They can then be assigned to varying different buildings, from military production types (barracks and war factories), production buildings (bakeries, steel factories, research facilities and cement factories), missile defence installations and money generating buildings (beaches, solar panels, tax offices and condominiums). These buildings will determine what sort of economy the player has, whether they are generating cash to purchase units and resources or producing units to sell for resources, or producing resources to sell for units.

=== Military ===
There are seven different military units available. Marines, Fighters, Bombers and Panzers, which are used for attacking, Heavy Lasers which are used in conjunction with the attacking units for defence, Missiles and SEALs, which are used for covert operations. In addition to the regular attacks, each attacking unit is capable of a specialised attack which targets a specific defensive unit to capture or destroy a specific resource.

== Servers ==
There are currently 4 different servers and game modes to play in. Team server, Group server, Tournament server, and the Express server. Each is defined by different conditions and rules.

=== Team Server ===
Team as it suggests, allows for players to "team up" and compete as a team of up to 10 players. Protection is for the first 150 turns played and there is a maximum of 150 turns allowed to be stored. Turns are replenished every 20 minutes. The individual winning criterion is based on highest net worth. Team server is the traditional game mode for TEQ.

=== Group Server ===
Group server is designed for small groups of three players. Protection lasts for the first 200 turns with 200 turns the maximum storable number of turns and turns accumulated every 15 minutes. In Group server, there are no missile attacks. This means that the buildings and technology associated with sending and defending against missiles are also removed. The winning criterion is based on your group's performance: half your net worth plus half your group's total net worth divided by 3.

=== Tournament Server ===
Tournament server is an all out free for all server. Teaming up or forming alliances with other players is strictly prohibited. Protection is for the first 250 turns and a maximum 250 turns can be stored, with turns replenished every 15 minutes. The server is split into 3 different levels, with a player being placed in levels depending on the finish of the previous set. This is designed to have the better players in level 1 with the new players learning their way in the lower levels. The winner is the player in level 1 with the highest net worth.

=== Express Server ===
Express server was introduced to TEQ in 2010 as the "Quickstart server." It was designed as a starting point for newer players, and as a server for veteran players to practice different strategies. The server allows the player to choose a strategy, and have their country set up accordingly as if they had played 100 in game turns towards building that type of country. Global points are not awarded for this server, however, so competition and aggressive play are generally lower. This functions to keep newer players safe while they learn the basics of the game.

== Global Rankings ==
Players are awarded global rankings based on their performances in each set of each server. These points are used to determine an overall ranking within the game.

== Trivia ==
Initially the game was called Terra Est Quaestuosus, which is incorrect in Latin, since Terra is female. The name was changed to Quaestuosa after receiving criticism when the website's name was publicised in the media in 2000.
