= Omerta (video game) =

2003 video game

- Website type: Browser game, MMORPG
- Available in: English, Dutch, Portuguese, Turkish
- Website: https://www.barafranca.com
- Commercial: Yes
- Registration: Required
- Launched: 26 September 2003
- Current status: Active

Omerta is a browser-based text MMORPG that launched in 2003. The player takes control of an American gangster in the 1930s, who must work their way up the ranks of organized crime by stealing cars, committing crimes, breaking people out of prison, and dealing alcohol and narcotics.

== Development ==
Omerta was launched publicly on 26 September 2003 with the first version, now known as Omerta 1.0. This version was written by Moritz Daan in Groningen. During the 16-year run of Omerta, there have been about 38 million player registrations. In January 2008, Omerta moved to a new service provider with 20 servers running the FreeBSD operating system.

In July 2009 version 3.0 of Omerta was released. In the first month after the release more than 100,000 players registered.

Following several intermediate versions, in February 2013 version 4.0 was released with enhanced game-play and a modern graphical style replaced the original frame-based standard web layout.

Version 5.0 has been the current build since 2015.

== Gameplay ==
Omerta is a strategic massively multiplayer online role playing game where players undertake criminal activities to earn money and experience. Each player establishes their own Mafia family, which must compete with other families in a constant struggle for dominance. An important feature in Omerta is the ability to permanently kill the families (and the accounts) of other players, which not only enables successful players to earn more money but also reduces in-game competition. The player's ultimate goal is to become the don of a high-earning Mafia family. Team play and cooperation are essential, and during Omerta's lifespan, many durable alliances have come into existence between families.

Set in the 1930s, a time of rampant corruption and lawlessness, Omerta is built around the attainment of status, money, and respect. Players earn points and increase their rank by committing crimes, stealing cars, and busting friends out of jail. More experienced players can also set up organized crime rings, which engage in more profitable crimes such as bank robberies, holdups, and hijackings. Once their family has risen to a certain level of power and stability, the player can expand into illegal rackets such as managing gambling clubs, reselling booze, and even drug dealing. These illicit businesses steadily produce profit and increase the family's overall standing in the criminal underworld.

When setting up their account, the player can choose to either start in a city of the United States or Italy, where the Mafia has deep and lasting roots. Another possible location is Las Vegas, where players can try their luck in mob-run casinos which offer a wide range of slot machines, black-jack games, and even roulette tables.

In a deadly and sometimes cruel world, the player must form partnerships and build alliances, both for protection and shared wealth. Forming an alliance with another family allows players to look out for each other and defend their territories more efficiently. Families are rich, powerful, and can run whole neighborhoods of a city, and while it's usually better to have them as friends, a player's family won't get far if they have to share their power with too many competitors. Families are extremely paranoid and suspicious of each other, and if the player attacks their members, tries to take over their rackets, or infringes on their territory, they will be more than happy to go to war. Players have a number of options to protect themselves from rival families: they can hire bodyguards, purchase getaway cars for a quick escape if attacked, and even wear special "bulletproof" suits.

== Business model ==
Omerta is a pioneer of free-to-play games; it does not carry banners or other advertisements and there are no exclusively-paid functions which would give paying-players advantages over those who cannot. From launch Omerta operated a 'click-limit' whereby players paying can view more pages of the game each minute.

Players would request a maximum of eleven webpages per minute, or purchase an unlock-code which raised the click-limit to 40 webpages per minute. A second code might be activated, allowing more message-storage in a player's inbox, a more feature-rich profile page and various other soft, non-advantageous perks. Codes can be purchased via phone and web-based micro-payments, including via PayPal or by using the game's own internal auction tool.

In 2015 this early-web device was retired in favour of a premium content based system wherein players are able to part-automate play while offline, however, the model remains free-to-play owing to the ability to purchase content unlock codes via an in-game market feature called 'oBay'.

== IP licensing deal with Kalypso Media ==
In the summer of 2012, a licensing partnership was agreed with Germany-based game developer Kalypso Media, in order for Kalypso to use Omerta's IP for the PC game Omerta – City of Gangsters. The PC game features a link to Omerta (the web-game) on its index page and on the games's promotional web site. A special flier from Omerta was carried in the box-edition of Omerta – City of Gangsters.
