= Samurai Taisen =

Indonesian action game

- Developer: PST Team
- Publisher: PST Team
- Engine: PHP
- Platform: Web Browser
- Release: May 6, 2013
- Genres: MMORTS, Visual novel
- Mode: Multi player

Samurai Taisen (侍大戦; lit. Samurai Great Wars) is an online MMORTS developed and published by PST Team, a small indie developer team based in Surabaya, Indonesia. Samurai Taisen has undergone one pre-testing at December 7, 2012. The game was released on May 6, 2013 as a web browser game and was described by the development team as a combination of both MMORTS and Visual novel aspects to a game.

== Gameplay ==
Samurai Taisen is set in an alternate universe of the warring states period in Japan where players assume their role as Ji-samurai. Each player starts the game as leader of a small, undeveloped village that they must develop to expand their lands. They develop the village by constructing new buildings and upgrading existing ones. To defend their villages, players may also recruit troops both to defend and to attack other villages. The player may expand their lands by establishing new villages, or by conquering other players' villages. Players can communicate with each other using in-game messages, and may join alliances for military and economic co-operation with other players.

=== Resources ===
The game features two main resources: Rice and Coins, which players need to develop villages, conduct researches, and raise troops. To obtain these resources, players must build mine and farmland. They can increase resource output by upgrading mines and farmland. Players can also get more resources by establishing new villages or raiding other villages.

=== Troops ===
To defend their villages, players must train troops. Each troop has attributes that determine training time, attack power, defense power, speed, and resource carrying capacity. There are two main troop types: combat and special. Combat troops have combat capabilities to defend, attack, or raid villages. Special troops such as ninja, geisha, and komusō have special capabilities they use to spy on enemy villages, or to perform assassinations. Troops can be trained at dojo.

There is also a special unit known as a Taishō (大将, "boss" or "chief"), which represents the players in game. Taishō can equip items and explore dungeon. They can also accompany an army. Depending on their attributes, a hero may give an offensive or defensive bonus to the army that it accompanies.

=== Factions ===
In Samurai Taisen there are four major forces: Date clan, Uesugi clan, Takeda clan, Oda clan. Each of them has their own characteristics and strategical bonus. The amount of strategical bonus depends on the current provinces that faction holds. Players may choose to join one or not to join to stay independent as Ronin. Factions provide players with daily quests, completing quests will increase the standings towards that faction. Raising standing in a faction allows the player to access more valuable and harder quests.

=== Alliances ===
Players with embassy may form their own alliances. Player use an alliance to work together for mutual benefit, and provide improved communication tools—such as mass alliance-wide in-game messages and an alliance private forum. Members of an alliance may not attack each other, and each is notified if their allies are under attack.
