= Sentou Gakuen =

Indonesian action games

- Developer: PST Team
- Publisher: PST Team
- Engine: PHP
- Platform: Web Browser
- Release: January 1, 2012
- Genres: Visual novel, MMORPG
- Mode: Multi player

Sentou Gakuen (戦闘学園; lit. Combat School) was an online visual novel developed and published by PST Team, a small indie developer based in Indonesia. Sentou Gakuen has undergone two pre-testings: October 16 and 24, 2011 and an Open Beta on December 29, 2011. The game was released on January 1, 2012 as a web browser game and was described by the development team as the first to combine both Visual novel and MMORPG aspects to a game. Due to abandonment by both the lead developer (disappeared without a word) and a second "developer" allegedly "running off with the funds for the Steam game version", the game is considered closed.

== Gameplay ==
The gameplay of Sentou Gakuen, is made up of text dialogues. The text displayed on the screen depicts conversations between different characters and/or the thoughts of those characters. The "Story Mode" of the game is illustrated in a Visual Novel style. As an option, players are allowed to opt out of the dialogue between characters. Once the story is finished, players may continue the game, thus leaving it open ended.

Just like other MMORPG-type games, each character has their own statistics. To increase their statistics, players must take lessons and attend classes; if the player wishes to increase their strength, they attend physical education classes. Other statistics such as energy are required for training. Willpower determines the efficiency of player actions. Action points are used to perform actions. Experience represents the progress required till the player-character levels up. Health is a finite value used to determine how much damage, usually in terms of physical injury, the player can withstand.

In Sentou Gakuen, the players can equip themselves with various weapons, such as a pencil or a ruler. For extra money, a player can take a part-time job.

=== Club ===
Students who share a similar goal, vision, or interest are allowed to form their own club. Clubs are organizations formed by the students themselves, each with its own facilities, president, and vice president. Clubs also have the ability to organize club activities, which require participation from their members. Joining a club is an important task in order to survive on Sentou Gakuen.

=== Dating System ===
It is possible to have a relationship with another student. Being in a relationship will bring players to a new menu located in the Personal Area, called the Couples menu, where there will be special actions that can be done once per day. In order to be a couple with another student, players need to put a Love Letter into the target's Shoe Locker Box. If the target accepts the confession, they become a couple. If the target rejects the confession, nothing happens.

On Sentou Gakuen there are certain NPCs who the player may date. In order to do this, players need to win their Affection Points. Each NPC has a different way to earn the points; some examples are: maxing out certain statistics, giving presents, etc. There are hints on Story Mode about how to earn Affection Points for each NPC. Every week, NPCs will re-select from the Sentou Gakuen database of players and sort based on their Affection Points. NPCs will then write a love letter to the players that have the highest Affection Points for them. However, it is up to the players whether to accept their confessions or not. If the target player accepts, they will both be in a relationship. If the player rejects, the NPCs will stay single for the week and re-select again from the database the following week. Thus, maintaining a relationship with a NPC is hard and would need a lot of effort to keep the Affection Points high.

== Story ==
Sentou Gakuen primarily takes place in a fictional school called Sentou High School, which is located in Tokyo. Physical locales of Tokyo such as Shibuya Scramble Crossing, and Wako Shop at Ginza can be spotted in the game. When the story begins, the player assumes the role of a new freshman student at Sentou High School where they will meet new friends and several of their childhood friends as their journey begins.

== Characters ==
- Kiyomizu Ichirou (清水 一郎)

Ichirou is a bespectacled male student with a very keen interest in all things 2-dimensional. He makes his infatuation in female anime characters clear to others around him, and does not mind being a social outcast for his preferences. He enjoys exploring the unknown even though he knows it will get him into various mishaps.

- Kojima Takayuki (小島 隆行)

Takayuki has the appearance of an ordinary student; gets average grades in school and does not stand out amongst his peers. Being a typical generic student would be true for him, but the fact that he is a gifted cook and secretly acts as Sentou Gakuen's head cafeteria chef on occasion, voids such a label.

- Takeuchi Iwao (竹内 巌)

Iwao is a pretty-boy who often attracts the attention of many girls alike, that is, until he decides to open his mouth. He is fairly conceited and believes good things will come to him without him having to do doing anything, which often causes disgust by other people. He has very high goals but wants to reach them as easily as possible, with little to no effort on his part.

- Matsumoto Fumiko (松本 文子)

Fumiko, the first-year-class representative, is a girl who follows the straight and narrow path. Although she does not show this attribute on the outside, she cares for the well-being of other students. Many people underestimate her athletic ability because of her work ethic in school, which makes her seem like a person whose only interest is studying. However, in hostile situations, she will fully display her expertise in martial arts. She is serious about maintaining stability in Sentou Gakuen and seeks to rid the school of all possible misdemeanors.

- Sasaki Yukiko (佐々木 由希子)

Yukiko is a typical schoolgirl; she is loud, talkative and speaks her mind just because she feels it is what people should always do, as a natural extrovert. Working in various odd-jobs and having conversations with people abroad had turned her into a very sociable person. She always believes enough is never enough and in working as hard as one should to secure a decent future.

- Fujita Eiko (藤田 栄子)
- Kiyomizu Miharu(清水 美春)
- RA Widya Wulandari
