= Blood Wars (video game) =

2006 video game

- Developer(s): BW Team
- Engine: PHP
- Platform(s): Web browser
- Release: 2006
- Genre(s): MMORPG text-based

Blood Wars is a free Polish MMORPG in which players play as vampires in a post nuclear world and have to fight for dominance in the only city that survived the apocalypse.

Blood Wars has been released on January 8, 2006 and is developed and maintained by BW Team. Current language versions available are English, French, Polish, Russian and Turkish. There are 16 playable realms with over 200,000 accounts total.
