= SmallWorlds =

- Developer: Outsmart Games
- Release: 2008
- Genres: Adventure, RPG
- Mode: Multiplayer

SmallWorlds was an online virtual world and social network service created by Outsmart Games, a game development company based in Auckland, New Zealand. The virtual world used Adobe Flash and ran inside a web browser, as Google Chrome was most recommended when playing this game. It integrated with YouTube, Flickr, SoundCloud, and a number of other Web 2.0 services. The game had thousands of players, peaking in 2012 with a total of 3.8 million visits globally from July to August.

It was announced in March 2018 that the game would be shut down due to shrinking player numbers and financial struggles. It closed on 8 April 2018. A message on the SmallWorlds website stated that the company was in talks and hoped to resume service soon. As of December 2019, there is a new message on the SmallWorlds website indicating that developers are working on a new project called TownCenter. It also says that it will be "founded on similar principles, content, and offers new life for those who called SmallWorlds 'home'.".

== Awards ==
In October 2009, SmallWorlds was voted top prize in the Social Computing category of the Adobe MAX Awards 2009.

== Users ==
SmallWorlds was free to play and join, with a requirement to be at least 13 years of age. It was designed to be teenage friendly, being more casual and less provocative than Second Life. This game brought teenagers and people from all over the world, in terms of playing with people from different areas in life.

SmallWorlds also had a VIP option with extended game options for players at a monthly, three monthly, half yearly, or yearly cost. This gave users extra game options such as further character customization, clothing and wearable options, and other special perks not available to free users. VIP could be purchased with real currencies used around the world or with virtual currency (SmallWorld's Gold) that was earned in the game and via offers through the game.

According to co-founder Mitch Olson, SmallWorlds' demographic base as of 2012 consisted of about 65% female players, predominantly teens, followed by 'soccer mums'.

== Partnerships and integration with social media ==
In February 2009, SmallWorlds launched embeddable versions of its application that integrate with Facebook, MySpace, Hi5 and Bebo.

With SmallWorlds, users could share their experiences together watching YouTube videos, listening to music on SoundCloud together and by browsing through photo galleries. SmallWorlds brought together all aspects of social media, online games, instant messaging and digital media into one bundle.

== In education ==
SmallWorlds was one of the tools for learning used for learning used in the development of the New Zealand Virtual School project. The project was scheduled to open in 2011, but with offices in central Christchurch, the Christchurch earthquake saw several changes that led to the termination of the project.

== Levelling ==
Players in SmallWorlds had seven skill paths: arena, artist, crafting, explorer, farming, gamer and social, each with their own level. A player could level up by playing missions, doing PVP shooting games, sowing plants or crafting up items. There were many different widgets, but only one or two that worked at any given time

== Business Model ==
SmallWorlds was based on the freemium model of sales, where one may play the game free, but can pay for extras, such as VIP membership, granting them access to various places around the site, and have the ability to buy items other players do not have access to, as well as gold, the main virtual currency of the game.

== Updates ==
SmallWorlds entered Beta in June 2008 after 18 months in development, and was released on 1 December 2008. Several software updates have been released since that time. SmallWorlds launched version 1.0 in 1 December 2008. This involved performance enhancement, retexturing, and other various technical changes.

The site later on had seen a major update as of 5 April 2013. The new update includes a brand new layout for both the site and the forums. Also, there was a new reward programme called Kudos in which players receive a special item after completing the weekly challenge. Smallworlds replaced the gold payout that players paid for as a bonus with only XP rewards now.

Smallworld's had another major user-interface making it much sleeker and less jumbled by combining controls and features into collapsible panels on 13 June 2016.

== Decline and shutdown ==
In February 2018, an I <3 SmallWorlds event was launched with an aim to increase online store purchases. Players were encouraged to purchase from SmallWorlds' online store packages, Gold, and VIP memberships to support SmallWorlds financially. SmallWorlds stated the company faced a shrinking audience and poor player numbers since 2015.

It was announced on 13 March 2018 that SmallWorlds and MiniMundos would shut down on 8 April 2018. The closure was blamed on a shrinking audience, financial struggles, and business laws in New Zealand.

SmallWorlds and MiniMundos officially were discontinued at 11:59PM on 8 April 2018 EDT. Players were active minutes before the shutdown and throughout the day hosting farewell events. An offline message stated that the company is in talks and hopes to resume service.
