= List of free massively multiplayer online games =

This is a selected list of notable massively multiplayer online games which are free-to-play in some form without ever requiring a subscription or other payment. These are commonly MMORPGs or MMOFPSs, but could be of any genre.

== Free play ==
These MMOGs provide client software free of charge and allow users to play the game without requiring payment. The games' expenses are typically funded by sponsors or through donations (which have no effect in the game itself).

	Developer(s)	Release date	Platform(s)	Genre	Synopsis	Type
Allegiance	Microsoft Research	March 16, 2000	Windows	Space Sim/RTS Hybrid	3D Space Combat with teamwork and RTS elements	3D
Astonia III	Intent Software/open source	December 31, 2001	Windows, Linux	Fantasy MMORPG	MMORPG with an isometric view, originally was pay-to-play from 2001 until 2014 when the official servers shut down and the creator released the source code; thus, creating free-to-play fan-made communities.	2D
Astro Battle	Lava Lord Games	December 31, 2004	Windows, Linux	Multi-directional shooter	Overhead multi-directional shoot-em-up where players design their own ships	2D
Crossfire	n/a	1992	Multi-platform, including Windows, OS X, Linux and others.	Medieval fantasy MMORPG	Open source cross between NetHack and Gauntlet.	2D
Gekkeiju Online	Coolhouse Productions	2003	Windows	Medieval fantasy MMORPG	Players control an anime like character in a medieval fantasy world.	3D
Infantry Online	Harmless Games LLC; Sony Online Entertainment	1999	Windows	Action	Players take the role of soldiers on an isometric battleground and fight in a variety of gametypes.	2.5D
Meridian 59	Archetype Interactive (original); Near Death Studios (current)	December 15, 1995	Windows	Role playing	Play as an adventurer in a medieval sword-and-sorcery world alongside other adventurers	3D
Myst Online: Uru Live	Cyan Worlds	February 8, 2010 (first release November 11, 2003)	Windows	Adventure MMORPG	Players explore different worlds, uncover clues and solve puzzles together	3D
Omerta	Omerta Game Limited	September 26, 2003	Browser-based	MMORPG, Mafia		Text
PlaneShift	Atomic Blue	2016 (first release 2003)	Windows, OS X, Linux	Medieval fantasy MMORPG	An open source, fantasy MMORPG with strong emphasis on roleplaying.	3D
SubSpace	Burst, Virgin Interactive, fan community	November 30, 1997	Windows	Action	Players fly, fight and play a variety of games with spaceships.	2D
Terra	Kaon Interactive (original); Terra Outlands (current)	June 1997	Windows	Action	Play as a vehicle operator in a 24/7 3D virtual world individual or clan based battle game	3D
Underlight	Lyra Studios	March 1998	Windows	Medieval fantasy MMORPG	Play as a dreamer in the city of dreams, in a unique role-playing environment (in-character at all times). The game features live action FPS combat, an advancement system where players write quests for other players, and a unique faction system with fixed houses that are player run.	3D
Urban Dead	Kevan Davis	July 3, 2005	Browser-based	Survival horror	Play as a human or a zombie trying to survive in the undead-infested city of Malton.	Text
Virtual Air Traffic Simulation Network (VATSIM)	n/a	July 2001	n/a	Flight simulation	Uses existing flight simulation software with custom plug-ins, players may interact with the network as either pilots or air traffic controllers.	
Wyvern	Steve Yegge, Cabochon, Inc.	February 4, 2001	Windows, OS X, Linux, iOS, Android	Fantasy MMORPG	Crossfire and NetHack inspired game where players take on the mantle of adventurer and battle monsters in their quest.	2D

== Free play with advertising ==
These MMOGs are free to play. They are funded through advertising, either in-game or through pop-ups.

	Developer(s)	Release date	Platform(s)	Genre	Synopsis	Type
Agar.io	Zeach	April 28, 2015	Browser-based	Action	Thousands of Cells compete for survival. Eat or be eaten.	Web
Anarchy Online	Funcom	June 27, 2001	Windows	MMORPG, Science-fiction	Two factions fight for control of a distant desert planet.	3D
Jennifer Government: NationStates	Max Barry	November 13, 2002	Browser-based	Government simulation game	Players build nations and run them according to their political ideals.	Web
Slither.io	Steve Howse	March 25, 2016	Browser-based	Casual	Hundreds of worms in the same area eat dots to get bigger without running into each other's tails.	Web

== Free play with micro-transactions ==
These MMOGs are free to play, but players may optionally purchase in-game items or currency.

Key
Active	Servers are currently available
Closed	Servers have been discontinued
Unknown	Server status is unknown

	Developer(s)	Release date	Platform(s)	Genre	Payment	Synopsis	Type	Status
Age of Empires Online	Microsoft Game Studios	August 16, 2011	Windows	MMORTS	Free play with in-game currency and items that can be purchased from a shop or earned through gameplay	Gameplay from the Age of Empires series offering online MMO features.	3D	Closed July 1, 2014
Age of Wulin	Suzhou Snail Electronic Co., Ltd.	April 10, 2013	Windows	MMORPG		Chinese fantasy martial arts PvP game with persistent characters.	3D	Active
Albion Online	Sandbox Interactive	July 17, 2017	Windows, OS X, Linux, iOS, Android	MMORPG		Albion online offers a selection of "Starter Packs" which grant players access to the game and offer a varying amount of gold to get started. Once a player purchases any of the starter packs, they will be granted open-ended access to the game with no extra mandatory fees.	3D	Active
Allods Online	Astrum Nival	February 16, 2010	Windows	MMORPG	Free to play with items that can be purchased from a shop	Traditional 3D fantasy MMORPG with quests, NPCs, dungeons, guilds, PvE and PvP.	3D	Active
Angels Online	UserJoy Technology	2006	Windows, PlayStation 3	Medieval fantasy MMORPG	Free to play with items that can be purchased from a shop	Players control an anime like character in a medieval fantasy world.	2D	Active
ArchLord	NHN Corporation	October 3, 2006	Windows	Medieval fantasy MMORPG	Free play with in-game currency that can be purchased from a shop		3D	Closed January 1, 2014
Atlantica Online	NDOORS Interactive	October 30, 2008	Windows	Fantasy MMORPG	Free to play with items that can be purchased from a shop	Turn-based battles. Guild-controlled customizable cites. Certain features require guild membership.	3D	Active
Audition Online	T3 Entertainment	2005	Windows	Casual game	Free to play with items that can be purchased from a shop	Dance competition. Game style is similar to StepMania, Dance Dance Revolution and Bust A Groove.	3D	Active
Battlefield Play4Free	EA Digital Illusions CE, Easy Studios	April 4, 2011	Windows	FPS	Game is supported by micro-transactions where players can purchase equipment and weapon upgrades.	Free-to-play remake of Battlefield 2 with updated graphics and gameplay.	3D	Closed July 14, 2015
Cabal Online	ESTSoft	2006	Windows	Sci-fi MMORPG	Free to play with items that can be purchased from a shop	MMORPG with a combo battle system.	3D	Active
Castle of Heroes	SNAIL Game	2009	Browser-based	MMORTS	Free to play with items that can be purchased from a shop	Strategy MMORPG taking place in a medieval fantasy universe.	Web	Active
DarkSpace	Palestar	December 21, 2001	Windows	Sci-fi MMORPG	Free to play with purchasable credits to use in game enhancements and special items	Sci-fi tactical space combat with strategy in a team orientated game. Players gain rank and prestige, which expands the ships they can command and the strategic decisions they make.	3D	Active
Dead Frontier	Neil Yates	2008	Browser-based	Horror	Free to play with purchasable credits to use in game enhancements and special items	Third-person shooters where players create and build up their character through PvE looting, missions, and trade.	3D, 2D and Web	Active
DECO Online	Rocksoft	2007	Windows	MMORPG	Free to play with items that can be purchased from a shop	Combo based combat. Players can earn fame, enhance items and change job.	3D	Closed April 5, 2011
Domain of Heroes	Tandem Games	2008	Browser-based	Fantasy, Text Based, MMORPG	Free to play with items that can be purchased from a shop	Players create and build up their character through PvP, PvE, quests and trade.	Web	Closed March 2015
Dragon Nest	Nexon, Shanda and Eyedentity Games	July 26, 2011	Windows	MMORPG	Free to play with items that can be purchased from a shop	Anime-styled fantasy MMORPG	3D	Active
Dragon Oath	ChangYou	2007	Windows	MMORPG	Free to play with items that can be purchased from a shop	Players follow one of the nine ancient forms of Kung Fu to gain skills and advance through a fantasy world based on Chinese mythology.	3D	Active
Dragonica	Gravity Interactive, Inc.	June 10, 2009	Windows	Fantasy MMORPG	Free to play with items that can be purchased from a shop	Anime/manga styled side-scrolling hack & slash.	3D	Unknown
Drift City	NPLUTO	September 5, 2007	Windows	Racing	Free to play with items that can be purchased from a shop	Players progress through a linear mission system with multiplayer races.	3D	Unknown
Dungeon Fighter Online	Nexon	June 9, 2010	Windows	Fantasy MMORPG	Free to play with items that can be purchased from a shop.	Formerly known as "Dungeon & Fighter" and "Arad Senki."	2D	Active
Dungeons & Dragons Online	Turbine, Inc.	February 28, 2006	Windows	MMORPG	Free to play with items and privileges that can be purchased from a shop	MMORPG based on Dungeons & Dragons.	3D	Active
Empire & State	Novel, Inc.	November 2011	Browser-based	MMORPG	Free to play with items that can be purchased from a shop	Political strategy	2D	Unknown
Entropia Universe	MindArk	January 30, 2003	Windows	MMORPG, MMOFPS, Science-fiction	Free to play with items that can be purchased from a shop	Massive virtual universe with a in-game currency linked to the USD.	3D	Active
Exteel	NCsoft	December 2007	Windows	Third-person shooter	Free to play with items that can be purchased from a shop	Customize and control giant mech. PvP and PvE.	3D	Closed Sept. 1, 2010
Fiesta Online	Outspark Games	November 7, 2007	Windows	Medieval fantasy MMORPG	Free to play with items that can be purchased from a shop	MMORPG with player classes, levels and housing.	3D	Active
Flyff	Aeonsoft	December 2005	Windows	Fantasy MMORPG	Free to play with items that can be purchased from a shop	Fantasy RPG with emphasis on the community.	3D	Active
Global Agenda	Hi-Rez Studios	February 1, 2010	Windows	Third-person Shooter	Free to play with items that can be purchased from the cash shop and one time buy option	Sci-fi shooter mmo with rpg based character advancement and team oriented combat.	3D	Unknown
Goodgame Empire	Goodgame Studios	August 14, 2011	Browser based (Flash)	Middle Ages MMORPG	Free to play with items that can be purchased from a shop	Building a castle, create a powerful army and fight player versus player battles on a dynamic world map.	3D	Active
Granado Espada	imc GAMES	2007	Windows	MMORPG	Free to play with items that can be purchased from a shop	Control up to 3 characters at the same time.	3D	Unknown
Guns and Robots	Masthead Studios	2013	Windows	Third-person shooter	Free to play with items that can be purchased from a shop	Wide variety of customizable parts, build robots, fight in different arenas.	3D	Unknown
GunZ: The Duel	MAIET Entertainment	2003	Windows	Third-person shooter	Free to play with items that can be purchased from a shop	Player characters fight on different levels and kill each other to level up.	3D	Unknown
Hattrick	Extralives	August 30, 1997	Browser-based	Sports game	Free to play with privileges that can be purchased from a shop	Players manage a simulated soccer team to compete with others.	Web	Active
Illyriad	Illyriad Games Ltd	2011	Browser-based	Fantasy Real-time strategy	Free to play with in-game currency and privileges that can be purchased from a shop	Fantasy MMORTS with city and empire building.	Web	Unknown
Imperium Galactic War	Vavel Games and Kabam	2013	Browser-based	Fantasy Real-time strategy	Free to play with in-game currency and privileges that can be purchased from a shop	Players manage a star base, build fleets form alliances and conquer the galaxy.	Web	Active
Jade Dynasty (video game)	Perfect World Entertainment	May 21, 2009	Windows	MMORPG	Free to play with items that can be purchased from a shop	Martial arts style game with a good vs evil theme.	3D	Unknown
La Tale	Actoz Soft	September 18, 2009	Windows	MMORPG	Free to play with items that can be purchased from a shop	Players take the role of adventurers in a mythological fantasy world.	2D	Active
Lunia: Record of Lunia War	allm	February 18, 2008	Windows	Action MMORPG	Free to play with items that can be purchased from a shop	Action RPG with emphasis on combat, storytelling and PvP.	3D	Unknown
Mabinogi	Nexon	June 2004	Windows	Fantasy	Free to play with items and privileges that can be purchased from a shop	Based on Irish mythology, with an emphasis on life in fantasy world rather than hack and slash.	3D	Active
MapleStory	Nexon	April 29, 2003	Windows	Fantasy MMORPG	Free to play with items that can be purchased from a shop	Action RPG elements, quests, party quests and guild quests.	2D	Active
Miniconomy	Trade Games International	January 1, 2001	Browser-based	MMO Trade Game	Free to play with items and privileges that can be purchased from a shop	Browser-based trading game where players all start equal and have to sell to and buy from, each other to become the richest within a given timeframe	Web	Unknown
MLB Dugout Heroes	OnNet Co. Ltd.	2009	Windows	Sports	Free to play with items that can be purchased from a shop	Sports MMO that revolves around baseball using MLBPA licensed players.	3D	Unknown
Myth War Online	IGG	July 7, 2006	Windows	MMORPG	Free to play with items that can be purchased from a shop		2D	Unknown
Need for Speed: World	EA Black Box	July 27, 2010	Windows	MMORG, Racing	Free to play with items that can be purchased from a shop	Online racing game	3D	Closed July 14, 2015
PangYa	Ntreev Soft	2007	Windows	Sports game	Free to play with items that can be purchased from a shop	Anime style, arcade golf game.	3D	Closed December 12, 2016
Perfect World	Perfect World Entertainment	July 2005	Windows	MMORPG	Free to play with items that can be purchased from a shop	Game world based on Chinese mythology.	3D	Active
Phoenix Dynasty Online	Object Software	2007	Windows	fantasy MMORPG	Free to play with items that can be purchased from a shop	players can learn and practice the Chinese Kungfu to advance their character and rule the dynasty.	2D	Unknown
Pirates of the Burning Sea	Flying Lab Software	2008	Windows	MMORPG	Free to play with items and access to content that can be purchased from an item shop	The game is set in the Caribbean in 1720 and combines tactical ship and swashbuckling combat with a player-driven economy	3D	Unknown
PoxNora	Octopi, Inc.	August 2006	Windows, OS X, Linux	Real-time strategy, Fantasy	Free to play with items that can be purchased from a shop			Unknown
Priston Tale	Triglow Pictures Inc.	May 17, 2007	Windows	Fantasy MMORPG	Free to play with items that can be purchased from a shop	Fantasy MMORPG	3D	Unknown
Puzzle Pirates	Grey Havens, LLC (formerly Three Rings Design)	December 8, 2003	Windows, OS X, Linux	Pirate-themed MMO based on puzzles.	Free to play with items and privileges that can be purchased from a shop	Players perform tasks as pirates by playing a number of puzzle-style mini games.	2D	Active
Ragnarok Online	Gravity Interactive, Inc.	2003	Windows	Fantasy MMORPG	Free to play with items that can be purchased from a shop	Players choose from dozens of character classes to level. Endgame activities focus on acquiring better equipment, hunting boss monsters (MvPs), PvP and large weekly guild vs. guild (War of Emperium) to capture castles.	3D/2D	Active
Red Stone (video game)	L&K Logic Korea	2004	Windows	Fantasy MMORPG	Free to play with items that can be purchased from a shop	16 classes to choose from. Has a class transformation & cp system.	2D	Unknown
Regnum Online	NGD Studios	May 24, 2007	Windows, OS X, Linux	Fantasy	Free to play with items that can be purchased from a shop	Players join a realm in a fight against 2 other realms. Other than PvP, players can capture forts and castles.	3D	Unknown
RF Online	Codemasters	2006	Windows	Sci-Fi, Fantasy	Free to play with items that can be purchased from a shop	Set in a distant planet where magic and technology co-exist, emphasizes a 3-way race vs. race vs. race PVP system	3D	Unknown
ROSE Online	Gravity Interactive, Inc.	2005	Windows	Fantasy MMORPG	Free to play with items that can be purchased from a shop		3D	Active
Rumble Fighter	OGplanet	2007	Windows	Fantasy Fighting	Free to play with items that can be purchased from a shop		3D	Closed
Runes of Magic	Frogster	March 19, 2009	Windows	Fantasy MMORPG	Free to play with items that can be purchased from a shop		3D	Active
Samurai Taisen	PST Team	2013	Browser based	MMORTS	Free to play with items that can be purchased from a shop	Massively-multiplayer online real time strategy game set in Sengoku period.	Web	Unknown
Secret of the Solstice	DNC Entertainment	2008	Windows	Fantasy	Free to play with items that can be purchased from a shop	Set in the world of Xen, players complete quests and customize characters using branching job trees.	3D	Unknown
Sentou Gakuen	PST Team	2012	Browser based	MMORPG	Free to play with items that can be purchased from a shop	Massively-multiplayer online role playing game set in high-school.	Web	Unknown
Shot Online	OnNet Co. Ltd.	2004	Windows	Sports	Free to play with items that can be purchased from a shop	Sports MMO that revolves around golf	3D	Unknown
Silkroad Online	Joymax Co., Ltd	2004	Windows	MMORPG	Free to play with items that can be purchased from a shop	Fantasy MMORPG set in the 7th century AD.	3D	Unknown
Spiral Knights	Grey Havens, LLC (formerly Three Rings Design and Sega)	2011	Windows, OS X, Linux	Action MMORPG	Free to play with purchasable credits to use in game enhancements and special items	Action MMORPG focusing on instant, fast-paced action.	3D	Active
Star Sonata 2	Landaeur Games	2011	Windows, OS X, Linux	MMORPG	Free to play with privileges that can be purchased	Strategic Action Space Game with Trading, Colonization, Conqeuring and more	3D	Active
Star Trek Online	Cryptic	2010	Windows, OS X	Sci-Fi, MMORPG	Free to play with items that can be purchased from the cryptic store	Strategic action space combat, with away team ground missions.	3D	Active
Stronghold Kingdoms	Firefly Studios	2011	Windows	MMORTS	Free to play with items that can be purchased from a shop	Massively-multiplayer online real time strategy game with a medieval castle building theme.	2D	Unknown
Tales of Pirates	MOLI	March 24, 2008	Windows		Piracy	Free to play with items that can be purchased from a shop	3D	Unknown
Terra Militaris	SNAIL Game	2010	Browser-based	MMORTS	Free to play with items that can be purchased from a shop	Strategy MMORPG taking place in a historical universe.	Web	Unknown
The 4th Coming	Dialsoft	1999	Windows	Fantasy	A number of licensees provide the game free to play. Usually one can buy characters starting out at higher levels.	Fantasy MMORPG	2D	Unknown
The Lord of the Rings Online	Turbine, Inc.	2007	Windows, OS X	MMORPG	Free to play with items and privileges that can be purchased from an item shop	MMORPG in J. R. R. Tolkien's fantasy world Middle-earth, based on The Lord of the Rings.	3D	Active
Transformice	Atelier 801	2010	Windows, OS X, Linux	MMO, Platform	Free play with in-game currency and items that can be purchased from a shop or earned through gameplay	Collect cheese playing as a mouse and take it back to the hole.	2D	Active
Travian	Travian Games GmbH	2004	Browser-based	Historical strategy	Free to play with in-game currency and privileges that can be purchased from a shop	Players interact in a virtual world set roughly in Classical antiquity at the time of the Roman Empire.	Web	Unknown
Trickster Online	Ntreev Soft	April 2003	Windows	Fantasy MMORPG	Free to play with items that can be purchased from a shop		3D	Closed January 2014
Twelve Sky	Aeria Games	September 24, 2007	Windows	MMORPG	Free to play with items that can be purchased from a shop	Fantasy MMORPG, medieval-styled	3D	Unknown
Twinity	ExitReality	2008	Windows	MMORPG	Free to play, in-game currency can be purchased.	Freeform play / chat. Players can sell their own virtual creations.	3D	Unknown
Vindictus	Nexon	September 17, 2010	Windows	MMORPG	Free to play with items that can be purchased from a shop	Fantasy MMORPG, medieval-styled	3D	Active
Vikings: War of Clans	Plarium Games	August 10, 2015	iOS, Android, Browser	MMORPG	Free to play with items that can be purchased from a shop	Fantasy MMORPG, medieval-styled	2D	Active
Voyage Century Online	Snail Game	December 22, 2006	Windows	Historical nautical	Free to play with items that can be purchased from a shop	Set in the 17th century and features accurate historical representations of several coastal cities.	3D	Unknown
War of Legends	Jagex	January 19, 2010	Browser-based (Flash)	Fantasy MMORTS	Free to play with items that can be purchased from a shop	MMORTS with a historical Chinese mythological theme.	2D	Closed January 29, 2015
WonderKing Online	NDOORS Interactive	June 19, 2009	Windows	Fantasy MMORPG	Free to play with items that can be purchased from a shop	Action RPG elements, quests, party quests and guild quests.	2D	Unknown
Wonderland Online	IGG	April 9, 2008 (Globally)	Windows	Fantasy MMORPG	Points cards can be redeemed in Item Mall.	Players work together to survive after a shipwreck	2D	Closed January 2019
Scions of Fate	IGG	2005	Windows	MMORPG	Free to play with items that can be purchased from a shop	Based on a Korean comic of the same name.		Unknown

== Optional paid subscriptions ==
These MMOGs offer optional additional game content through paid subscription, but are otherwise free to play.

	Developer(s)	Release date	Platform(s)	Genre	Payment	Synopsis	Type	Status
Age of Conan: Unchained	Funcom	2008	Windows	Fantasy MMORPG	Free or premium (paid) accounts available		3D	Active
Animal Jam Classic	WildWorks	2010	Windows, Mac	Educational MMORPG, strategy	Free or premium (paid) accounts available, premium accounts can access more animals and adventures, also purchase more items.	Players can become an animal and roam Jamaa and participate in story adventures	2D	Active
APB:Reloaded	K2 Network (as Gamersfirst)	2010	Windows	Contemporary, crime & law MMORPG	Free to play with optional subscription options for faster game progression and some in-game perks. Clothing, vehicles and weapons available for purchase with secondary in-game currency purchased with real money.	Play as criminal ("Crim") or vigilante ("Enforcer") in the fictional city of San Paro. Team- and mission-based Player versus player	3D (TPV)	Active
Blood Wars	BW Team	2006	Browser-based	Post-apocalypse MMORPG	Free or premium (paid) accounts available	Become a vampire and fight with others in the last city in the world.	Web	Unknown
Club Penguin	Disney and New Horizon Interactive	August 28, 2005	Browser-based (Flash)	Chat	Free or premium (paid) accounts available, premium accounts allow purchasing items and customization for the avatar and the avatar's living quarters.	Players play mini games to earn coins to spend on things for their character or house	2D	Closed March 29, 2017
CrimeCraft	Vogster Entertainment	August 25, 2009	Windows	Post Apocalyptic MMO Third Person Shooter	Free to play with optional monthly subscription options for extra content; special items available for purchase with secondary in-game currency purchased with real money.	Shooter with role-playing elements.	3D	Unknown
Dofus	Ankama Games	September 2004	Browser-based (Flash)	MMORPG	Free or premium (paid) accounts available		2D	Active
EverQuest	SOE San Diego	1999	Windows	Fantasy MMORPG	Free or premium (paid) accounts available		3D	Active
EverQuest II	SOE San Diego	2004	Windows	Fantasy MMORPG	Free or premium (paid) accounts available		3D	Active
Face of Mankind	Duplex Systems	December 29, 2009	Windows	Science fiction MMORPG	Free or premium (paid) accounts available	Open PVP Role-playing	3D	Unknown
Final Fantasy XIV	Square Enix	August, 2013	Windows PS4	Fantasy MMORPG	Permanent free trial with a paid subscription for the full game.	Real Time Role-playing	3D	Active
Forumwarz	Crotch Zombie Productions	February 2008	Browser based	Multiplayer browser game, Strategy	Free play	RPG parodying internet culture	Web	Unknown
Free Realms	SOE San Diego	April 28, 2009	Windows, PlayStation 3	Fantasy MMO Adventure game	Free to play with optional monthly subscription for extra content; special items available for purchase with secondary in-game currency purchased with real money	Fantasy world designed to be a family friendly environment	3D	Closed March 3, 2014
Furcadia	Dragon's Eye Productions	December 16, 1996	Windows, Third party Mac support	2D Isometric Chat and socializing online game.	Free-play available but payment options such as purchasing "Digos". Digos include premium avatars, in-game wings of several types and other customizable features. Players may purchase 'Silver Sponsorships', which provide a number of game-enhancing abilities and features	Community-centric chat and Fantasy Role-Play based Anthropomorphic game with user-created content.	2D	Unknown
Horseland	Horseland LLC	1998	Browser-based	Chat	Free to play with optional subscription to pay for own stables and other privileges.	An online community where players can raise horses and dogs.		Closed January 1, 2019
Knight Online	MGame Corporation	2004	Windows	Medieval war	Some servers are free to play		3D	Unknown
NEO Shifters	Frima Studio	2007	Browser-based	Science-fiction strategy	Free-to-play game with optional subscription.	Players choose their robot faction and fight for resources.	2D	Unknown
OGame	Gameforge Productions	October 15, 2007	Windows	Science-fiction strategy	Advertising-based free-to-play version. Paid subscriptions and premium benefits are also available.	Build and maintain a galactic empire.	Web	Unknown
Pirates of the Caribbean Online	Disney	October 31, 2007	Windows, Mac OS	Piracy	Can play free, though paying option offers numerous more upgrades and features.	Players create their own pirate, do quests, interact with others, follow a similar storyline from the Pirates of the Caribbean movies.	2D and 3D	Unknown
PlanetSide 2	Daybreak Game Company	November 20, 2012	Windows	First-person shooter		Futuristic massively multiplayer online first-person shooter	3D	Active
Puzzle Pirates	Grey Havens, LLC (formerly Three Rings Design)	December 8, 2003	Windows, Mac OS, Linux	Puzzle video game	Some servers require a monthly subscription to play on, while others are free but require micro-transactions for some items. (Note that even the monthly subscription servers can be paid for via micro-transactions, without direct cash payment.)	Players perform tasks as pirates by playing a number of puzzle-style mini-games.	2D	Active
Rift	Trion Worlds	March, 2011	Windows	High fantasy MMORPG	Play without a paid subscription up to level 60. Storm Legion souls and some game features require subscription or purchase through in game shop.	Takes place in the world of Telara. Players' characters of either the noble Guardians or techno-magical Defiants defend their world from the invading elemental planes in non-instanced Rifts.	3D	Active
Rubies of Eventide	Mnemosyne, LLC	2003	Windows	Medieval fantasy	Free play or paid accounts available, with server priority given to the latter	Players can join different servers according to their play style: RP, PvP or normal play.	3D	Unknown
RuneScape	Jagex	2001	Windows, Mac OS, Linux	Medieval fantasy, MMORPG	Free play or paid accounts available, paid accounts have access to many more skills, areas, weapons and quests. Additional ingame benefits are available through microtransactions.	Features a vast array of skills, quests and mini-games.	3D	Active
Ryzom	Winch Gate Property, Ltd.	2004	Windows, Linux	Role playing	Free to play. A paid subscription is necessary for character advancement beyond a certain level.	High fantasy world. Open source code and artistic material.	3D	Active
Second Life	Linden Lab	2003	Windows, OS X, Linux	Virtual world	Free to play with in-game currency and privileges that can be purchased with a subscription	Freeform with in-game build system. Players can sell their own virtual creations.	3D	Active
Shattered Galaxy	KRU Interactive	2001	Windows	MMORTS	Free play or paid accounts available, with gameplay benefits to paying accounts.	Command a squad of up to 12 air or ground units in faction vs. faction warfare with as many as 20+ teammates.	2.5D	Active
Star Sonata	Star Sonata LLC	October 2004	Windows	Space MMORPG Action	Free to play with optional monthly subscription for extra content	Engage in space exploration, ship-to-ship combat, trade and galactic conquest to claim the seat of Emperor.	3D	Active
Star Wars: The Old Republic	LucasArts /BioWare	December 2011	Windows	Space MMORPG Action	Free to play with optional monthly subscription for extra content	Engage in Planet exploration, ship-to-ship combat, trade and questing with up to six different classes and sub classes(empire or republic) and several races to choose from.	3D	Active
Tibia	CipSoft	1997	Windows, Linux, Browser-based (Flash)	Fantasy	Free to play with restricted content. Can upgrade to a "Premium Account" for full content.	Character development based on killing monsters and (optionally) doing quests and fighting other players.	2D	Active
Toontown Online	Walt Disney Internet Group	June 2, 2003	Windows, OS X	Cartoon	Free to play. Players could purchase membership to unlock items, clothing, neighborhoods, etc.	3D child-friendly environment where players took on the rules of cartoon characters in a battle against 'The Evil Cogs'. Completed Toontasks to earn weapon upgrades such as cakes and water squirters.	3D	Closed September 19, 2013
vSide	ExitReality	May 15, 2006	Windows, OS X	Virtual World	Free to play with in-game currency and privileges that can be purchased with a subscription	Music centered social MMOG.	3D	Closed
Wizard101	KingsIsle Entertainment	September 2, 2008	Windows, OS X	Cartoon	Free to play. Players can purchase membership to unlock locations and quests.	Players take on the role of students of Wizardry to save the Spiral (which is the set of worlds this game takes place in) and battle a variety of creatures by casting spells using a turn-based combat system similar to collectible card.	3D	Active
Wurm Online	Mojang OneTooFree AB Sunsplash Creations	2006	Browser-based	Medieval fantasy MMORPG	Free or premium (paid) accounts available	Community-centric fantasy MMORPG that strives to emulate real life in a medieval fantasy setting.	3D	Active

== See also ==
- List of massively multiplayer online games
- List of free multiplayer online games
- List of MMORPGs
- List of multiplayer browser games
- Multiplayer video game
- Browser based game
