= Daniel James (game developer) =

British-Canadian video game developer

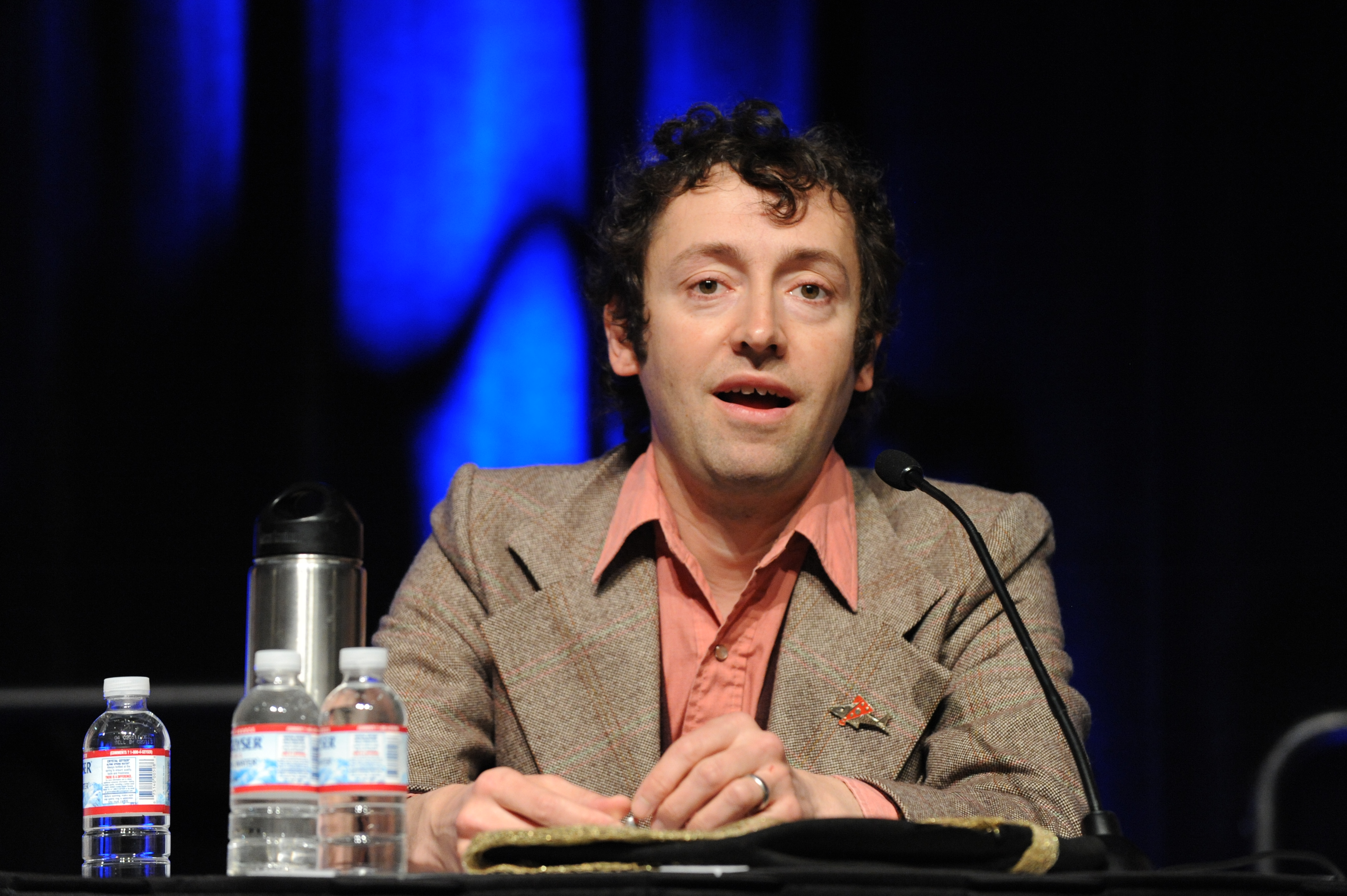
- Daniel James at the Game Developers Conference in 2011
- Born: 1971 (age 53–54); London, United Kingdom
- Occupation: Video game developer
- Known for: Three Rings Design
- Website: djames.org

Daniel James (born 1971, London), is a British-Canadian video game developer based in San Francisco. He is a co-founder and CEO of Three Rings Design, the company behind the MMOGs Yohoho! Puzzle Pirates, Bang! Howdy, Whirled and Spiral Knights.

== Biography ==
James was born in 1971 in London, the only child of Allan James, a filmmaker who worked on titles such as Out of Africa and Superman, and Hope James, an interior designer and art teacher. James attended Holland Park School and Ealing, Hammersmith and West London College, and got involved with MUDs early, playing Essex MUD at the age of 12, in 1982. While still at university, he worked as a god on Avalon: The Legend Lives and co-founded the Avalon dial-up service in 1990, moving services to the internet in 1994, the same year that he graduated from the University of Leeds, with a degree in Computer Science and Philosophy. In 1995, he founded another company, Sense Internet. In 1998, he moved to the United States to work for Sierra Online, as a designer on Middle-earth Online.

While in the United States, he met Michael Bayne and they founded Three Rings Design to create Puzzle Pirates. It was launched in 2003. It has been followed by Bang Howdy, Whirled, Corpse Craft and Spiral Knights, in partnership with SEGA. In March 2011 Three Rings announced a partnership with the BBC to create an online game based on Doctor Who.

He is a member of the IGDA Online Games SIG, and a frequent speaker or moderator at industry conferences such as E³, GDC, and the Austin Games Conference.

== The First Church of the Grey Goo ==
According to ICANN's WhoIs James & Three Rings Design are the registrant for the website of The First Church of the Grey Goo. The site proclaims and praises the inevitability of nanomachines replacing mankind as "prophesied" by Bill Joy.

It is unclear whether this site is an attempt at humor, earnest, or related to an upcoming or unreleased video game. Registration was on February 16, 2000 and expires in 2016. There have been no changes to the site since its first archiving by the Wayback Machine on June 25, 2001. On February 11, 2020 the site's domain information has been updated, and expires in 2022.
