= Earthrise (disambiguation) =

Earthrise is a famous photograph taken on the 1968 Apollo 8 space mission.

Earthrise may also refer to:

- Earthrise (1990 video game), a computer game by Interstel
- Earthrise (album), a 1984 album by the Tandy Morgan Band
- Earthrise (film), a 2018 documentary by Emmanuel Vaughan-Lee
- Earthrise (video game), a 2011 massively multiplayer online role-playing game by Masthead Studios
  - Earthrise Engine
- Earthrise, a TV series on Al Jazeera English
- Earthrise, the second chapter to 2020's Transformers: War for Cybertron Trilogy cartoon
- Earthrise, a sub-orbital space "burial" mission by Celestis
- "Earthrise/Return", a song by Mannheim Steamroller from Fresh Aire V
- "Earthrise", a song by Camel from Mirage
- "Earthrise," a song by British metal band Haken on their 2016 album, Affinity
- "Earthrise," a song by American rock band Starset on their 2021 album, Horizons
- Earth phase, astronomical views of Earthrise and related

== See also ==
- Earth Rising, an American indie band
