= PDO =

PDO refer to:

== Chemistry ==
- 1,3-Propanediol, an industrial chemical
- Palladium(II) oxide (PdO)
- Polydioxanone, a synthetic polymer

== Computing ==
- PHP Data Objects, a PHP extension that can be used as a database abstraction layer
- Portable Distributed Objects, a version of Cocoa's Distributed Objects for remote use
- Process Data Object, a type of protocol frame in some fieldbuses, for instance, CANopen
- Power Delivery Object, in the USB-C specification

== Entertainment ==
- Panzer Dragoon Orta, a 3D shooter created by Smilebit on the Xbox
- Perfect Dark Zero, a 2005 video game
- Phoenix Dynasty Online, a 2007 fantasy MMORPG

== Other uses ==
- ISO 639:pdo or Padoe language, an Austronesian language spoken in South Sulawesi
- Pacific decadal oscillation, a pattern of climate variation
- Padre Aldamiz International Airport (Ident: PDO)
- Performing the Duties of, a description for acting officials
- Petroleum Development Oman, an Omani oil company and the part of the Omani capital region where the company is located
- Philips and Dupont Optical, a CD manufacturer that was associated with the Compact Disc bronzing issue
- Protected designation of origin, the name of an area that is used as a designation for an agricultural product or foodstuff
- Pseudo-differential operator, a concept in mathematical analysis
- An advanced statistic in ice hockey
- "Paid day off", a type of paid time off

== See also ==
- Perfect Dark Zero (PD0), a 2005 videogame in the Perfect Dark (Joanna Dark) series
- Palladium catalysts of the form "Pd(0)"
