= Godswar =

Godswar may refer to:

- Godswar, a fictional entity in Forgotten Realms, a campaign setting for Dungeons & Dragons
- GodsWar Online, a massively multiplayer online role-playing game
