= Corpse Craft: Incident at Weardd Academy =

2008 video game

- Developer: Grey Havens
- Platforms: Adobe Flash, iOS
- Release: Adobe Flash; 2008 iOS; December 1, 2010
- Genres: Real-time strategy, Puzzle
- Modes: Single-player, Multiplayer

Corpse Craft: Incident at Weardd Academy is a Flash and web browser game developed by Grey Havens and released on their game portal Whirled in 2008. A version for the iPad was released on December 1, 2010.

== Gameplay ==
The game is a combination of basic real-time strategy and puzzle game elements which takes place on single-screen levels. Players must gather resources from an area located along the bottom of the playing screen, which is filled with squares in four different colors. These resources are used to create different types of zombies to attack the enemy's base of operations, a shed. Once the opponents' sheds has been demolished, the story is advanced and play proceeds to the next level. Unlike typical real-time strategy games there is no infrastructure to be built and units cannot be upgraded or directly controlled. The first eight levels of the game can be played for free using the Flash version of the game, further advancement in the game requires one United States dollar to be paid (as of 2012 update, every part of the game is now free).

The four different colors of square within the resource gathering area represent flesh, blood, energy and scrap. These must be collected in order to create zombies, the volume of each needed varies according to the type of zombie the player wishes to reanimate. Resources can be collected by clicking on any square which is horizontally or vertically connected to at least two more squares of the same type, without breaks in the chain. The player cannot move resource squares around the grid, only select which square to remove, along with any others if it forms part of a chain. The larger the number of resource squares in a chain, the more of that type of resource will be allocated to the player's reserves.

During play both sides of the conflict are beholden to the day and night cycle present in the game. All zombies in play are destroyed at daybreak, further combatants cannot be created until nightfall. The daytime is an opportunity to collect resources without fear of attack.

== Plot ==
The game is set within a gothic version of London city, the style of which has been likened to the work of artist Edward Gorey and film director Tim Burton. The game's plot is advanced through limericks displayed before each level of play. The game is primarily located at the Eygor Weardd's School for Responsible Reanimation, an academy where students learn to reanimate corpses under the tutelage of Weardd. When the school burns down, killing the headmaster, a bright student named Ralph suspects his rival Jack of involvement. This results in the school courtyard becoming a battleground, with both students sending their undead creations into the fray.

== Critical reception ==
Reception

Aggregate score
Aggregator	Score
Metacritic	86/100

Review scores
Publication	Score
The A.V. Club	B
Eurogamer	8/10
Gamezebo	(Flash) 80/100
TouchArcade	4/5

The iOS version received "favorable" reviews according to the review aggregation website Metacritic.
