= IGG Inc. =

Chinese video game company

- Type: Public
- Traded as: SEHK: 799
- Industry: Video games
- Founded: June 3, 2006; 20 years ago
- Headquarters: Singapore
- Products: Lords Mobile, Castle Clash, Clash of Lords 2
- Revenue: ▼HK$ 6.05 billion (2021)
- Net income: ▼HK$452.8 million (2021)
- Website: www.igg.com

IGG Inc. (I Got Games, also previously known as Internet Gaming Gate) is a Chinese video game developer and publisher. The company was founded in 2006 in Fuzhou, Fujian, China. IGG is now headquartered in Singapore, namely "IGG Singapore Pte. Ltd." (formerly "Sky Union Pte. Ltd."), since 2009 and has branches in China, the United States, Canada, Japan, South Korea, Belarus, Thailand, Philippines and Hong Kong.

IGG is best known for the development of mobile games such as Lords Mobile, Castle Clash, Clash of Lords, and for formerly publishing various massively multiplayer online games in North America. IGG has been listed by App Annie as one of the "Top 52 Publishers" for seven consecutive years.

"Lords Mobile", launched in 2016, is IGG's first cross-platform, multi-language, real-time game designed for global gamers. As at 30 June 2020, it has approximately 320 million registered users worldwide. According to App Annie, "Lords Mobile" had dominated the worldwide rankings as the top-grossing mobile war strategy game for two consecutive years since its launch.

"Fate War", launched in 2025, is IGG's second cross-platform, multi-language, real-time game designed for global gamers.

== Company ==
IGG primarily focuses on the research and development of video games and software, but is also not limited to its other functions of business such as operations, product promotions and e-commerce. Mobile games are by far IGG's biggest products, which include Lords Mobile. MMORPGs include GodsWar Online, Voyage Century Online, Wonderland Online, Tales of Pirates, and Myth War Online. IGG has also developed multiple streaming platforms such as WeGamers and Pocketlive.

On October 18, 2013 IGG was listed on the Hong Kong Stock Exchange, followed by an official transfer on July 7, 2015 from being on the GEM board to the Main Board with the current stock number of 799.HK.

In January 2016 IGG was voted as the "Most Promising HKEx Listed Companies" in the 13th China's Financial Annual Champion Awards. In the selection of Top 50 Global Mobile Game Company held by Pocket Gamer, IGG ranked the 17th. In May, it launched new game Lords Mobile in North America, ranked TOP 2 in American IOS F2P list.

Lords Mobile also won the "Best Competitive Game" followed by an Android Excellence award in 2017. In 2013, IGG transformed to a "mid-core" operator from a "hard-core" game maker. IGG also established development centres in 10 countries and hired developers from different countries in 2019.

== Free-to-play model ==
Free-to-play, also known as F2P or FtP, refers to video games which give players access to a significant portion of their content without paying. Since the company's creation, games of IGG have traditionally followed a freemium model where players can play a fully functional game for free, but also have the opportunity to upgrade their gaming experience through a variety of microtransactions. While supporters argue that F2P games give the players more financial freedom as to how much each individual player wants to play, critics of the system have claimed that the F2P model unfairly favors players who spend more on each game as shown by all games of this type across all the available platforms.

== Non-mobile game products ==
WeGamers was a social app launched in June 2016 to help players of IGG games to become more connected. The players could use this app as a way to discuss game strategies, to call for other players when in battle, or to simply chat like any other social app. Link Messenger is a messenger app launched in December 2015. Contrary to WeGamers, this app is similar to other messaging apps and not specifically targeted for the gaming community. WeGamers closed the servers on July 22, 2022.
