= Whirled =

2007 virtual community

- Available in: English
- Dissolved: April 8, 2017
- Owners: Three Rings Design (former); Grey Havens
- Website: https://www.whirled.com/
- Registration: Optional
- Launched: February 28, 2007

Whirled was a virtual world website and video game created by Three Rings Design. Its Open Beta stage was announced at the Game Developers Conference in 2007. It makes use of Adobe Flash as an applet embedded into the website while also having pages of HTML and JavaScript in a sidebar to allow players to manage their friends list and browse various categories of user-generated content. The concept is comparable to the virtual worlds in the PlayStation 3 game Home and Second Life, while also incorporating aspects of feed-based social media sites like Facebook and Twitter. It pushed to make all content user-created, mainly with its approach to creative accessibility using Flash's affinity for 2D vector graphics and various web compatibilities to make it simple for players to upload a wide variety of content using simple, conventional file formats. Some examples of this include uploading PNG files to create in-game objects, and MP3 files to create a music playlist for a player's room. More advanced creators could utilize Adobe Flash itself to create more intricate and interactive objects, such as intricate player-controlled avatars that Whirled became well known for.

== Current status ==
In March 2010, at the Flash Gaming Summit, Three Rings CEO Daniel James stated, "Whirled is at $300K revenue, $5M invested. Abject failure." He later clarified this statement on the Puzzle Pirates official forums, stating "Those are very approximate total investment in the project and total revenue to date. There are no profits. Whirled is wonderful in many ways, but its financial results are not yet good. We remain committed to trying to change that." After Three Rings Design deemed the project not financially viable in 2013, they handed over ownership of Whirled to Grey Havens and announced their plans to eventually dissolve the site, officially doing so on April 8, 2017.

== Mirror sites ==
Upon Grey Havens releasing the source code for Whirled under their BSD License, several mirror sites were created by fans. While they had no access to the original database, a lot of content was copied across to create a similar experience managed by the community; with only minor name, appearance, and feature differences.

=== Synced Online ===
Created on the 1st of August 2016, Synced Online (Note: syncedonline.com. Retrieved 2022-04-28. (This URL has since been stolen and may be dangerous.)) was created as a moderated alternative to Whirled, using its source code. It was initially only accessible via Hamachi, to players who had paid at least $10 for a Founder Pack. It was later made public via a domain on the 25th of August 2016. In the 2017 Whirled shutdown, large parts of its database were corrupted in the process—this left whatever was copied across to Synced Online as some of the only remaining remnants of Whirled.

Ultimately, Synced Online persisted as the most popular mirror despite being plagued by poor management and regular DDOS attacks.

=== Whirled Club ===
On the 31st of August 2018, Whirled Club was created to replace Glowbe. This mirror features 'Lampy' from Glowbe for this reason. This rendition also successfully brought back "parlor games" that allow you to play games that are directly embedded into the virtual world's rooms, a feature thought lost since Whirled's closure. During this time, Synced Online's succumbed to an attack that deleted their database leaving only an old backup. Upon finding this backup corrupted the site was closed leaving Whirled Club the only remnant of Whirled.

=== Smaller mirrors ===
Multiple other mirrors of Whirled have surfaced from the community over various time periods:

- WolvesWorld - another attempt at a closed Hamachi version Whirled;
- Glowbe - a return to the original aesthetics of Whirled with a new user experience and mascot 'Lampy'
- TensorTown - an ode to the Alpha version of Whirled codenamed Metasoy (a reference to Meta Son of Yohoho. "Yohoho!" was part of the old title of Puzzle Pirates (a.k.a. Y!PP)) and
- UnWhirled - designed as a corrupt version of Whirled's original style.

=== Post Adobe Flash shutdown ===
After Adobe Flash was discontinued On January 1, 2021, Whirled Club was reworked as a downloadable client. Alongside Whirled Club, Synced Online was also resurrected using its backup at the same domain—though, without a client of its own, it can only be fully accessed by browsers that still support Adobe Flash.

== Features ==
=== Avatars & Rooms ===
Whirled generally functions on the ability to control an avatar of the player's choosing inside of a room owned by any other player. Once in a Room, a player is displayed as their avatar, being able to walk around the room freely and type in the room's chat to other players. Many different avatars can be stored and purchased, but only one can be used at a time. Every avatar has its own specific states and actions as included by the creator, with no limit to how many may be included. The default, free avatar that a player starts with, an animated piece of tofu created by the game's developers, only includes the "default" idle state along with two simple dances. Furthermore, if an avatar was created by uploading an image file such as a JPEG or PNG file, they are known as "static" avatars that are converted into SWF avatar format by the site automatically, also giving it a primitive animation method by bouncing the image up and down.

Rooms also allow players to place objects inside them; such as Furniture, Pets, Backdrops, Toys, Game Launchers, Videos, or Photos. Music could also be added to a room's playlist in order to listen to it alongside other players. A "DJ" function was also added in development, allowing other players to play music in a room that isn't theirs, rotating between each player who has added music to the DJ list.

=== Stuff & Shop ===
The Shop is where users can buy items to decorate their home or Whirled with. Users list their own content to the Shop, and other users may then buy, rate, and comment on it. A large percentage of the profit from every purchase goes to the content creator. The type of an uploaded item affects how it will be used. Items are uploaded and categorized in the Shop and in a player's inventory (known as Stuff) as:

- Avatars
- Furniture
- Pets
- Backdrops
- Toys
- Games
- Music
- Photos
- Videos

=== Groups ===
Groups are places for groups of users to meet and chat with each other. The managers of a group can place objects in the different rooms contained in their group. Any player can freely enter a group, as long as the managers set it to be public. Groups are completely customizable with any object available in the shop and can create custom trophies specific to the group. Groups could also list items to the shop, allowing the group managers to automatically split the profits of each item among other members as they see fit.

=== Uploading ===
There are two ways of uploading in Whirled:

- Find of create an image and select "Upload" in the desired section of the user's items.
- Create an .swf file in Adobe Flash and upload it in the same way.

.swf files allow players to create fully animated creations, effectively embedding their own Flash file into the game itself. It would allow avatars to have walking animations, states, actions, transitions, and any other unique aspects the creator could define with ActionScript.

=== Passport ===
On August 21, 2008, along with interface changes, the Whirled Passport was introduced. It was a collection of stamps which the player earns in connection to achievements in Whirled, such as referring others to join, uploading content, or rating shop items. These stamps are similar to Trophies, another reward system in Whirled, except for the fact that stamps award the player coins for earning them.

=== Currency ===
Whirled initially launched with a straightforward currency that players were able to obtain through various in-game means, known as Coins. Coins were earned by playing games, filling out the passport, and selling content to other players in the store. Cheaper items would typically be of a lower quality than those which are more expensive, but it was entirely up to the seller how much an item would cost. Early on in the Open Beta period, a microtransactional currency that encouraged players to spend real-world money was introduced, named Bars. Players could choose to sell items both for Coins and Bars at their leisure, depending on how they wish to value the sold item. A separate currency, Bling, was added alongside Bars in order to allow content creators to eventually convert their earnings from selling items into Bars. In a 2013 update, both Bars and Bling were removed once Three Rings handed the site over to Grey Havens.

Whirled Games Menu

=== Trophies ===
Trophies are awards which can be unlocked by completing certain noteworthy achievements in trophy-enabled games. However, not all games are trophy-enabled. Socialization is one of the things for which Whirled was designed. The player's friends are displayed in a list, with the ones most recently online at the top. A player's friend list and profile will always be accessible, unless they lock their rooms. When a player logs in, the first page they see is their home Whirled, which they can customize to their liking with their own content or with items they bought in the shop.

=== Code ===
Whirled is programmed in Adobe Flash 9 and AJAX, using the Google Web Toolkit. Whirled's use of the GWT works in most modern web browsers. Because developing content for Whirled requires knowledge of ActionScript and Flash, there were plans for an online way to create simple content for Whirled.
