= Lords Mobile =

2016 freemium mobile strategy game

- Developer: IGG
- Publisher: IGG
- Engine: Unity
- Platforms: iOS, iPadOS, Android, Amazon, Microsoft Windows
- Release: February 26, 2016 (Android); March 30, 2016 (iOS); August 4, 2016 (Amazon); June 3, 2019 (Microsoft Windows)
- Genres: Strategy, massively multiplayer online game, business simulation
- Mode: Multiplayer

Lords Mobile is a real-time strategy and construction game developed and published by IGG. It was released on Android, iOS, and Steam globally on 14 March 2016. The game is free to play and offers in-app purchases. According to App Annie, the game is one of the top-grossing apps (strategy) on the App Store (iOS) and Google Play. The official description of the game states that it has more than 200 million players around the world.

In 2016, Lords Mobile won the Google Play Awards for "Best Competitive Game", and in 2017, it was nominated for "Best Multiplayer Game" and called "Android Excellence Game" by Google.

== Gameplay ==
Modes

The game combines role-playing, real-time strategy and city-building mechanics. Its gameplay consists of several game modes, the most notable of which are PVP-battles. Players develop their own base and build an army in order to attack enemy bases, destroy them, seize resources and capture enemy leaders. Usually, players can attack only enemies from their own kingdom, but during the Kingdom War (KvK), all servers (excluding new servers) are opened for attacks. Players can attack monsters and "Darknests" that periodically appear on the kingdom map in order to claim resources from them. In addition to the usual attacks, players can participate in contests, the purpose of which is to capture a location on the map, earning bonuses either for themselves or the guild that they are a part of.

View of battlefield (attack of enemy's base)

The game also has several additional gameplay modes:

- Hero Stage - PvE-mode; the player fights through a series of challenges using unique Heroes. Completing the stages can earn the player new Heroes, Hero experience, and materials for Hero equipment.
- Colosseum - PvP-mode; the player selects up to five Heroes and fights against another player's preselected Heroes. Victories result in Hero experience and a higher position on the Colosseum ranking. The game's premium currency, Gems, are awarded to players based on their rank.
- The Labyrinth - PvE-mode; the player can challenge a monster in order to claim various resources and speed-up items. On occasion, players may earn a jackpot on Gems.
- Kingdom Tycoon - PvE-mode; the player uses a luck token to roll a dice and moves forward till they reach the end of the map. The player gets different resources, items and even chests on the way and a gemming gremlin at the end where they have a chance to win the jackpot on Gems.
- Chalice Battle - a wonder PvP-mode where 40 separate districts across the 2,000+ kingdoms battle it out to gain the Paladin title.
- Feudal Battle - a wonder PvP-mode where 15 separate districts battle it out for the title of Baron.
- Battle Royal is the flagship wonder PvP-mode where 4 separate dominions battle for the title of Supreme Emperor.
- More than a dozen events recur on a 3-week schedule, with few events, such as Guild Bash and Guild Showdown recurring every 4 weeks, and Battle Royal recurs every 6 weeks.

Attacks and defenses in the game require developed tactical and strategic thinking. The player must not only know which heroes to take into battle, what equipment to wear but also be able to make quick decisions that are correlated with the current situation. Capturing locations (e.g. Wonders) requires in many respects the coordinated action of several players of one guild.

Guilds

Players can join or create guilds in order to collaborate with other players regardless of location. Guildmates are able to assist their allies with build time and research time. They can also earn rewards for their allies by defeating kingdom monsters and making in-game purchases. Each guild has a leader (Rank 5) who can assign the ranking and positions of the guild members. Guilds will have Rank 4s whose duties vary depending on the guild, but typically involve deleting guild fest quests and allowing a member's alternative account in and out of the guild. The rank of leaders are Rank 5 (highest) to Rank 1 (lowest).

Guild Fest

Guild Fest is a recurring event that takes place shortly after Kingdom versus Kingdom (KvK). During the week-long event, players select various quests to complete ranging from gathering resources off from tiles, gaining several 19+ level essences from darknests (this should only be selected if they are a T3 player with no chance of ever being able to actually help win the nest), training troops, and completing Hell Events. Ultimately, the guild will be awarded prizes for their participation in Guild Fest. However, the monetary value of these free rewards does not correlate to the amount of money players likely had to spend in order to achieve their minimum required score.

Characters

Lords Mobile features over 50 characters known as Heroes. They are divided into three types: Strength, Dexterity, Intelligence. All Heroes are unique with different skills, attributes, designs, and backgrounds. The strategy of the game assumes the need to improve these characters and command different types of troops (infantry, ranged, cavalry, siege engine) for attacking any position and order on targets. Additional Heroes are available through in-game purchase bundles while the game's launch Heroes are all available by completing Hero Stages.

== Release and marketing ==
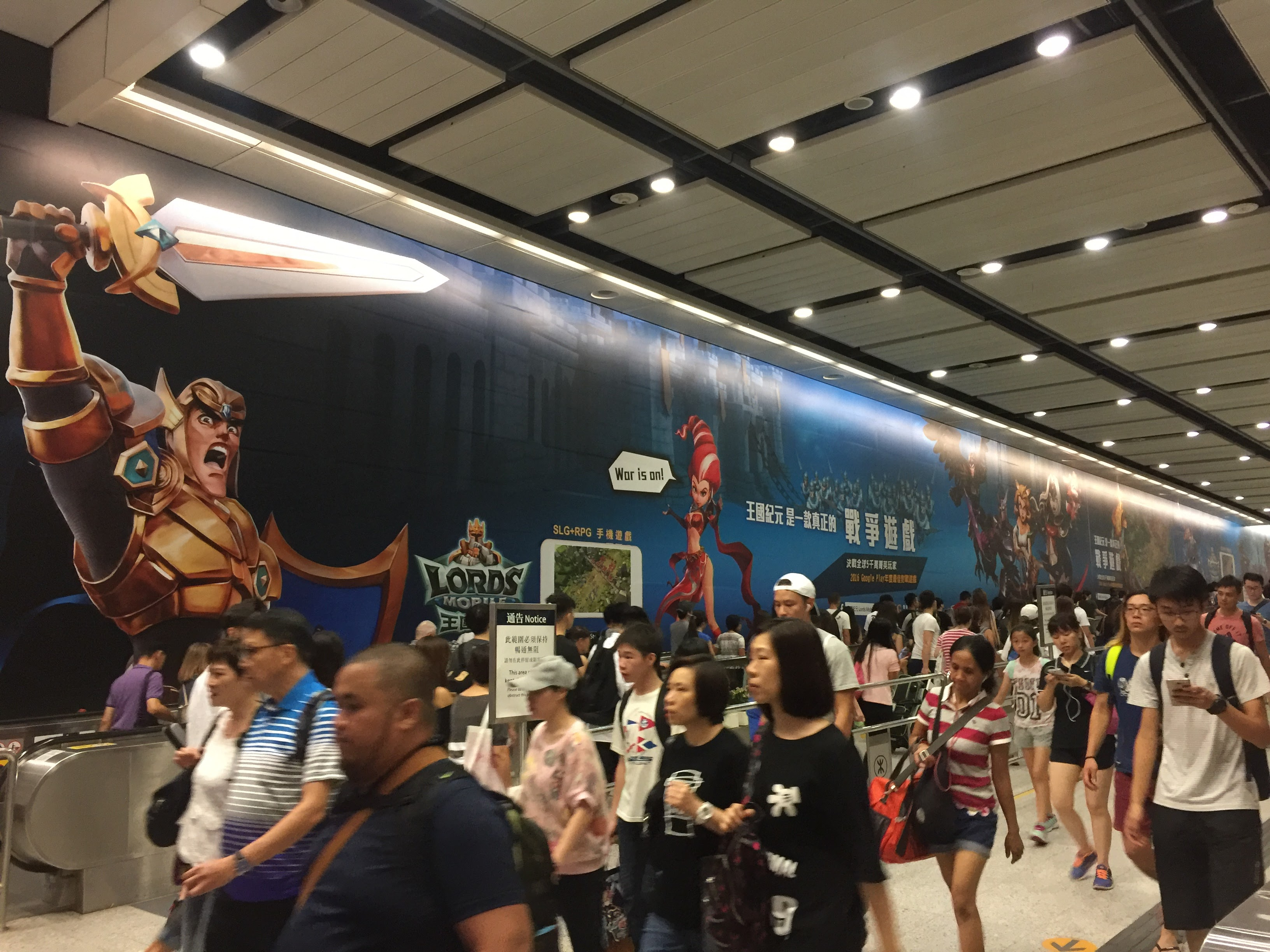
Lords Mobile banner in Hong Kong subway, 2017

The company conducts massive promotions in different parts of the world (in particular in China and South Asia): forms of marketing range widely from cooperation with a supermarket chain (Indomaret in Indonesia) to inviting famous YouTubers (f.e., Caster Wars in Thailand) and stars as representatives. The game's most notable celebrity endorsements are Taiwanese singer Jolin Tsai (Cai Yilin), Korean actress Song Ji-hyo, Japanese comedian Daisuke Miyagawa and gravure idol Rio Uchida.

== Reception ==
In his review for GameZebo, Tom Christiansen pointed out that he barely made his way through the game's introduction. ("This sort of chore is typical (though to a lesser degree) in many mobile strategy games, but Lords Mobile has taken it to an extreme"). He called the game's "saving grace" a PvE mode in which players can control Heroes in real time and launch skills. However, the rest of the gameplay seemed to him like a routine job, which he wished the developers to get rid of.

=== Awards and nominations ===
Awards
Year	Award	Category	Result
2016	Google Play Awards	Best Competitive Game	Won
2017	Google Play Awards	NONE	Nominated
2017	Google Play Awards	Android Excellence Game	Won
