= Fallout Online =

Canceled video game

- Developer(s): Interplay Entertainment; Masthead Studios
- Publisher(s): Interplay Entertainment
- Director(s): Jason D. Anderson
- Series: Fallout
- Platform(s): Microsoft Windows
- Release: Canceled
- Genre(s): Massively multiplayer online role-playing game
- Mode(s): Multiplayer

Fallout Online was a canceled massively multiplayer online role-playing game developed by Interplay Entertainment and Masthead Studios. It was intended to be the first online game in the Fallout series before its cancellation in 2012. Little information exists about what gameplay or plot would have entailed. According to dialogue writer Mark O'Green, Fallout Online would have been set along the West Coast of the United States, in parts of Arizona, California, Nevada, Oregon, and Utah. The story would have revolved around a long series of disasters, and one storyline would have involved the player going back in time to experience moments from previous Fallout games.

The idea for an online Fallout game was envisioned by Interplay founder Brian Fargo in the late 1990s, although development would not begin for several years. Bethesda Softworks purchased the Fallout intellectual property in 2007, and allowed Interplay to work on Fallout Online with the stipulations that they needed to secure $30 million in financing, begin development by April 2009, and release the game within four years of commencement. This contract led to a lengthy legal battle between the two companies. Bethesda sued Interplay for trademark infringement, multiple counts of breach of contract, and unfair competition. Interplay was $2.54 million in debt, and little work had been made on the game, even after they entered a partnership with Masthead. The two companies reached an out of court settlement in 2012, which resulted in the cancellation of Fallout Online. Bethesda released their own online Fallout game, Fallout 76, in 2018.

== Premise ==
One of the few known screenshots of Fallout Online, which was leaked during the 2011 trial between Bethesda and Interplay

Little information exists about what the gameplay or plot of Fallout Online would have entailed. According to dialogue writer Mark O'Green, Fallout Online would have been set along the West Coast of the United States, in parts of Arizona, California, Nevada, Oregon, and Utah. At the beginning of the game, an event would occur that would initiate a long series of disasters, such as volcanos, tsunamis, and a deadly virus called the Forced Evolutionary Virus. O'Green said the disasters were intended to provide new storylines, and showcase that the world was still chaotic centuries after the series' inciting nuclear war. One of the planned storylines centered around nuclear test sites in Nevada, and would have involved the player going back in time to experience moments from previous Fallout games. One character that would have returned was the Master from the original Fallout, although O'Green does not remember how it would have happened.

The gameplay would have likely included elements from massively multiplayer online role-playing games and third-person shooter games. Players could choose different character classes, such as human, ghoul, or super mutant. According to a Fallout Online newsletter, the ghoul class would have specialized in engineering and trade. Players could form guilds, and there were in-game stores that sold items like a handgun called the 9mm Burreyetta Model 86d or a healing item called the Chemblaster 3000 CDS. Fallout Online would have featured large quests that guilds could complete, and the first guild to complete the quest would split a reward pool. O'Green revealed that some of the enemies would have been mutant racoons and psychic children. The game's map was supposedly 65,500 square miles.

== History ==
=== Early years ===
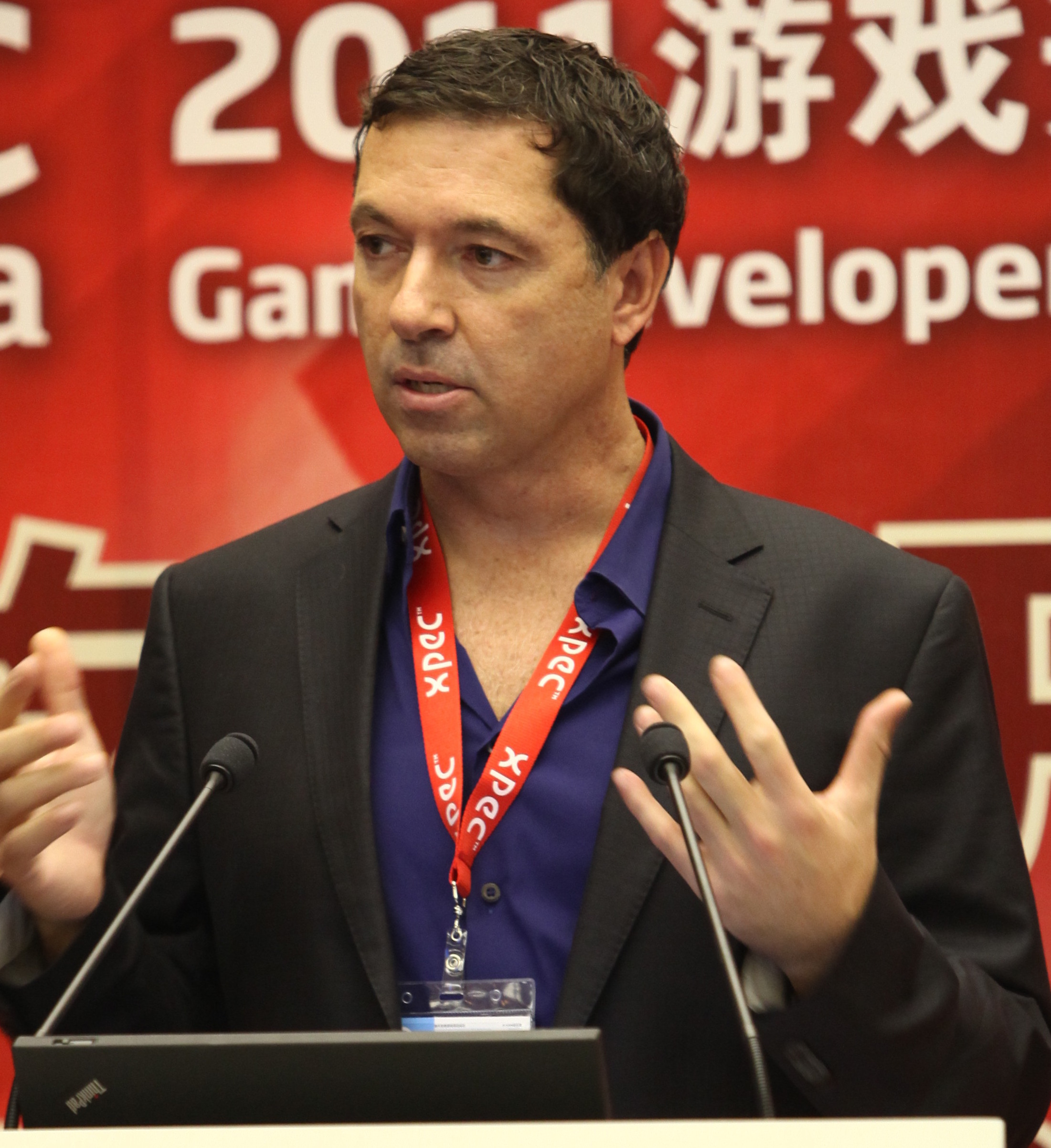
Interplay founder Brian Fargo proposed the idea of a Fallout MMO in the late 1990s.

In the late 1990s, Interplay Entertainment founder Brian Fargo saw a GameSpot poll that indicated players would like to see a Fallout massively multiplayer online game (MMO). At the time, MMOs were becoming popular, as evidenced by the success of EverQuest and Ultima Online. Fargo proposed the idea of a Fallout MMO to Feargus Urquhart of Black Isle Studios, but Urquhart rejected the proposal as he felt it did not match the style of games Black Isle made, and that Interplay lacked the resources to finance such a large project. At the time, Interplay was undergoing a period of financial hardship, an issue that would persist for several years. Journalist Kat Bailey credits their struggles to the increased cost for game development, and the industry shift toward console gaming in the late 1990s. When asked about the decision to suggest an MMO amidst the company's financial struggles, Fargo said, "MMOs did not cost 100 million dollars in the late Nineties, but regardless we were not in a good financial position to take advantage, so no doubt the timing was bad."

After Urquhart's rejection, Fargo proposed the idea to Engage, an Interplay division founded in 1996 to develop online games. Little is known about this period in Fallout Online's history, although developer Tim Cain remembers warning members of Engage that it might not be a good idea to make a multiplayer game in a series defined by its single-player games. He also noted that Fallout Online would have the unfortunate acronym of F.O.O.L. As Interplay's financial struggles worsened, the company was acquired by Titus Interactive in 1999. Fargo left the following year, due to disagreements with new owners Hervé and Eric Caen. (Note: According to GamesTM, the Australian studio Micro Forté was contracted to develop a Fallout MMO sometime after Fargo's departure, although the project went nowhere.) Interplay's finances became so dire, that in June 2004 operations were suspended by the California Department of Industrial Relations due to a lack of workers' compensation and unpaid wages. Despite these issues, Hervé Caen announced Interplay's intentions of developing MMOs, among them a Fallout MMO.

=== Deals with Bethesda ===
In October 2004, Interplay sold Bethesda Softworks the rights to develop Fallout 3 and two potential sequels, for $1,175,000 minimum guaranteed advance against royalties. Interplay retained the rights to develop a Fallout MMO. After Bethesda's acquisition, there were no updates on the game until December 2006, when Interplay submitted an filing to the United States Securities and Exchange Commission (SEC) about the proposed sale of the company's stock on Euronext exchanges. The filing shed light on the game's development, such as an estimated budget of $75 million, and an expected release date in July 2010. Interplay projected one million subscribers with its first year of release, and $160 million in revenue per year starting in its second year. By this point, Interplay had not released a game in two years.

Bethesda purchased the Fallout intellectual property (IP) outright in April 2007 for $5,750,000. As part of the deal, Interplay would keep the rights to the Fallout MMO, with stipulations. According to the contract, Interplay would need to secure $30 million in financing, begin development by April 2009, and release the game within four years of commencement. Interplay originally attempted to sell the IP for $50 million with the inclusion of the MMO, although Bethesda opted to purchase everything other than the MMO. Eric Caen claimed that Bethesda had little confidence in Interplay's ability to uphold their contractual obligations, and were waiting for the rights to the MMO to default. This claim was strengthened when Bethesda holding company ZeniMax Media founded ZeniMax Online Studios, a studio dedicated to the development of MMOs, the same year.

=== Initial development ===
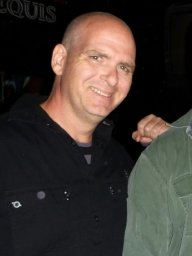
Jason D. Anderson served as the game's lead director, but left in 2009 due to his frustrations with Bethesda.

Interplay began pre-production in November 2007, and hired Jason D. Anderson as lead director. At the time, the game's codename was Project V13, a reference to Vault 13 from the original Fallout. Anderson had worked on the original Fallout, and wanted Project V13 to closely resemble that game's tone. He also wanted the graphics to mimic the art style of comics like Hard Boiled, which was envisioned for the original Fallout but never followed up on due to technical limitations. Artist Caleb Cleveland noted that early concept art revolved around expansive retrofuturistic environments. According to Cleveland, "[Anderson] wanted to create individual skylines for metropolitan areas so you would emerge from a tunnel, and you would go, 'Oh, this is nuked New York,' and there would be this giant crater you’d have to navigate. Radio City Music Hall would be a quarter mile high — it would be gigantic ... There would be monorail tubes everywhere, just to make it look as '50s and crazy as possible."

Anderson stated that Project V13's development was hampered by Bethesda's refusal to approve any design documents, which was a contract stipulation. According to Anderson, "They would ignore our requests and not respond at all. It felt to me that they had no intention of allowing the game to go forward." Frustrated by the lack of work being made on the project, Anderson left for a job with inXile Entertainment in March 2009. On April 3, just two days before their contractual deadline to begin full-scale development, Interplay announced a partnership with the Bulgarian company Masthead Studios. As per their partnership, the two studios would work together to develop Project V13, and Interplay would be given access to the game engine Masthead was using for their upcoming game Earthrise.

=== Legal battle and cancellation ===
Bethesda did not believe Interplay had begun full scale development before the deadline or secured the necessary funding, and submitted a notice of their intent to reclaim the rights to the project. In September 2009, Bethesda filed a lawsuit against Interplay in the United States District Court for the District of Maryland. They accused Interplay of trademark infringement, multiple counts of breach of contract, and unfair competition, and sought a preliminary and permanent injunction against Interplay's distribution of the first three Fallout games as well as production on Project V13. As part of their suit, Bethesda used an SEC filing from June 30 that showed that Interplay was $2.54 million in debt with only $16,000 in cash assets. Interplay countersued, and claimed Bethesda had violated the terms of the trademark licensing agreement and asset purchase agreement stated in the 2007 contract, and had acted in bad faith in its dealings with business partners. Interplay sought a declaration to retain the rights to Project V13 or return the rights to the entire series. The District Court judge denied Bethesda's preliminary injunction, and Interplay was allowed to continue work.

In June 2010, Interplay announced that Project V13 would be officially named Fallout Online, and published a website about the game. The website included a brief teaser trailer, and a sign-up page for a beta test. In response to the news, Andy Chalk of The Escapist jokingly said, "Fallout Online is clearly going to be the best MMOG ever, towering over even World of Warcraft. How do I know this? Because the only way the game could even exist at this point is through some pretty determined divine intervention."

After the website was published, Bethesda amended their lawsuit against Interplay, claiming the company was only given the rights to use the name Fallout, but not any material associated with the Fallout series. Interplay described the lawsuit as "absurd", and amended their countersuit by claiming Bethesda had attempted to cancel the 2007 contract. Bethesda's amended lawsuit and temporary restraining order against Masthead were denied by a judge in the United States District Court for the Central District of California, who stated, "Indeed, [Bethesda] was aware as early as February 2011 that Masthead was potentially infringing its copyrights ... Yet, Plaintiff waited seven months to apply for ex parte relief." An appeal of the ruling was also denied.

The lengthy legal battle ended in January 2012, when the two companies reached an out of court settlement. As per the settlement, Fallout Online was canceled, and the rights to develop a Fallout MMO would revert to Bethesda. Each company would pay their litigation costs, and Bethesda would pay Interplay $2 million. Interplay would be allowed to sell copies of Fallout, Fallout 2, and Fallout Tactics: Brotherhood of Steel until December 31, 2013. Interplay briefly attempted to repurpose the Fallout Online assets into a single-player game, but a crowdfunding effort only raised a few thousand dollars, and the new game was also canceled. Bethesda released their own online Fallout game, Fallout 76, in 2018.
