= Crossfire (1992 video game) =

1992 open source video game

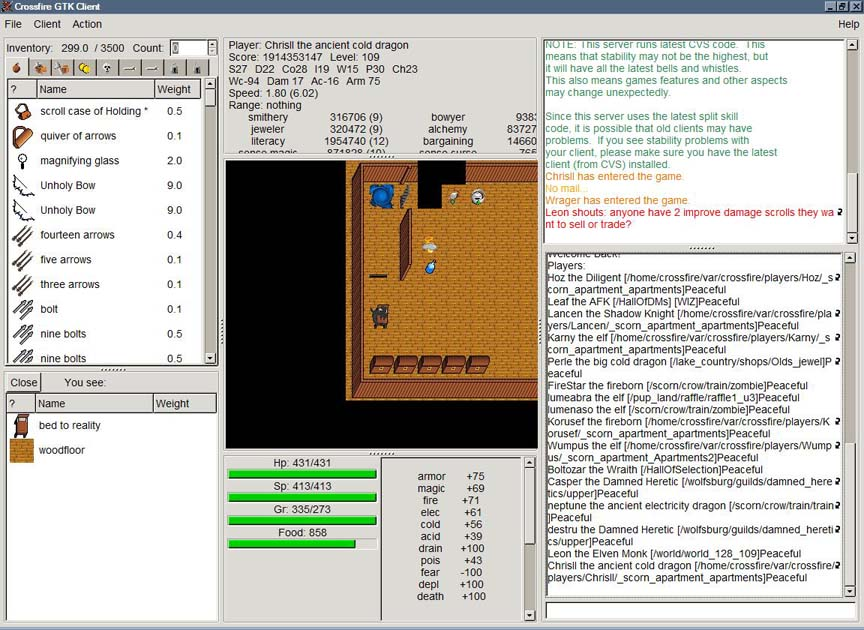
- Crossfire Client 1.7.0
- Original author: Frank Tore Johansen
- Developer: Community
- Release: 1992; 34 years ago
- Stable release: 1.75.0 / 13 January 2021; 5 years ago
- Platform: Cross-platform
- Type: Multiplayer Role-playing video game
- License: GPL-2.0-or-later
- Website: crossfire.real-time.com.
- Repository: Crossfire on SourceForge

Crossfire is a free and open source software cross-platform multiplayer online role-playing video game. Crossfire features a tile based graphic system with a pseudo-isometric perspective. All content is licensed under the GNU GPL-2.0-or-later. The client and server will run in Microsoft Windows, Mac OS X, Linux, IRIX, and an array of other platforms.

== Description ==
Crossfire is a multi-player online role-playing game; it can be described as a cross-over of the ideas of Nethack, Ultima and Gauntlet.

== Development history ==
Crossfire's development history started in mid-1992. It originally started as a Gauntlet clone developed by Frank Tore Johansen at the University of Oslo in Norway. After a name change in that same year and brief hosting time at University of California, Berkeley (Jul-1999 to Jan-2001), the project now resides at SourceForge where development continues.

Crossfire started with just one indoor map and then increased to 4 indoor maps with one-way portals from level 1 to level 4. Upon clearing the last level, there was nothing more for the player to do. Spells were limited to magic bullet (the first spell), fireball, magic missile, burning hands and lightning bolt. Later, when two-way portals were implemented, development and content contribution expanded greatly.

Crossfire has since grown to encompass over 150 monsters, about 3000 maps to explore, an elaborate magic system, 13 races, 15 character classes, a system of skills, and many artifacts and treasures.

As of July 2018 the game is under active development by the community.

== Gameplay ==
Any number of players can connect and play on the public servers, finding and using items and battling monsters. They can cooperate or compete in the same world which includes both static and randomly generated content. It is a client and server based game with the ability to be played over the Internet, on a local network setting, or on a single computer setup.

Crossfire is based in a medieval fantasy world. Players can choose any of 13 races from dragons (fire hatchlings) to quetzalcoatl as well as the more average human and elf. They can also play as one of 15 classes or professions which range from alchemist to a monk to a warrior. The game has a comprehensive skill system that attributes experience points to each skill, instead of the character earning general experience points.

Once the character creation process is complete, players enter the game world and pick from the two starting towns, Scorn or Navar. Although there are many quests, the game leans towards hack and slash adventuring with other players. The game world is quite large, making exploration a key gameplay mechanic.

== Influence on other online games ==
Crossfire was used as the base of a number of commercial and free MMORPGs, such as Wyvern, a Java rewrite, Graal Kingdoms, which closed its code and content, and Daimonin, which only used the server code but features an isometric view and a different project philosophy focused on a single main server. Deliantra is another fork of the Crossfire project, primarily aiming to improve the quality of its code and in-game content.

== Reception ==
In 1999 Crossfire was featured by Linux Journal. The game was downloaded over 550,000 times from SourceForge.net between 2000 and April 2020.

== See also ==
- List of open source games
