= Phoenix Dynasty Online =

2007 video game

- Developer: Object Software Limited
- Publishers: Ingle Games Ltd (North America), Vinagame (Vietnam)
- Platform: Microsoft Windows
- Release: Closed Beta on Aug 1st 2007; Open Beta began on Oct 9 2007
- Genre: Fantasy MMORPG
- Mode: MMO

Phoenix Dynasty Online (Chinese: 凤舞天骄, commonly abbreviated as PDO) was a fantasy MMORPG developed by Object Software Limited. It was first released in Mainland China in 2006. And then Ingle Games Ltd., the North American Publisher of Phoenix Dynasty Online, announced its Closed Beta on Aug 1st. The Open Beta test began on Oct 9, 2007. It was soon recognized by IGN and released its vault and granted IGN an interview. Until now the game is still under development and new contents have been added continuously. The upcoming 7400 expansion pack is scheduled for July 2009. Phoenix Dynasty Online is set in ancient China. Players can learn and practice the Chinese Kungfu to advance their character and rule the dynasty.

== Gameplay ==
=== Classes ===
The game features four different classes: Wizard, Assassin, Paladin, Priest, all with different sets of skills and abilities.

=== Crafting System ===
Players can choose to learn one of the four crafting skills: Blacksmithing (creates weapons), armor crafting (creates armor and boots), leather crafting (creates helmets and gauntlets), and Jewel crafting (creates necklaces and rings). The materials for crafting can be obtained by killing non-humanoid monsters. Players can also earn gold by providing crafting service to others from setting a crafting booth.

=== Mount System ===
The mount system allows players to ride a beast mount as a means of fast transportation and also provide instant buffs. Available mounts are horses, which can be bought from Horse Breeder by gold, and other beast mounts, such as bears, bulls, tigers, tortoises, quad-horns and Phoenix. There are rare mounts obtained by consuming contribution points that can be gained through Guild War.

=== Guild System ===
Players can create their own guilds by paying 100,000 gold to the guild officer. Guild leaders can assign titles and jobs to the guild members. They can use guild bulletin to deliver their message to all members. And the guild leadership can be transferred to the guild member. There are daily guild collection quests available for players to obtain contribution points.

=== Guild War ===
The guild war takes place in an area called "Bayer Tribes". There are 9 cities in this area and all of them can be occupied by guilds. All nine cities can be occupied by armed forces. Initially the cities have only a few wandering soldiers of the Bayer Tribes. After destroying the city symbol, players can occupy the city. Other guilds will challenge the guild that captures the cities at a designated time each week. The winner of the battle will then be allowed to occupy the city for a week.

=== Artifact System ===
Artifact System is newly introduced in the game's latest content expansion, Rise of Kingjow. Artifacts are rumored to be the legacies of Chinese ancient champions, and in the game they grant player characters impressive power, improving one of character attributes, including attack rate, attack force (AP), health point, mana point, defense, dodge rate and critical hitting rate.

=== Item Formula ===
The item formula is a fantastic addition to the current crafting experience. Using the item formula, player characters stand a chance of forging gears with more powerful attributes. There are two way of getting an item formula: 1. Dismantle equipment at Doctor of Sun City. 2. Loot from mobs.

=== Quests ===
The game provides over 100 quests that simulate the events which happened in the old Chinese Zhou dynasty's four States (Zhao, Chu, Chi, Qin), Players must beat furious monsters, historical beasts, princes and kings to receive valuable rewards.

=== Marriage System ===
Phoenix Dynasty Online has a romantic marriage system. The couples will wear the traditional Chinese wedding costumes and be teleported to the specially designed wedding hall after completing the marriage quest. They can also invite their friends to their wedding ceremony. An announcement of the wedding will be made to all players in the server through system message. After that, both players will have a wife/husband title and enjoy a 5% EXP. bonus when both are online.

== See also ==
- List of free MMOGs
