= Vikings: War of Clans =

2015 video game

- Developer: Plarium
- Publisher: Plarium
- Platforms: Browser, iOS, Android
- Release: iOS, Android: WW: August 10, 2015; Amazon: WW: December 10, 2015; Facebook: WW: October 19, 2016; Browser: WW: January 15, 2017
- Genres: Strategy, massively multiplayer online game
- Mode: Multiplayer

Vikings: War of Clans is a strategy massively multiplayer online game developed and published by Plarium. The game is free-to-play though certain features are available for players to buy.

The game was launched on Google Play and the iOS App Store on August 10, 2015 and on Amazon Appstore on December 10, 2015. On October 19, 2016, the desktop version of the game was released on Facebook, and on January 15, 2017, the browser version of the game appeared on the company’s official portal.

== Gameplay ==
In Vikings: War of Clans, players have to cooperate with each other to create their own clan. Each clan has a ruling hierarchy from a ranker to the chief, and each player has their corresponding authority extent.

The main game goal is to capture the place of power – a unique location placed at the center of every kingdom. Players create and develop their own clans, train troops, and upgrade their heroes and their towns. Each in-game upgrade requires special resources – lumber, iron, food, stone, silver, or the in-game currency "gold". Resources can be obtained via upgrading resource buildings in the town, undertaking marches to resource locations on the global map, and attacking towns of other players.

New competitions have been implemented into the game, which allows you to fight and become the king of the entire land. Players have to travel to the kingdom of Jotunheim to compete in the legendary competition.

Players can team up into groups that can contain up to 100-125 persons (depending on the strength of the clan and their stronghold) united by a single clan name, shield, regulations, and management structure. Players create clans to achieve collective goals such as capturing the Place of Power, taking part in clan competitions and helping clan members to develop.

Players in the game are geographically separated into different game locations – the kingdoms. On average, in each kingdom, there can be around 45,000 players. By the end of 2019, there were 845 kingdoms.

In creating the game, the development team used information from articles and books about the Scandinavian Peninsula's history, and from television shows and movies depicting war marches and the day-to-day life of the Vikings, as well as other sources containing info on early medieval Scandinavia.

== Reception ==
Vikings: War of Clans

Review scores
Publication	Score
GameRanks	77/100
MMO & MMORPG Games	6.3/10
Browsergames.de	4/5
MMO Reviews	8.5/10
Gaming Cypher	8/10

Paul Glader, associate professor of journalism at Berlin School of Creative Leadership, wrote about his experience of a Summer spent ruling a clan in Vikings: War of Clans, summarising "I enjoyed my Summer as a Viking chief. I learned that many of the principles of good leadership in real life apply in these virtual realms. Good leadership in either realm takes time, thought and engagement. It also takes a team. And, sometimes, when you find yourself less engaged as a leader, it's time to make a succession plan or a new leadership plan. Because that’s when your Viking clan might face its greatest test."
