= Tales of Pirates =

2007 massively multiplayer online role-playing video game

Tales Of Pirates
- Tales of Pirates Logo
- Developer: MOLI
- Publisher: I Got Games
- Platform: Windows
- Release: (Closed Beta) March 15, 2007 (Open Beta) March 29, 2007 (Global) March 24, 2008
- Genre: Fantasy massively multiplayer online role-playing game
- Mode: MMORPG

Tales of Pirates (also 海盗王 Pirate King Online or King of Pirates Online in China) was a 3D massively multiplayer online role-playing video game developed by the Chinese company MOLI (Chinese: 摩力游) and published by IGG. The game takes place in a pirate-like environment with a top-view camera and takes inspiration cues from manga series like One Piece. In 2011, IGG released a direct sequel called Tales of Pirates 2, letting users migrate their characters from the previous game. Tales of Pirates 2 subsequently closed on February 29, 2016.

== Gameplay ==
Tales of Pirates features an isometric top-down perspective, allowing players to navigate a vibrant, colorful environment filled with exaggerated character animations and a relaxed atmosphere. Players begin by selecting one of four distinct characters—Lance, Carsise, Phyllis, or Ami—each with unique backstories and visual designs. These characters serve as the foundation for progression, with customization options available for appearance and later class specialization.

Upon starting, players undertake beginner quests in one of three initial areas (Argent, Shaitan, Icicle), progressing through a mix of storyline missions and character-specific tasks. At level 15, players gain the ability to purchase and captain ships, unlocking access to maritime exploration and combat. This introduces new gameplay elements, such as naval battles, where players can engage enemies on the high seas.

Class progression is a core mechanic, with players choosing from four primary classes—Swordsman, Explorer, Hunter, or Herbalist—after initial leveling. These later branch into advanced classes, such as Crusader, Champion, Sharpshooter, Voyager, Cleric, or Seal Master, each offering specialized skills and playstyles. For example, Swordsmen can evolve into heavily armored Crusaders or Champions, while Explorers may become seafaring Voyagers. This system ties character choice to specific class paths, limiting some options based on the initial selection (e.g., Lance cannot become a Herbalist).

The game emphasizes multiplayer engagement through features like guild-based PvP (player versus player) combat and world boss encounters. Instanced PvP supports small-scale battles, ranging from 1v1 duels to 5v5 group fights, while larger conflicts occur in areas like Demonic World or dungeons, pitting guilds or parties against each other. Cooperative play is further supported by crafting and trading systems, with an item mall available for optional purchases, reflecting the game’s free-to-play model.

Tales of Pirates also incorporates a pet system, where fairies serve as companions that assist players in various tasks, enhancing both utility and personalization. The game’s progression culminates in endgame activities focused on acquiring powerful equipment and competing in PvP, with treasure maps and island battles adding strategic depth.

== Discontinuation ==
On January 25, 2016, IGG announced they would discontinue their latest iteration of the game, Tales of Pirates 2. The game and its website officially closed on February 29, 2016.
