= Star Sonata =

2004 video game

- Developer: Landauer Games
- Publisher: Landauer Games
- Designers: Adam Miller, Sherman Mui, Roch Denis, Jeff Landauer, Eric Prieur, Danny Chi, Mark Elrod, Adrian Eyre
- Platform: Microsoft Windows
- Release: 2004
- Genre: MMORPG Space simulation
- Mode: Multiplayer

Star Sonata is a space-themed massively multiplayer online role-playing game (MMO) by American studio Star Sonata LLC released in 2004 that combines elements of action games and real-time strategy games such as real-time ship-to-ship combat and galactic conquest.

The game offers complex and involved commerce, construction and team systems. The goal for players in Star Sonata is to bring their team to domination and claim the seat of Emperor. Star Sonata belongs to the space opera genre established in computer gaming by Galactic Empire and Elite.

The game is free to download and play for an unlimited period of time with game-play restrictions.

== Gameplay ==
Star Sonata is a space trading game, where players explore space and trade goods from one space station to another for economic gain. Players also control automated ships through programmed command sequences in order to patrol areas, assist in combat or engage in trade of commodities even while a player is offline. At higher levels, players build custom space stations on planets and moons to extract resources. Items can be manufactured on player-controlled space stations and bought from colonies on planets with ancient ruins.

Unlike many MMORPGs, combat in Star Sonata is in real-time and requires manual aiming. This results in a wide variety of combat tactics, such as dodging to evade enemy fire, using combat aids to deploy drones, boost shields or overload weapons, and maneuvering around terrain elements such as planets and asteroids which block attacks. Star Sonata also has an open PvP system in which players can attack other players near their skill level.

=== Conquest ===
Teams of players may claim ownership of galaxies by building space stations on planets in order to control territory, exploit planetary resources and build colonies for trade and population expansion. By expanding their empires, teams compete to achieve a score in the top five with a sufficient percentage of the population of the universe, which enables them to make a claim for the Emperor's throne. If successful, their team leader will be crowned the Emperor of the Universe.

=== Universe resets ===
A unique feature of Star Sonata is that the game's universe is randomized every few months in a Universe reset. This allows for the game to remain fresh for long-time players and for new players to have a chance to claim a star system for themselves. A reset triggers economic changes as supply and demand shifts for different items and resources in the new procedurally-generated universe of star systems.

=== Character advancement ===
Character development is based on gaining levels through meeting fixed experience point requirements. Experience is earned by killing computer-controlled enemies and completing in-game missions. Players also earn skill points which can be spent on a variety of skills. Some skill sets are mutually exclusive, requiring the player to choose a particular focus for the character, such as a fighting style, space station management, or freight transport. Some other skills are also available to all players but require special commodities and/or prerequisite such as Hull Expansion.

== Development ==
Developer Adam Miller said he designed Star Sonata "out of a nostalgic childhood dream of space adventure." After three years in development and a public beta, Star Sonata was released in October 2004. Development continued from 2004 to 2011, with features and content zones being added every few months.

In a January 2008 interview, Owner Jeff Landauer stated that 12,132 unique characters had logged in to play in the last 2 days and 11 hours. Landauer has also reported that the number of paying players increased from 300 in August 2005 to 854 in July 2008.

After beta sign-ups in August 2011, Star Sonata 2 was released on November 12, 2011 with an upgraded client supporting 3D graphics and user interface improvements. In July 2012, Landauer Games announced a major increase in paid staff for continued development and additions to Star Sonata.

== Reception ==
In 2004, Star Sonata was reviewed by GameZone which gave the game an overall rating of 7.7/10, noting that the game offered "interesting options for controlling your own AI fleets and space stations." In 2005, the independent video game site Game Tunnel recommended the game for those who "enjoy exploring, conflict, and building a name for yourself" while noting that the game's PvP conflict "can badly affect new players" who are too weak to fight back. The updated Star Sonata 2, released in 2011, was one of 3 role-playing games listed on GameSpy’s 101 Free PC Games of 2012.
