= Astonia III =

Fantasy MMORPG video game

- Publisher: Intent Software
- Designer: Daniel Brockhaus
- Platform: Windows
- Release: December 31, 2001
- Genre: MMORPG
- Mode: Multiplayer

Astonia III was a fantasy MMORPG video game that was initially released in September 2001. It was developed as a solo project by German programmer Daniel Brockhaus as a sequel to his earlier project, a smaller MMORPG called Mercenaries of Astonia. At the end of the year, Astonia III launched into a full release, and started to charge players a monthly subscription fee, with one-month free trial. In late 2014, the game's official servers were shut down, and its source code was released online by Brockhaus.

== History ==
In December 1998, a programmer by the name of Daniel Brockhaus had created a small MMORPG titled Mercenaries of Astonia. It was only able to support up to 100 people at a time, and was not intended to be a commercial release; rather, it was to be a hobby project. Due to the growing popularity and Brockhaus wanting to expand, he decided to create a new game, titled Astonia III. Although servers were left online for Mercenaries of Astonia, players had started to gradually move to the new game. It supported better graphics, more gameplay elements, and an improved netcode to support hundreds of players in one server.

Alpha testing for Astonia III started on September 13, 2001. It was to help stomp out bugs and test new gameplay elements. When the year came to a close, Intent Software (the official developing and publishing entity) moved the game to a pay-to-play model, with a one month free trial period for any new accounts. The game's official servers supported numerous mirrors to allow larger crowds online.

Astonia III had steadily increased in numbers throughout 2002 and 2003. Intent Software continued to expand the game through new locations, new gameplay elements, and more in-game options. Eventually, a new server dubbed Astonia 3.5 was released, with varying reactions. Both versions of Astonia III remained online simultaneously.

In late 2014, Intent Software had shut down the official servers for Astonia III, after more than 12 years of being online. Brockhaus then released the source code for all of his previous Astonia projects, encouraging fan-made projects to be created (with restricted revenue options).

The initial revivals of Astonia III occurred in the 2010s. The first two revivals went live very shortly after the release of the source code in 2014, Astonia Resurrection and Ugaris - The Legend Recovered. They were later followed by Astonia 3 Invicta (later renamed to Astonia Invicta Online). In the 2020s, two additional revivals of Astonia III occurred on the Steam service: Astonia: The Return of Yendor (later renamed to Astonia Remastered) and Astonia Resurgence.

In early 2023, Brockhaus collaborated with community developers to update the Astonia game client, removing the DirectDraw dependency in favor of SDL2 to support resolutions up to 4K. The updated client also removed the traditional launcher GUI, but added a minimap, hotbar, and mouse-hovering UI enhancements. It was released on GitHub.

== Reception ==
In June 2002, IGN previewed the game, and had stated "Overall, the smaller online world of Astonia III has impressed me with its large amount of content, especially in the way of quests. It is one of the few online worlds I've played where the major motivation for advancing my character has been to see what the next quest will be."

Adrenaline Vault reviewed the game and gave it three-and-a-half stars out of five, and concluded that "While it may not be the prettiest title on your shelf, its gameplay doesn't disappoint in the least, providing a good amount of variety and customization."

Computer Gaming World reviewed the game much later after release, in March 2003. They gave the game three-and-a-half stars out of five, and stated "It looks like Ultima Online before Ultima Online stumbled its way into 3D graphics. It plays like Diablo before it fell into a bottomless pit of cheating." They concluded that "Astonia III shows that sometimes the old ways can be the best ways."
