= Earthrise (video game) =

2011 video game

- Developer: Masthead Studios
- Publisher: Iceberg Interactive
- Engine: Earthrise Engine
- Platform: Microsoft Windows
- Release: NA: February 4, 2011; (service closed on February 9, 2012)
- Genre: Massively multiplayer online role-playing game
- Mode: Multiplayer

Earthrise is a science fiction player vs player massively multiplayer online role-playing game (MMORPG) by independent Bulgarian developer Masthead Studios released in February 2011.

The game takes place in a post-apocalyptic setting where the surviving population of the Earth has built a new society ruled by a totalitarian government while armed factions fight for resources and power within the new system. Among other features, a few of note are a skill-based advancement system, a player-driven economy and an emphasis on free PvP. The game uses the Earthrise Engine, an engine that was to be used for the cancelled Fallout Online.

Citing that the game was released "too early" and that it "did not meet the expectations of its fans", Masthead Studios shut down the Earthrise servers on February 9, 2012. A press release was sent to many of the gaming sites along with a post on the official forums giving additional details. The announcement also mentioned that the previously planned conversion to a free-to-play model is now dependent on future investor and/or publisher interest.

== Gameplay ==
=== Character progression ===
The character progression in Earthrise is conducted entirely online.

=== Skill System ===
The number 100 indicates total skills, abilities and tactics available at launch. While many of them are combat oriented, a sizable amount will cover crafting and social aspects for each character. The three types of game elements – skills, abilities and tactics, are closely related to each other and will allow for numerous possibilities for customization of the character. Tactics are the key to customization – these meta-enhancements will be compatible with wide variety of abilities and will change their effects to suit player's style of play. Players with similar skills may have a completely different style of fighting thanks to enhancing them with tactics.

=== Combat ===
The outcome of battle in Earthrise will rely more on the traditional RPG system, where avatar skills and equipment are important. However the combat will be more dynamic, resembling a third person shooter. The game will require a certain level of player skill in movement and targeting that is becoming increasingly popular trend in current wave of MMOs. Still, not every action will have the same requirements. Some actions will require proper targeting of the opponent, while others will require only having it in sight and then there will be actions that can be executed even if the player doesn't have its target in sight but within range.

=== PvP ===
Close combat vs ranged weapons, introduced by Earthrise's gameplay video

Players will have the opportunity to kill other players (including from his faction) – but not without consequences. Killing people of the same faction is one of the worst crimes, prosecuted by members of both Noir and Continoma. It will be very difficult for someone to clear the damning effects of such a crime, though not impossible, and his space of operation would be greatly limited in the wild, less secure areas - where he himself would taste his own medicine by being open target for other criminals. Each player's criminal actions, once reported through the Continoma SVS Network will affect the behavior of every guard the player encounters. There will be cases when despite guard activity, the actions do not get reported island-wide. For the most prosecuted player killers that means that their life in a sizable portion of the game world will be constant game of cat and mouse, and other players will certainly benefit from joining in as there will be rewards to take a criminal down. Stealth abilities will be almost a requirement for survival. We won't force that sort of gameplay on players and it would be easy to get on good terms with the government. Player who has killed another player opponent would be able to loot his possessions. There will be available equipment protection, but its viability will vary based on character's affiliation and actions in the game. Characters who play "against the system" should learn to protect their gear well. There will be some high security areas in Earthrise, where guards will attack on sight everyone else who tries to attack another player. People, who don't want to engage in PvP will feel secure in these zones. At the same time, the most dangerous parts of the island will feature free for all PvP.
Another PvP aspect in Earthrise will be guild rivalries. Guilds will be able to declare war on each other and fight for power and resources. Such wars will be prohibited in the security zones, but will not be punished in the other territories. Guilds will be able to conquer their own part of the island, gaining access to resources and a territory where they can impose their rules. There will also be arenas and other types of PvP competitions with rewards. People who do not want to engage in PvP will not feel alienated in Earthrise. There will be certain areas in the game, where PvE skills will be more important than PvP. Quests, crafting and trade are other examples of the non-PvP gameplay in Earthrise.

=== Crafting ===
Crafting in Earthrise is a complex process that is easy to understand but ultimately difficult to master. The basic rule of crafting is that every item is made of components and every item can be broken down to its composites. Some components are used for specific items, others are used in a wide array of items – for example, a hand gun grip can be used in the creation of various hand guns, while electronic chipsets can be used to create specific devices. Players often will break down items to their components in order to combine some of them with other components to produce new, different items. Crafting and salvaging requires specific skills, depending what item is created or salvaged down, and players will have access to dozens of skills, covering mechanics, electronics, engineering, construction and programming in several futuristic industries.

Transformation of one type of item to another - either through crafting or salvaging - has damaging effect on the used resources and the final item will always have lowered quality value compared to the input components, depending on player's crafting skill. This renders impossible the infinite transformation of items - even for a true expert, constant crafting and salvaging of the same item will make the resources useless and any item made of them prone to quick damage and lessened effect. This is when items will "break" completely - when they cannot be any more repaired, or effectively salvaged to craft a new useful item.

== Critical reception ==
MMORPG.com rated the game 5.5/10 and wrote that the game was bland and uninspired, lacking a true sandbox environment and offering "little more than grinding combat and crafting" while also noting that the game suffered from performance issues. GameFront rated the game 65/100, praising the game's art direction but stated that the game offered slow progression and lacked a sizable playerbase.
