= Wonderland Online =

2005 video game

- Developer: Chinese Gamer International
- Publishers: NA: IGG Inc.; TW: Chinese Gamer Intl.
- Platforms: Microsoft Windows, iOS
- Release: TW: December 14, 2005; NA: April 9, 2008
- Genre: Massively Multiplayer Online Role-playing Game

Wonderland Online (Chinese: 飄流幻境) is a massively multiplayer online role-playing game (MMORPG) created by the Taiwanese company Chinese Gamer International. The North American version of the game was published by IGG Inc., which ran from 2008 to 2019.

The game was developed and published in Taiwan by Chinese Gamer International on December 14, 2005. The game was later published in Hong Kong on 2006 by the company 980x, and in North America by IGG Inc. (then known as Internet Gaming Gate) on 2008.

Since 2019, both Chinese Gamer International and IGG Inc. have discontinued support for the game, although 980x still operates a Chinese version titled New Wonderland Online. A mobile version of the game (which can also be played on PC), are also operated by the same company. A recent version called Wonderland Online Rhode Island opened up in September 2020 which explores new areas with new quests and new regular content, it is operated by Dragon Gamer HongKong, with a substantial English community.

== Gameplay ==
Wonderland Online is a story of a group of shipwreck survivors stranded on an isolated island. Players may perform quests, solve puzzles, manufacture items and indulge in interior decoration. The graphics are anime-style 2D. The game world is based on the real-world Earth, and includes classical representations of countries such as China, Egypt, Philippines, Korea, Japan, United Kingdom, Italy, Greece, Maya and the South Pole.

Characters have attributes and magical powers based on the four elements: defensive ability is based on earth, support abilities on water, attack abilities on fire and agility and speed on wind.

Equipment can be obtained by Alchemy, Alchemy success rate and rarity can be defined by alchemy level and tier. Tiers are divided between None, Primary, Junior, and Superior. Initial tier is None, new tiers can be unlocked by quests, each tier got a level cap, but only require 5 for primary, and 10 for junior to trigger their respective upgrade quests, and superior caps out at level 30. The higher the tier of alchemy, the rarer the items the player can make. Most of the equipment can be enhanced by either the use of forge on the item mall, which costs points and is of exponentially decreasing success chance. Or of enhancement scrolls which ranges from 50 to 100% chance, these can be obtained either through the item mall or special events.

Rebirth system is available at the version "Cursed Palace". Players above level 100 can pick a job ranging from:

- Mage Classes:
1. Wit- specializes in matk(INT)
2. Priest- specializes in mdef(WIS)
3. Seer- specializes in speed(AGI)
- Warrior Classes
1. Killer- specializes in atk(STR)
2. Warrior- specializes in def(CON)
3. Knight- specializes in speed(AGI)

this can be obtained by a two-staged quest. In which players are able to pick their job in the end. With their level being deducted by 99 of their current level before rebirth and receiving a cape in which its stats base on the level in which the player rebirth(+10 ability points at 100, +80 ability points at 198).

== Development ==
Wonderland Online was developed by Taiwanese studio Chinese Gamer International. Pre-production began in 2003 and formal development in 2004. Wonderland was published in Taiwan on December 14, 2005. Initially, players had to pay for subscription. The business model switched to free-to-play on May 16, 2006, with revenue generated by points cards redeemable at an in-game item mall. Wonderland was made available in mainland China on April 7, 2006, in Japan on December 3, 2007, and in Thailand on January 25, 2008. Finally, IGG Inc. published Wonderland Online in North America on May 12, 2008.

== Issues and Closure ==
Duping has been an issue when players found an exploit in the server code which started back in 2014 in Taurus server, which spread to other servers. Particularly Aries server back in early 2016 where most of the remaining players, specifically the mall buyers has been based when the population from the other servers declined (was fixed in 6/2017). Facilitating a merge of all clusters into the first three, namely: Aries, Taurus, and Cancer.

In the end, due to lack of updates and the license to operate the game expiring, IGG decided not to renew the contract, announcing its closure to be on January 26, 2018.

In the following days, however, IGG ended up renewing the contract once again, operating the game for another seven months before announcing its closure a second time, this time slated for January 15, 2019. Despite this, the Chinese servers for the game are still operational.

Another version of the game titled Wonderland Online: Legend of Rhode Island was released in Taiwan in September 2020, featuring various additions from the original, including Japanese voice-overs.
