= Voyage Century Online =

2006 massively multiplayer online role-playing video game

- Developer: Snail Games
- Publishers: IGG Inc. Snail Games
- Platform: Windows
- Release: December 22, 2006
- Genre: Historical MMORPG
- Mode: Multiplayer

Voyage Century Online (航海世纪/王者世紀) is a free-to-play nautical MMORPG developed by Snail Games and published by IGG. It was the first game developed by Snail after its founding in 2000. The game is set in the 16th century and features accurate historical representations of several coastal cities. Players are not required to choose a career path at the beginning of the game. This gives players a rather varied gameplay in which they can either specialize in one skill and trade for resources, or make use of all the skills.

== History ==
Prior to its English launch, Voyage Century Online was available to players in China, South Korea, and Germany. An open alpha and beta versions for English edition began in December 2006. The game's full version was released on April 8, 2007.

== Plot ==
Screenshot of Zhigu city as it appears in the game

Voyage Century Online is a game set in 16th-century Europe with its roots in the Age of Sail.

From the 15th century, western European explorers pushed eastward in an effort to seek treasures, spices and other luxuries of that time. They opened a gate to riches and greed for those in power, who sponsored explorers' cause without abandonment. As the fleets stretched their paths, westerners expanded their influences to Africa. Later they cruised around Cape of Good Hope to reach the Indian Ocean. In the other direction, they explored westward and found the New World. The late 15th century saw the start of the global expansion of Western capitalism and colonial exploitation of the rest of the world.

Voyage Century's storyline begins in the Mediterranean from the late 15th to early 16th century. The western powers started the bloody pursuit of riches that led Europe into an age of great turmoil. Every character in the game was from a mysterious birth. Some of them are descendants of the courageous cavalry in the Yuan Empire, some carry the family line of caravan merchants faring the Silk Road, some are the witnesses of the not-so-well-known affair between Marco Polo and the Chinese princess, and some are even the offspring of West Europe's pirates.

== Gameplay ==
Voyage Century Online is a third-person massively multiplayer online role-playing game (MMORPG). Character, ship and camera movements are fully controlled by a mouse, while skills can be controlled using a keyboard, through the skill shortcut bar. At the beginning of the game, players are asked to choose one of the five professions available, Royal Military Officer, Imperial Guardian, Caribbean Pirate, Treasure Hunter or Armed Businessman. Professions can be leveled, up to level 180, by gaining experience points from performing various tasks in the game, e.g. crafting, fighting animals, and completing quests. Leveling a profession is beneficial as new professional skills are unlocked with every new level. Each profession has its own unique skill set and role it plays in the game. Professions can be changed at any point which gives players a rather varied gameplay. In addition to professions, there are four different weapons available, axe, sword, falchion and gun. Players are not required to choose any specific weapon, but certain professions will benefit from certain weapons, e.g. Treasure Hunter is specialized in using guns and will do more damage fighting with a gun.

The game features many different systems of which the most noted ones are the skill system, exploration system, trading system, rank system, refining system and upgrading system.

=== Skill system ===
Every character has 17 different skills available for leveling, ranging from fighting skills to collection and production skills. Skills are leveled by performing various tasks (e.g. fighting animals, sewing, mining) and gaining experience points from them. Skills are essential to players' progress in-game as they have many uses in-game, of which the most noted ones are crafting equipment and collecting materials. Most importantly they are required for sailing various ships and using various equipment.

=== Exploration system ===
Exploration system is a unique system which keeps track of players' exploration progress. Through exploring different areas of the game, players earn points which can be used to take various rewards from the exploration system. Points are mostly gained by killing animals, sinking ships, authenticating plants and minerals, and finishing various quests throughout the world.

=== Trading system ===
The trading system gives players the ability to purchase goods (commodities) from one city and sell them in another city. Every city and colony has its own supply and demand. Having higher amity with countries, grants the ability to purchase goods at lower prices resulting in more profit. Goods can be traded freely between cities for a huge profit and experience. Having goods on the ship whilst sailing on the high seas attracts the attention of pirate NPC ships. Players are able to team up, creating huge trading fleets, allowing them to combat pirates more efficiently.

=== Rank system ===
There are 2 ranks available in the game, noble rank and honored officer rank. Noble rank is acquired by gaining reputation. Reputation can be acquired in many ways, some of them being authenticating treasures, discovering animals, sinking ships and finishing quests. Honored Officer rank is acquired by gaining contribution points. Contribution points are gained by participating in Petro Fortress and Labrinton Coast battlegrounds, PvP events with capture the flag-style gameplay. Ranks are required by various equipment, following the common rule: the higher the equipment level, the higher the rank that is required to equip them.

=== Refining system ===
Equipment found in the game can be refined through the refining system to add different bonuses on them. Items used to refine equipment, called refining items in-game, can be found either in-game in various instances or in item mall by purchasing them.

=== Upgrading system ===
The upgrading system is used to upgrade equipment to a higher level. Unlike crafting, upgrading equipment allows players to keep bonuses which they added through the refining system.

=== PVE ===
Voyage Century features 22 different PvE instances, areas that will generate a new copy of the location for each team of players that enters the area. This ensures that different teams are able to interact with an area privately, without interference from other teams. Teams can contain up to 5 players. Instances are divided into two main categories, land- and sea-based. There are 6 sea and 16 land instances available in total. Instances contain special monsters and ships with valuable drops. Most of the items required for refining and upgrading equipment are found exclusively in these areas. Beside instances, almost all cities have suburban areas with various vicious animals ready to attack. In addition, the game features historically famous pirates like Hayreddin Barbarossa, William Dampier, John Hawkins and others.

=== PVP ===
Voyage Century has a restrictive PvP system. Players are able to experience PvP in certain areas like suburbs, offshores, islands and dungeons. Players are not allowed to experience PvP in city residential areas and ports. Attacking another player will result in gaining notoriety points. Notorious players are marked with red names and will be hunted by guards and patrol ships. Notoriety will also result in dropping items from the player's inventory should the player die. Notoriety can be removed by going to jail or by using special items. In addition to regular PvP, there are special events like guild wars, siege wars and battlegrounds. Killing players during these events will not result in gaining notoriety.

Guild wars are guild PvP battles in a specifically designed enclosed area away from other players. They feature last man standing-style gameplay. Players start fighting in a sea scene allowing them to launch massive sea attacks on their opponents. If the attacking team manages to sink all players from the defending team, the fight will move on the land. The last guild with an active land player wins. Should the defenders sink all players from the attacking team, the land fighting part is skipped and defenders are automatically declared victorious. Winning guilds will gain a small amount of guild funds and points, as opposite of losing guilds which will lose a small amount guild funds and points. Unlike siege wars, in guild wars, guilds will be aided by guild defense towers, NPC ships and soldiers.

Siege wars are massive PvP events which happen once a week. Guilds are able to siege cities to claim ownership. Owning a city has many benefits, some of them being, an ability to purchase special limited items or collecting taxes from NPC traders. Guilds are allowed to invite allied guilds to aid them. Siege wars contain two main components, city's barbette and mothership. Prior to the siege, an attacking guild has to set up a mothership somewhere on the high sea. Mothership contains a flag and serves as a spawning point for the attacking team. Barbette contains a flag and serves as a spawning point for the defending team. In order to claim the ownership of the city, the attacking guild needs to destroy the flag located on top of the barbette. Should the defending guild destroy the flag located on the mothership first, the siege will end resulting in a victory for the defending team.

Battlegrounds are small PvP-based events with capture the flag-style gameplay in which two teams fight for four flags located on various points on the map.

== Expansions ==
Since the first release, the game has received 12 major expansions.

=== Doom Treasure ===
Released on November 30, 2007, it was the first major expansion. It has introduced the first instance (Hurricane Island Instance), refining system and first refining items along with other small changes.

=== Colony Age ===
Released on June 24, 2008, it was the second major expansion. It has introduced guild built cities, new level 11 ships, new equipment, AFK system, new pirate bosses along with other small changes.

=== New Era of Conquest ===
Released on February 24, 2009, it was the third major expansion. It has introduced professions, 6 new instances (Crete Maze, Mallorca, Madagascar, Taj Mahal, Imperial Tomb and Mayan Forest), new profession-based equipment (level 1 to 120 land and sea), the American continent including 6 new cities (Seward, San Francisco, Cruz, Salinas, San Diego and Magellan Outpost) along with other small changes.

=== March to Glory ===
Released on August 4, 2009, it was the fourth major expansion. It has introduced 2 new instances (Elite Mayan, Elite Hurricane Island), wedding system, new pet system with 4 new pets, along with other small updates.

=== Atlantis ===
Released on March 1, 2010, it was the fifth major expansion. It has introduced 2 new islands (Bimini and North Island), 1 new sea instance (Maltese Coast), 4 new land instances (Polar Tundra and King's Tomb, both ordinary and elite versions), new profession-based equipment (level 130 to level 150 land and sea sets), Atlantis and North Island exploration systems along with other small changes.

=== Harbor Blockade ===
Released on June 27, 2011, it was the sixth major expansion. It has introduced 1 new sea instance (English Channel), level 13 ships along with other small changes.

=== The Gate to the Poseidon Temple ===
Released on December 14, 2011, it was the seventh major expansion. It has introduced a brand-new redesigned guild system, 2 new land instances (Poseidon's Temple and Parlo Valley), binding system along with other small changes.

=== The Pirate King's Treasures ===
Released on May 9, 2012, it was the eight major expansion. It has introduced 3 new sea instances (Cretan Pirates, Gibraltar Straits and North Sea), 1 new land instance (Portobello City), new Portobello exploration system and new profession-based equipment (Salvation, Fallen and Inquisitor land sets) along with other small changes.

=== Hurricane Island Mystery ===
Released on February 12, 2014, it was the ninth major expansion. It has introduced 2 new cities (Jamestown and New Amsterdam), new sea instance (Portobello Bay), new land instance (Battled Forrest), new profession-based equipment (level 155, level 160 land sets, and Sidonia, Hatred sea sets), 3 new exploration systems (World Ocean, Storm Voyage and Hurricane Mystery), level 14 ships along with other small changes.

=== The Cretan Renaissance ===
Released on March 29, 2016, it was the tenth major expansion. It has introduced a Generals system, new PvP events (Crete Siege and The Strife of Europe), level 15 ships along with other small changes.

=== The Defense of Yizhou ===
Released on June 6, 2017, it was the eleventh major expansion. It has introduced Yizhou land and sea instances, level 165, 168, 170 and 170.1 land gears, profession level cap has been increased to 170, gear promoting and upgrading system, along with other small changes.

=== The Epic Of Jiawu ===
Released on November 19, 2018, it was the twelfth major expansion. It has introduced Jiawu Bay sea instance, level 160, 165, 170 sea gear, a new equipment piece called Flag, some profession skill trees were rebalanced, along with other small changes.

== Other distributions ==
The game is available in other languages. Snail Games has licensed a number of companies for distribution of localized versions. Some of them being:

- Chinese distribution of the game that goes under the name of 航海世纪 (Voyage Century), which is published by the original developer, Snail Games.
- European (English, German and French servers) distribution of the game that goes under the name of Bounty Bay Online, which was originally published by Frogster and later taken by Snail USA. Servers were officially stopped in September 2012 after which all characters were saved and transferred to new servers run by Snail USA.
- Russian distribution that goes under the name of Онлайн игра Пираты (Pirates Online), which was originally published by Netville and later taken by Snail RU. Servers were officially stopped in September 2015 after which all characters were saved and transferred to new servers run by Snail RU.
- Spanish and Portuguese distribution of the game that went under the name of Magnífica Aventura (Magnificent Adventure) which was published by Vibrant Communications Limited. This version was closed in November 2013.
- Turkish distribution of the game that went under the name of Kara İnci Online (Black Pearl) which was published by Gameturk. This version closed in mid 2013.
