= Earthrise (1990 video game) =

- Developer: Interstel
- Publisher: Interstel
- Platform: MS-DOS
- Release: NA: 1990
- Genre: Adventure
- Mode: Single-player

Earthrise, also known as Earthrise: A Guild Investigation, is an adventure game designed and programmed by Matt Gruson and published for MS-DOS in 1990 by Interstel. The player assumes the role of an astronaut sent to an asteroid base to investigate why it has ceased communication. It uses a combination of a text-based interface with EGA graphics.

== Gameplay ==
A sci-fi adventure in which the player attempts to save Earth from a collision with a mechanically controlled asteroid. Space travel and exploration of the deserted mining colony.

== Reception ==
Computer Gaming World reviewed Earthrise as "a clean, simple game with logically-constructed puzzles and a humorous touch". They rated the graphics as unspectacular and criticized the game's text parser as more trial-and-error in certain scenarios.
