= Guns and Robots =

2014 video game

- Developer: Masthead Studios
- Engine: Unity
- Platform: Microsoft Windows
- Release: 4 August 2014
- Genre: Online shooter
- Mode: Multiplayer

Guns and Robots is a 2014 cartoon-style online shooter developed by Masthead Studios for Microsoft Windows. The focus on the game is construction of gunfighters and team-based gameplay.

== Gameplay ==
The gameplay of GAR is divided between two main activities – robot construction and arena combat.

=== Robot Construction ===
Screenshot from the GAR garage

The player begins by assembling a robot from stand-alone parts and composite modules in the Garage. Several parts are readily available while more powerful components must be unlocked by paying Credits – an in-game currency, earned by destroying opponents and completing objectives in combat. Players can also purchase Credits, but all of the parts can be obtained through regular gameplay. Each robot is composed of several main modules – Chassis, Body, Weapons, and Head, each with their specific function and stats. Only the Body's destruction eliminates the player completely from the game, while the other modules can be destroyed and still allow the player to continue fighting, albeit at a disadvantage. A destroyed Chassis will immobilize the player, and a destroyed Head will reverse his directional input. During the Open Beta, a fifth module type, Devices, was added. These range from mines to shield walls to turrets, and add a deeper strategic edge to the gameplay.

=== Arenas ===
A screenshot from the map "Abordage"

A screenshot from the map "Suburbia"

When a player is satisfied with the assembled robot, he can start battle. The arena and the members of each team are randomly selected. As of August 2013, three arenas are available: "High Noon" (inspired by Wild West frontier towns), "Suburbia" and "Abordage", featuring a pirates' theme.

=== Modes ===
Combat occurs in a classical third-person shooter fashion (although players can also zoom into first-person view), playable in timed 5-minute rounds, without respawn. GAR features three game modes, playable on each map and randomly assigned when a game round begins. In addition to the standard Team Deathmatch, Capture the Batteries offers a similar experience to the classic "capture the flag" modes, but the player has to obtain two of the opposing team's batteries; the second enemy battery only spawns when the first one is delivered to the stealing player's home base. Bomb Squad features a bomb that must be planted at the enemy base, and then protected until it detonates. Both "Capture the Batteries" and "Bomb Squad" award bonus XP and Credits if the round is won by completing its objective (as opposed to destroying the enemy team), which encourages team coordination and a more tactical approach, rather than a head-on assault.

== Development history ==
According to the developers' interview, the concept of the game came into their minds after an internal contest by the end of 2011. The game was officially announced in July 2012 initially with one map, "High Noon", a western-themed arena. Masthead Studios utilizes the Unity game engine to craft the graphics and atmosphere in the game. The game is offered in a free to play format. The first phase of the game release was an invitation-only closed beta in October of the same year and the invitations were sent to selected players who registered earlier for the closed beta test. At the beginning the matches within Guns and Robots follow a last man standing style of gameplay or "team deathmatch" mode where teams of 5 must destroy each other until no robot remains. Each robot's components can be individually damaged and destroyed, meaning robots can be crippled and unable to move or shoot before being destroyed.

The open beta of the game was released in January 2013. That July, the development team behind Guns and Robots unveiled a detailed roadmap for the then-upcoming major updates in matchmaking and global rebalance. Along with the major updates there were new modes released – "Capture the Batteries" and "Bomb Squad".
