= Myth War Online =

2006 video game

- Developer: Unigium
- Publisher: IGG Inc.
- Platform: Microsoft Windows
- Release: NA: 07-07-2006
- Genre: MMORPG
- Mode: Multiplayer

Myth War Online was a 2D fantasy-themed MMORPG developed by Chinese studio Unigium and published by IGG It is set in a fictional universe inhabited by mythological creatures. Combat occurs similar to old RPG games such as Final Fantasy where a player forms a party (mainly consisting of pets) and the sides take turns attacking each other. This style of gameplay is created to appeal to nostalgic classic RPG players. Events and content addons occur every two months in response to player demand.

As of May 2009, Myth War Online I had had all of its servers shut down permanently to make way for the sequel, Myth War Online II. Announcement of Closure for Myth War Online [Jan 15, 2015] Dear players,

With a heavy heart, we announce the closure of our beloved Myth War Online. Our sincerest thanks go out to everyone who have supported us all this time. .

== Character Races ==
There are four different races a player can choose from. Each is unique in its own way.

=== Humans ===
In the game, humans are a fallen tribe. The lives of humans are not affluent and stable. As a result, they have no choice but to do whatever they can even if it means doing something immoral or illegal. Humans are described as smart, reckless, wicked and go-getting.

=== Centaurs ===
Similar to humans, centaurs have a long history and civilization. However, in contrast to the other races, centaurs have a social system whereby the female possesses a higher status than a male. They are prized to be noble and beautiful. Despite their warlike appearance, they love peace and like to live in a quiet environment. Centaurs are born with great agility and have a high intelligence level and low vit.

=== Mages ===
Mages are normally a combination of humans and Centaurs. The race was cursed ever since it existed and was cursed again after they sold their souls to the dark lord. Although many have a deep hatred towards other races, some are intelligent enough to forgive and progress positively.

=== Borgs ===
Borgs are half robot-half human. Their vast knowledge of technology is their main form of power.
