= Face of Mankind =

2006 video game

- Developers: Duplex Systems; Nexeon Technologies
- Publisher: Nexeon Technologies
- Designer: Marko Dieckmann
- Platform: Windows
- Release: 27 March 2006
- Genre: MMO/Action RPG
- Mode: Multiplayer

Face of Mankind is a discontinued first and third-person massively multiplayer online action role playing game (MMOARPG) set in a futuristic persistent world. The game is played from a variety of points of view. It was designed to emphasize roleplay and community, using a faction system and player-driven politics. It was developed by German studio Duplex Systems.

== Gameplay ==
Players interact with each other in a freeform universe, consisting in a series of locations spread across various planets. Major roleplaying-based storylines, purely optional, are started and run by Duplex staff. Players in a position of power may also affect gameplay by setting a faction's agenda, creating long-term political, economic, or military goals, which are broken up into missions handed down through a faction's hierarchy in the form of player generated and driven missions.

== Character creation ==
As with other MMORPGs, players control a character avatar within a game world in third or first person view, exploring the worlds, participating in PVP combat, completing objectives, and interacting with non-player characters (NPCs) or other players.

To create a new character, players must choose between one of the eight factions. Players may choose from several sets of starting clothing as well as between male and female in addition to choosing their faction. Characters from each faction can communicate with others nearby or use the in-game mail, but players in the same faction can use a faction only chat to communicate with each other from anywhere. Each faction also has its own perks and play a different role in the game, such as EuroCore getting discounts on production of items and serving the role of one of the game's three corporations.

New characters may choose to go through the in-game tutorial and learn the basics of the game, such as movement, combat, and other important concepts. After the player finishes the tutorial there are 10 new player objectives that are designed to get the player to learn more about the game through exploring some of its more popular worlds and chatting with other players. New players are considered Trainees until they finish enough of these starter objectives to get 10,000 experience and be automatically promoted to Rank 1.

Although there is no in-game new player protection in place, the worlds that they are suggested to visit early on are usually well patrolled by the Law Enforcement Department resulting in stiff penalties for players attempting to grief newer players. New players are encouraged to stay safe by having weapons and armor on at all times, with most factions having armor and weapon stocks specifically for arming newer players.

== Factions ==
- Law Enforcement Department (Global Dominion: Police)
- Freedom Defense Corps (Global Dominion: Military)
- Galactic Intelligence Service (Global Dominion: Secret Service)
- Colonization and Mining Guild (Corporation: Mining)
- Eurocore (Corporation: Production)
- Vortex Inc. (Corporation: Transport)
- The Brotherhood of the Shadows (Clan: Gangs)
- Mercenaries of the Blood (Clan: Mercenaries)
- Guardians of Mankind (Clan: Freedom Fighters and Diplomats)
- Civilian Faction (Normal Players)

== Ongoing gameplay ==
Much of Face of Mankind play involves performing objectives, either alone or through the group system. These objectives are automatically generated when playing alone, or generated by way of starting the group when in a group. Objectives reward the player with some experience points and Faction Credits. Objectives commonly involve killing a number of other players, gathering a certain number of resources, patrolling a world, guarding specific locations, and many other objectives.

Faction Credits are traded in for Universal Credits four times a day depending on faction payout standards and the amount of Faction Credits earned by all players in the faction. Experience points earned allow players to gain higher ranks in their faction when appropriately ranked members of the faction see fit to promote them.

Depending on the current political situations, some factions may be at war with each other allowing players of opposing factions to fight each other with fewer penalties and even take over opposing factions' worlds. World occupation consists of several hours of combat and hacking that eventually leads to a roughly hour-long final battle for the world, where hundreds of players can be fighting for control. Characters can be permanently killed off if they both run out of clones and Universal Credits to buy new clones.

The game also has a completely closed economy. All revenues earned come from players paying for it. Game statistics were able to show which faction had the best income, per week.

== Premium subscription ==
Face of Mankind was free to play, offering a premium subscription as well as some items available as bonuses for purchasing certain subscriptions. Some of the premium bonuses include faster spawning, increased item storage, and ability to get the highest ranks in factions and even become faction leaders.

== History and important changes ==
- Closed Beta testing started in April 2004, and the first phase of Open Beta started in February 2005. The second phase of Open Beta testing ran from 9 December 2005 to 23 March 2006, ready for the launch on 27 March 2006.
- Face of Mankind was shipped for retail sale on 31 August 2006; both downloadable and retail versions were available.
- The Face of Mankind official portal was hit by a series of DDoS attacks during the month of May 2007; The attacks made the official portal unavailable throughout the month. These attacks were cited as playing a part in the eventual closure of Face of Mankind as a financial venture. The perpetrators were eventually arrested after an investigation by the Scotland Yard Computer Crime Unit.
- 2 November 2007, Face of Mankind publisher Ojom ceased support for the development and operation of the game. Duplex announced an attempt to continue the game without a publisher; further news and developments were announced on 14 November 2007, detailing how Duplex is going to be reworking the game mechanics in order to be able to fund it. The game would later be scrapped and reworked into a new game titled Face of Mankind Rebirth.
- June 2008, Marko Dieckmann declared on the official website that development of Face of Mankind Rebirth has been cancelled.
- 1 December 2008, www.faceofmankind.com was launched as well as forums. Face of Mankind will be developed in cooperation between Duplex Systems and Nexeon Technologies, the same company that would have provided hosting for the ill-fated emulation.
- On 20 February 2009, Duplex and NeXeon launch the Closed Beta version of the game.
- On 29 December 2009, Face of Mankind is released, introducing both free and premium accounts. Free accounts have multiple restrictions; such as limited storage, amount of items simultaneously on the market, the inability to gain higher than rank 4, and the inability to use Apartments and Civilian clothing (a later patch allowed free accounts to access apartments owned by premium accounts). The Premium account cost is US$9.99 per month.
- On 11 November 2010, Face of Mankind development was transferred from Duplex Systems to NeXeon Technologies inc.
- On 7 May 2013, NeXeon Technologies inc. launched a successful Kickstarter campaign to fund development of a new iteration of the game called Face of Mankind: Fall of the Dominion.
- On 10 April 2014, NeXeon Technologies inc. opened Fall of the Dominion open beta
- On 13 July 2015, NeXeon Technologies inc. announced that Face of Mankind will cease operations and close down on 31 August 2015.
- On 3 September 2015, Face of Mankind Fall of the Dominion was shut down.

== Reception ==
PC Gamer gave the game a score of 58 out of 100 and wrote: "It's debatable whether making players responsible for creating content is genius of laziness [sic]--doing so helps bond players to the game, but since Faces as few players to being with, you'll likely end up bored".
