= GodsWar Online =

2009 video game

GodsWar Online is MMORPG created by IGG. The game is set in Ancient Greece with a Greek mythology theme. GodsWar Online was released in May 2009. There are a total of 4 different classes which include: Warrior, Champion, Mage, and Priest. Players can choose their starting city which will either be Ancient Sparta or Ancient Athens. The city chosen will decide where the player starts off in the game. Each city has quests which can be used to obtain experience, talent points, equipment and/or silver.
