= Masthead Studios =

Bulgarian video game developer

- Company type: Independent company
- Industry: Video games
- Founded: 2005
- Headquarters: Sofia, Bulgaria
- Key people: Atanas Atanasov (CEO)
- Products: Guns and Robots; Earthrise
- Website: http://www.mastheadstudios.com

Masthead Studios is a Bulgarian video game developer, founded in 2005, specializing in massively multiplayer online role-playing games. Their latest PC game developed and published was Soul Grabber, released on Steam in 2019.

== Development history ==
=== Fallout Online ===
It was announced in April 2009 that Interplay were working with Masthead Studios to complete work on Fallout Online, a Fallout universe-based massively multiplayer online role-playing game. In September of the same year, Bethesda began legal action against Interplay about the project, because Interplay had sought to recruit Masthead Studios to develop the MMO eleven days after Bethesda had revoked the Fallout license. The result was that all rights granted to Interplay to develop a Fallout online game were returned to Bethesda.

=== Earthrise ===
Masthead Studios' first independent project, Earthrise, was released in February 2011. Earthrise and its engine were in development for six years. At the beginning of 2012, the ownership and management of the game was transferred to Silent Future, a Germany-based company, for further development.

=== Guns and Robots ===
Masthead Studios is developing an online shooter game called Guns and Robots, featuring robot customization. The game is offered in free-to-play format. The graphics and atmosphere of the game are produced with the Unity game engine. The development started with an initial limited closed beta test, followed by an open beta released in January 2013. After the success of the open beta phase, Guns and Robots has been approved on Steam Greenlight and is available on Steam for purchase.

=== Minor releases ===
The company released the game Soul Grabber on Steam in 2019. Mr Robo Gun: Bullets Ricochet Puzzle was also released as an Android mobile game in 2020.
