= Spiral Knights =

2011 video game

- Developers: Three Rings Design; Grey Havens
- Publishers: Three Rings Design; Grey Havens
- Composer: Harry Mack
- Platforms: Any with Java, incl. Linux, Mac, Windows
- Release: April 4, 2011
- Genres: Hack and slash, MMOG
- Modes: Multiplayer, single player

Spiral Knights is a massively multiplayer online game created by Three Rings Design and now owned by Grey Havens. The free-to-play, Java-based game was released in 2011 and is still updated with new content and re-occurring events.

In the game, the player controls a knight of the Spiral order, which has crash-landed on the mysterious planet Cradle. Knights cooperatively battle monsters throughout the Clockworks, the dungeon that fills the planet's interior. They also battle each other in an optional player-versus-player mode.

Spiral Knights reached one million accounts in its first three months and three million accounts in its first thirteen months. The game won Best Online Game Design, and was nominated for three other awards, in the 2011 Game Developers Choice Online Awards.

== Gameplay ==
The Spiral Knights are a spacefaring army from the planet Isora. Their ship, the Skylark, has crashed on the planet Cradle. The interior of the planet is filled with a mechanized, continually reconfiguring dungeon called the Clockworks. Operating out of the town of Haven on the planet's surface, the knights descend into the Clockworks, with the goal of understanding the mysterious energy source at the planet's core. They hope to exploit this energy source to resurrect and re-launch the Skylark.

In its gameplay, Spiral Knights is a top-down, third-person, real-time action-adventure game, comparable to The Legend of Zelda: Four Swords Adventures. The player controls a single knight, and may play solo or with other players. When exploring the Clockworks, knights cooperate to defeat crowds of enemies of various types, while dodging traps and solving simple puzzles. There are four main bosses, each with an alternate "Shadow Lair" variant, and numerous mini-bosses. In addition to this player-versus-enemy mode, there are two optional player-versus-player modes: one that is similar to Clockworks play, and a Bomberman-like mini-game that differs substantially from the rest of the game.

When they are not battling enemies or each other, knights train, shop, trade, and chat in Haven. Character progress comes not through the improvement of personal statistics, but rather through upgrades to equipment. Weapons include swords, handguns, and bombs offering various play styles and characteristics.

The game's visual style has been called "adorable" and "cutesy". The art work draws on many traditions and cultures beyond medieval European knights and outer space science fiction — for example, cowboys, wizards, ninjas, and chefs.

Spiral Knights is massively multiplayer, although each player interacts with a small subset of other online players at any given time. Clockworks parties are limited to up to four knights and player-versus-player contests are limited to six-versus-six. Instances (copies) of Haven typically have tens of knights present. Guilds are limited to 100 members by default, and friend lists are capped at 250.

The entire game is free-to-play. There is no in-game advertising. Players can spend real-world money to purchase an in-game commodity called energy. Energy can be exchanged for other commodities and currency, to accelerate a knight's development. Real money can also buy certain costumes and promotional items.

== Weapons ==
There are many different types of weapons that players can use in Spiral Knights. Some weapons are better for close combat, while others are better for long-range combat. There are also different types of weapons and damage types that players can use depending on their combat needs. Each type of weapon has its own unique advantages and disadvantages. For example, bombs are great for dealing damage to large groups of enemies, but they have a limited range and can be difficult to aim. Swords are quick and deadly, but they require getting up close to enemies, which can be hazardous for your health. Guns are a preferred option depending on the enemies you are fighting since they can combine distance with balanced damage.

=== Damage types ===
Each weapon has a type of damage. They include normal, elemental, piercing, and shadow damage types. A weapon can use a single damage type or a dual damage type. Choose your damage type based on the weakness of the enemies you are facing.

=== Status types ===
Weapons can also have a status which acts like an enhancer. They include curse, fire, freeze, poison, shock, sleep, and stun. These weapons add status conditions on impact that either act as damage enhancers or cause opponents to take periodic damage. As a player, you will want to use a series of weapon sets which have varying statuses to clear levels and kill bosses most efficiently based on their weakness.

== Armor ==
Spiral Knights does not have specific character classes, but uses a class-based armor set equipment system instead. They include bomber armor sets for bonus damage, wolver armor sets for things like sword attack speed increases, and gunslinger sets for ranged damaged bonuses with guns. There are many armor sets with varying bonuses depending on the build you are trying to create or damage you are trying to amplify. The armor is also rated on a star-based system with 0 star being lowest (no abilities) to 5 star being the highest with matched set enhancer abilities.

== Plot ==
The Spiral Knights are a spacefaring army serving under the Spiral Order organisation. According to the prologue, the war against the Morai brought them near extinction on their home planet of Isora. The crew of the Skylark, a spaceship of the Spiral Order, fled the planet in search for "a source of incredible power" in hopes of being able to use it to save their planet, and in doing so, discover the planet of Cradle. As Captain Ozlo declared preparations to descend into Cradle, the Skylark was attacked by a heavy firepower, damaging the tearium core of the ship and rendering the ship destroyed. All knights abroad the Skylark evacuated via escape pods. The player is one of these knights, and upon completing character customisation is led by Rhendon, a Recon Knight, through the Crash Site to the Rescue Camp. This serves as the tutorial of the gameplay.

Upon reaching the Rescue Camp, the player is tasked with restoring power to the camp before nightfall in a nearby ancient power generator. Razwog, a Gremlin schemer, attacks the player with enemies. Upon defeating him, an item known as the Artifact is taken from him. Power is restored to the Rescue Camp and contact with Spiral HQ is made. Intel Agent Kora of Spiral HQ gives an explanation of the Clockworks and gives the player directions to Haven, a nearby town. The player, accompanied by Rhendon, cross the chasm and on their journey to Haven, encounter Razwog again and defeating him. The player reaches Haven, and Kora introduces them to more missions. The Clockworks are the machinery making up the structure of the planet, constantly reconfiguring itself, functioning as a dungeon mechanic in the game. The Clockworks are built and maintained by the Gremlins, serving as the main antagonists of the game, who inhabit the Great Colony, ruled by King Tinkinzar and his Crimson Order, a group of nine powerful Gremlins who carry out his orders.

Kora informs the player that Captain Ozlo has assigned the player to search for Alpha Squad, an elite squad of knights sent into the Clockworks first to locate the origin of the energy signals. Due to the communication systems on the Skylark going offline, recon modules were left throughout their travels in the Clockworks detailing their journeys. These knights, consisting of Squad Leader Euclid, Squad Guardian Grantz, Squad Recon Parma, and Squad Technician Rulen, were tasked with finding the source of the energy in hopes of utilising the energy to restore the Skylark to operation and win the Morai Wars. The player learns that the first module is located in the Gloaming Wildwoods, guarded by a beast known as the Snarbolax, serving as the first major boss of the game. The player defeats the Snarbolax and recovers Euclid's module. The player is also introduced to the first subtown, Moorcraft Manor, run by Spookats and Zombies which the player can interact with.

The Gremlins, in an attempt to retrieve the Artifact, besiege the Lab, where the Spiral Knights conduct their research. Herex, a member of the Crimson Order who is also in charge of Compound 42, a bioweapons facility, sneakily retrieves the Artifact and promptly disappears, leading to speculation about what the significance of the Artifact is to the Gremlins.

Kora informs the player of a strange energy signal and assigns the player to explore the Royal Jelly Palace, explaining that the Slime family of monsters is ruled by an aristocracy. After defeating the second major boss, the Royal Jelly, Parma's module is discovered. Kora later informs the player that the Gremlins have conspired to create some 'Project R' bent on the destruction of Haven. The player discovers a large Gun Puppy chassis labelled "Project R" in a toxic cavern; later discovered to be massive Gun Puppies called the "Roarmulus Twins" which Warmaster Seerus of the Crimson Order, in charge of the Grand Arsenal which the player can fight in the expansion mission "Operation Crimson Hammer", intends to raise up to the Arcade to destroy Haven. The player then enters the Ironclaw Munitions Factory to defeat the Roarmulus Twins, the third major boss, and retrieve Rulen's module. The player is also introduced to the second subtown, Emberlight, a village of Gremlin outcasts, banished from the Gremlin Great Colony. The player can interact with these Gremlins and from dialogue learn that the inhabitants of Emberlight fear that King Tinkinzar will eventually wipe out these outcasts.

The player raids a Crimson Order hideout, finding corpses of dead Gremlins and discover one of Herex's hideouts, learning that Herex, at least secretly, has repudiated the authority of the Crimson Order, and believes that only he will prevail out of the Nine. Later, Lieutenant Feron, foreshadowing the Sleeper, explains that the Core and the Clockworks are "a massive prison designed to keep something from ever leaving". Kora, with new intel, informs the player that the path to the Core has been blocked by "endless fire", and upon suggestion by the Spookats of Moorcraft, the player investigates a nearby Owlite castle in search for an ancient tome describing the source of the negative energy above the Core. Upon reading and deciphering the worn pages, the player learns of the Kingdom of Almire, a once prosperous and beautiful land of forests and plains, was ruled by the late Lord Vanaduke. Neighbouring kingdoms feared Almire's growing power and declared war, enslaving the population of Almire and forcing Vanaduke to flee to the mountains. Desperate to liberate Almire, he prayed to a god named Vog, who was some type of fire deity. Vog transformed Vanaduke into a powerful fiery warrior in control of hordes of undead legions and destroyed the empires that invaded Almire, but in doing so also destroyed Almire and its citizens. The tome suggests that it happened thousands of years ago.

Spiral HQ requests that the player find and locate Guardian Knight Arkus, sent with his squad to locate the Alpha Squad, who perished in battle. Wracked with grief, Arkus explored the Clockworks to somehow "find" his dead squadron. Once the player locates Arkus, Arkus warns them to leave them alone. The player continues to pursue him and is forced to kill him. After this, Kora assigns the player to enter the Firestorm Citadel, the only part of the ancient kingdom that remains. Lieutenant Vaelyn also contacts the player, expressing her interest to enter the Core to locate the Alpha Squad. A Lost Soul of Almire speaks to the player, informing them that within the Firestorm Citadel exists a force of nature sent to extinguish the fires of Almire.

Entering the Firestorm Citadel, the player meets the Nature Sprite, requesting that the player aid them in restoring nature to Almire by freeing the Lost Sprites. At the Throne Room, Vanaduke declares that Almire "shall never fall to the likes of beasts". Serving as the fourth and (currently) final major boss of the game, defeating him allows the player to recover Grantz's recon module and reach the Core. At the Core, a module belonging to Parma indicating that the Alpha Squad "entered" the Core is discovered.

A later mission requires the player to save a squad of Recon Rangers, formally introducing the player to the Swarm, an unknown entity associated with the Core and Shadow Lairs. After, Kora informs the player that energy signals identical to those of the Artifact were discovered at the Firestorm Citadel, requesting the player to check it out. Although the Nature Sprites have cleared most of the flames, a disturbance has caused a resurgence of the destructive energy. Entering the Firestorm Citadel once again, the player meets Herex, who uses the Artifact to activate something. After defeating Herex, Herex tells the player to meet him in the Core.

Vaelyn sends an emergency message to the player, requesting backup as the Core is opening. Vaelyn and the player meet Herex once again, descending into the Core and meeting more Swarm enemies. After clearing the enemies in the Core, Vaelyn and the player reach a refuge, finding Parma's Scout. Parma explains that although Grantz was killed while defending the team and Rulen has mysteriously disappeared, she is in a safe place, and that she and Euclid are helping a mysterious entity known as "The Sleeper". From Echo Stones created by The Sleeper found in the Shadow Lairs, it is revealed that Cradle was created to protect it, that the Gremlins betrayed it, and that the Swarm expands endlessly, consuming everything. Upon returning to Haven, Kora contacts the player, who fills her in on what occurred in the Core. Amazed, she passes the information on to Spiral HQ and prepares to send the player on another mission.

== History ==
Spiral Knights has been in development since around 2007. The game was released to advance testers on November 12, 2009 and to the general public on April 4, 2011. The game was released through the Steam software distribution system on June 14, 2011. It was also made available through gaming web sites such as Kongregate and Armor Games. The game, along with most of Three Rings's software, originally ran on Java 6; as of February 2026, it bundles a Java 21 runtime as part of the installation.

As encouragement to get players in the game, Team Fortress 2 added a special item for any players that completed the first mission. Players who own both games will receive a message from Saxton Hale offering the promotion.

Critical response to Spiral Knights was positive. Ars Technica's Andrew Webster wrote, "The quality of free-to-play games continues to rise, and Spiral Knights is proof of this. It's fun, addictive..." Tony Sims wrote for Wired, "It is very fun and addictive, however hardcore gamers might find it too old-school."

The game was nominated for the 2011 Game Developers Choice Online Awards in four categories: Best Visual Online Arts, Best Online Game Design, Best Audio for an Online Game, and Best New Online Game. It won the award for Best Online Game Design.

For the first two years of the game's general availability, playing time was restricted by the in-game commodity of energy. Tom Senior of PC Gamer wrote, "When an energy drought stops play halfway through a session with friends, it's like being poked in the eye." However, the energy system was redesigned in the July 30, 2013 game update, and this criticism no longer applies.

Nick Popovich was the lead designer of Spiral Knights for all of its early development. On January 16, 2014, Popovich resigned his position at Three Rings, leaving the continuing development of the game to the rest of the Spiral Knights team.

On April 6, 2016, ownership of the game was transferred to the company Grey Havens. Grey Havens is a group of former Three Rings employees, which was founded to keep Three Rings games online. By July 2018, the game had over 5 million registered accounts through Steam. (This figure does not include accounts created through other means, such as the game's web site.)
