= Steve Yegge =

American computer programmer and blogger

- Education: University of Washington
- Occupation: programmer

Steve Yegge is an American computer programmer and blogger who is known for writing about programming languages, productivity and software culture through his "Stevey's Drunken Blog Rants" site, followed by "Stevey's Blog Rants."

== Education ==
Yegge began high school at 11 and graduated when he was 14. During his youth, Yegge played guitar in garage bands. After turning 18, Yegge joined the United States Navy and attended Nuclear Power School to become a nuclear reactor operator. Yegge received a bachelor's degree in computer science from the University of Washington.

== Career ==
Screenshot of Wyvern

Yegge began his career as a computer programmer at GeoWorks in 1992. From 1998 to 2005, he worked as a Senior Manager of Software Development at Amazon. From 2005 to 2018, Yegge worked as a Senior Staff Software Engineer at Google in Kirkland, Washington. In 2018, Yegge left Google to join Grab, a ridesharing company based in Singapore with an American hub in Seattle. After leaving Google, Yegge was interviewed by CNBC about why he left the company. Yegge stated that the company had grown "too conservative" and was "no longer innovative."

In May 2020, Yegge announced that he would be leaving Grab to focus on the development of Wyvern, a video game he has been working on independently since 1995.

In October 2022, Yegge joined Sourcegraph as Head of Engineering.

Yegge accidentally made an internal Google memo public on Google+ in October 2011. His 3,700-word comment garnered major media and blogger attention for Yegge's pointed commentary criticizing the leanings of the company's technological culture (such as labeling Google+'s minimalist and, in his view, lackluster public platform "a pathetic afterthought") as well as for his comments about his former employer, Amazon (such as calling Amazon CEO Jeff Bezos "Dread Pirate Bezos"). Google co-founder Sergey Brin stated that Yegge will not be fired and would still have his job since he meant for the memo to be an employees only email. Washington Post reporter Melissa Bell stated that Yegge's public rant was a Jerry Maguire moment.

=== Software ===
Yegge advocates server-side JavaScript for development. After failing to convince Google to adopt Ruby on Rails, he ported Rails to JavaScript, creating the "Rhino on Rails" project. In 2008, Yegge was interviewed for the Google Code Blog and discussed the "Rhino on Rails" project. His work on "Rhino on Rails" has inspired at least one open-source clone, LatteJS.

=== Vibe coding and cryptocurrency ===
Yegge has become a strong advocate of vibe coding, using a chatbot to write code. He coauthored the book Vibe Coding with Gene Kim. In January 2026, Yegge launched a project called Gas Town, a vibe coding orchestrator. Yegge states that Gas Town is "100% vibe coded. I’ve never seen the code, and I never care to, which might give you pause." An unknown person created a meme coin called $GAS, named after the Gas Town project, that paid transaction fees to Yegge; Yegge endorsed the project. The meme coin collapsed with an apparent rugpull, but Yegge made over $290,000 from it.

=== Presentations ===
In 2007, Yegge was a speaker at the UIUC 13th annual reflections❘projections Conference. In May 2008, Yegge presented a talk on dynamic languages at Stanford University. In July 2007, Yegge was a presenter at OSCON 2007, presenting a keynote speech on "How to Ignore Marketing and Become Irrelevant in Two Easy Steps".
