= Puzzle Pirates =

2003 video game

- Developer: Grey Havens
- Publisher: Grey Havens
- Platforms: Any with Java, incl. Windows, Mac, Linux, iPad (No longer supported)
- Release: December 8, 2003
- Genre: MMOG
- Modes: Multiplayer, Singleplayer (Only with CD)

Puzzle Pirates (also known as Yohoho! Puzzle Pirates) is a massively multiplayer online game developed by Three Rings Design (Later owned by Grey Havens LLC).

During the 7th Annual Interactive Achievement Awards, the Academy of Interactive Arts & Sciences nominated Puzzle Pirates for "Massively Mutliplayer/Persistent World Game of the Year".

== Gameplay ==
The player takes the role of a pirate, adventuring on the high seas and pillaging money ("pieces of eight") from enemy ships (human or computer-controlled). The mechanics of the game are driven by puzzles.

Puzzle Pirates is open-ended and community-driven. Over time, pirates can join a crew, progress in rank within that crew, buy and run sailing vessels and shoppes, and become captain of a crew, royalty within an alliance of crews, or governor of an island. Players are able to help expand the game, with puzzles, in-game objects, and artwork.

== History ==
As of December 2008, there were 4 million users registered to the game.

On August 31, 2011, the game was made free-to-play on Steam. Support for an iPad platform was developed and released in 2013. Three Rings later announced the removal of the iPad application and ceased support of the platform in July 2014.

On April 5, 2016, Three Rings Design announced that support for the game would shift from them to Grey Havens, a company consisting of former Three Rings employees.
