= List of massively multiplayer online turn-based strategy games =

This is a comprehensive index of massively multiplayer online turn-based strategy games, sorted chronologically. Turn-based games include tick-based games that reset the number of allowed actions after a certain time period. Information regarding date of release, developer, platform, setting and notability is provided when available. The table can be sorted by clicking on the small boxes next to the column headings.

== Legend ==
Video game platforms
ATRST	Atari ST, Atari Falcon	BBS	BBS door	DROID	Android
iOS	iOS, iPhone, iPod, iPadOS, iPad, visionOS, Apple Vision Pro	TRS80	TRS-80	WEB	Browser game

Types of releases
Compilation	A compilation, anthology or collection of several titles, usually (but not always) belonging to the same series
Early access	A game launched in early access is unfinished and thus might contain bugs and glitches or have some of the content missing
Episodic	An episodic video game that is released in batches over a period of time
Expansion	A large-scale DLC to an already existing game that adds new story, areas and additions and/or changes to the game's mechanics
Full release	A full release of a game that launched in early access first
Limited	A special release (often called "Limited" or "Collector's Edition") with bonus collector's material. Often provided to people who pre-order a game
Port	The game first appeared on a different platform and a port was made. The game is like the original, with few or no differences
Remake	The game is an enhanced remake of an original, made using a new engine and/or assets and thus containing completely new sound, graphics and possibly changes to the story and/or gameplay
Remaster	The game is a remaster of an original, released on the same or different platform, with (usually minor) changes to graphics, sound and/or gameplay
Rerelease	The game was re-released on the same platform with no or only minor changes

== Turn-based/Tick-based ==
Year	Game	Developer	Setting	Platform	Notes
1980	Trade Wars	Chris Sherrick	Sci-fi	BBS, TRS80	
1986	TradeWars 2002	Gary Martin, John Pritchett	Sci-fi	BBS, WEB	
1987	Space Empire Elite	Jon Radoff	Sci-fi	ATRST, BBS	
1990	Solar Realms Elite	Amit Patel	Sci-fi	BBS	Started as a Space Empire Elite clone.
1992	Barren Realms Elite	Mehul Patel	Sci-fi	BBS	Started as a Solar Realms Elite clone.
1993	Falcon's Eye	Mehul Patel	Fantasy	BBS	
c. 1990	Space Dynasty	Hollie Satterfield	Sci-fi	BBS	Started as a Solar Realms Elite clone.
c. 1990	STellar Chaos	Roger M. Thomas	Sci-fi	ATRST, BBS	
c. 1990	Yankee Trader	Alan Davenport	Sci-fi	BBS	
1996	Earth: 2025	Mehul Patel	Sci-fi	WEB	
1996	Utopia	Mehul Patel	Sci-fi	WEB	
1998	Horseland	Horseland LLC	Fantasy	WEB	
1998	UltraCorps	VR-1, SJ Games	Sci-fi	WEB	
2000	Planetarion	Fifth Season AS	Sci-fi	WEB	
2001	NukeZone	Stefan Karlström	Sci-fi	WEB	
2003	Defcon5	Rickard Dahlstedt	Historical	WEB	
2004	Reign	Ty Kauffman, Mark Caudill, David DiBattiste	Sci-fi	WEB	
2005	Urban Dead	Kevan Davis	Horror	WEB	
2006	KDice	Ryan Dewsbury	Abstract	WEB	
2006	PoxNora	Octopi, Inc.	Fantasy	WEB	
2008	Continuum, The	Seven Lights	Sci-fi	WEB	
2011	King's Bounty: Legions	Nival	Fantasy	WEB, DROID, iOS	
2012	Freeciv Greatturn	Davide Baldini	Historical		
2014	Summoners War: Sky Arena	Com2uS Studios	Fantasy	DROID, iOS	

== See also ==
- List of massively multiplayer online games
- List of free massively multiplayer online games
- List of free multiplayer online games
- List of multiplayer browser games
- Online game
- Strategy video game
- Turn-based strategy
