= Utopia (1998 video game) =

- Developer: Mehul Patel
- Publishers: Solaria Interactive/Echelon Entertainment/Swirve.com (1998-2008); Jolt Online Gaming (2008); Scale Front Limited (2009-2017); MUGA Gaming LLC (2017-2024)
- Programmers: Mehul Patel, Sean Blanchfield and Brian McDonnell, Kagge
- Engine: Python
- Release: October 11, 1998
- Genres: MMORPG, RTS
- Mode: Multiplayer

Utopia is a free-to-play massively multiplayer online role-playing browser game that was developed and published by Mehul Patel, under the label of Solaria Interactive, Echelon Entertainment, and Swirve.com. It was released on October 11, 1998. Using real-time strategy gameplay and text-based graphics, it takes place in a fantasy world during intervals of about 10-12 weeks called Ages. Game mechanics change from Age to Age. Generally speaking, individual players manage a principality as part of a larger kingdom with a player serving as the monarch, with the goal of becoming as large as possible by capturing land from other players.

Utopia is currently the longest-running online role-playing game in the world. The game peaked in the early 2000s with around 100,000 active users. Patel gradually lost interest and sold it to Jolt in 2008. It was quickly sold to Sean Blanchfield and Brian McDonnell of Scale Front Limited in 2009, who rewrote the game from scratch after a 2009 denial-of-service attack. However, they eventually allowed the game to stagnate with only minor changes and updates due to having full-time jobs in another company. In 2017, long-time players David Cannata and Jeff Mahan of MUGA Gaming LLC purchased the game from Scale Front with the intent to revive it. In 2017, the game had a community of 3,300 users. It is still running as of September 2025 22.

== Gameplay ==
Each Age, the span of time during which each game is played, lasts about 10-12 real-world weeks. At the beginning of each Age, the player chooses from a selection of numerous playable humanoid races, faery, orc, dwarf, elf, halfling, undead, avian and human, as well as choosing a personality such as thief, mage or attacker, starting the game with a principality. Each island contains dozens of principalities, which together form a kingdom with a monarch at its head. This ruler is elected by the votes of each principality's leader. Strategies vary depending on the player's race, with each player entering the game daily in order to command their principality. Players can be declared inactive by the kingdom's ruler if they do not check in.

Principalities can attack each other in intra-kingdom conflict, while the kingdom is also at war with other islands. Players' general goal is to seize land, but sending troops outside one's island can leave the principality defenseless for others to invade, requiring troops to remain on defense. Communication within the game takes place entirely by written message.

== Development ==
Utopia was initially programmed by Mehul Patel, who started programming games for pre-Internet bulletin board systems. He developed the game while he was a student at the University of Texas at Austin, and was 22 years old when Utopia launched. He created it because he "liked the idea of empire building, building economies, building relationships, building a social-type game". The takeover of Swirve.com, Patel's site, which hosted Utopia and Earth: 2025, was completed on July 7, 2008 after Patel sold it to OMAC Industries (Jolt Online Gaming). By 2017, Patel owned an Austin-based escape room, and did not even realize the game was still active, as he had designed the game for dial-up Internet and believed it would not survive the transition to broadband, being unsure if it would even last one or two years.

== Reception ==
In 2001, Burak Akmenek of Level magazine described Utopia's user interface as "simple", but called its strategy and community "tremendously lively", and said he was never bored despite playing the game for months, noting that he could "write pages" about the game. In a 2003 review published in XtremPC magazine, Juncu Ioana rated Utopia highly, saying that he still loved it to that day. Noting that "teamwork and interactivity compensate for the lack of graphics", he described the game as "addictive". Calling the player base of 80,000 "impressive", he said that its human community was what made it "amazing". In 2017, Tyler Harper of Vice stated that "Utopia may not be much to look at", describing it as appearing "slightly better than something a high school student might design in a coding class", but called its gameplay "timeless". He described its real-time nature as being a precursor to later games such as Clash of Clans. Harper noted that some players are so dedicated to the game that they have played it since its inception.

=== Awards ===
Swirve.com won the People's Voice Webby Award in the Games category in 2002 and 2003.

== Legacy ==
The game saw a sequel, Utopia Kingdoms, developed by Jolt Online Gaming and XS Software.
