= Jolt Online Gaming =

Defunct video game website (1999-2012)

- Type: Online gaming network
- Founded: 1999
- Defunct: 16 March 2012
- Headquarters: Dublin, Ireland
- Key people: Dylan Collins

Jolt Online Gaming was an online gaming company hosted in Ireland. Its main site provided news, reviews, and interviews concerning upcoming games on consoles and computers, while its gaming network Jolt Online Gaming Network hosted and published free-to-play browser-based games. Notable works included Utopia, Utopia Kingdoms, Legends of Zork, and NationStates 2.

As of 14 March 2012 Jolt's CEO Richard Barnwell announced through the Utopia Kingdoms forum that the company would be closing in the next couple of days:

"It's my job to oversee the Games Studios and all of the people and games within them. So as you can imagine, Utopia Kingdoms has been a big part of my life. It's therefore with disappointment I have to share the news with you that Jolt will be closing down at the end of the week - March 16th 2012."

— Richard Barnwell

== History ==
Founded in 1999, Jolt Online Gaming was based in Europe, with servers across the US. Jolt was known as one of the pioneers of the supply of rentable servers to online gaming clans. Jolt was acquired by Dylan Collins' OMAC Industries, a company based in Dublin, Ireland in June 2008 and the companies merged all branding into the former. On 8 November 2009 the website Silicon Republic confirmed that GameStop had acquired a stake in Jolt, making a major, undisclosed investment.

The Jolt Online Gaming Network had been noted for releasing browser-based games using the names and fictional worlds of older games or franchises. Their business models often employed micropayment systems, as well as basic banner advertisements.

== Hosted games ==
=== Championship Manager: Rivals ===
Championship Manager: Rivals is a football (soccer) game playable through the Facebook website. It was officially released on 1 June 2011 by Jolt Online and developed by Beautiful Game Studios.

The game is the most successful game that Jolt currently has, with a user base of 30,000 monthly active users (MAU). Jolt announced updates including player vs. player gaming, which would allow friend's teams to play against each other.

With the recent changes the company is experiencing (as of 16 March 2012), the future of Championship Manager: Rivals is unknown. The game's forum is down and the company has not specified how the company's closure will affect the game. There are no noticeable changes in-game, and no downtime reported.

=== Earth: 2025 ===
Earth: 2025 was a browser-based massive multiplayer internet-based strategy game, originally created and run by Mehul Patel. It was first officially brought online in 1997 and acquired by Jolt through the 2008 sale of Swirve.com to Omac Industries.

In 2008 Jolt acquired this game along with Swirve's Utopia. On 4 November 2009 Jolt announced that they would no longer be continuing the game when the current rounds end in December, citing an over abundance of technical problems which allegedly made continuing support untenable.

=== Utopia ===
Utopia is a browser-based massively multiplayer online role-playing game, originally developed by Mehul Patel and run by Swirve.com. It was first officially brought online in 1998 and acquired by Jolt through the 2008 sale of Swirve.com to OMAC Industries.

In 2009, following repeated denial-of-service attacks on the Utopia servers, Jolt sold the IP to the Dublin-based Scale Front Limited (Sean Blanchfield and Brian McDonnell) and shut down the old game servers. Scale Front relaunched the game at utopia-game.com by the end of the year, after rewriting its code base from scratch with identical gameplay. In February 2017, Blanchfield and McDonnell announced the sale of the game to the Massachusetts-based MUGA Gaming LLC, headed by David Cannata and Jeff Terkowitz.

=== Utopia Kingdoms ===
Utopia Kingdoms is an online strategy game related to the universe of Utopia which was released in early 2009 and originally promoted as a kind of sequel. Utopia Kingdoms allows players to pick a race from the original game and build a kingdom, juggling buildings, resource manufacturing, and high-risk combat. It was made in conjunction with XS Software and is based on their game, Khan Wars. On 16 November 2010 Jolt announced that Utopia Kingdoms would be discontinued after 31 January 2011, citing lack of development resources. Around the same time, Jolt Online who had already been developing a re-release of Utopia Kingdoms game on Facebook, announced it officially on 11 November 2010 on the game's Facebook page. The original official forum announcement was lost due to data failure on or around 21 December 2010, the forum announced a second "welcome" to current Utopia Kingdoms players on 22 December 2010, which was thought to be the "official" release of the game, although it was not.

Jolt Online's CEO Richard Barnwell communicated that the company's closure will not affect Utopia Kingdoms:

I believe so much in the future of the game - I've taken it on personally. Utopia Kingdoms has just become an Indie game! It will remain alive and you can continue to play as you have been. I hope the following questions and answers help explain the situation further.

— Richard Barnwell

=== Legends of Zork ===
Legends of Zork was a casual adventure game that was released in April 2009 that took place in the Zork universe, a text-based adventure game created in the 1980s for the PC. It was released on April Fool's Day 2009, to mixed reviews, with some saying that it had little to do with the original Zork. Other, more recent reviews of the game were more positive, describing later features added to the game "with puzzles that would make the original Zork developers proud." Finally, on 24 May 2011, two years and one month after its release, Jolt Online announced the game closure to players in-game.

=== Hattrick ===
Hattrick, a Swedish-based sports game, agreed to allow Jolt to host their game and make it available to more countries including the US, UK, Ireland, and Australia.

=== Trukz ===
Trukz was a text-based game that allowed the player to create a truck driver and simulate the multitude of struggles cargo truck drivers endure on the road, the goal being upgrading their vehicle with commissions earned from the shipping and earning achievements for playing. The game used Google Maps to point out cities they visited or pass on their drives. On 16 November 2010 Jolt announced that Trukz would be discontinued after 31 January 2011, citing lack of development resources.

=== Playboy Party ===
Playboy Party was a short lived online game released on Facebook around 30 November 2010. The game was released after Jolt failed to launch the long promised Playboy Manager game that they had planned in conjunction with Playboy since 2009. The game consisted in the player being a talent agent managing supermodels in an attempt to beat other agents to a prized spot as a Playboy supermodel. It was announced in May 2009 and garnered media coverage from well-known publications such as The Wall Street Journal and Forbes. The original Playboy Manager website contained the options to pre-register, beta sign-ups and subscription to updates, as well as promotional content. The Playboy Party game in Facebook was poorly managed, requiring a reset that made players start from scratch on March 31, 2011. It was closed six months later on September 12, 2011.

=== NationStates 2 ===
NationStates 2 was a sequel to the popular society simulation game Jennifer Government: NationStates, which lost its authorization after not meeting its contractual obligations to the owner of the original NationStates. NationStates 2 was unpopular next to its predecessor, suffering from technical issues and was later discontinued. After it was taken down, the owner of NationStates, author Max Barry reclaimed the domain and encouraged users to return or try the original version which was "now proudly Jolt-free".
