= Com2uS Holdings =

Mobile video game developer

- Type: Public
- Traded as: KRX: 063080
- Industry: Mobile game industry
- Founded: January 12, 2000; 26 years ago
- Headquarters: Seoul (Republic of Korea); Torrance, California (U.S.)
- Key people: James Song (Founder, CEO)
- Subsidiaries: Com2uS
- Website: Official website

Com2uS Holdings (formerly as Gamevil Inc.) ((주)게임빌) is a public company based in Seoul, Republic of Korea, and Torrance, California, which develops and publishes video games for mobile devices. As of May 2017, the company's market capitalization is around 400 million dollars. On October 4, 2013, it acquired one of its main competitors, Com2uS.

== Gamevil Inc. ==
While attending Seoul National University, Byung Joon "James" Song founded and was elected as the first chairman of an entrepreneur club named "Venture". James Song went on and founded Fitsnet Inc. ((주)피츠넷) on January 12 of 2000, and started its online game service as Gamevil in March 2000. Fitsnet serviced its first Java mobile game in January 2001 on LG Telecom. Afterward, Fitsnet officially changed its company name to Gamevil Inc. in April 2001. James Song also founded and was elected as the first chairman of the KMGA (Korean Mobile Game Association) in August 2001. Gamevil went public in July 2009, and is currently listed in the KOSDAQ market (063080).

Gamevil has created more than 60 video games, including 10 award-winning games such as NOM and Skipping Stone. It is now one of the largest mobile game companies in the Republic of Korea, servicing its games on SK Telecom, KTF, and LG Telecom.

Gamevil acquired one of its oldest rivals, Seoul-based Com2uS on October 4, 2013.

Gamevil has announced it is expanding into Europe, with the opening of a Berlin office in autumn 2014.

On November 30, 2021, Gamevil changed its corporate name to ‘Com2uS Holdings’ after 21 years in order to strengthen its holding role and increase cooperation with other affiliates in hopes of increasing its reach at a time of rapid global expansion.

== Gamevil USA, Inc. ==
Gamevil Inc. expanded to the United States of America in February 2006 by opening its office in El Segundo, California (named Gamevil USA, Inc.) and has made its games available via Amp'd Mobile, Apple App Store, AT&T Wireless, BlackBerry App World, Boost Mobile, Cellular South, Cricket Communications, Android Market, Google Play, Helio, MetroPCS, Midwest Wireless, Nintendo DSi Shop, nTelos, Sprint Nextel, T-Mobile USA, Windows Marketplace for Mobile, Verizon Wireless and Zeebo. Gamevil USA, Inc. moved its office to Torrance, California in August 2007.

== Studios ==
List of studios
Name	Location	Acquired	Ref(s).
Nine Wheels	Seoul, South Korea	2013	
Everple	Seoul, South Korea	2013	
DBROS	Seoul, South Korea	2013	
Wafflesoft	Brisbane, Australia	2014	

== Games ==
=== United States ===
A

- Afterpulse
- Art of War (2007) Developed by Gear Games
- Aces of the Luftwaffe (2009) Developed by HandyGames
- Air Penguin (2011) Developed by Enterfly
- ADVENA (2011)
- Arel Wars (2011)
- Arel Wars 2 (2012)

B

- Baseball Superstars 2007 (2007)
- Big Trouble On Little Earth (2007)
- Bulldozer Inc. (2007) Developed by HandyGames
- Baseball Superstars 2008 (2008)
- Baseball Superstars 2009 (2008)
- Bridge Bloxx (2008) Developed by HandyGames
- Baseball Superstars 2010 (2009)
- Boom It Up! (2009)
- Baseball Superstars 2011 (2010)
- Baseball Superstars 2012 (2011)
- Baseball Superstars 2013 (2013)

C

- Cartoon Wars (Spring 2009)
- Cartoon Wars: Gunner (Fall 2009)
- Cartoon Wars 2 (2010)
- Cartoon Wars: Blade! (2012)
- Cartoon Wars 3 (2015)

D

- Destinia (2011)
- DESTINIA (2011)
- Dark Avenger (2013)
- Darkness Reborn (2014)
- Dragon Blaze (2015)
- Devilian (2016)

E

- Elune Saga (2015)

F

- Fantasy Warlord (2014)

G

- GT Drift:Untouchable (2007)
- Game Pack for Her (2008) Developed by Com2Us
- Golf Superstars 2008 (2008)
- Gothic 3: The Beginning (2008) Developed by HandyGames
- Gardius Empire (2018)

H

- HYBRID: Eternal Whisper (2009)
- HYBRID 2: Saga of Nostalgia (2010)

I

- Illusia (2010)

K

- Kami Retro (2011)
- Kaizin Rumble (2013)
- Kritika (2014)
- Kingdom of War (2016)
- Knight Slinger (2016)

L

- Left Brain Bytes (2008)

M

- Mini-Lovey (2006)
- My Monster Pet (2008)
- Monster Warlord (2012)
- Million Arthur (2015) by Square Enix

N

- NOM (2006)
- NOM 2: Free Runner (2008)
- NOM: Billion Year Timequest (2010)

O

- Omega Squadron 3D (2007)

P

- Path of a Warrior:Imperial Blood (2006)
- Plants War (2012)
- Punch Hero

R

- ROCKin' Stone (2007)

S

- Skipping Stone (2005)
- Skipping Stone IQ (2007)
- Skipping Stone IQ: Holiday Edition (2007)
- Super Boom Boom (2007)
- Super Boom Boom: Holiday Edition (2007)
- Super Action Hero (2008) Developed by Com2Us
- Soccer Superstars (2010)
- Soccer Superstars 2011 (2011)
- Spirit Stones (2013) Developed by Enterfly

T

- Traffic Mayhem (2006)
- The Egyptians (2008)
- The Shroud (2008) Developed by Your World Games
- Tower Defense (2008) Developed by Com2Us
- Toy Shot (2011)
- The Walking Dead: All-Stars (2022)

W

- War of Crown (2017)

Z

- ZENONIA (2009)
- ZENONIA 2 (2010)
- ZENONIA 3 (2011)
- ZENONIA 4 (2011)
- ZENONIA 5 (2012)
- Zenonia S: Rifts in Time (2016)
