= Zenonia 4 =

2011 video game

Zenonia 4: Return of the Legend
- Developer(s): Gamevil
- Publisher(s): Gamevil
- Series: Zenonia
- Platform(s): Android, iOS
- Release: Android; February 13, 2012 iOS; December 22, 2011
- Genre(s): Action RPG
- Mode(s): Single-player, multiplayer

Zenonia 4: Return of the Legend is an action role-playing game created, developed, and published by Gamevil for the Android and iOS. It is the sequel to Zenonia 3 and the fourth game in the Zenonia series. It was released on the App Store on December 22, 2011, on Google Play on February 13, 2012, and on the Amazon Appstore on May 4, 2012.

== Gameplay ==
Zenonia 4 follows the same general gameplay formula of its predecessors, including real-time combat and exploration. You control the protagonist, Regret, with the virtual d-pad. Along with main quests that advance the central story, the player is able to accept side-quests from non-player characters (NPCs) in towns and other locations. The game has four available classes to choose from: Slayer (a powerful melee-class fighter), Blader (a melee-class fighter with quick attacks), Ranger (a ranged-class with wide-area targeting), and Druid (a ranged-class specializing in projectile attacks). The game features Zen, an in-game currency that can be purchased using real-world currency to buy powerful and helpful in-game items. For example, Dragon's breath is in the shop, increasing the refinement level of an item by 3, and there is also 'Auto-Routing', making you automatically pick up (dropped) items on the screen. Gold is also featured, the main in-game currency. This is used to buy, combine, refine, and other things with. This is used to by level 5-20 items, to buy scrolls to combine for better items, and buy ingredients to make that. The player can compete in online 2-on-2 or 1-on-1 battles. There are also trials, where you can pay to play, and where you either play 1-player or 2-player co-op. You battle increasingly stronger monsters, gaining a large amount of experience, and also getting a prize if you beat all of the levels/monsters.

== Synopsis ==
The protagonist of the first Zenonia game, Regret, returns as the protagonist for Zenonia 4. Ten years after the events of Zenonia 3, Regret is trapped in a world called Land of the Fallen, a world that is between death and consciousness. Regret is approached by his future self to warn him of a dark lord that is rising and threatening the land of Zenonia. With the help of the fairy Anya, Regret seeks to stop the rise of the dark lord and save Zenonia.

== Reception ==
Reception

Aggregate score
Aggregator	Score
Metacritic	77/100

Review scores
Publication	Score
148 Apps	4/5
AppSafari	5/5
Pocket Gamer	7/10
Slide to Play	3/4

The overall reception to Zenonia 4 has been positive. It has received a 77/100 on the review aggregator site Metacritic, indicating generally favorable reviews. Slide to Play gave the game a 3/4, complimenting its deep RPG elements but criticizing it for its reliance on grinding and fetch-quests. Pocket Gamer gave the game a 7/10 and a Bronze award, with praise going toward its graphics but criticized the game for adhering too closely to the formula of its predecessors. AppSafari, on the other hand, was more positive in its assessment, giving the game a 5/5 and saying that, "...this is definitely, hands down, the best installment in the series. And I’ll even go a bit further and say that this is one of the best games to ever be released as an application on the iPhone."
