= Verizon Center =

Verizon Center may refer to:

- Verizon Center (Mankato, Minnesota), now Mayo Clinic Health System Event Center, a multi-purpose arena in Mankato, Minnesota
- Verizon Center (Washington, D.C.), now Capital One Arena

== See also ==
- Verizon Arena, now Simmons Bank Arena, in Little Rock, Arkansas
- Verizon Wireless Arena, now SNHU Arena, in Manchester, New Hampshire
