= CHPP =

CHPP may refer to:

- Certified Homeland Protection Professional, a certification in homeland security
- Coal handling and preparation plant, another term for a coal preparation plant
- Combined heat and power plant, a term for a cogeneration facility
- Continuous hyperthermic peritoneal perfusion, a procedure in which the abdominal cavity is bathed in warm fluid that contains anticancer drugs
- Certified Hattrick Product Providers, functions that work with the Hattrick massively multiplayer online football management game
