= Air Penguin =

2011 video game

- App icon
- Developer(s): Enterfly
- Publisher(s): Gamevil
- Platform(s): iOS, Android
- Release: iOS; April 14, 2011; Android; November 30, 2011
- Genre(s): Action
- Mode(s): Single-player

Air Penguin is a vertically scrolling video game developed by Enterfly and published by Gamevil for iOS and Android in 2011.

== Reception ==
Reception

Aggregate score
Aggregator	Score
Metacritic	82/100

Review scores
Publication	Score
Destructoid	7.5/10
Gamezebo	90/100
IGN	8/10
Jeuxvideo.com	17/20
Macworld	4/5 stars
Pocket Gamer	4/5 stars
TouchArcade	4/5 stars
Common Sense Media	3/5 stars

The iOS version received "favorable" reviews according to the review aggregation website Metacritic. The Washington Post called the game "cute and fun, but frustrating for commuters who may get jostled while playing."
