= Zenonia =

2008 video game

- Developer: Gamevil
- Publisher: Gamevil
- Series: Zenonia
- Platforms: iOS, Android, Windows Mobile, DSiWare, Bada, PlayStation Portable, Zeebo
- Release: Mobile; August 28, 2008 (South Korea); September 16, 2009 (Europe) iOS; May 24, 2009 (USA); Zeebo; October 31, 2009 (Brazil); November 4, 2009 (Mexico); Android; March 27, 2010 (world-wide); DSiWare: NA: September 27, 2010; PAL: December 24, 2010; PSP: NA: October 12, 2010; EU: February 16, 2011; PC: NA: August 31, 2026; EU: August 31, 2026
- Genre: Action role-playing game
- Mode: Single-player

Zenonia (Korean: 제노니아) is an action role-playing game created, developed, and published by Gamevil for iOS, Android, PlayStation Portable, Nintendo DSi, Zeebo and Windows Mobile. It was released on the App Store on May 24, 2009 and on the Google Play Store on March 27, 2010. It was released for the PlayStation Portable on October 12, 2010. A PC port was released onto Steam by Com2us Holdings on 31 Aug 2026.

== Gameplay ==
The main character, Regret, is controlled through use of an on-screen d-pad, which is located in the lower left corner of the screen. There are many side quests that the player can choose to complete in order to further explore the world. The main storyline can be changed by the player depending on whether they decide to make certain choices that will cause their character's alignment to shift more quickly towards good or evil. There are three classes in which the player can choose from: Paladin, Warrior, or Assassin, each having a unique fighting style. The game also features hundreds of different weapons, and a full class skill tree for each of the classes. Gamevil claims that Zenonia has 40 hours of gameplay.

Regret's in-game appearance changes based upon his equipped weapon and armor set.

== Synopsis ==
Zenonia's protagonist is Regret, a young man whose origins are initially unknown. His primary mission in the game is to find the reason for the death of his adoptive father, Pardon, at the hands of a demon and subsequently a more powerful evil that is at work.

== Development and release ==
Zenonia was developed and published by Gamevil. It is a port of a mobile game from South Korea. Much of the time spent porting the game to iPhone was spent on translation.

Version 1.1 was released on June 29, 2009. The update improved the touch controls as well as making certain on-screen buttons larger and semi-transparent, making them easier to press accurately without restricting the view of the in-game action. Also, the need to eat and repair weapons and armor has been decreased in order to improve the overall playability of the game by lowering the frequency with which the player must return to towns. Features of Apple's iOS 3.0, which was released on June 17, 2009, were implemented into the game as well, allowing the user to listen to MP3s in lieu of the in-game soundtrack.

The game was also translated to Portuguese (Brazil) and released for the Zeebo, a Brazilian video-game in January 2010.

Zenonia was released for the Android OS on March 27, 2010. It supports both HVGA and WVGA screen resolutions and runs on Android versions 1.5 and greater. It was later released for Nintendo's DSiWare in North America on September 27, 2010, and in the PAL region on December 24, 2010. On October 12, 2010, it was also released on the PSP.

Com2us announced on 8 May 2026 it would release a Windows port via Steam. A demo was release as part of Steam Next Fest. It was released on 31 August 2026.

== Reception ==
Reception

Aggregate score
Aggregator	Score
GameRankings	iOS: 84%

Review scores
Publication	Score
IGN	9.0/10
VideoGamer.com	8/10
Pocket Gamer	8/10
Slide to Play	4/4

Zenonia has largely received positive reviews and has been compared graphically with earlier games in The Legend of Zelda and Final Fantasy series. The game's script has been praised for being well-written and humorous. PC Magazine named the game as one of the "must-have" games for iPhone. Tracy Erickson of Pocket Gamer gave it a Silver Award, calling it "vintage role-playing at its zenith". Pocket Gamer also awarded it Best Adventure/RPG Game for iPhone in 2010.

== Sequels ==
Gamevil developed a sequel to Zenonia, Zenonia 2: The Lost Memories. It features four new characters with their own special abilities and combat tactics: Lu, the paladin (melee class), Ecne, the shooter (gunner class), Morpice, the magician (ranged mage class), and Daza, the warrior (melee class). The sequel features a new interface for character customization with over 1200 new items which, in addition to raising your character's fighting statistics, change his or her appearance. New landscapes have also been added to challenge the player even more than in the prior game. New terrain include ice to skid across, ledges to climb and flowing lava. The game also features player versus player (PvP) battles in a small arena. Each of the game's four towns have a different Arena layout.

The sequel was released in the iOS App Store on March 29, 2010, and the Google Play Store on December 24, 2010.

A further sequel, Zenonia 3, was released in the Apple App Store on April 28, 2011, and the Google Play Store on August 1, 2011.

The sequel to Zenonia 3, called Zenonia 4, was released in Korea on September 26, 2011. It was released in the Apple App Store on December 22, 2011, and in the Google Play Store on February 10, 2012

Zenonia 5 was released in the Google Play Store on November 29, 2012. The iOS version was released on January 10, 2013.

The next sequel after Zenonia 5 is Zenonia S, released in worldwide in both the Google Play Store and App Store in July 2015.
