= Lady Popular =

2009 video game

- Developer: XS Software
- Release: November 2009
- Platform: Web browser Android iOS
- Available in: 21 languages
- Type: Fashion (Dress-up), Casual game
- Website: ladypopular.com

Lady Popular is a freemium, online fashion game for iOS and Android developed by the Bulgarian software company XS Software. The game was originally released at the end of 2009, and in August 2012, the second major version was officially released as a separate game under the name Lady Popular Fashion Arena. It is recommended for ages 13 and up. Lady Popular is a casual dress-up game that aims primarily at a female audience. It has been translated into 21 languages and has over 8 million registered users.

== Gameplay ==
Each player begins the game by creating her female character, called "Lady". After the creation of the Ladies, a player can change her appearance (hairstyle, makeup, etc.), create clothes for Lady, rent an apartment and decorate it, cooperate with other players in clubs and party missions, communicate with other Players, play duels at Fashion Arena, communicate using them in the game, post comments and chat, increase their popularity and compete with them in the competition for the best lady, the best apartment and the best party.

=== Starting the game ===
To start a game, the user must register. The player creates their 'Lady' by choosing her initial appearance (eyes, lips, hair, etc.) and name. At the beginning of the game, there is a tutorial that guides the player through the game and rewards them for completing the quests successfully. Players are allowed only one account; having multiple accounts violates the game rules. Breaking any of the rules may result in a punishment of up to five years' suspension or ban from the game.

=== City ===
City is the in-game dashboard that provides access to the major in-game destinations:

- Beauty salon - where the player can change their Lady's look and fiance/husband after getting engaged
- Mall - where the player can go shopping for clothes for the Lady
- Boutique - where the player can unlock old collections
- Clubs - where the player can find a virtual boyfriend for the Lady
- Furniture shop - where the player can buy furniture and use them for apartment decorations
- Pet shop - where the player can purchase virtual pets and clothes for them
- Party center - where the player can organize their engagement party and invite other players to it, you can also organize a wedding after having your engagement party and invite players to it
- Jobs - This feature has since been taken away after the update and now is not available
- Carnival - where the player can take part in a virtual Auction, win rewards from Lucky cards, and play for special clothes and furniture in Fashion machine.

=== Fashion Arena ===
Fashion Arena is the main game feature in Lady Popular Fashion Arena that gives the player opportunity to win dollars (for shopping) and experience (for leveling up) in the game. On the Fashion arena the player chooses an opponent Lady and both Ladies compare their Popularity. Popularity is made up of 6 indexes - Creativity, Style, Devotion, Beauty, Generosity, and Loyalty which the player increases throughout their game. They can also activate search to find opponents easier. It costs 3 diamonds for one week, and 10 diamonds for a month. Sometimes, each of the players in the challenge has a higher popularity status than they do. They can only challenge players within 5 levels of their own (ex: If level 20, they can challenge levels 15-25). If they challenge someone higher than their level and win, not only do they receive Dollars, but also experience. It varies how much money they win by how much their opponent has. You can't challenge the same person more than once until after 2 hours within the challenge. You have 10 energy if it is fully refilled, each taking 15 minutes, meaning 2 hours and 30 minutes until you are fully refreshed. You can also go to the VIP shop and increase the max energy level to 10, which takes a total of 2 hours and 45 minutes to fully refill. When you level up, you are automatically refilled.

=== Contests (podiums) ===
In Lady Popular there are different weekly and monthly contests for the most beautiful Lady, apartment, and pet. In Lady Popular Fashion Arena the pet contest is removed and a party contest is added. Every player can compete for their place in any of the podium contests. The player can interact with the other players by voting for their Ladies and this way increase or decrease their rating. At the end of the voting period (week or month), the Ladies with the highest ratings take their place on the respective podium and get rewards, all Ladies' ratings are reset and a new contest competition starts. Once a Lady has won all trophies (gold, silver, and bronze), in a contest, Ladies are no longer able to vote for them. There is a top 50, and each contest has a different reset time. The three contests are the Lady Podium, which resets every Wednesday, FTV Catwalk, which resets every first day of the month, and finally, the Apartment contest which resets every Monday. The Lady Podium and FTV Catwalk when won, will receive emeralds and a unique crown for the top 3. The Apartment contest winners receive statuettes. Votes are from -2 to 3, the players can increase from -1 to 4 in a limited time from the VIP shop.

=== Lady Clubs ===
Lady clubs is a feature added to Lady Popular Fashion Arena in July, 2013 that gives the players an option to play together as a team. Every player can either create their own Lady club or can join an already existing one. The player who creates the club will automatically be president and have all the options to do more things. Members can become vice president if they are promoted only by the President. The President can pass down their positions to anyone in their club. Vice President(s) have the second most options, and least, the Members. The President is marked with hot pink, Vice Presidents, marked as pink, and members, marked as yellow when viewing members of the club. All Members can donate Dollars, Emeralds, and Diamonds to help out with the club. Using the money, the President and Vice President(s) can purchase tomatoes and eggs to help defeat other clubs. They can also use it to increase the club's skills. Gaining more skills makes them more popular, allowing them to do more things. The maximum popularity for each club is 200, maximum members, 50. There is no limit to how many Vice Presidents there can be. Every Lady club has stats that have to be increased by the Club members so they could have a better chance for in-game bonuses and winning club fights. Club fights are team duels organized by the president of the Lady club. The Club president can choose an opponent Lady club and set a date and time for the club fight. All the Club members can join the club fight, thus they have a better chance to win the fight and steal a trophy (if any) from the opponent Lady club for extra bonuses. Each trophy decreases each members' popularity by 10% in fights. If your club is receiving the attack, all members will automatically participate in the club.

=== Parties ===
After introducing the Party feature in Lady Popular Fashion Arena, the players can organize their engagement in-game parties and invite other players to them. To host an engagement party every player must complete different steps for the planning - rent and decorate the room where the party will be held, choose foods and drinks for the party, choose outfits for their Lady, and her fiancé, etc. The party organizer can also create their invitations which can be sent to the other players so they could join the party. During the party the participants team up to complete different group missions with rewards, communicate using the party chat and vote for the party.

== Awards ==
Best Browser Game of the Year, 2013

- First place in Favorite Community Game

Best Browser Game of the Year, 2012

- First place in Favorite Community Game
- Second place in Most popular
- Second place in Best 2D

Best Browser Game of the Year, 2011

- First place in Favorite Community Game

Best Browser Game of the Year, 2010

- First place in Favorite Community Game
- Second place in Most Popular
