= Nemexia (video game) =

2009 video game

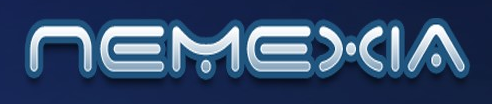
- Developer: XS Software
- Initial release: November 2009
- Stable release: 5.0 / 12 November 2014; 11 years ago
- Written in: PHP
- Platform: Web browser
- Available in: 18 languages
- Type: Space Strategy Game
- Licence: Freemium
- Website: www.nemexia.com

Nemexia is a browser-based, massive multi-player online space strategy game. Each player can choose from one of three races and develop their powerful space empire. With the assistance of their friends they can conquer the Universe by constructing the Supreme Starway Gate (SSG).

== History ==
Nemexia is a free-to-play browser-based game and was released in September 2009, initially only in Bulgaria. It was developed and released by the Bulgarian company XS Software. By the end of the same year the game has been released in 13 different countries with over 120,000 registered players.

== Versions ==
The game has experienced several major changes during the years and each of these changes is labeled with a specific name.

- Nemexia 2.0 - Evolution (2011) - Introduced a new commanding unit - Admiral, Commander Ships and a fully improved game interface.
- Nemexia 3.0 - Apocalypse (2012) - Introduced a new alien threat – Renegades, a new breed of defense units and an improved battle system.
- Nemexia 4.0 - Redemption (2013) - Introduced blueprints for two new Commander ships and crafting for Admiral equipment.
- Nemexia 5.0 - Supremacy (2014) - Introduced the Galaxy Arena, a mighty place for cross-universe battles.

== Plot ==
Many years ago the humans discovered space travel and decided to explore the galaxy. A small group calling themselves "The Confederation" discovered an ancient planet with unlimited resources which helped them develop their technical potential. It took them some time, but finally they have managed to create an AI so profound that it developed a free will. They have called these creatures "Terteths". With time passing these robots were assisting the Confederation in everything. Realizing their own potential the Terteths formed a Union and separate themselves from the Confederation. Few of them stayed as assistants to their masters but the others were curious about the rest of the universe, just like their creators. In their distant journeys the Terteths discovered another intelligent race at the far end of their Galaxy, Insect-like creatures they called "Noxis". Blinded by their eagerness for knowledge, the Terteths and the Confederation did not notice that the Noxis had started to evolve. Like many other creatures the Noxis were parasites, linking with an unsuspected source they would drain information and eventually overtake their host. War has started. The three races were in constant conflict. The end was not near and some outcasts, less hostile communities separated from their people. They formed alliances and combined their knowledge in a final effort to escape. The player can help the outcasts in their quest.

== Gameplay ==
Nemexia is a round-based game, which means that after the Game Goal is reached all players start from scratch and compete for victory once again.

During each round, players can colonize up to six planets and spread their space empires over several galaxies. Each planet can be developed individually as a supporting, mining or war planet . Even if a planet is lost in battle, players can colonize new planets and choose their strategies once again.

=== Races and Units ===
Nemexia has three different races: Humans (Confederation), Robots (Terteths Union) and Insects/Living creatures (Noxis). Each race has its specific type of units with unique skills.

The diversity of ships and defense units allows players to choose from several different battle strategies. There are seven types of warships, five civilian, and one service ship. There are also seven types of defense units which can be used to defend planets if players' ships are on a mission. Players who prefer not to construct war units may choose to construct one or two planet shields, which can defend their planets from some of the weaker ships and prevent raids.

=== Science ===
There are 22 different sciences that are in greater assistance to the players in certain moments of their development. Because of the great distances between the different planets, players can increase their ship's speed up to 750%, which makes reaching the desired location faster. There are sciences that can increase resource and energy income, provide additional attack or health to the players' units or unlock hidden secrets and plans for developing the master units.

=== Alliances and Team Planets ===
Player can join existing alliances or create their own alliances, and with the assistance of eight friends from the other races, players can create a powerful Team Planet. From these Team Planets, all alliance members can launch an attack toward a Sun and try to obtain a Crystal. By collecting all 10 crystals players unlock a unique building which allows them to compete for the Game Goal.
