= Cartoon Wars (video game) =

- Developers: BLUE G&C
- Publishers: Imangi Studios and Gamevil
- Platforms: iOS, Android
- Release: 2009
- Mode: Single-player

Cartoon Wars is a video game made by BLUE G&C and Gamevil USA released in Spring 2009 for Android and iOS.

== Gameplay ==
The gameplay is based on sending out soldiers from one's tower to defeat the enemy tower. That tower and the soldiers there get stronger each wave defeated, but players can upgrade their soldiers, recruit new ones, add more HP to their tower, increase their magical power, and more by obtaining gold.

== Reception ==
The gameplay has been described as "addictive" and "strategic", but its graphics have been criticized in later updates.

== Sequels ==
The game has seen four sequels: Cartoon Wars: Blade, Cartoon Wars: Gunner, Cartoon Wars 2: Heroes and Cartoon Wars 3.
