= Legends of Zork =

2009 video game

- Developer: Jolt Online Gaming
- Platform: Web browser
- Release: April 1, 2009
- Genre: Adventure

Legends of Zork was a browser-based online adventure game based on the Zork universe created by software company Infocom.

== Production ==
A Zork massively multiplayer online game was originally announced in January, 2009. However, the developers recanted that MMO statement, calling it a "casual adventure game", instead. Game mechanics were similar to those of Kingdom of Loathing, and there was no charge to sign up.

== Premise and gameplay ==
Players controlled a recently fired traveling salesman for FrobozzCo International, now fighting monsters and solving puzzles for zorkmids (the world's currency). A class, leveling, equipment and skill system give each character unique attributes. Free accounts were given 30 action points per day, but could pay a fee to receive more and other "perks".

Upon defeating monsters, players may have recovered enchanted Double Fanucci cards which could be arranged into four-card hands called "gambits", which enhanced types of skills. In addition, having face cards in a gambit could provide other enhancements, like additional hit points or inventory capacity. Legends of Zork's Double Fanucci cards were drawn by artist Greg Brown and colored by Jim "Zubby" Zubkavich.

== Critical reception ==
Legends of Zork received mixed reactions from the gaming community, with many reviews complaining that the game was not true to the original Zork.

Alec Meer of Rock, Paper, Shotgun criticized the game, saying it's "as though someone designed a micropayment system then awkwardly shoved a very crude game on top of it." Meer goes on to describe the game as "rudimentary" and "unfunny."

Kenneth Newquist of nuketown.com called it "a barebones MMORPG-style game designed for the casual gamer" which was all about number crunching, although pointed out that it was not necessarily a bad thing, comparing the game to the Facebook app D&D Tiny Adventures. He criticised the lack of a story within the game, but admitted that later additions to the game in the form of quests came some way to fixing this problem. He also said "Still, it is Zork-like. The locations, the artwork, and the tone all evoke the Infocom games I loved." He conceded that while it did not come up to his expectations (although he was still playing it several months after release), other players might, and thought that as "an amusing little app, and as a lunch time diversion, I think it works."

== Game closure ==
Jolt Online Gaming quickly killed off the game on May 31, 2011 without any warning notice to its adventurers.
