= SummitX Snowboarding =

2011 video game

- Game Icon
- Developer: Free Range Games
- Publisher: Com2uS
- Engine: Unity 3D
- Platforms: iOS, Android
- Release: December 15, 2011
- Genre: Snowboarding
- Mode: Single-player

SummitX Snowboarding is a snowboarding video game from Com2us developed by Free Range Games.

== Gameplay ==
The snowboard shown in this image is an Automaton Snowboards Extra Dangerous design.

SummitX Snowboarding includes 3D terrain with 36 multi-branching runs on 6 mountains. Players choose between a male and female character. The characters perform tricks such as spins, flips, and rolls. Each trick earns the player a time bonus that allows the player more time to get to the bottom of the mountain. SummitX Snowboarding features HD quality graphics and realistic game physics.
