= First National Bank of Mankato =

- U.S. National Register of Historic Places
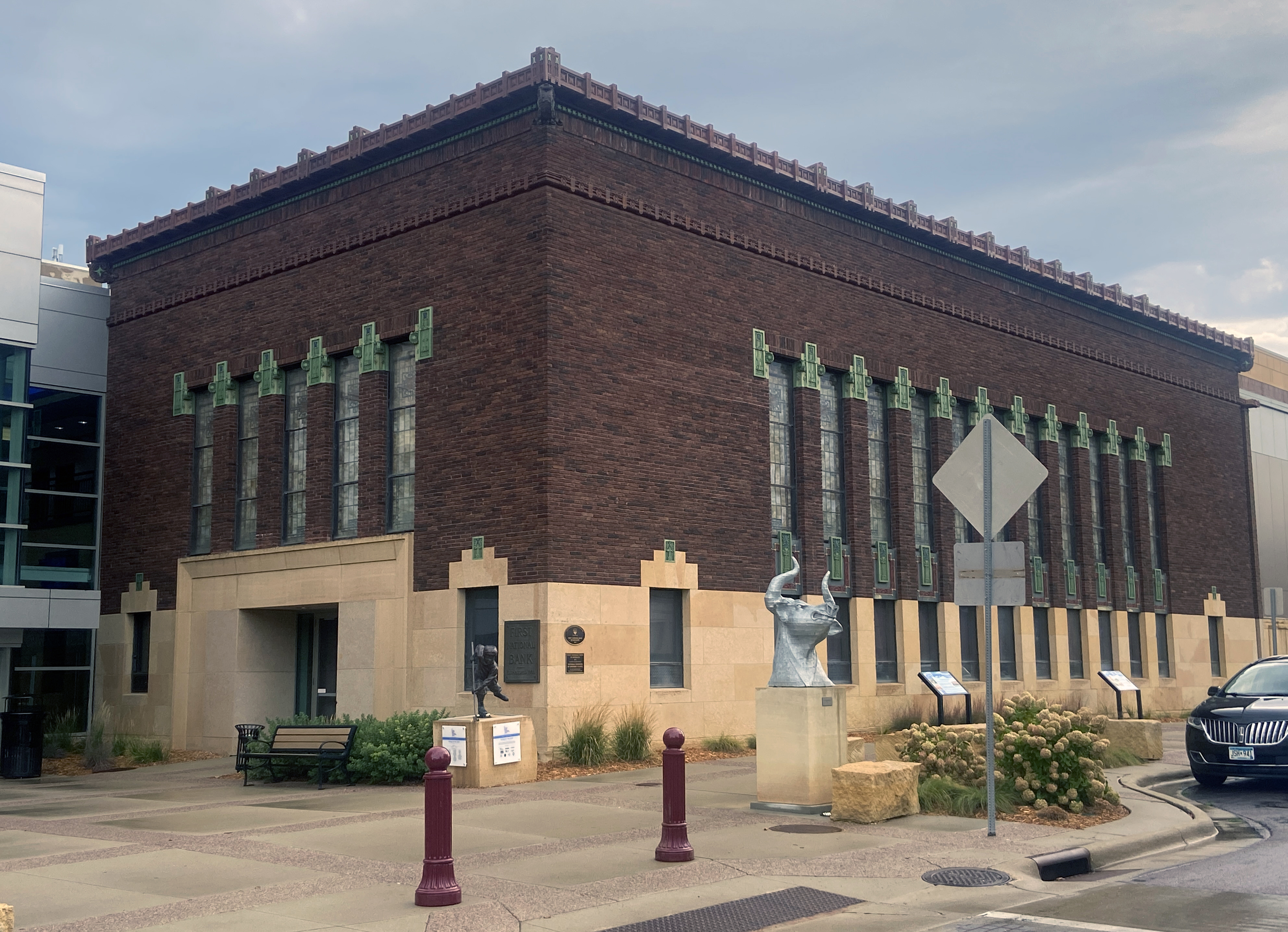

- Location within Minnesota Location within the United States
- Location: 229 S. Front St., Mankato, Minnesota
- Coordinates: 44°09′59.9″N 94°00′13.7″W
- Area: less than one acre
- Built: 1913
- Architect: Ellerbe & Round
- Architectural style: Prairie School
- MPS: Blue Earth County MRA (AD)
- NRHP reference No.: 74001004
- Added to NRHP: July 30, 1974

The First National Bank of Mankato, also known as the Old First National Bank of Mankato and located at 229 South Front Street in Mankato, Minnesota, United States, is a fine example of Prairie School architecture in a commercial building, relating rural life to the development of downtown Mankato as a regional center of commerce and finance. The recently restored exterior is now part of the Mankato Civic Center, the Mayo Clinic Health System Event Center.

== History ==
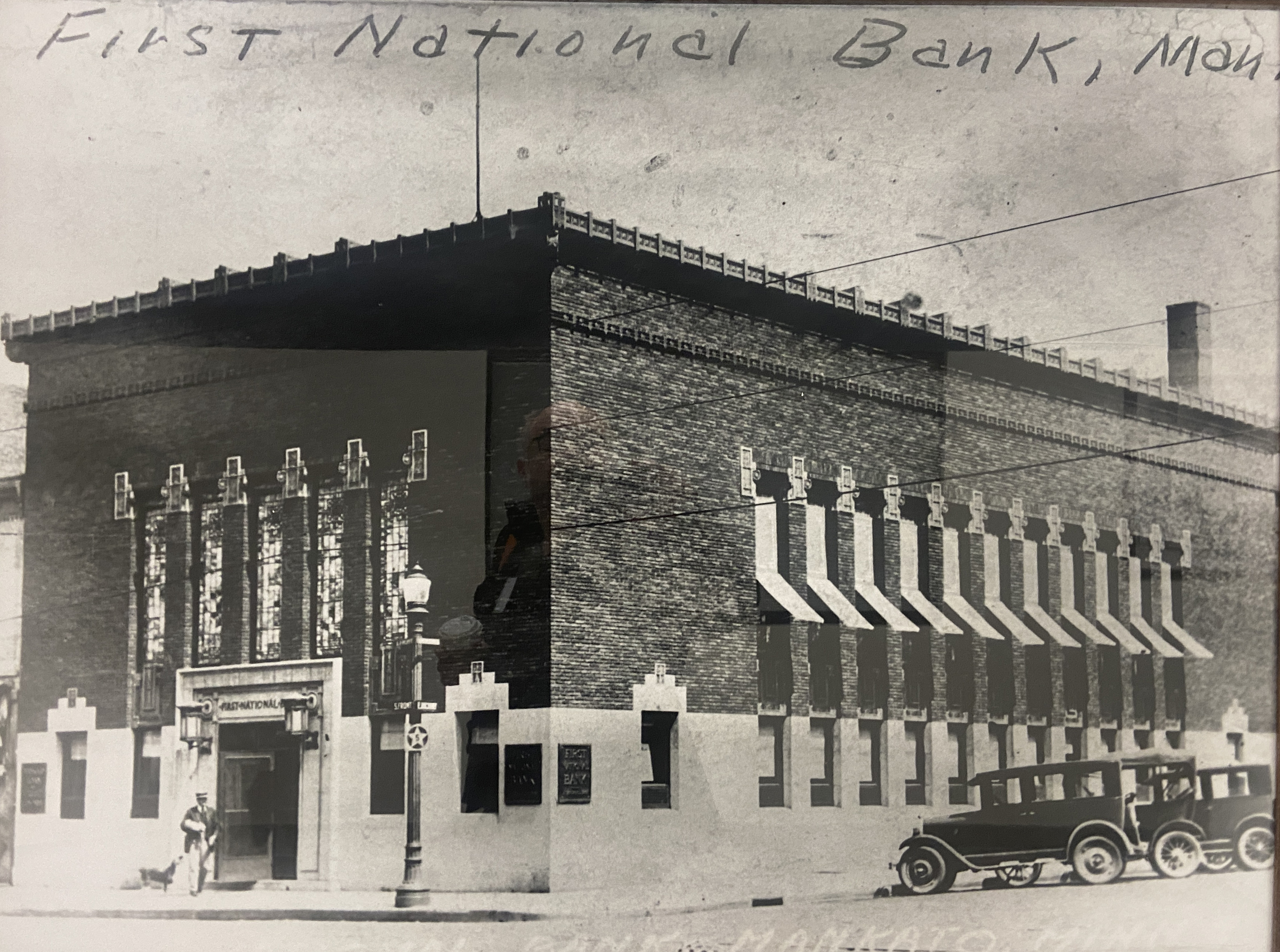
First National Bank of Mankato, c. 1913

Mankato was settled by Anglo European pioneers beginning in 1852. The region had been occupied by the Sisseton "Lake Village" Santee Sioux. The year before they signed the Treaty of Traverse des Sioux ceding their lands to the U.S Government for annuities. Afterwards Mankato experienced rapid growth, strategically located on the main transportation artery serving region, the Minnesota River. The influx of commerce and people sprouted stores, hotels, quarries and other commercial ventures. "Crucial to these businesses, and the agro economy of Blue Earth County, were Mankato's banks."

The First National Bank of Mankato was one of the three competing financial institutions in the early 20th century, along with the Citizens' National Bank and the Mankato State Bank (previously the Mankato National Bank). The First National Bank went into history as the target of the famous aborted robbery by Jesse James and the James-Younger Gang in 1876.

Looking for a new building, First National Bank officials approached Carl K. Bennett of Owatonna, Minnesota where the acclaimed Louis H. Sullivan Prairie School bank had been built. In 1912 he connected them with the famous Minneapolis-based architectural firm of Purcell and Elmslie, both of whom had worked and studied under Sullivan. According to several accounts, Purcell and Elmslie drew extensive blue prints for the proposed building providing them to bank officials for review. Later informed by mail that the bank would not be using them, they requested that their prints be returned. The sketches were, but only after a protracted delay. During which time the bank hired the architects Ellerbe and Round who made drawings very similar to the Purcell and Elmslie submissions.

The 1913 Ellerbee and Round construction made so much use of the Purcell and Elmslie sketches that Purcell and Elmslie even received congratulatory letters from some who had assumed the design was theirs as it said "Purcell and Elmslie". Although closely following the Purcell and Elmslie drawings Ellerbe and Round did eliminate a landscaped forecourt and a deep arch in the facade similar to what Purcell and Elmslie had used on their design of the First National Bank (Rhinelander, Wisconsin).

Ellerbe and Round would go on to become famous for designing a number of structures for the Mayo Clinic, including the original "Red" Building of 1914.

Originally occupying the prominent corner of Front Street South and West Hickory Street, the First National Bank building was threatened with demolition. Instead, the exterior has been restored and incorporated into the south side of the Mayo Clinic Health System Event Center as one of the center's event spaces. With that portion of Front Street gone, the restored bank exterior can now be accessed at approximately 105 West Hickory Street.

== Architecture ==
The First National Bank building includes Mankato limestone, brick, and terra cotta in a manner similar to that of the "jewel box" banks of Louis Sullivan or the banks of his former employees, William Gray Purcell and George Elmslie. The brick building's architectural features include Frank Lloyd Wright-inspired stained glass windows and intricate ornamentation at the roof-line.

Even though David Gebhard and Tom Martinson conclude that the resulting building lacks the "liveliness" of a work by Sullivan or by Purcell and Elmslie, they consider it "a good academic exercise in the Prairie Style" and "the most important single building in Mankato."

== Gallery ==
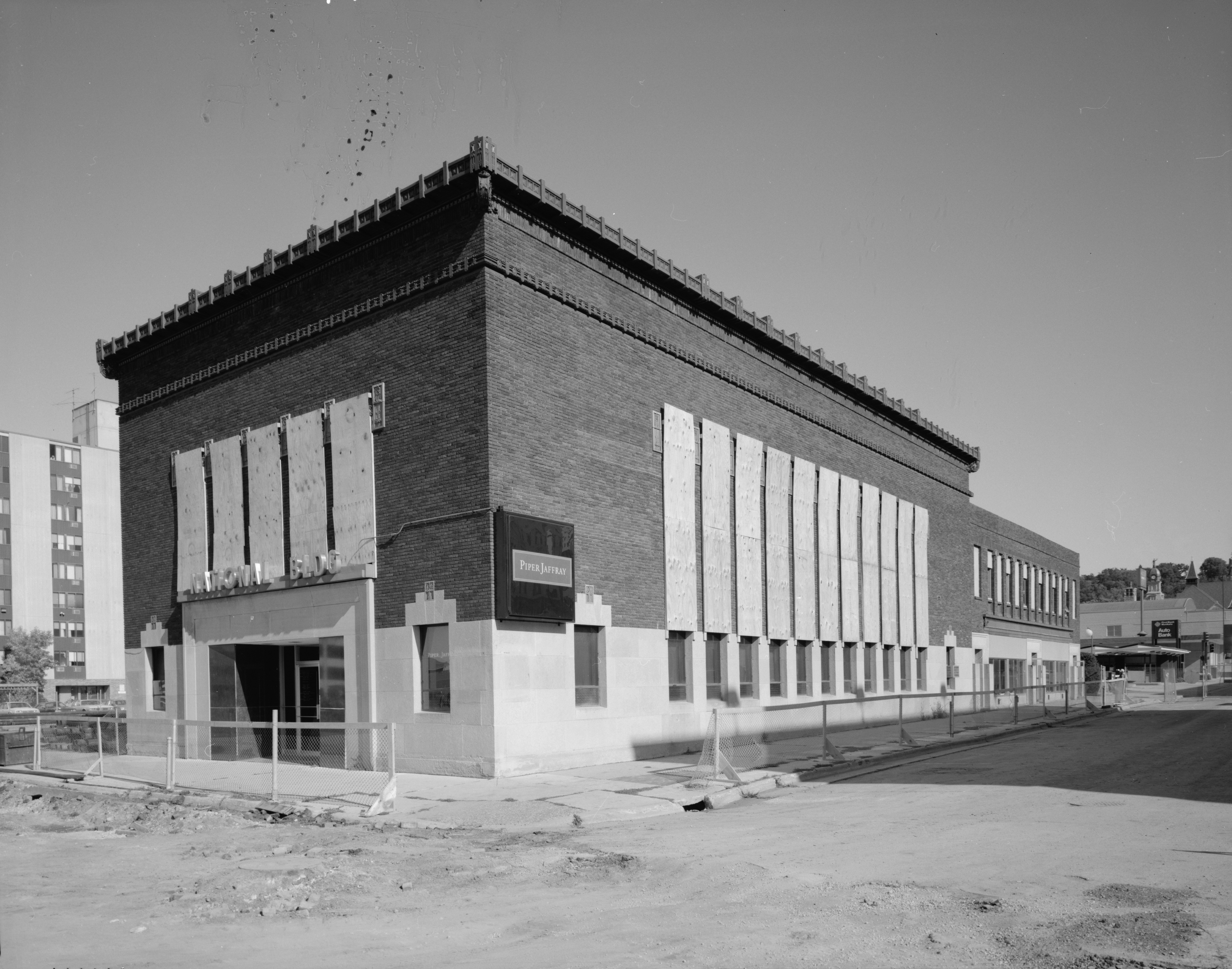
The bank building before restoration

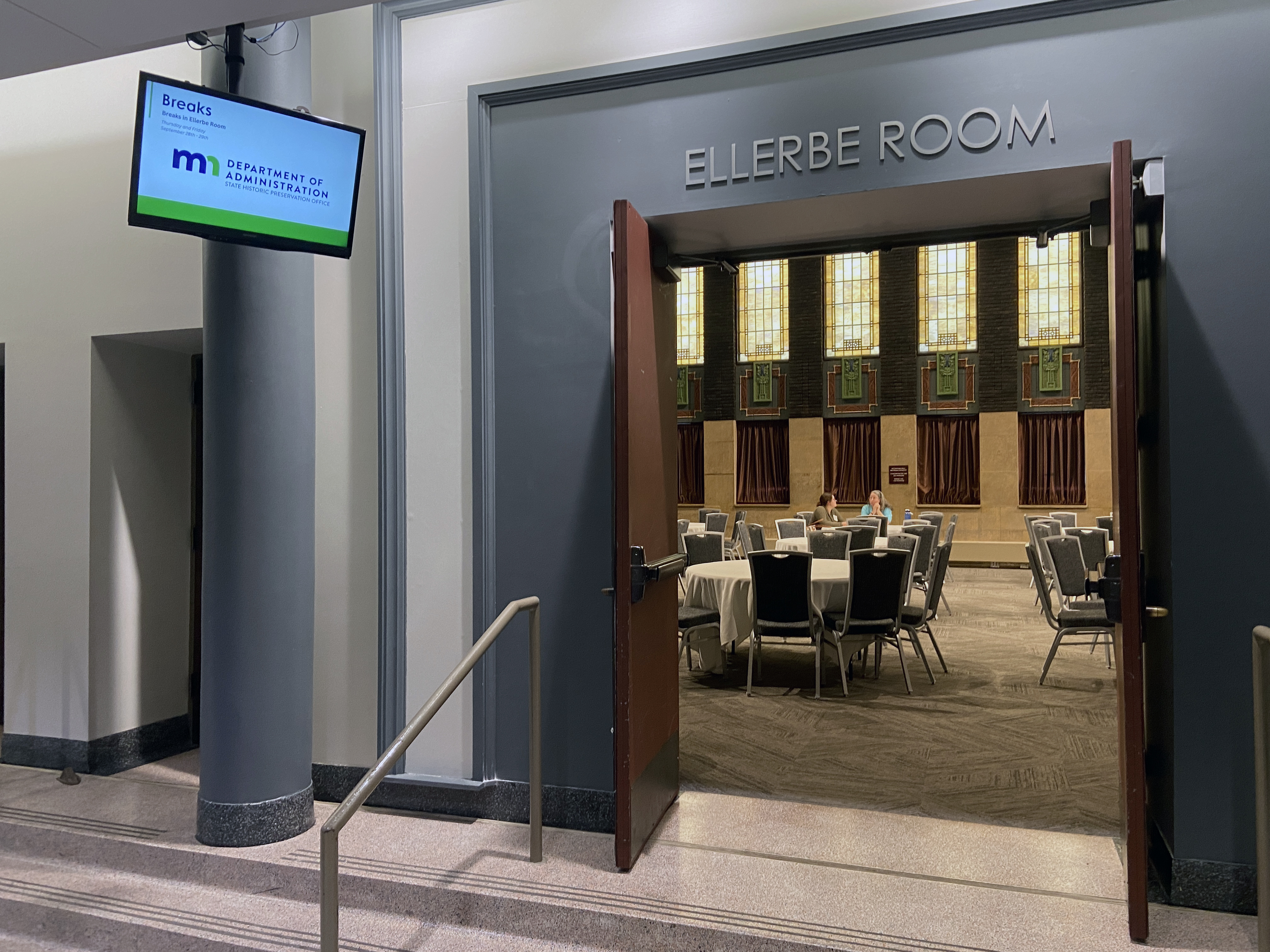
Interior transition from event center

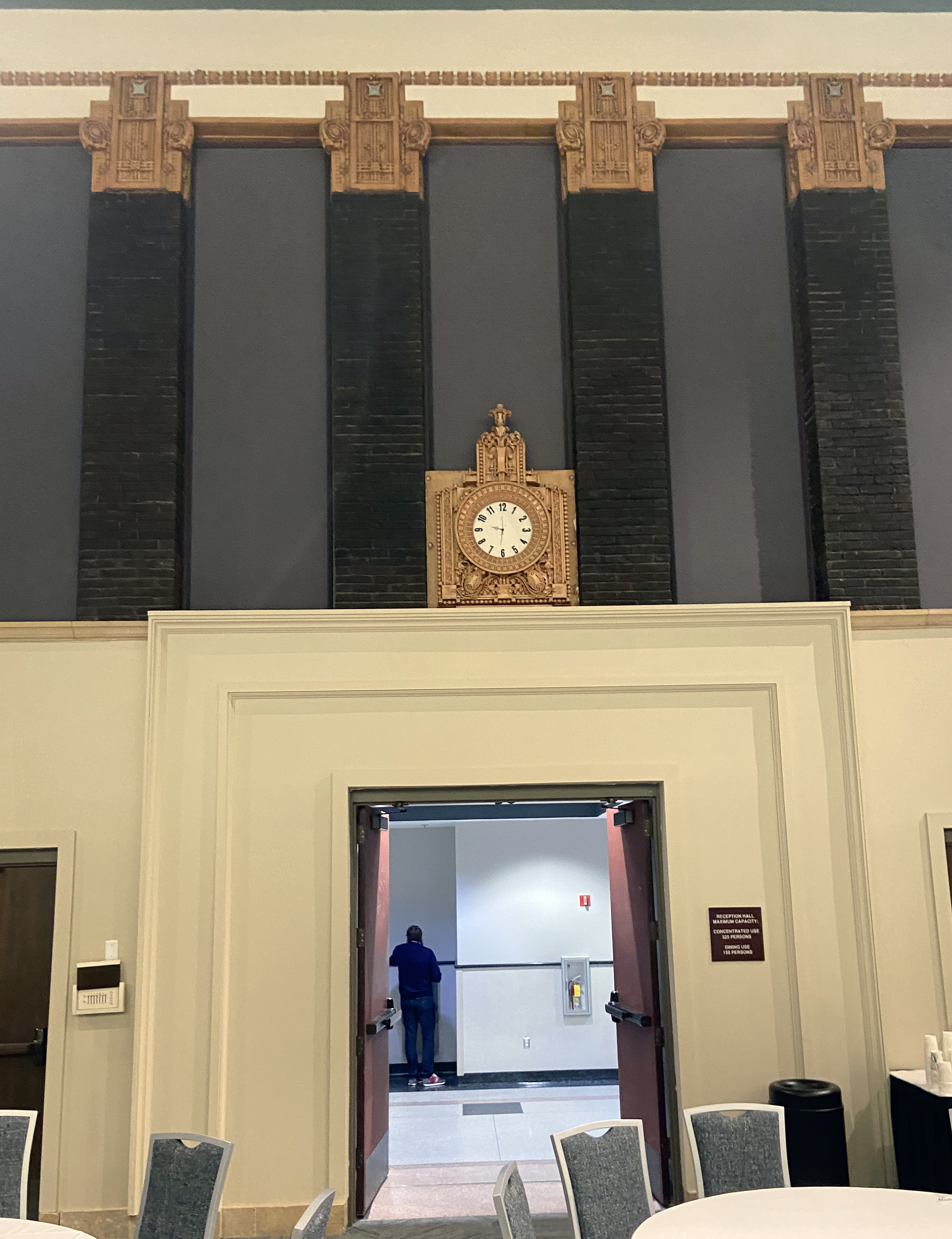
Interior looking to event center

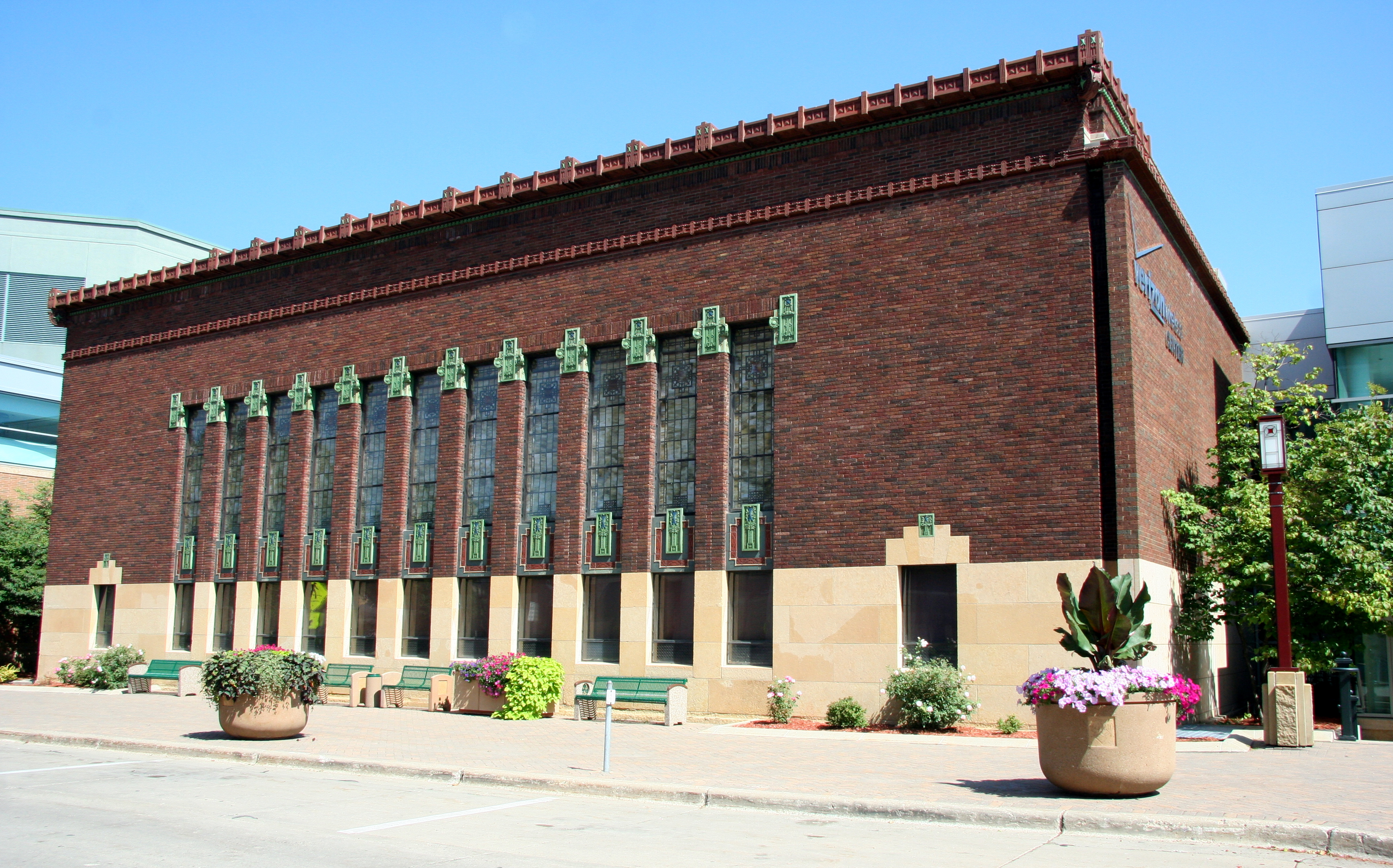
Exterior, side and rear of building

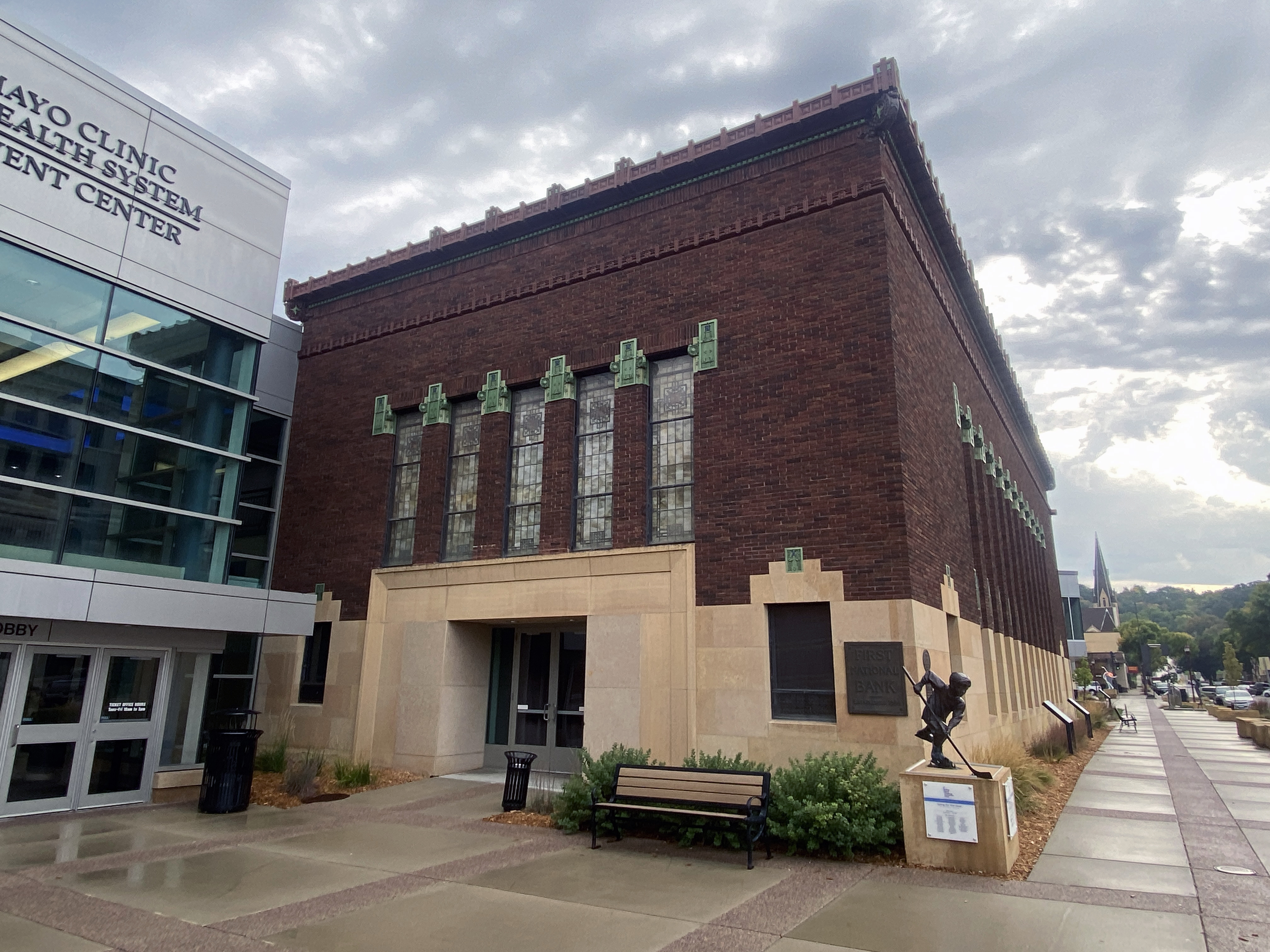
Exterior attached to event center

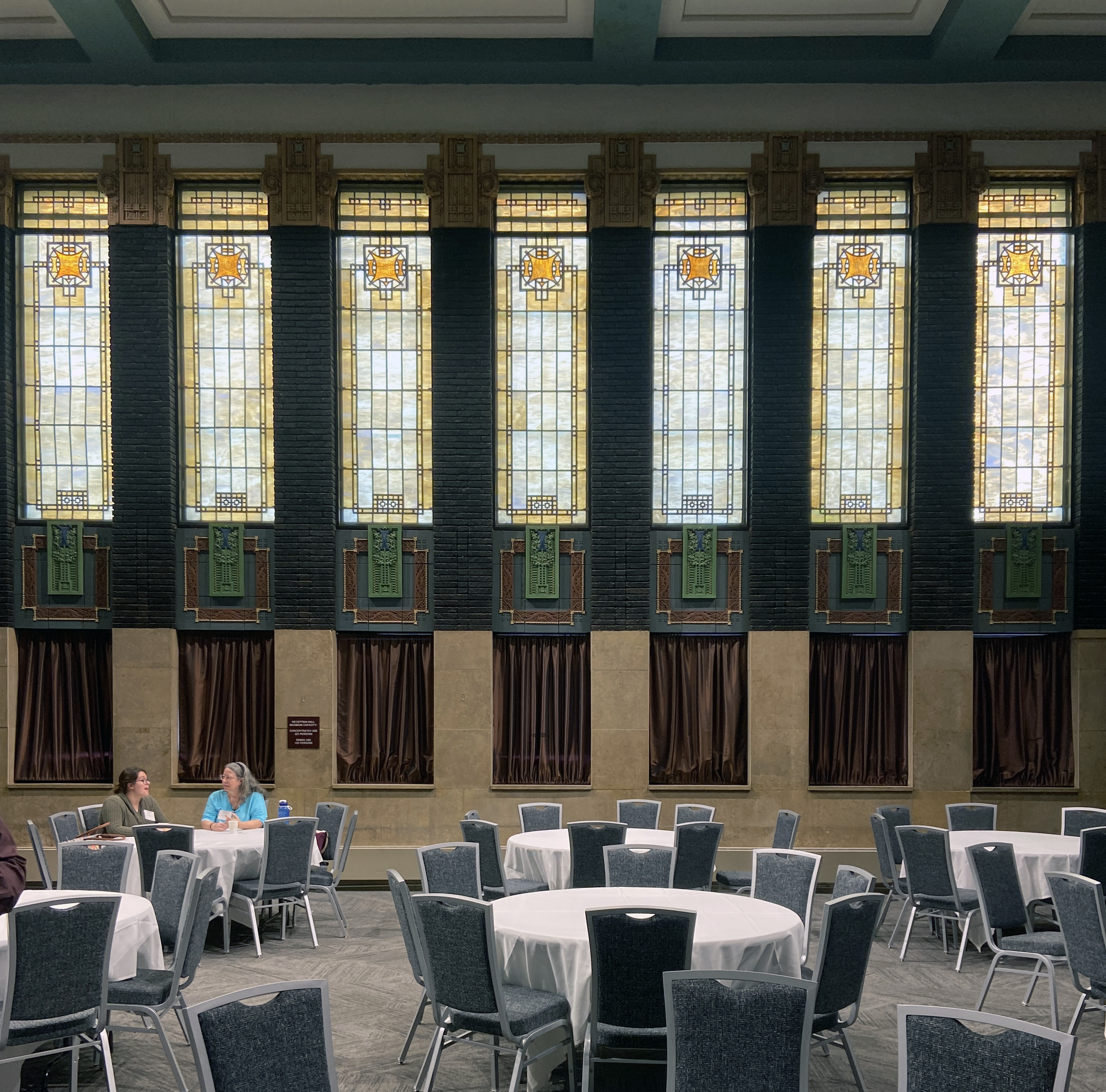
Interior showing windows

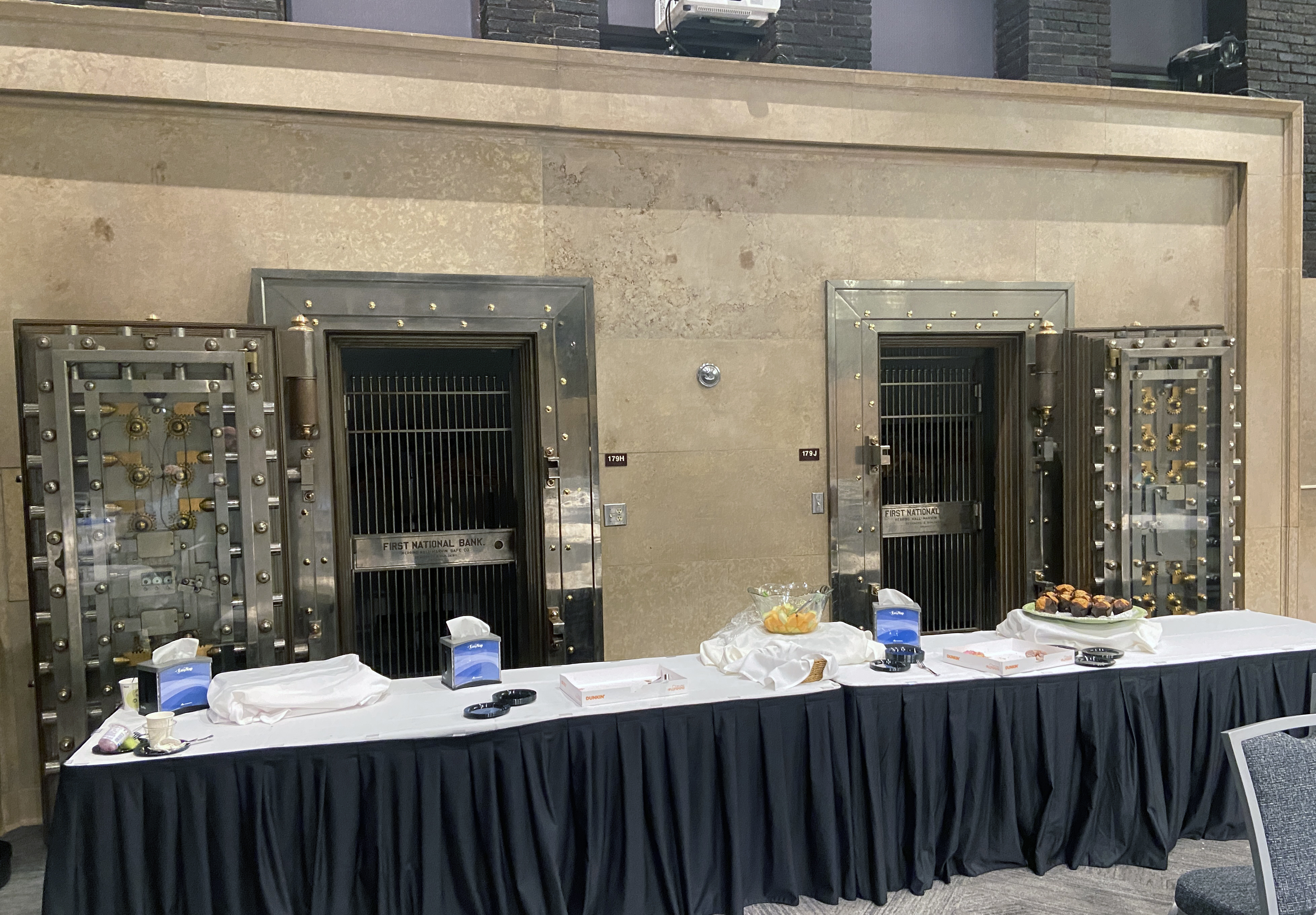
Bank vaults behind banquet table
