= Dylan Collins =

Irish software company founder

Dylan Collins (born 1980) is an Irish software company founder and technology investor.

Collins was a co-founder in 2003 of the gaming software start-up Demonware, which was sold to Activision in 2007. In 2007, Collins went on to acquire Jolt Online Gaming which was sold to GameStop in 2009.

In 2013, Collins founded SuperAwesome, a company that builds infrastructure to enable safe engagement with young audiences on the internet, where he served as the CEO until 2023. The company raised a $7 million investment in June 2015 and in 2017 it was reported by Sky News that the company had raised an additional £20m. The company powers the parental consent requirement for many games oriented at kids such as Pokémon Go. Microsoft's investment arm M12 invested in the company in 2019 and it was acquired in 2020 by Epic Games for just under $500 million.

Parallel to SuperAwesome, Collins was Chairman of Potato, a digital marketing services agency which spun out of Google and was acquired by WPP in 2016.

Collins is regularly quoted in the media around the application of Children's Online Privacy Protection Act (COPPA) to technology companies and the general concern of parental consent required for games and applications that target children. He has recommended media companies have a "Chief Children's Officer" to safeguard the privacy and concerns of children.

Collins is a graduate of Trinity College, Dublin, and he previously sat on the boards of Irish television animation studio Brown Bag Films and the UK agency Potato. He left Epic Games in 2023 and is now an investor through his LFG Holdings vehicle. He is on the board of mobile games publisher Modern Times Group, and Discord sentiment analysis platform Levellr.
