= Slice It! =

2010 video game

- App icon
- Developer(s): Com2uS Studios (iOS, Mac OS X, Android); Arc System Works (3DS)
- Publisher(s): Com2uS Studios (iOS, Mac OS X, Android); 3DS: WW: Arc System Works; EU: Aksys Games
- Platform(s): iOS, Mac OS X, Android, Nintendo 3DS (3DS eShop)
- Release: iOS; August 31, 2010; Android; November 23, 2010; Mac OS X October 11, 2011; 3DS eShop: JP: April 23, 2014; NA: January 14, 2016; EU: February 4, 2016
- Genre(s): Puzzle
- Mode(s): Single-player

Slice It! is a puzzle video game developed and published by Com2uS Studios for iOS and Android in 2010, and for Mac OS X in 2011, and by Arc System Works for Nintendo 3DS' now-discontinued 3DS eShop in Japan in 2014, and internationally in 2016.

== Reception ==
Reception

Aggregate score
Aggregator	Score
Metacritic	(iOS) 83/100 (3DS) 65/100

Review scores
Publication	Score
The A.V. Club	(iOS) A−
Eurogamer	(iOS) 8/10
GamePro	(iOS)
Gamezebo	(iOS)
IGN	(iOS) 8.5/10
Nintendo Life	(3DS)
Pocket Gamer	(AND) (iOS)
TouchArcade	(iOS)

The iOS version received "favorable" reviews, while the 3DS version received "mixed" reviews, according to the review aggregation website Metacritic.
