= Home Run Battle 3D =

2009 video game

- Publisher(s): Com2uS
- Platform(s): Android, iOS
- Release: June 17, 2009
- Genre(s): Arcade, Baseball
- Mode(s): Single-player

Home Run Battle 3D (originally Baseball Slugger: Home Run Race 3D) is an arcade-style, Home Run Derby video game developed by Com2uS for mobile phones. It was inducted into Apple's first App Hall of Fame on October 10, 2010. Home Run Battle 3D is notable for its use of costumes to enhance player attributes, though critics have accused it as a "Pay to Win" game.

== Gameplay ==
Home Run Battle 3D utilizes gyroscope motion controls to aim within the batter's box. Players swing the bat by tapping the screen. Hit distance is based upon striking location, the player's Power attribute, and the Player's Contact attribute. These attributes can be changed by changing a character's equipment. Equipment can be purchased with either the goldball currency earned through gameplay or via in-app purchases.

Home Run Battle 3D features three gameplay modes: Arcade, Classic, and Duel. The first two are single-player modes; the latter is multiplayer only.

In Arcade Mode, players try to hit as many home runs as possible. Points are awarded for each hit, and 100 bonus points are received for hitting a home run. The bonus points increase by 100 points for each consecutive home run. Any at-bat that does not end in a home run resets this bonus score. The player gets an "Out" for any strikes or fouls. When the player reaches ten outs, the game is over.

In Classic Mode, the player only receives 1 point per home run. Outs are received whenever the player does not hit a home run. The game ends when the player reaches ten outs.

In Duel Mode, the player pits his character against other players from around the world in real-time matches. The first person to reach a set number of points, based upon the pitcher difficulty selected, wins. The winning player is rank points for winning as well as a gold ball prize for winning. Players can opt to re-match or face other players.
