= Zenonia 3 =

2011 video game

- Developer: Gamevil
- Publisher: Gamevil
- Series: Zenonia
- Platforms: iOS, Android
- Release: iOS; April 28, 2011; Android; July 1, 2011
- Genre: Action RPG

Zenonia 3: The Midgard Story (Korean: 제노니아 3) is an action role-playing game created, developed, and published by Gamevil for Android and iOS. It was released on the App Store on April 28, 2011, on Google Play on July 1, 2011, and on the Amazon Appstore on April 1, 2012. On the App Store, Zenonia 3 is distributed as a premium and freemium title, whereas on Google Play and the Amazon Appstore, it is distributed as a freemium-only title. It is the sequel to Gamevil's earlier releases Zenonia and Zenonia 2.

== Gameplay ==
Like the earlier games in the Zenonia series, this game features real time combat and exploration. The main character, Chael, is controlled through use of an on-screen d-pad. There are side quests that the player can choose to complete in order to further explore the world. Chael can choose one of four available classes. The Sword Knight and Shadow Hunter are both melee-type characters. The Mechanic Launcher and Nature Shaman use ranged weapons in combat.

=== Execution Room ===
New to the Zenonia series, the Execution Room is a Colosseum-style tournament against in-game monsters. The user can choose to battle the monsters alone or use their device to control their friend's character and face the challenge with a non-player character (NPC) by their side. This is called Asynchronous co-op gameplay. The Execution Room is available to the user after reaching the town of Delfoy.

== Synopsis ==
Chael, the adopted son of the first Zenonia game's protagonist Regret, tries to find his way home after being transported against his will into another dimension, called Midgard, or the middle realm. On his quest, he is accompanied by a girl from the Divine Tribe named Celine and a sarcastic fairy named Runa.

== Reception ==
Reception

Aggregate score
Aggregator	Score
Metacritic	70/100

Review score
Publication	Score
TouchArcade	4/5

Zenonia 3 received praise combined with some criticism. Pocket Gamer awarded it 7 out of 10 points, praising its artwork but criticizing the gameplay as repetitive.
