= Illusia (video game) =

2010 video game

- Developer: Gamevil
- Publisher: Gamevil
- Platforms: iOS, Android
- Release: iOS; December 9, 2010; Android; March 16, 2011
- Genres: Action role-playing game, platformer
- Mode: Single-player

Illusia is an action role-playing platform game created, developed, and published by Gamevil for the iOS and Android. It was released on the App Store on December 10, 2010, on Google Play on March 16, 2011, and on the Amazon Appstore on June 20, 2011. Illusia has been removed from the IOS and Android AppStores.

== Synopsis ==
In the land of Aztaran, a bolt of light crashed down through the skies, and in its wake left a mysterious tower. The entrance to this tower is unknown. Soon, hostile creatures begin to come forth from the tower to wreak havoc on the citizens of Aztaran. In the prologue of the video game, it is prophesied that two adventurers, a mage and a warrior, will be able to enter the tower in order to defeat the creatures and save the land.

== Gameplay ==
The game is controlled using the virtual d-pad as well as the jump and attack buttons. The player navigates the world in a two-dimensional perspective. At the start of the game, the player is asked to choose to play as either a mage or a warrior, two distinct classes of character. Within each class of character are further sub-classes that the player has the option of selecting as the game progresses. Much like other role-playing video games, the character is able to level up by defeating enemies and completing quests. Along with main quests that serve to advance the central story, the player has the option of taking on side-quests by talking to the non-player characters (NPCs) within towns and fields. After completing the game the first time, the player unlocks hell mode, which allows the player to play through the story again facing tougher enemies (the player retains the current level and equipment).

== Reception ==
Reception (iOS edition)

Aggregate score
Aggregator	Score
Metacritic	80/100

Review scores
Publication	Score
148 Apps	3.5/5
AppSafari	3.5/5
AppSpy	4/5
Pocket Gamer	6/10
Slide to Play	4/4

Illusia has been greeted with an overall positive reception from video game critics. On the review aggregate site Metacritic, Illusia has received an 80/100, indicating generally favorable reviews. On the iPhone video game review site AppSpy, Illusia was praised for its expansive campaign and replay value but criticized the unpolished platforming aspects and confusing map system present within the game. Pocket Gamer was more critical of the game, noting that while the presentation is appealing, the game suffers from a poor control scheme and an overall generic nature. On the other hand, Slide to Play gave the game a 4 out of 4 and said that while the game is a bit formulaic, it is still "...another winning RPG from the videogame experts at Gamevil."
