= Level (magazine) =

Czech video game magazine

- September 2002 cover
- Editor-in-chief: Michal Křivský
- Categories: Video game
- First issue: January 24, 1995
- Country: Czech Republic
- Based in: Prague
- Language: Czech language
- ISSN: 1211-6777
- OCLC: 320473611

Level is a computer and video games magazine originating in the Czech Republic with branches in Romania and Turkey. These branches in the three countries occasionally share and exchange content. Level also organizes many yearly gaming competitions for players in two of the countries (Romania's pro-gaming sponsor being the PGL – Professional Gamer's League); it is one of the biggest Turkish sponsors of international gaming contests (such as WCG).

Level was founded by Jan "Beast" Tománek in 1995 in Czech Republic. Its first issue was released on 24.01.1995. The current Level editor-in-chief is Michal Křivský (replacing Petr Poláček).

== Level in Czech Republic ==
Level was the third magazine, after Excalibur in 1991 and Score in 1994, about computer games, released on the Czech market. With the founder Martin Ludvík, Level began its history in January, 1995. For a year and a half, the editor-in-chief was Jan Tománek, followed by Petr Bulíř (half a year in charge) and Jan Herodes, who led the magazine for seven years. His former assistant Ondřej Průša, one of the few people who had been with Level for its whole history, replaced him during the following 4 years. The current editor-in-chief is Martin Bach. Level is considered the best selling magazine about computer games in the Czech Republic with nearly 40.000 print-outs dispatched every month. Current editorial staff consists of more than twenty members.

Level is/was structured into following sections and page donations:
Editorial – word from chief editor
Content table
Letters – letter from fans with answers from editors
Review of Month – pages
Reactor – about 13 papes of blogs/commentaries from editors/game developers and interesting themes
News – 12 pages
Previews – 4 pages
Theme – 4 pages
Pixelvision / page 42 – section with art from games developers, 2 pages
Reviews – 19 pages
Hardware – news, tests, performance comparisons, interesting HW, 14 pages
Consoles – news, reviews, 4 pages
Retro – news, happened before x years, making of..., geography, irreversible destiny, 10 pages
Developers introduction – 4 pages
Mod scene – 2 pages
Advertisements through whole magazine – 17 pages

From March 1998 every issue of magazine is accompanied by at least one AA/AAA fullgame on cover CD/DVD. CD/DVD usually contains: Full game(s), demo(s), free games, film/game trailers, utilities & drivers, Level TV videosection with videoreviews and funstuff. From issue 12/2011 all video content was transferred to magazines´ game portal hrej.cz and is accessible with code printed in magazine along with fullgame keys. The content is usually carried on one or two one-sided DVD9 media.

== Level in Turkey ==
The Turkish edition was founded and initially written by M. Berker Güngör (alias "Maddog") in 1997 and then Sinan Akkol (alias "Blaxis") joined the family couple of years later when he attended to a contest and became the heart of Level; today it is the leading computer games magazine in Turkey, with over 25 authors and distribution of 20,000 per issue. While the global games magazine PC Gamer and the local Gameshow (magazine) at first competed in the Turkish market, their Turkish branches closed due to financial difficulty, leaving Level without competitors—and with extra staff poached from the failed publications.

The magazine encourages the purchase of legal copies of games, having published a series of articles about software piracy.

During August 2007, The magazine was sold to Doğan Burda, the leading magazine publisher of Turkey. Fırat Akyıldız (the editor-in-chief for Official PlayStation 2 Magazine Turkey and GamePro magazines in the past) became the editor-in-chief. Famous comedy duo Cenk and Erdem, Cem Şancı and writer Ali Aksöz (the creator of a highly successful web organization named Lost Library) has returned to Level after the split. Also many writers from GamePro has joined Level.

== Level in Romania ==
In September 1997 Vogel Publishing Romania launches the first Romanian gaming magazine called "Level INTERNATIONAL GAMES MAGAZINE". At its peak, it was the leading computer games magazine in Romania with 21.000 magazines per issue and 79.000 readers per issue. Level Romania saw its ups and downs in its over a decade of activity.

The magazine includes a DVD since 2006, it was the second Romanian magazine to include a DVD, after XtremPC. The magazine also features a full game every issue since 2002, a very controversial decision back in the day because of the games' quality, which varied from issue to issue.

The longest lasting author of Level Romania is Marius Ghinea, who joined the team back in 1998 and raised the standards by writing high quality reviews, correlating gaming to forms of art and by having a very "refined taste" in games. Other authors that deserve to be mentioned for outstanding activity over the years: Mr. President, Claudiu 'Claude' Gedo, Wild Snake, Sebah, Mihail 'Mike' Stegaru, Mihai 'Mitza' Sfrijan, Sebastian 'Locke' Bularca, Vladimir 'Ciolan' Ciolan and Mircea 'KiMO' Dumitriu, current Editor in Chief. Level Romania was in direct competition with PcGames4Fun, which got closed, and used to be in competition with GameOver (which featured only 16 issues), the latter being considered by many to be the best gaming magazine ever written in Romania so far.

In 2007 Level Romania organized an event called "Level-fest" aka "Viva la Level-ution", which would mark a successful re-tooling of their magazine. The event was held in Bucharest, in a club called "Fire".

In 2008 Level Romania held the contest "Tu faci jocurile" (You make the games) in which they awarded a team of programmers 5,000 Euros for creating an original and entertaining video game (you could only enter the contest if you were an independent team, not part of a company).

Starting with 2009, Level has sometimes given two full games with certain issues and is also heavily promoting interesting Indie Games.

As of December 2013, Level no longer exists on the Romanian market. The old team made a new, online magazine called "NIVELUL2". In English, "NIVELUL2" means "2nd LEVEL", and the new magazine is known to be the spiritual successor to the former leading gaming magazine in the territory. Currently, NIVELUL2 is the leading online gaming publication in Romania.
