= XtremPC =

Computer magazine from Romania

- Issue 56 cover
- Publisher: Romas Comercial srl
- First issue: 1998
- Final issue Number: May 2010; 120
- Country: Romania
- Language: Romanian
- Website: www.xtrempc.ro (defunct)
- ISSN: 1582-2818

XtremPC was a computer magazine from Romania founded in 1998. XtremPC included previews and reviews on computer hardware, software, PC games and gadgets, as well as IT news. Although its major focus was on personal computers only, latter editions started including sections dedicated to game consoles as well. XtremPC was the first Romanian magazine to include a DVD in 2004, followed two years later by LeveL. The last issue of XtremPC was the May 2010 issue (No. 120), which appeared on 3 June 2010. The further issuing of the magazine temporarily ended as a result of a drop in the number of readers.

== Format ==
XtremPC included four main sections:

- IT Express – news and articles regarding the latest innovations in the IT world;
- Hardware – news, previews, reviews, tests and comparison charts of computer hardware;
- Software & Communication – news, reviews and tests on computer software and communication and multimedia devices;
- Jocuri (Games) – news and reviews on PC games; later included console games as well.

== Editions ==
The latter issues of the magazine were available in three editions based on the type of digital media that they included:

- XtremPC (key-coloured in green) – included the magazine only, priced at 5.9 lei (approx. US$2)
- XtremPC CD (key-coloured in orange) – included the magazine as well as a Compact Disc, priced at 7.9 lei (approx. US$2.6)
- XtremPC DVD (key-coloured in blue) – included the magazine as well as a DVD, priced at 12.9 lei (approx. US$4.2)

Currently, all three editions of XtremPC are out of print. The website has been shut down, but the forum is still active. There is a fan site that holds the PDF versions of the magazine.
