= Super Action Hero =

2007 video game

- Cover for the game
- Developer: Com2uS
- Publisher: Com2uS
- Series: Action Hero
- Platform: Mobile phone
- Release: December 31, 2007
- Genre: Fighting/Platform

Super Action Hero (Korean: 슈퍼 액션 히어로) is a 2007 platformer fighting game developed and published by the South Korean company Com2uS. In Brazil, it was distributed by Tectoy's mobile division.

To proceed throughout the game, the player must complete missions instead of following a story.

== Gameplay ==
The game has a visual considered unusual, the characters are stick figure-like with animations and effects similar to drawings in notebooks.

The game also has a so-called "hero bar", which will be reduced every second and when it ends, the mission also ends. It can be reduced more quickly when the player gets hurt, but in some missions there are items (such as stars) or conditions to be met to restore the bar.

After fulfilling certain requirements, players will unlock a mask. There are 32 masks in all, each one with appearances and status different from each other.

Some raise the hero bar, increase strength, and have a median agility and low defense, for example.

You can also increase or decrease the speed of the game according to the player's will.

== Reception ==
Reception

Review score
Publication	Score
IGN	7.5

Award
Publication	Award
AT&T	Most Visually Innovative game of 2007

The game was received in a very positive way, being praised for its visuals as simple, but striking, and that the commands are considered easy to learn.

However, it was criticized slow command response in some other cell types (such as N73).

== Sequels ==
Super Action Hero Returns was released on 1 December 2020.
