= Zenonia 2 =

2010 video game

- Developer: Gamevil
- Publisher: Gamevil
- Series: Zenonia
- Platforms: iOS, Android
- Release: iOS; March 29, 2010; Android; December 24, 2010
- Genre: Action role-playing game
- Modes: Single-player, multiplayer

Zenonia 2: The Lost Memories is the sequel to Zenonia, an action role-playing game developed, created, and published by Gamevil for the iOS and Android. It was released on the App Store on March 29, 2010, on the Android Market on December 24, 2010, and on the Amazon Appstore in the first quarter of 2011.

== Gameplay ==
Zenonia 2 features real time combat and exploration. The player has four characters to choose from: Daza, Ecne, Morpice, and Lu. Daza is a melee-class warrior with high strength and speed but low defense. Ecne is a ranged-class shooter with high evasion and attack power but low defense. Morpice is a ranged-class magician who relies on his pool of SP (skill points) for his magic attacks. Lu is a melee-class paladin with high defense and healing spells but low attack power. All characters are controlled by using the virtual d-pad, which is located in the lower left corner of the screen. It can be adjusted along with the action button located on the lower right of the screen. Zenonia 2 adheres to the formula for action role-playing games, with questing, skill trees, leveling up, and battles. It also has a PvP (Player verses Player) system, in which users can test their characters against other user's characters.

== Plot ==
The prologue of the game states that four heroes were tasked with guarding the seal of the evil dragon Ladon after the events of the first game, as Regret is nowhere to be found. However, humans slowly become corrupted, so the gods of Zenonia have no choice but to wipe the memories of everyone in the land to restore peace using the "Tree of Life". Now, the residents of Deva Castle search for a way to restore their lost memories, as well as keep Ladon imprisoned, by finding the four gems. Each of the four selectable characters has a prologue specific to them that sets up the events of the game, in which the four characters are inevitably imprisoned in the dungeon of Deva Castle. After escaping, the characters are given an ultimatum: work for Zavkiel to retrieve the four gems and, as a result, have their wishes granted, or be re-imprisoned. After choosing the former, the adventure begins.

Each of the characters have their own back-story and motivations. Daza, the warrior, is the last remaining member of the Minotaur tribe; Ecne, the gunslinger, is on a mission to find her older brother; Morpice, the magician, was taken in, and subsequently trained, by the magician Zealous after being orphaned; and Lu, the paladin, wants to save his grandfather.

== Development and release ==
Com2us announced on 22 September 2026 that it would release a remaster of Zenonia 2 for Windows via Steam.

== Reception ==
Reception

Aggregate score
Aggregator	Score
Metacritic	84/100

Review scores
Publication	Score
IGN	8.0/10
148Apps	4/5
Pocket Gamer	7/10
Slide to Play	4/4

Zenonia 2 had positive reception. It received a 7/10 from Pocket Gamer, earning a bronze award, but with criticism directed toward the lack of substantial changes from the first game. Slide to Play gave it a 4/4, labeling it a "Must Have" title and saying that, "The iPhone’s first game-changing RPG is back and yet again setting the bar higher." 148Apps gave the game 4 out of 5 stars, saying that while Zenonia 2 was no longer the best RPG of its time on the App Store like its predecessor, it was still "...an excellent, traditional romp through an old-school world."
