= Midwest Wireless =

- Company type: Defunct
- Industry: Cellular Communications
- Founded: 1995
- Successor: Verizon Wireless
- Headquarters: Mankato, Minnesota, United States
- Products: Cellular Telephone Service
- Website: midwestwireless.com

Midwest Wireless was a wireless telephone company serving southern Minnesota, northern Iowa and western Wisconsin in the United States. The company served roughly 400,000 customers and used CDMA phone technology.

The company's slogan was "We answer to you." The headquarters were in Mankato, Minnesota. The coverage region of Midwest Wireless excluded the Twin Cities metropolitan area. Midwest Wireless provided 2G and 3G service using CDMA 2000 and EV-DO technologies. Midwest Wireless was also one of the largest wireless Internet service providers in the United States.

Midwest Wireless was purchased by Alltel in late 2005 ; the purchase was cleared of antitrust concerns on September 7, 2006 and was completed on October 3, 2006 . Through 2007, Alltel still did business as Midwest Wireless in markets formerly served by Midwest Wireless as they transitioned all customers to Alltel, a process which was completed by the end of 2007.

Midwest Wireless was the naming sponsor of the Midwest Wireless Civic Center in Mankato from 1996 to 2007.
