= Mayo Clinic Health System Event Center =

Multi-purpose arena in Mankato, Minnesota

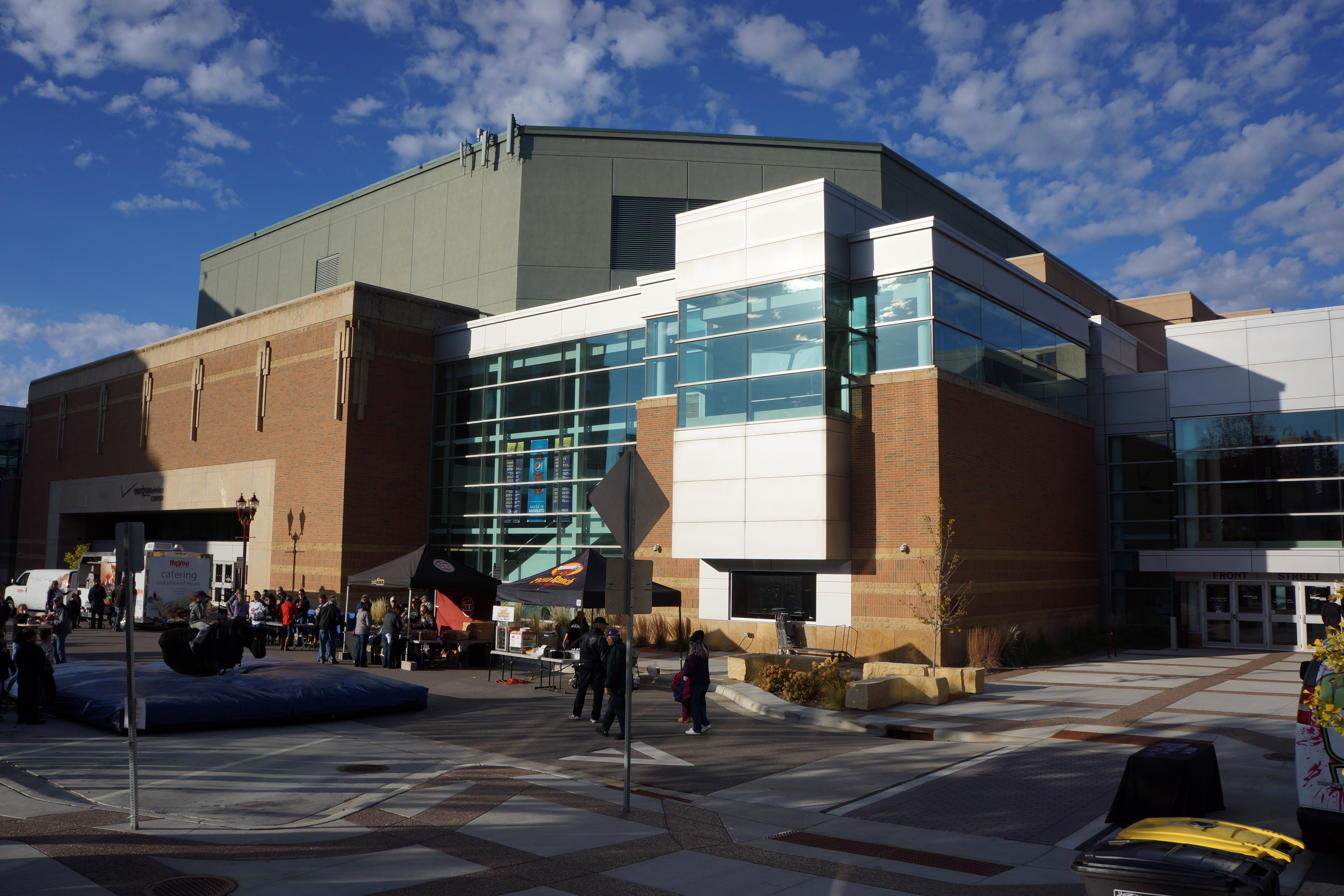

- Location in Minnesota Location in the United States
- Former names: Mankato Civic Center (1995–1999, 2019); Midwest Wireless Civic Center (1999–2007); Alltel Center (2007–2009); Verizon Wireless Center (2009–2017); Verizon Center (2017–2019)
- Location: 1 Civic Center Plaza; Mankato, Minnesota 56001
- Coordinates: 44°09′58″N 94°00′17″W
- Owner: City of Mankato
- Operator: City of Mankato
- Capacity: 5,280 (ice hockey); 8,200 (concerts)
- Surface: 200' x 88'4” (hockey)

Construction
- Opened: February 3, 1995

Tenants
- Minnesota State Mavericks (NCAA) (1995–present); Minnesota Purple Rage (IFL) (2000)

The Mayo Clinic Health System Event Center is a 5,280-seat (8,200 for concerts) multi-purpose arena in Mankato, Minnesota, built in 1994 and opened in early 1995. It is home to the Minnesota State Mavericks men's ice hockey team and women's ice hockey team, and also hosts musical performances, conventions and other events. Prior to its construction, the team played their home games at All Seasons Arena.

Until April 1, 2019, the arena's naming sponsor was Verizon Communications, one of America's major telecommunications companies.

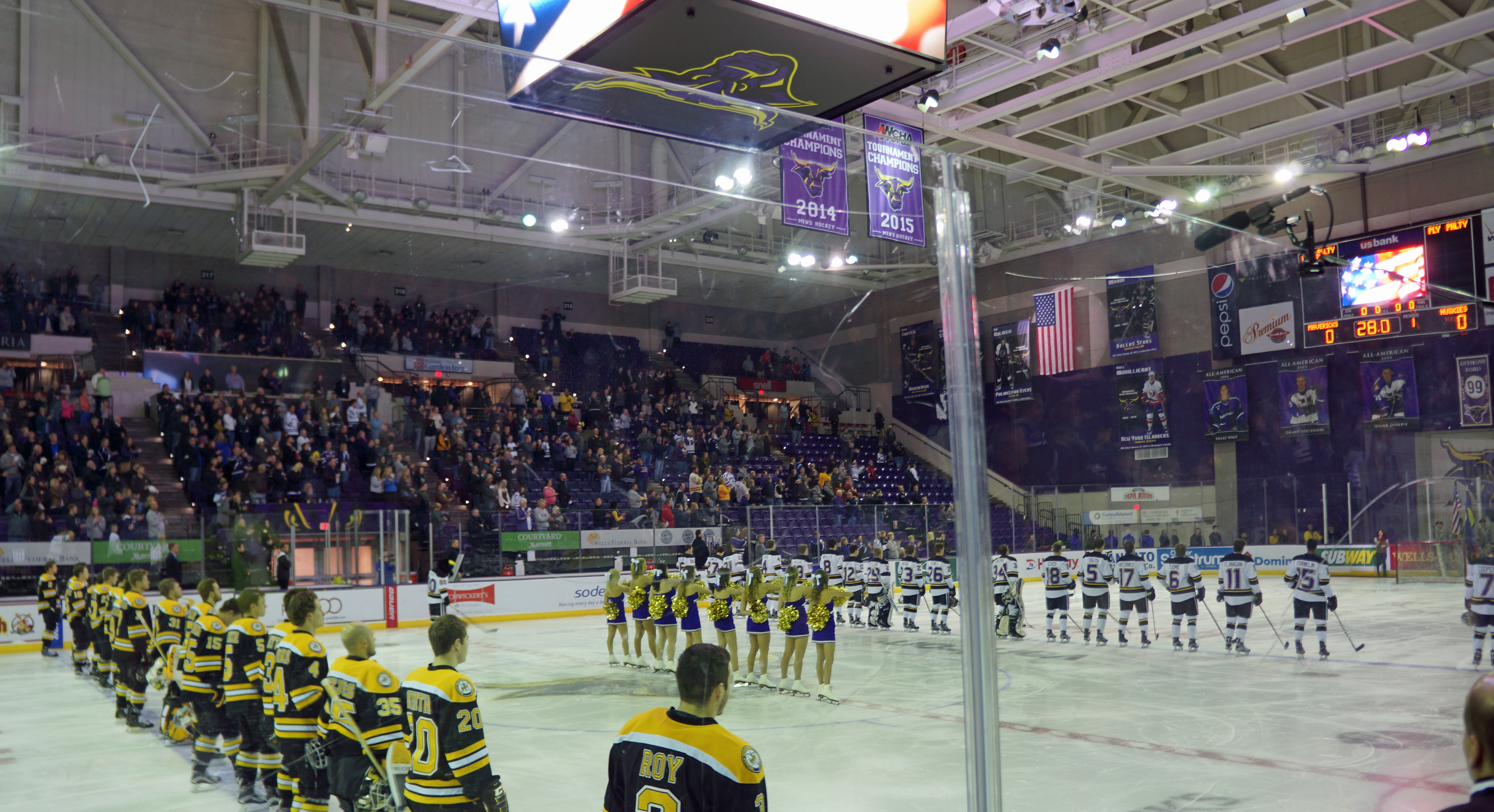
Inside the Verizon Center Ice Arena before an NCAA Division 1 Hockey Game between the Minnesota State Mavericks and the Michigan Tech Huskies men's teams

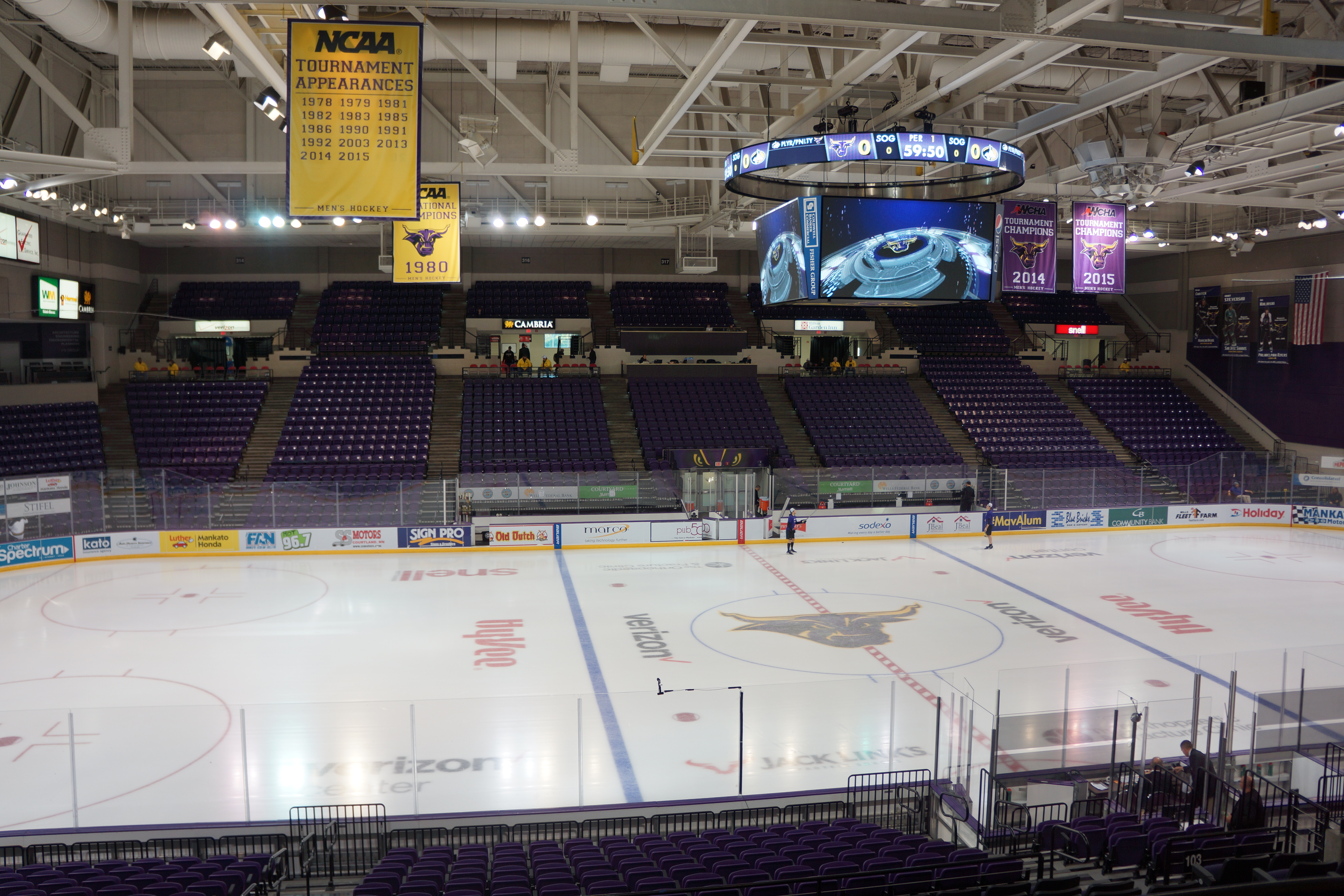
The Verizon Center inside before a hockey game event

== History ==
In the 1992 general election, Mankato voters approved a 0.5% tax increment to support downtown renovations, including construction of a new sports arena. Construction began in 1994, and the facility opened as the Mankato Civic Center in 1995 with a men's hockey event on February 3. The south side of the complex incorporates the restored exterior of the First National Bank of Mankato, a 1913 Prairie School building.

In 1999, locally headquartered phone company Midwest Wireless purchased the naming rights, changing the venue's name to the Midwest Wireless Civic Center.

In July 2007, the facility's name changed to the Alltel Center following Alltel's acquisition of Midwest Wireless. Alltel paid $110,000 per year for naming rights.

In 2009, the name changed again, this time to the Verizon Wireless Center, after Alltel was acquired by Verizon Wireless.

In 2015, an expansion of the facility began with the purchase and demolition of the adjacent US Bank building. Construction was completed the following year, and the additional space with room for up to 2,000 more people opened on September 1, 2016. The name of the new facility was originally intended to be the Event Center, but prior to opening the City of Mankato decided to call it the Performing Arts Center instead to better reflect the anticipated usage primarily for musical and theatrical events.

In 2017, Verizon dropped "Wireless" from the name and the facility became simply the Verizon Center. The Performing Arts Center was also renamed the Grand Hall later in the year.

In March 2019, it was announced that Verizon would not be renewing its naming rights agreement. On April 1, 2019, the facility's name reverted to Mankato Civic Center, and remained so through the end of the year.

On December 30, 2019, the City of Mankato announced a new naming rights agreement with Mayo Clinic Health Systems effective January 1, 2020.

== Events ==
Primarily, the center hosts hockey games, concerts and conventions.

Notable past artists and events include Aerosmith, Anthrax, Avenged Sevenfold, Blue Öyster Cult, Bob Dylan, Boston, Breaking Benjamin, Cheap Trick, Chicago, Cinderella, Coolio, Crosby, Stills & Nash, Daughtry, Def Leppard, Disney Live, Disturbed, Dokken, Elton John, Falling in Reverse, Five Finger Death Punch, Foreigner, Heart, James Taylor, Jeff Dunham, Joan Jett and the Blackhearts, John Fogerty, John Mellencamp, Journey, Judas Priest, Kansas, Kenny Rogers, KISS, Korn, Lita Ford, Loverboy, Lynyrd Skynyrd, Marilyn Manson, Monster Jam, Mötley Crüe, Night Ranger, Papa Roach, Poison, Queensrÿche, Rascal Flatts, REO Speedwagon, Rob Zombie, Salt-N-Pepa, Sheryl Crow, Skid Row, Slipknot, Soul Asylum, Styx, Ted Nugent, Tesla, The Beach Boys, The Marshall Tucker Band, The Monkees, Tom Petty and the Heartbreakers, Weird Al Yankovic, WWE Live, and ZZ Top.
