= Com2uS =

South Korean mobile and online gaming company

- Traded as: KRX: 078340
- Industry: Video games
- Founded: 1998; 28 years ago
- Founders: Jiyoung Park; Youngil Lee; Yu Jin Hyeon
- Headquarters: Seoul, South Korea
- Parent: Com2uS Holdings
- Website: Official website

Com2uS (Korean: 컴투스) is a South Korean mobile and online game development/publishing company established in 1998. Com2uS develops games for Android, iOS, and other platforms. The company's corporate offices are located in the United States, Korea, Japan, and China.

In 2007 Com2uS was listed on KOSDAQ. On October 4, 2013, Gamevil acquired a majority stake in Com2uS for a little over $65 million.

Com2us launched Summoners War in 2014 and subsequently went on to earn more than 1.3 trillion won in revenue from the game in a period of over three years.

== History ==
Com2uS Corporation was founded in 1998 by Korea University students Jiyoung Park, Youngil Lee, and Yu Jin (Gin) Hyeon, who developed games for mobile devices.

On September 10, 2008, the mobile game division of Disney (Disney Interactive) made a deal with Com2uS in which the latter would develop games for the former to publish and distribute in the United States. Disney Puzzle Family was the first game developed under the agreement, which was released later that month. The next title with Disney Interactive, Disney Game Parade, was released the following year.

In 2008, Com2uS registered a trademark for the term "Tower Defense". Many developers who make tower defense games have changed their games because of this, including Ninja Kiwi's games in the Bloons Tower Defense series. During early 2010, some developers in Apple's App Store affected by this change had reported receiving messages asking them to change names of games, citing trademark violation.

On October 4, 2013, Gamevil acquired 21.37% of Com2us for $65 million.

In January 2020, Com2uS teamed up with Skybound Entertainment, a U.S. entertainment company, to create a mobile game based on The Walking Dead series.

On October 18, 2021, Com2uS announced that it had invested a total of 350 billion won ($295 million) in media and gaming companies that year. Investments included acquiring 13.7% of Wysiwyg Studios in March, and an additional investment in August bringing its total stake in the company to 38.11%. Earlier in the year, In February 2021, Com2uS became the second-largest shareholder in Devsisters with a total 14.88% stake. Com2uS also acquired 2.1% stake in K bank, as well as investments into Allm, Grampus, Jungle Studios, Whynot Media, and Mediacan.

On November 30, 2021, Gamevil changed its corporate name to ‘Com2uS Holdings’ after 21 years in order to strengthen its holding role and increase cooperation with other affiliates in hopes of increasing its reach at a time of rapid global expansion.

On March 28, 2022, Com2uS announced the acquisition of My Music Taste controlling a 58.5% stake in the company.

The company launched its metaverse platform Com2Verse in July 2023, but began downsizing two months later after operating at a net loss. In August, Com2uS partnered with Firefly Games, The Sandbox, and Formless Capital to form MetaWorld Entertainment, a new venture that would focus on Web3 experiences. On November 1, 2022, Com2uS acquired a 4.2% stake in SM Entertainment.

In January 2023, and subsequent 2024 Com2uS began looking for employees to voluntarily resign, following an extended period of operating at a loss, as it looked to cut "a two-digit number of people."

Com2uS said October 28, 2024 it will begin service of its subculture title, "Starseed: Asnia Trigger," in North America and two other English-speaking nations later this week.

== Summoners War ==
The Summoners War series is the largest franchise of the company. Sky Arena the first in the series is a turn based RPG. The Lost Centuria is an earlier example of the now popular gacha game subgenre, with added elements of its previous series. Chronicles is its most recent installment and allows open world exploration as a MMORPG. Aside from the games the Summoners War series also has a light novel, titled Summoners War: Summoner Combat and a comic Summoners War: Legacy.

== Awards ==
Game Awards
Games	Awards	Year
Summoners War: Chronicles	won the Grand Prize at the 2022 Korea Game Award	2022
Summoners War	Wins OGN G-Rank Global Special Award	2016
Summoners Wars	Winner of Korea Game Awards Excellence Prize & Technology Award	2014
Slice It	Winner of 2010 Korea Game Grand Prize	2010
Super Action Hero 2	Winner of the Korea Game Awards Excellence Prize / Game Character Award	2008
Super Action Hero	Winner of the 'Best Game Design Award' in China's 3rd Excellent Mobile Game Award	2008
Mini Game Paradise 3	Winner of Korea Game Grand Prix	2007
Mini Game Paradise	Awarded Minister of Culture and Tourism Prize for Korea Cultural Contents Export Award in	2003

=== Other Awards ===
1. Com2uS, Wins the 16th Korean Consumption Culture Awards
2. Com2uS, Selected as the Top 5 Global Developers by UK Pocket Gamer
3. Com2uS, Winner of the US 2015 DARI Award 'Korea Enterprise of the Year'
4. Com2uS Hub, Winner of the 7th Korea Internet Grand Prize Presidential Award
5. Com2uS, Wins the Presidential Commendation for the 9th Gender Equality Employment Equity Award
6. Com2uS Wins the 4th Prime Minister's Software Industry Development Award

== Studios ==
List of studios
Name	Location	Acquired	Ref(s).
Day7	Seoul, South Korea	2019	
Nova Factory	Seoul, South Korea	2019	
Mana Core	Seoul, South Korea	2019	
Com2uS Tygem (formerly Dongyang Online)	Seoul, South Korea	2020	
Tikitaka Studio	Seoul, South Korea	2020	
Out of the Park Developments	Berlin, Germany	2020	
allm	Seoul, South Korea	2021	
FunFlow	Seoul, South Korea	2021	

== Games ==
=== Summoners War ===
- Summoners War: Rush
- Summoners War: Lost Centuria
- Summoners War: Sky Arena
- Summoners War: Chronicles

=== The Walking Dead ===
- The Walking Dead: All-Stars: A mobile idle survival role-playing video game available both on Android and iOS. It was released globally on August 31, 2022. It features a vast array of characters and skills, as well as idle battle and collection systems. In this game, players must strategically recruit survivors and collect resources through a variety of story-driven modes and in-game events to build and evolve their own sanctuary while fighting against zombies to survive.

=== Other ===
- 9 Innings: Pro Baseball
- Ace Fishing: Paradise Blue
- Caligo Chaser
- Chocolate Tycoon
- Chronicles of Inotia 2: Wanderer of Luone
- Chronicles of Inotia 3: Children of Carnia
- Chronicles of Inotia 4: Assassin of Berkel
- Chronicles of Inotia: Legend of Feanor
- Crazy Hotdogs
- Dead City
- Dragon Sky
- East Legend
- Escape the Ape
- Gold Jumper
- Golfstar
- GrandPar Golf
- Heavy Gunner 3D
- Heir of Light: Eclipse
- Home Run Battle 2
- Home Run Battle 3D
- IMO: The World Of Magic
- Inotia
- Magic Tree by Com2uS (Social Network Game on iOS and Android)
- Mini Game Paradise
- Mini Game Planet
- MLB9Innings26
- Piggy Adventure
- Puzzle Family
- Queen's Crown
- Slice It!
- Sniper Vs Sniper: Online
- Starseed: Asnia Trigger
- SummitX Snowboarding
- Super Action Hero
- Third Blade
- Tiny Farm by Com2uS (Award at Korean Game Conference 2012, 13 million players in 2013)
- Tower Defense: Lost Earth
- Witch Wars
- World of Tunes
- Zombie Runaway

==== Discontinued ====
- Arel Wars
- Arel Wars 2
- Kung Fu Pets
- Skylanders Ring of Heroes!
- Soccer Spirits
- Soul Seeker
- Zenonia 1,2 & 3
