= KDice =

2006 video game

- Developer: Ryan Dewsbury
- Publisher: aplayr
- Engine: Flash, AJAX
- Platform: Browser
- Release: 1 December 2006
- Genre: Turn-based Strategy
- Mode: Multiplayer

KDice is a browser-based multiplayer strategy game based on Taro Ito's Dice Wars. KDice is programmed in Adobe Flash and AJAX by Ryan Dewsbury and was released in 2006. Gameplay in KDice is a simplified version of Risk with the primary goal of the game being to control every territory on the map.

== Gameplay ==
A teal-colored 5 dice on a territory (actual-size)

KDice is a turn-based game for seven players. It is played on a number of predefined 2D (flat) maps containing 22 to 43 territories. The goal of the game is to control every territory on the map or to be the last player that has not surrendered or been eliminated from the gameplay. At the start of a game, territories are randomly divided among the players, and a random number of dice (representing armies) are stacked on each territory. A player is then randomly selected to go first. Players take turns to attack and hold neighboring territories. In order to alleviate concerns that starting last (7th) in the first round is a disadvantage, the 6th and 7th players to play receive a one die bonus. Both players receive an extra die in their dice distributions, increasing the probability that their territories will survive attacks for the first round of play.

To attack, a territory containing more than one die is selected, and a target, which must be an adjacent territory held by an opponent, is then selected. The game then rolls a number of dice equal to the sizes of the dice stacks on the two territories and compares the totals. If the attacking player has a higher total, he takes control of the territory under attack; all but one of the dice from the attacking territory are then moved to the defeated territory. Otherwise (if the attacker's total is equal to or less than the defender's), the attacker does not gain control, and the number of dice in his stack is reduced to one. Players can attack multiple times per turn, limited only by the number of dice they have remaining. At the end of the turn, the player receives a number of dice equal to the largest number of contiguous territories he controls. These are added randomly throughout the player's territories. Usually, the maximum number of dice allowed on each territory is eight. However, some maps have a maximum number of four or sixteen dice. Surplus dice are stored if all territories have a maximum number of dice, with up to 4x the maximum; the game uses these to restack dice within the player's territories where possible. In contrast to Risk and similar games, dice may not be moved between territories, so forethought and strategic play are required when deciding where to attack.

== Ranking system ==
As of February 11, 2007, a new scoring system was put into place which also ranks users based on dominance throughout the game in addition to the rank position a player finished the game. Dominance is based on the average territory count the player had, recorded at the beginning of their turn, compared to the total number of turns elapsed. In order to eliminate favoritism to players who can spread themselves out early in the game due to large dice stack placements, dominance calculations come into play after the third round of a game has completed.

In August 2007, a new system was put into testing that threw out the algorithm for ELO and ranked players using points accumulated starting from 0. From September 1, 2007 to January 1, 2008, varying implementations of this new system were used where players contributed points to a "pot" every turn and redistributed them according to number of territories held. This led to the birth of a strategy called "point-farming", an unpopular practice where the player in first place would drag the game out as long as possible to keep farming points out of the other players who were jockeying for place amongst each other. The update pushed out on January 2, 2008 was designed to do away with this practice—in a race that has basically been decided the player in first place will not be awarded extra points for extending the length of the game.

Scores are reset to 0 at the beginning of each month. Top players of the month win trophies that are stored in their bio boxes, and game rooms are named after their usernames.

== Reception and impact ==
KDice has been praised by GamaSutra for being one of the twenty most addictive browser-based games. The game has also prompted interest for its donation-based business model, where players earn stars for each five dollars they contribute. The game has been nominated for a 2007 Crunchie award and has won the Jay Is Games 2006 Best Multiplayer award.
