= Summoners War: Sky Arena =

2014 strategy video game developed by Com2us

- App Store icon
- Developer: Com2uS
- Publisher: Com2uS
- Platforms: Android, iOS, Windows
- Release: Mobile: June 12, 2014, Windows: January 8, 2024
- Genres: Turn-based Strategy, MMO

Summoners War: Sky Arena is a mobile turn-based strategy massively multiplayer online game created by South Korean game developer, Com2uS. The game was announced and released at the Electronic Entertainment Expo on June 12, 2014 for iOS and Android devices. Summoners War has performed successfully, with 200,000,000 downloads worldwide, in earnings. In 2020, the game had a crossover with the Street Fighter series, adding characters Ryu, Chun-Li, Ken Masters, M. Bison, and Dhalsim as monsters to the game.

== Gameplay ==
Players assume the role of a summoner, opening scrolls in order to acquire monsters to fight in turn-based battles.

The game has 20 episodes. Each Episode contains 7 stages.

=== Monsters ===
Newly summoned monsters range from a 1-star grade to a 5-star grade, with 4- and 5-star monsters being the rarest. The star grade of a monster can be artificially raised by "evolution," which uses other monsters to raise the star grade and level cap of a monster, with the highest being a 6-star grade and a 40-level cap. Experience to raise the level of a monster can be gained from use in battle or by using other monsters as fuel to "power up."

Monsters come in five elements: water, fire, wind, light, and dark. Water monsters have an advantage in battle against fire and a disadvantage against wind, fire has an advantage over wind and a disadvantage against water, and wind has an advantage against water and a disadvantage against fire. Light and dark have advantage against each other, but deal regular damage to the other three types. Each monster also has a specific class, such as support, defense, health points, and attack.

In addition to evolving to a higher star grade, monsters can be "awakened," or transformed. The process requires essences associated with the monster's element (water, fire, wind, etc.) as well as a universal essence called "magic essence." These are obtained from a timed dungeon corresponding to each element. The Hall of Magic, where magic essence is acquired, is always open, and all element dungeons are open on Friday and Saturday. On Sunday through Thursday, one element dungeon is opened each day.

Monsters with higher natural star grades take more essences to awaken, but this is not affected by the player raising a monster's star grade through evolution. Awakening a monster changes its appearance and name, boosts its innate stats, and may add or improve a skill.

=== Runes ===
A core mechanic of the game is the use of runes. Each monster can accommodate six runes, which helps boost its innate stats. These can be upgraded using mana (in-game currency), which increases the stats runes provide. Similar to monsters, runes come in different grades, ranging from one to six stars. Higher-grade runes offer better stats, but cost more mana to upgrade and have a lower chance of being upgraded the higher the upgrade is, compared to runes with lower star levels.

All runes provide an additional bonus if the player attaches a complete set to a monster. For example, attaching two Energy Runes will give the monster a 15% health bonus, while attaching four Violent Runes gives the monster a 22% chance to gain an extra turn.

=== Multiplayer ===
Although the main storyline is single-player, Summoners War offers many cooperative and competitive multiplayer modes. They also added the new Tarturus Labryinth in the 2018 update.

==== Guilds ====
On July 1, 2015, Com2uS announced an update introducing guilds to the game. Although this early update only allowed players to join guilds in order to chat directly with other players, a larger update on March 9, 2016 added battling capabilities and a rewards shop. Players participating in a guild war set a defense consisting of two teams with three monsters each. Guilds battle against a randomly selected guild of similar ranking to earn points, which can be used to purchase prizes. Players are also able to participate in a siege battle, a 3 guild free for all with the goal of occupying the enemy guild's bases in order to gain more points. The first guild to reach 20,000 points wins the battle. If a guild is unable to reach the 20,000 points before the timer runs out, the guild with the most siege points wins.

==== Rift of Worlds ====
Rift of Worlds is a cooperative raid mode unlockable after completing a World Boss battle at least once, that pits teams of three players, each using a team of six monsters, against a three-headed boss. Players can position their monsters in the front row, where they'll receive more damage, or the back row, where they'll be safe from some incoming attacks. The battle commences in auto-mode, meaning the player has no direct input on what skills their monsters use.

Unique rewards that can be earned after winning a raid include rune grindstones and enchanted gems. Rune grindstones are used to boost a rune’s substats, while gems can be used to change a substat to a different one.

==== World Arena ====
The World Arena is a variant of the regular Arena mode where players face off against other players in real time (by default, up to 30 times a day). The two players take turns selecting a team of five monsters, with no duplicates allowed. After both teams are selected, each player bans one monster on the opposing team, and the match begins. The battle concludes when either player eliminates all monsters from the opposing team. The winner receives Victory Points and Medals according to their rank, while the loser suffers a small Victory Point deduction.

World Arena also includes a Goodwill Battle mode, which is unranked, and allows players to battle friends or other players as often as they wish. Additionally, players may view replays of their and other players' past battles, or watch battles in progress via Spectator mode.

== Development and release ==
Summoners War: Sky Arena was developed and published by Com2uS. It was planned and directed by Jeong Minyeong, the director of Homerun Battle series. The initial development took a year and a half. It was announced in February 2014, with closed beta running from 24 February to 2 March 2014. Summoners War was released on 17 April 2014.

As part of the developer's push to develop a global market, the game includes extensive language support and is available to play in 14 different languages. To increase brand awareness, Com2uS launched large marketing campaigns in overseas markets, such as North America.

== Reception ==
Summoners War has received positive reviews. Brittany Vincent gave the game 4 out of 5 stars, praising its high production value and interesting mechanics. Noting the oversaturation of the game genre, Vincent Haoson notes that Summoners War has "considerably superior graphics and production value". On a similar note, Nick Shively applauded the style of gameplay, stating, “What really separates Summoners War: Sky Arena from the rest of the mobile MMORPGs is the combat".

Shively also complimented the 3D rendering of the fights and monsters during combat. “I thought this was a pretty cool aspect, since most mobile MMORPGs feature card systems and you never actually get to see your creatures moving in 3D".

However, both Shively and Vincent point out that the high degree of grinding could put off many players. Speaking about the nature of collecting the strongest monsters, Vincent argues, “The game is clearly geared toward collecting as much money from its players as possible, but it's just as enjoyable without spending a dime".

Another criticism is the game’s generic story. While Haoson awarded Summoners War a perfect score, he describes the plot as “a mediocre and linear storyline to give the notion of progress and development as it takes the player from one map to the next".

=== Sales ===
The game has achieved top-10 status in over 84 countries in the Apple App Store and over 54 countries on Android. By November 2015, the game had reached over 50 million downloads. As of March 2018, the game has exceeded 90 million downloads worldwide.

By June 2017, the game had grossed over $1 billion in three years, including $890 million grossed overseas outside of South Korea. As of August 2018, the game has earned $1.35 billion across the iOS App Store and Google Play, including $370 million from the United States and $277 million from Japan.

== Sequels ==
- In 2021, a sequel named Summoners War Lost Centuria was released.
- In 2022, another sequel named Summoners War: Chronicles was released.
