= XS Software =

Bulgarian video game developer

- Company type: JSCo
- Industry: Video game development, publishing
- Founded: 2004
- Headquarters: Bulgaria
- Products: MMORPGs; Mobile games
- Website: http://xs-software.com

XS Software JSCo is a Bulgarian worldwide producer, developer and publisher of cross platform multiplayer online games. XS Software's headquarters are located in Sofia, Bulgaria.

== History ==
The company was founded in 2004 by entrepreneur Hristo Tenchev, who is also the CEO and created the first Bulgarian online browser game Bulfleet. After the success of the game, the team started working on more projects and the company continued to grow.

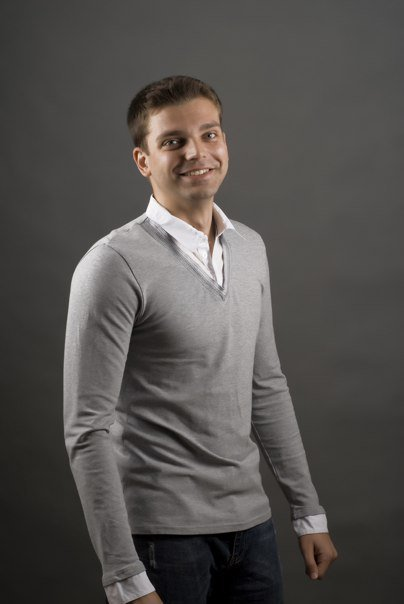
The company was founded in 2004 by Hristo Tenchev (CEO)

In 2005, the first version of the second title Khan Wars was released in Bulgaria and in 2008 the internationalization on Khan Wars began. The game was first released in Poland with the support of one of the biggest horizontal portals, Wirtualna Polska. The company was continuously growing by gaining more international investments, and in 2009, four new titles were released. Khan Wars was translated into 25 languages and released into more than 50 countries worldwide. In 2010, XS Software JSCo started the internationalization of all their games. The company translated its best performing games in up to 40 languages and they were subsequently released in 80 countries.

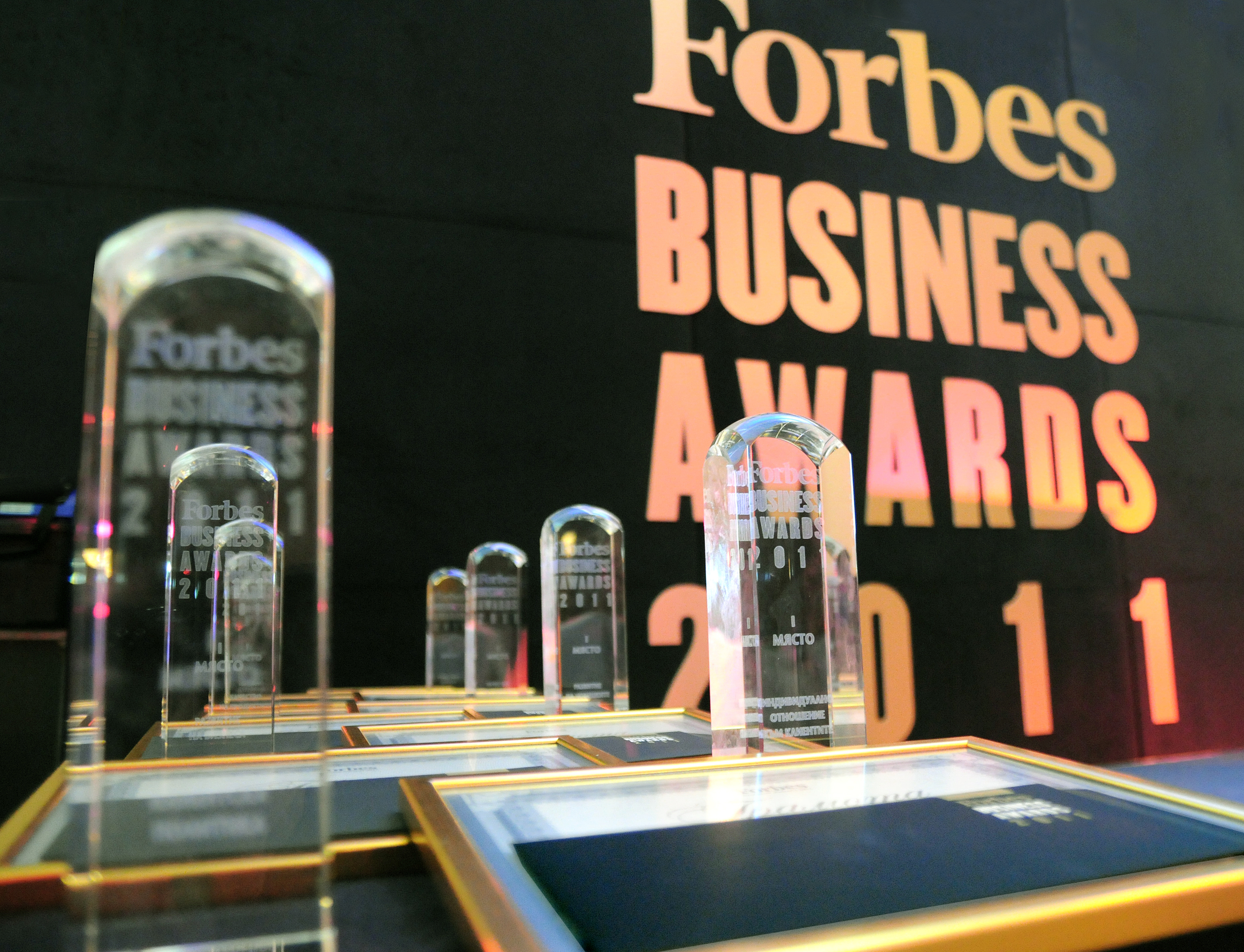
At an award gala held in 2011 by Forbes Magazine, XS Software was awarded with the Employee of the Year Award. The winner was Nadezhda Danabasheva, VP Games Management./ Photo: XS Software

== Games ==
Games developed by XS Software

- Khan Wars
- Lady Popular
- Nemexia (game)
- Andromeda5

Games published by XS Software

- Sofia Wars
- Taern
- Tropicalla
- Botva
- HeroZero

== Awards and nominations ==
2011 Forbes Magazine News- Forbes Business Awards

- XS Software was awarded with the Employee of the Year Award.

2011 BHRMDA News- Annual HR Awards

- In the category "Organizational architecture and design" XS Software won an award for the idea XS LEGO

== See also ==
- Massively multiplayer online game
- MMORPG
- Browser game
- Cooperative gameplay
- Multiplayer online game
- Online game
- Spawn installation
