= Hattrick (video game) =

1997 video game

- Developer: Hattrick Limited
- Designers: originally Björn Holmér, now Johan Gustafson
- Platform: Browser game
- Release: 30 August 1997 (V.1)
- Genre: MMOG

Hattrick is a browser-based massively multiplayer online football management simulation video game developed in Sweden and launched on 30 August 1997. The game contains 144 countries plus the Hattrick International (only for paying HT-Supporters), each with its own league pyramid, and 53 different language versions. As of October 8th 2022, the community of the game has 201,895 users worldwide, each with their own team. The number peaked in February 2009 with almost one million users. Hattrick has arranged 82 seasons as of November 2022, each lasting 16 weeks.

The game is free to play, though there is an optional premium supporter service that provides additional features, as well as a mobile service, both available by in-game purchase. As with any manager game, the player must assign positions to the players and choose among various tactical and strategic options. As stated by third-party web analytics providers Alexa and SimilarWeb, Hattrick is rated as the 360th and 584th most visited website in Italy respectively. In 2015, SimilarWeb rated the site as the most visited fantasy sports website globally, attracting almost 4.6 million visitors per month.

== Gameplay ==
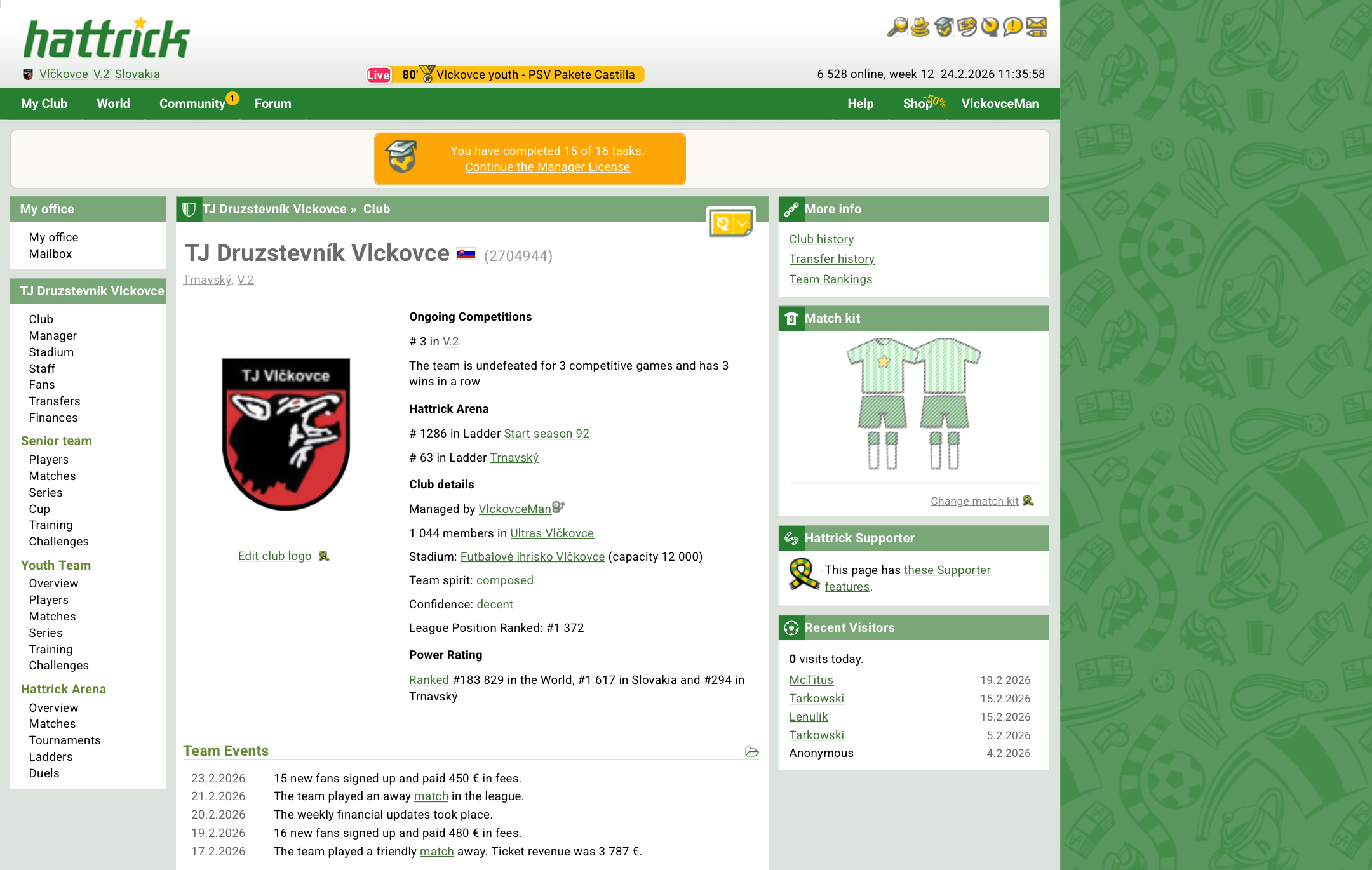
Screenshot of club profile on desktop.

Gameplay revolves around managing a football team, tasking the player with buying and selling players, setting the team's lineup, or expanding the arena to the perfect size, with each player having a team of their own. Many types of teams exist within Hattrick, with team types shaped by the training program set up by the player, as well as the formations played. Each included country has a league, which is divided into series. The series below the main divisions are also groups, where teams play each other in two legs, the number of sets and groups are defined according to the number of users in the country. Each included country also has a national cup that is played by all teams through a knockout system. The winners of the top division and cup of each country gain spots in the Hattrick Masters.

== Development ==
In April 2012, Hattrick Holdings was purchased by Zattikka, a casual gaming developer based in the United Kingdom, as part of its strategy to acquire established but "under-exploited" online games. As a preparation for the sale to Zattikka, the developers declared that they would not improve core features of the game for the foreseeable future (for example, postponing the announced new staff system), but instead focus on improving the experience for newer players coming into the game, as well as attracting new members and adding things, such as Hattrick gears, that users can pay for. The philosophy to not be able to pay for success still stands. In August 2013 the former owner group of Hattrick (which includes HT-Johan and HT-Daniel) reached an agreement with Zattikka to buy back the game.

== Reception ==
Hattrick has been studied academically, for example being used in a University of Helsinki case study into whether online simulation games, such as Hattrick, could be used as a business model for online betting and gambling businesses. The conclusion was "Online gambling on simulated sport events is a very interesting proposition with good prospects in the future; further research and piloting projects are however needed before one can give any conclusive answer to the actual future value of such services."

It has also been used as the basis for a Lund University academic paper, "Time Extraction from Real-time Generated Football Reports", presented at the Nordic Conference of Computational Linguistics in Tartu, Estonia in 2007.

== History ==
Hattrick was launched on 30 August 1997. Initially, Swedish was the only language available. In early 2000, the game development company Hattrick Extralives was founded.

In May 2001, the company presented Hattrick Supporter, a premium service that would be the main source of income for the company.

In February 2008, Hattrick launched a board game called Match of the Season. In 2011, Hattrick was voted the Most Favourite Simulation Game of 2011.
