= List of massively multiplayer online real-time strategy games =

This is a selected list of massively multiplayer online real-time strategy games. MMORTSs are large multi-user games that take place in perpetual online worlds with hundreds or thousands of other players.

== Business models ==
MMORTSs today use a wide range of business models, from completely free of charge (no strings attached) or advertise funded to various kinds of payment plans. This list uses the following terms.

- Free-to-play (F2P) means that there might be a cost to purchase the software but there is no subscription charge or added payments needed to access game content.
- Pay-to-play means that players must pay, usually by monthly subscription, in order to play the game.
- Freemium means that the majority of game content is available for free but players can pay for extra content or added perks.
- Absolutely Free means that the game is completely free to play with no option to pay for any extra content or services whatsoever.

== List of notable MMORTSs ==
Title	Developer	Status	Graphics	Setting	Subscription Model	Initial Release Date	Server Close Date	Platform	Notes
IAH: INTERNET WAR	Showrunner	Development	3D	Scifi	Subscription			Windows	
8Realms	Jagex	Defunct	2D	Historical	Free to play	May 5, 2011	July 1, 2012	Browser-based	
Age of Empires Online	Robot Entertainment, Gas Powered Games	Released	3D	Ancient	Free to play	August 16, 2011	July 1, 2014	Microsoft Windows	Official servers were closed, Project Celeste server emulator started in 2017 and still available for play.
Astrolords	Aratog	Released	3D	Space Strategy	Freemium	June 2014			
Battle for the Galaxy	AMT games	Released	3D	Intergalactic	Freemium	November 2014			
Beyond Protocol	Dark Sky Entertainment	Defunct	3D	Intergalactic		November 2008		Microsoft Windows	
Blitzkrieg 3	Nival	Defunct	3D	World War II	Buy game	May 2015	December 14, 2022	Microsoft Windows	
Boom Beach	Supercell	Released	3D	Contemporary	Freemium	June 26, 2014		Android, IOS	
Call of War	Bytro Labs	Released	2D	World War II	Freemium	October 21, 2017		Browser-based	https://www.callofwar.com
Cities War	Willy	Released	2D		Freemium	August 6, 2018		Browser-based	http://citieswar.com/
DarkSpace	Palestar	Released	3D	Intergalactic		December 21, 2001		Microsoft Windows	
Dawn of Fantasy	Reverie World Studios	Released	3D	Medieval		September 6, 2011		Microsoft Windows	
Dawn of Gods	Aeria Games, U9 Time	Released	2D	Real-Time Strategy		February 18, 2016		Android, IOS	
Dofus	Ankama	Released	Isometric 3D	Fantasy / Anime	Freemium	September 1, 2005		Cross-platform play	https://www.dofus.com
DomiNations	Nexon, Big Huge Games	Released	2D	Historical	Freemium	April 1, 2015		Android, IOS	
Dreamlords	LockPick Entertainment	Released	3D	Fantasy		February 15, 2007		Browser-based	
End of Nations	Trion Worlds	Cancelled	3D	Sci-fi		TBA			
eRepublik	eRepublik Labs	Released	2D	Contemporary	Free to play	October 14, 2008		Browser-based	
Evony	Evony, LLC	Released	3D	Historical		May 6, 2009		Browser-based	
Fatelords	Zygimantas Berziunas	Defunct		Sci-fi		2002		Browser-based	
Fief	Fief	Development	2D	Medieval	Free to play	2026		Browser-based	
Happy Farm	5 Minutes	Released	2D	Contemporary		Q4 2008			
Heroes of Gaia	Snail	Released	2D	Fantasy	Freemium	October 22, 2009		Browser-based	
Hyperiums	Hyperiums	Released	2D	Intergalactic	Freemium	January 2001			
Ikariam	Gameforge	Released	2D	Historical		February 2008		Browser-based	
Illyriad	Illyriad Games Ltd	Released	2D	Medieval fantasy	Freemium	March 31, 2011		Browser-based	
Imperia Online	Imperia Online JSC	Released	2D	Medieval	Freemium	August 23, 2005			
Imperium Galactic War	Kabam, Vavel Games	Released	2D	Sci-fi	Freemium	February 16, 2013		Browser, Windows, macOS	
Kingdoms Of Marazia	Fire Dragon Studios	Released	3D	Medieval fantasy	Buy Game	August 6, 2018			
Legends World		Released			Freemium	May 10, 2015			
Lord of Ultima	EA Phenomic	Defunct	2D	Medieval	Freemium	April 20, 2010	May 12, 2014		
Mankind	Vibes Online Gaming	Defunct	3D	Sci-fi		December 1998	October 2015	Microsoft Windows	
Mechhero	Intelligence Inside Solutions	Released	3D	Robots War	Freemium				Link -
Monopoly City Streets	Tribal DDB	Released				September 9, 2009			
Mudcraft	The LlamaPad	Released	2D	Fantasy		2004		Browser-based	
NeuroSlicers	Dream Harvest	In-Development	3D	Post Cyberpunk	Pay-to-play Free-to-start	TBA			http://press.dreamharvest.co.uk http://www.neuroslicers.game
OGame	Gameforge	Released	2D	Sci-fi		2002		Browser-based	
Pirates: Tides of Fortune	Plarium	Released	2D	Historical		2012		Browser-based	
Rivality	FunRock	Defunct	2D	Contemporary	Free to play	October 1, 2008	August 2022	Browser-based	
Saga	Wahoo	Released	3D	Fantasy		March 4, 2008		Microsoft Windows	
Samurai Taisen	PST Team	Released	2D	Sengoku period	Freemium	May 6, 2013		Browser-based	
Screeps	Screeps, LLC	Released	2D	Programming	Subscription	November 16, 2016		Microsoft Windows, MacOS, Linux, Browser	Live demo (no registration required)
Shattered Galaxy	Kru	Released	2D	Sci-fi		August 30, 2001		Microsoft Windows	
Society	Stardock	In-Development		Fantasy		TBA		Microsoft Windows	
Soldiers Inc.	Plarium	Released	2D	Contemporary		2013		Browser-based	
Sparta: War of Empires	Plarium	Released	2D	Historical	Freemium	2014		Browser-based	
Starborne: Sovereign Space	Solid Clouds	Released	3D	Intergalactic		April 2020		Microsoft Windows	
Starfall Online	Snowforged Entertainment	Released	3D	Intergalactic		February 20, 2020		Microsoft Windows	
StarPeace	Oceanus Communications	Released	2D	Sci-fi		2000		Microsoft Windows	City-building game, much like SimCity.
Stormfall: Age of War	Plarium	Released	2D	Fantasy	Freemium	2012		Browser-based	
Stronghold Kingdoms	Firefly Studios	Released	2D	Historical	Freemium	October 17, 2012		Browser-based	
Time of Defiance	Nicely Crafted Entertainment	Defunct	3D	Sci-fi	Buy Game	August 21, 2002	July 28, 2010	Microsoft Windows	
Travian	Travian Games GmbH	Released	2D	Historical	Freemium	September 5, 2004		Browser-based	
TribalWars	Innogames	Released	2D	Historical		2006		Browser-based	
Vega Conflict	Kixeye	Defunct	2D	Sci-fi		2013	May 15, 2026	Windows, Android, IOS	Purchasing was disabled on 2026.03.31
War of Legends	Jagex	Defunct	2D	Ancient China		January 19, 2010	December 22, 2014	Browser-based	Available in English and German
World War Online	Chilltime	Released	3D	Modern Warfare	Freemium	August 2010			Link -
X-Wars	Mediatainment	Defunct	3D	Modern Warfare	Freemium	August 2002	April 2012	Browser-based	
Ymir Online	Thibaud Michaud	Early Access	2D	Stone Age	Buy Game	March 2019			Link -
Guilds & Blades	Indie	Early Access	2D	Fantasy	Free to play	October 2026		Browser-based	Link -
Zandagort	Zanda Games	Defunct	2D	Sci-fi	Absolutely Free	Q3 2008	November 29, 2012		Available in English and Hungarian

== See also ==
- List of massively multiplayer online games
- List of free massively multiplayer online games
- List of free multiplayer online games
- List of multiplayer browser games
- Online game
- Strategy video game
- Real-time strategy
