= War Commander: Rogue Assault =

2016 video game

- Developer: Kixeye
- Publisher: Kixeye
- Platforms: iOS; Android
- Release: December 21, 2016
- Genre: Strategy
- Modes: Single-player, multiplayer

War Commander: Rogue Assault is a real-time strategy mobile game developed and published by Kixeye. It was released for iOS and Android on December 21, 2016. The game is set in a dystopian future where players must build and defend their own military base against enemy attacks while also attacking other players’ bases to gain resources and climb the ranks. Imperia Online JSC assumed full responsibility for operations starting from the second half of 2024. The game is a spin-off of War Commander.

== Gameplay ==
War Commander: Rogue Assault is a real-time strategy game that requires players to build and maintain their own military base while also attacking other players’ bases to gain resources and climb the ranks. Players can collect resources such as oil, metal, and Thorium, which are used to upgrade their base and units.

Players can also train and command a variety of units, including infantry, tanks, and helicopters, each with their own strengths and weaknesses. In addition, players can research new technologies and unlock new units to improve their chances of success in battle.

The game features both a single-player campaign mode and a multiplayer mode where players can join alliances with other players to take on more difficult challenges and earn more rewards.

== Development ==
Louis Castle was invited by Kixeye to give feedback on the game as a consultant and eventually became the creative director. Castle, who had previously worked on RTS games such as Command & Conquer, was drawn to the challenge of creating a deep and engaging RTS experience on mobile devices. He saw War Commander: Rogue Assault as an opportunity to push the boundaries of what was possible on mobile platforms and create a game that would appeal to both casual and hardcore gamers.
