= Secret society (disambiguation) =

A secret society is an organization with activities or inner functions concealed from non-members.

Secret society or Secret Society may also refer to:

== Arts, entertainment, and media ==
- Secret Society (album), a 2006 album by Europe
- "Secret Society" (Justice League), an episode of the animated series Justice League
- Secret Society, a BBC documentary series that led to the Zircon affair
- Darcy James Argue's Secret Society, an American steampunk big band
- Secret Society of Second-Born Royals, a 2020 American contemporary science fantasy action superhero film
- Secret Society of Super Villains, a fictional group of comic book characters
- The Secret Society, a 2015 book about Cecil Rhodes, by Robin Brown
- Secret Societies (Nephilim), a 1995 supplement for the role-playing game Nephilim

== Other uses ==
- Secret Society (Persia), played a role in the Persian Constitutional Revolution of 1905–1911

== See also ==
- Society (disambiguation)
- High society (disambiguation)
