= Stormfall: Age of War =

2012 video game

- Developer: Plarium
- Publisher: Plarium
- Composer: Jesper Kyd
- Platforms: Browser, Facebook
- Release: WW: 2012
- Genre: Massively multiplayer online real-time strategy game

Stormfall: Age of War is a social browser game created in 2012 by Plarium and then moved to Facebook in November. This game franchise builds on the success of Plarium's earlier Facebook titles in the crowded web-based PvP strategy game market, though a pay-to-win aspect of the game raises concerns. Plarium, which has a global registered player base of 250 million players, introduced Stormfall: Rise of Balur as the sequel to the hugely popular Stormfall: Age of War.

== Gameplay ==
Stormfall: Age of War challenges players to fortify an army and castle within the fictional Kingdom of Darkshine.

Players are required to employ strategy skills to build castles, manage resources, and participate in player-versus-player warfare under the guidance of Lord Oberon, protector of Stormfall. The game has a top-down isometric camera angle and retro style 2D graphics. Players' military units can raid enemy bases, defend their own base, and be used to participate in group warfare in a league system.

== Reception ==
Stormfall: Age of War

Review scores
Publication	Score
Gamezebo	2.5/5 stars
ComiConverse	3/5 stars
Browsergames.de	4/5 stars
GameRanks	6.8/10 stars
MMO Games	4/5 stars
Game Rant	3.5/5 stars

The game became one of the twenty fastest-growing games on Facebook globally, according to Julien Codorniou, Facebook's head of European platform partnerships in 2013. Pete Davison of Adweek called Stormfall "a very solid addition to the growing lineup of mid-core strategy titles on the social network" (referring to Facebook), and wrote that it "features solid gameplay, reasonable (if slightly inconsistent) presentation and plenty of things to do."
