= Louis Castle =

American video game designer

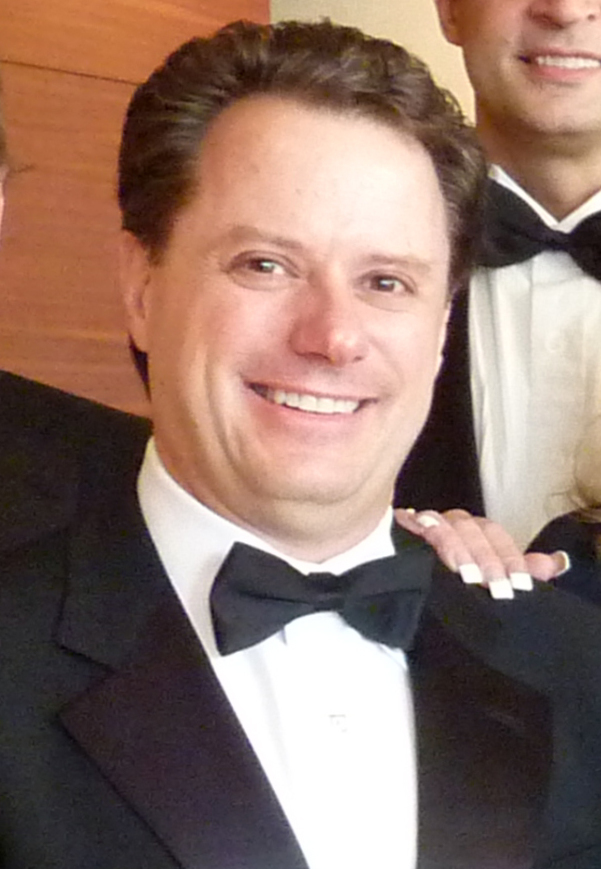
- Castle at a BAFTA event in Los Angeles in 2011
- Occupation: Game designer
- Known for: Co-founding Westwood Studios; Blade Runner

Louis Castle is an American video game designer. He is known for co-founding Westwood Studios, designing the PC game Blade Runner, and collaborating with Steven Spielberg on the Boom Blox and Boom Blox Bash Party video games for the Wii console based on Spielberg's design ideas.

== Career ==
Castle co-founded Westwood Studios with Brett Sperry in 1985. Castle has multiple credits on Westwood games, including executive producer, technical director, and art director for the 1997 video game Blade Runner. Castle is also known for his contributions to multiple games in the Command & Conquer series. Castle has emphasized that his artistic background significantly influenced his approach to game design, particularly regarding user experience (UX) and interface accessibility. He maintains that the success of titles like Command & Conquer was rooted in a philosophy where technical mechanics and intuitive visual design must be seamlessly integrated to lower the barrier for players.

Westwood was acquired by EA in 1998, and Castle continued on with EA in a number of executive and creative roles. He was executive producer of Boom Blox and Boom Blox Bash Party, developed for the Wii in a collaboration with Steven Spielberg. From 2003 to June 2009, Castle was Vice President of Creative Development at the Los Angeles studio of Electronic Arts (EA Los Angeles).

On July 15, 2009, Castle joined InstantAction as the new CEO of GarageGames. After InstantAction was shut down in November 2010, Castle went on to become Senior Advisor for Premium FanPage in January 2011, and later joined Zynga as VP of Studios.

Castle took a detour out of the video gaming industry to serve as Chief Strategy Officer for Shufflemaster (which became SHFL entertainment) in late 2011. He returned to video games as Creative Director for Kixeye's War Commander: Rogue Assault which launched worldwide in 2016.

On March 9, 2017, Castle became the head of the newly formed Amazon Game Studios Seattle.

== Ludography ==
Name	Year	Credited With	Publisher
Fraction Action	1986	artist	Unicorn Software Company
Mars Saga	1988	designer, artist, programmer	Infocom, Electronic Arts
Donald's Alphabet Chase	1988	designer, artist	Disney Software
California Games (Amiga port)	1988	artist, programmer	Epyx
BattleTech: The Crescent Hawk's Inception	1988	programmer	Infocom
A Nightmare on Elm Street	1989	art director	Monarch Software
DragonStrike	1990	designer, artist, programmer	Strategic Simulations
Goofy's Railway Express	1990	production design	Walt Disney Computer Software
Circuit's Edge	1990	art director	Infocom
Mickey's Runaway Zoo	1991	designer	Walt Disney Computer Software
Dungeons & Dragons: Warriors of the Eternal Sun	1992	designer, programmer	Sega
The Legend of Kyrandia: Hand of Fate	1993	art management	Virgin Games
Young Merlin	1993	producer, designer	Virgin Games
The Lion King	1994	creative director, producer	Virgin Interactive
Monopoly	1995	producer, designer	Hasbro Interactive
Lands of Lore: Guardians of Destiny	1997	producer	Virgin Interactive
Blade Runner	1997	executive producer, technical director, art director	Virgin Interactive
Lands of Lore III	1999	executive producer	Electronic Arts
Command & Conquer: Tiberian Sun	1999	voice actor	Electronic Arts
Pirates: The Legend of Black Kat	2002	executive producer	Electronic Arts
Command & Conquer: Renegade	2002	executive producer, designer	Electronic Arts
Command & Conquer 3: Tiberium Wars	2007	studio creative director	Electronic Arts
Boom Blox	2008	executive producer	Electronic Arts
Boom Blox Bash Party	2009	executive producer	Electronic Arts
War Commander	2010	creative director	Kixeye
War Commander: Rogue Assault	2016	creative director	Kixeye

== Recognition ==
Castle was given the second annual Lifetime Achievement Award by the Computer Game Developers Association at the Spotlight Awards in 1999. Castle was also given a BAFTA award (along with Steven Spielberg and Amir Rahimi) for his work on Boom Blox in 2009.

== Personal life ==
Castle lives in Las Vegas, Nevada with his family.

Castle was the Grand Master of Masons in Nevada in 2020.
