= The Society =

The Society may refer to:

- The Society (Church of England), an independent association of Church of England clergy and lay people
- The Society (TV series), a 2019 series on Netflix
- "The Society" (The Amazing World of Gumball), a 2015 TV episode

== See also ==
- Society (disambiguation)
