= Vega Conflict =

Defunct video game

VEGA Conflict
- Developer: Kixeye
- Publishers: Kixeye, Stillfront Group
- Platforms: Windows, iOS, Android
- Release: 2013
- Genres: Strategy, combat, wargaming
- Mode: Multiplayer

Vega Conflict was an online multiplayer game developed by Kixeye. The game officially shut down on May 15, 2026, and is no longer playable.

== Gameplay ==
Vega Conflict was an online MMORTS set in space. The player could choose to fight NPC or real players to gain resources and blueprints. The XP and medals were used to rank up on the leader board. The game included a variety of classes, such as frigates, corvettes, cruisers, destroyers, battleships, cutters, specialists, fighters, titans, rangers and debuffers. The fighters, titans, and rangers were only available from Tier 8 to Tier 12. Fifteen tiers of factions were in the game, each with their different ship classes. Sectors were the dividing blocks in Vega Conflict since fleets without flagships or dreadnoughts were unable to warp between them, but the player outpost could be relocated between sectors every twenty-four hours. Some events periodically occurred in which players could participate for prizes.
