= Imperial Hero =

2009 video game

- Original authors: Dobroslav Dimitrov, Moni Dochev
- Developer: Imperia Online JSC
- Initial release: 2009
- Platform: Web browser and mobile
- Available in: 27 languages
- Type: Massively multiplayer online role-playing game
- Licence: Freemium
- Website: www.imperialhero.com

Imperial Hero is a free-to-play, massively multiplayer online role-playing game (MMORPG) developed by the Bulgarian game production company Imperia Online JSC. The game was originally launched in 2009 after a year of conceptual and gameplay development. Imperial Hero is translated into 27 languages. In 2015 Imperia Online JSC released the remake of the role-playing game - Imperial Hero II, launched for Android, Facebook and web.

== Award nominations ==
"Bulgarian Game Awards 2016" Sofia, Bulgaria:

- Nominee for Best World
- Nominee for Best Visual Style/Art
- Nominee for Best Mobile Game

"TIGA Games Industry Awards 2016":

- Nominee for TIGA's Game of the Year Award
- Nominee for Best Strategy Game of the Year Award
- Nominee for Best Role Playing Game of the Year Award
