= Society (disambiguation) =

A society is a grouping of individuals who are united by a network of social relations and traditions, and may have distinctive culture and institutions.

Society may also refer to:

== Arts, entertainment, and media ==
- Society (film), a 1989 Brian Yuzna film
- Society (journal), an academic journal founded in 1962
- Society (magazine), an Indian magazine
- Society (play), an 1865 comedy drama by Thomas William Robertson
- "Society", a 1996 song by Eddie Vedder from the album Into the Wild
- "Society", a 2025 bonus track by The Weeknd from Hurry Up Tomorrow
- Society (video game), an online computer game by Stardock
- The Society (TV series), a 2019 teen mystery drama series on Netflix
- "The Society" (The Amazing World of Gumball), a television episode

== Other uses ==
- Housing society, a type of cooperative housing in India
- Learned society, an organisation that promotes an academic discipline, profession, or a group of related disciplines
- Society, a group of Christians similar to a church (congregation)
- Society Islands, a group of islands in French Polynesia
- Student society, a student club
- Society (horse), an American thoroughbred horse

== See also ==
- High society (disambiguation)
- Secret society (disambiguation)
- Society ball, a type of formal dance party
