= Pirates: Tides of Fortune =

2012 video game

- Developer: Plarium
- Platform: Web browser
- Release: WW: 2012
- Genre: Massively multiplayer online real-time strategy game

Pirates: Tides of Fortune is a massively multiplayer online real-time strategy game developed and published by Plarium. The game was released for web browser in 2012. The game is set in on fictional desert island where players build their own pirate bay, ships and fight against each other in sea-based battles.

== Story and gameplay ==
Pirates: Tides of Fortune is a nautical-themed social game. The game is geared towards interaction with other players, with frequent popups to remind players of the various benefits of having a large “crew” - primarily the ability to set up alliances. The game is set in a persistent world populated by other current and past players.

Players are expected to build fortified structures on land and equip a powerful fleet to gain control of the waters, with different buildings and ships to choose from.

== Music ==
The game features a fully scored soundtrack and sound composed and produced by BAFTA Award-winning composer Jesper Kyd. A track sharing the game's title is included on his 2015 album, Five Worlds of Plarium.

== Critical reception ==
Pirates: Tides of Fortune

Review scores
Publication	Score
Bild	4.6/5
Gamezebo	4/5
Browsergames.de	2.5/5

Pirates: Tides of Fortune has received generally positive reviews. Pete Davison of Adweek described the game as "a slick, polished new nautical-themed social game that takes its cues from more complex multiplayer strategy titles such as Kabam’s recently-closed Samurai Dynasty, Digital Chocolate’s Galaxy Life and Kixeye’s Backyard Monsters, and also praised the "very high" production values, detailed, well-animated artwork, and voiceovers. Karissa Leanne of MMO Games praised the "unique atmosphere," "great community," "outstanding graphics," and "fun battles."

The game was originally launched on Google+ exclusively for 30 days, before being launched on Facebook and VK.
