= Sigurlína Ingvarsdóttir =

Icelandic video game developer

- Born: 1978 (age 46–47); Iceland
- Occupation: Video game developer / Investor

Sigurlína (Lína) Valgerður Ingvarsdóttir (born 1978) is an Icelandic video game developer. She worked for EA DICE in Stockholm, Sweden, starting in 2012, and coordinated the development of Star Wars Battlefront (2015) and later of FIFA. Since 2021, she has been chair of Icelandic game developer Solid Clouds. Sigurlína is a founding partner at Behold Ventures, a venture capital fund investing in early-stage game companies across the Nordics.

== Biography ==
Sigurlína was born and grew up in Iceland. Growing up, she enjoyed horse riding, reading fantasy and science fiction, as well as playing video games, board games, and tabletop role-playing games. She graduated with a degree in industrial engineering from the University of Iceland in 2002. Her first job was as project manager with the Activis pharmaceutical company. Through friends working on EVE Online at CCP Games, she joined the company in 2006, rising to the level of senior producer.

After a spell with Ubisoft in 2011, in 2012 she joined DICE to coordinate Battlefront, which has enjoyed commercial success. After shipping the game, she moved to Vancouver to become Senior Producer for FIFA. She joined independent studio Bonfire Studios in California in the summer of 2018 and three years later was announced chairwoman of Icelandic game developer Solid Clouds.

Sigurlína is a member of The Future Is Ours campaign, which is concerned with carbon emission levels. She also served as one of the first chairs of the Icelandic Game Industry.
