= Vavel Games =

International game development company

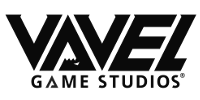
- Company type: Private
- Industry: Video games
- Founded: 2 January 2014; 12 years ago
- Founders: Mikolaj Marcisz; (Founder); John Balestrieri; (co-Founder); Brett Norton; (co-Founder)
- Headquarters: Washington, D.C., United States
- Area served: Worldwide
- Key people: John Balestrieri; (CEO); Mikolaj Marcisz; (CCO)
- Products: Imperium Galactic War
- Website: vavel.gs

Vavel Games is an international game development company with offices based in Washington, D.C., U.S., Rugby, UK and Warsaw, Poland.

The company is mostly known for being the developer and publisher behind the game Imperium Galactic War. Which they acquired in 2017 from Kabam, with the intent of relaunching the title. The deal was financed by Gold Town Games, a game development and publishing company from Skellefteå, Sweden.

== Games ==
=== Imperium Galactic War ===
Imperium Galactic War (abbreviated IGW) is a massively multiplayer online real-time strategy game by Vavel Games, originally developed and published by Kabam in 2013. The game runs on a freemium model, and is supported through the use of microtransactions. The game's trailer is narrated by American Star Trek actor, Jeffrey Combs.

The premise of the game is simple; players must choose one of three warring factions to battle against one another for supremacy within the Maelstrom Galaxy (the game's main fictional location). In the heat of the battle, all three factions must also face off against a common threat, known as the Imperium. Players begin by picking which faction they would like to be a part of. There are three factions. The Tyrannar Empire, The Sovereignty, and The Intergalactic Alliance. Whichever decision the player makes, will ultimately effect the way the rest of their game-play looks, feels, and functions. Each player has their own starbase, and fleets they have to upgrade in order to defend themselves from other players, or even attack other players and non-player characters (NPCs). Players can earn experience points and level up by upgrading their fleets and starbase, completing game missions, and engaging in live combat with other players and NPCs.

== Financing ==
Aside for the investment from the founders, Vavel has received investments from two publicly traded companies from Sweden including Gold Town Games and Gaming Corps.

=== Acquisition of IGW from Aftershock ===
On 24 March 2017, Gold Town Games has made an investment in Vavel Games, which enabled Vavel to purchase the rights to the game Imperium Galactic War.

=== Gaming Corps and plans for IPO ===
On 20 May 2018, the company Gaming Corps (NASDAQ:GCOR) has made a public announcement of a deal aimed at listing Vavel at a Swedish MTF stock exchange in 2018.
