= Illyriad =

- Developer: Illyriad Games Ltd
- Publisher: Illyriad Games Ltd
- Engine: ASP.NET MVC
- Platforms: Platform independent Web browser
- Release: February 22, 2010 (alpha); March 31, 2011 (beta); May 16, 2011 (v1)
- Genres: Real-time Strategy; Fantasy City-building Browser game
- Mode: Multiplayer MMORTS

Illyriad is a free to play massively multiplayer online persistent browser-based strategy game developed by the UK software company Illyriad Games Ltd, the company's first full online strategy game, first released in beta in 2010, and launched in 2011.

Unlike many browser games, there is no set goal. The game is played on an infinite-round basis—there are no resets planned.

Illyriad was showcased in the Mozilla Labs 2010 Game On Gallery and an IGF 2012 Main Competition Entrant.

== Gameplay ==
Full Illyriad interface in widescreen, focused on City map, with undocked Global chat on right

Ocean and an archipelago in the Illyriad world map

Illyriad is set in a persistent fantasy world – when a player logs out, the game continues. Players start with a single town in which they construct and upgrade buildings and conduct research to unlock new technologies. Player civilizations can be expanded by conquering cities, sending settlers to colonize new lands or claiming sovereignty to expand player influence. It has a gameworld of over 4 million squares - the majority of which can be settled with a city.

The game has four playable races, each with their own advantages and disadvantages: Humans, Elves, Dwarves, Orcs.

There are five basic resources: Wood, Clay, Iron, Stone and Food. They are generated by the Lumberjack, Clay Pit, Iron Mine, Quarry and Farmyard respectively. Mana and research are produced by the mage tower and library, and used for magic and research. Gold is the currency in the game, which is used to pay wage for troops, caravans and diplomats as well as in player to player trade in the marketplace. Advanced resources are built from basic resources: horses, livestock, beer, books, spears, swords, bows, saddles, leather armour, chainmail, plate armour and siege blocks. These are used in the construction of military and diplomatic units.

Illyriad Leather Armour market

It also has magic with several spell schools; a commodities trading marketplace and quests which are different based on player race.

Illyriad's military unit categories are: Infantry, Spearmen, Cavalry, Archers and Siege engines; with multiple strategies including attack, raid, feint, occupy, reinforce, blockade and siege. Combat is both PvP and PvE. Army commanders gain experience from combat which the player can use to train the commander's skills.

The "diplomatic" research options include: Spying, counter-intelligence, theft, sabotage and assassination.

With the right technologies researched, using an army a player can claim sovereignty on occupied territory for various advantages.

=== Technologies ===
Technology tree of Illyriad

Illyriad's technology tree has 400+ research options. They are categorized into 8 research areas: City, Diplomacy, Quest, Magic, Military, Trade, Crafting and Sovereignty. There are also discoveries which are found via quests.

To research a new technology, it is first necessary to research the prerequisite technology - also some technologies have a prerequisite building level that must be built (for example, Smelting can only be researched after Craftsmanship has been researched and the town has a level 7 Quarry).

Researched technology is on a per city basis, so when a player settles a new town, they must research the technology for that town separately. The game's technology tree displays all the non-discovery techs in the game and their relation with one another, and allows the player to queue up to 2 technologies per town for research. Discoveries when found are at that point revealed to the player and do not require to be researched.

Completed researches count towards the players overall research score.

=== Terrain ===
The outcome of battles is not determined only by the size of armies, but is also influenced by the terrain of the battle ground and types of units engaged. Units' offensive and defensive abilities vary with the terrain they occupy. For example: "mountains favour ranged units and nimble spearmen, and penalise cavalry heavily. Attacking swordsmen are also hampered by the passes, gulleys and canyons that make frontal assaults more difficult."

While there are many more terrain sub-types (e.g. Light Tropical Cover, Rockhewn Monastery, Dense Jungle, Dense Rainforest), the main overall terrains for combat purposes are:

- Buildings
- Plains
- Small Forest
- Large Forest
- Small Hill
- Large Hill
- Small Mountain
- Large Mountain
- Fresh Water
- Shallow Salt Water
- Tidal Water
- Ocean

=== Evolving World ===
The world of Illyriad is supposed to change and is supposed to evolve over time. Mysteries and special locations have been added to the world such as The Temple of Reason, The Heroic Statues and the Steamtastic brewery. In actuality, there are only a very limited number of "mysteries" and special locations and the map hasn't been evolving for years. All mysteries, except one that is unsolvable, have been solved and aren't really mysterious.

In June 2011 the geography of one part of the world became infected and changes on a daily basis.

=== Alliances ===
Players can form alliances, and are provided with alliance forums, chat and a central treasury. Alliances interrelationships begin neutral, but they can choose to enter different states with each other such as: Confederation, NAP or War.

As well as the "hard power" of alliances in war, diplomacy, protection and politics; alliances in Illyriad allow players to cooperate to achieve things that would be beyond them as individuals. This includes investigating and solving mysteries spread across the world and competing in server wide tournaments.

=== Political Intrigue ===
Alliances and individual players may also engage in territorial disputes and secret negotiations that influence the control of different regions of the game world. However, because of the game's large scale and realistic travel times for trade, diplomatic missions, and military movements, even large alliances may find it difficult to project direct power over areas far from their core territories.

=== Tournaments ===
Illyriad also features server-wide tournaments in which players compete and players are rewarded individually and at the Alliance level. These tournaments have been also used to introduce new gameplay dynamics like creature drops.

The tournaments have been month-long events and have been as follows:

- January 2011: The first tournament was an Alliance versus Alliance "Hold the Fort" event. Eight equidistant locations in the world acted as "forts", which had to be held by player's armies. At the end of the month the Alliance who had held a location for the longest was the winner of that "fort". Also a prize was given to the Alliance which had held the most locations for the longest time overall.
- April 2011: The second tournament was a Player versus Environment event which required players to combat NPC animal spawns and retrieve "anatomical specimens". Players were individually rewarded for being the greatest hunter of each creature type; having the largest collection and having the largest number of unique parts. Alliances received rewards for having the largest collection and having the largest number of unique parts between all the Alliances.
- June 2011: The third tournament was a Player versus All "Hold the Fort" event. The eight locations from the first tournament acted as spawn points for elementals, which would bind to the player holding the square and become a unit in their town. On these squares all Alliance affiliations were suspended so all players were hostile to each other on these squares. In addition to the elementals, at the end of the tournament players were also rewarded for each of the elementals they had bound and the top players from each square received a Tournament Winner's Statue placed at the winners' choice on any unoccupied map square within 10 squares of their Capital City. This Monument bears their name and is a permanent marker on the World Map.
- December 2011: The fourth tournament, "The Undead Horde", began with a live event when a rift opened in the map and skeleton armies came from it, attacking players. This tournament was centered around the individual commanders in players' towns, rather than at an alliance or a player level like previous tournaments. Players had to withstand attacks from the undead, preventing them from accessing activated standing stones. Prizes were given to the commanders who gained the most experience.
- February 2012: The fifth tournament was an Alliance Ground Control event across 37 squares, one per region on the map. The winners were based on the summed time of all the squares held over a month.

== Compatibility ==
Illyriad can be played in any web browser which supports the HTML standards; including mobile devices (e.g. iPad, iPhone, Android, BlackBerry). The game has a special Facebook-mode, using Facebook-specific features such as Facebook connect, game announcements and other community features. Illyriad is also featured in the Facebook application directory.

== Business model ==
The game does not use ads, and is fully funded by the optional purchase of "prestige" offering an advantage using microtransactions. This virtual currency can be purchased via PayPal, mobile payment using Fortumo, Google Checkout and Facebook Credits for Facebook players.

Research, troop builds and advanced resource production cannot be sped up through the use of in game currency.

== Development ==
=== Initial release ===
Illyriad began development in 2009, and was the first game developed by Illyriad Games Ltd. It began with 3 developers and 3 artists, however only 2 were full-time - with the others working at other jobs. The core Illyriad development team's background was from web and enterprise software, not games - and the initial content was provided by volunteers.

James Niesewand, Illyriad Games founder, described the process: "From start to finish it took us about a year to get something playable ... for us that was just the point at which we had something fun that people could enjoy. At that stage we put the game live, invited people to play, and worked on improving the game in line with the players’ feedback."

Critical development software included Microsoft ASP.NET MVC and jQuery. Illyriad uses Microsoft SQL Server for persistent game data.

=== Continued development ===
After initial launch, the development of Illyriad continued. The world was changed from being randomly generated into one which was fractally generated including topographical features: mountain ranges, lakes, forests, hills, oceans, islands, rivers etc. This was then followed by the introduction of biomes including desert, jungle, marshes and the polar north; as well as regions and NPC Factions.

Illyriad Games continued development with a team composed of remote workers in different countries and outsourced suppliers. They bought on board Quantic Labs for the graphics which were used to relaunch the user interface. Their "artists and writers [were given] a lot of creative freedom" when producing new graphics and content.

==== HTML5 Canvas ====
On 09 Aug 2011 the World Map changed from HTML DOM to HTML5 Canvas. This brought a number of changes:

- An increase of the map zoom by ten levels, allowing 25 levels of zoom and increasing the grid to 51 x 51 tiles.
- Drag and drop, and mouse wheel zoom of the world map in the style of Google Maps.
- Movement and continual updating of moving units
- 'Fog of War' visibility for diplomats

==== OpenId Support ====
On 19 Aug 2011 OpenID authentication was introduced for new and existing players to sign up or link their account using their Google, Yahoo, AOL, myOpenID, OpenId, Wordpress, LiveJournal, Blogger, Verisign, ClaimId, ClickPass or Google Profile accounts.

==== Avatar Graphics Update ====
Illyriad hired artists to improve their character portraits, which were released in August 2011.

=== WebGL + HTML audio ===
Illyriad Games have also released an early detailed working example of first person town experience with WebGL and HTML audio which demonstrates that large 3d scenes, texture decompression and deferred shading can be done in the browser with no plugins.

=== Further gameplay development ===
==== "Organic" Animal System ====
In April 2012 NPC groups changed from random spawns to growing, splitting and migrating populations, which players interactions directly affect.

==== Medals and UI relaunch ====
In June 2012 the Illyriad user interface was refreshed and friends lists and Alliance medals were introduced. The medal designer allows players to create personalized awards and titles for others.

==== Crafting 2.0 ====
In July 2012 minerals and herb patches appeared on the world map, with varying levels of scarcity - which players could control, harvest or destroy. Mineral mines were fixed points, and herb patches would disappear when depleted, but would grow while not over-harvested. These fixed geographical locations became desirable resource locations for players to gain control over from other players. NPC Animals also drop body parts and hides after combat.

These components could then be used to craft more advanced equipment to use in game. The list of tradable items increased from 17 to 300; and trade became conducted at geographically different trade hubs.

== Reception ==
Of the three games chosen to go with Massively on a trip to the desert island Illyriad was one of them: "...I would have to go with Illyriad, the fantastic browser-based city-builder.... Illyriad is a delight to play." and added: "Given Illyriad's realistic trade, amazing community, and variable-speed gameplay, I would be insane to leave this one off the list."

It was also selected for the top eleven (in no particular order) of Massively's Fifty games for the mobile lifestyle: "This little surprise [Illyriad] has taken hold of me. Imagine an epic RTS but with killer lore and an awesome community."

It was voted in the top 100 indie games and one of the top 2 MMOs of 2011 in IndieDB's Indie of the Year Awards and included in GameSpy's 101 Free PC Games of 2012.
