= Bonfire Studios =

California video game developer

- Type: Private
- Industry: Video games
- Founded: 2015; 11 years ago
- Founder: Rob Pardo
- Headquarters: Irvine, California
- Number of employees: 70+ (2025)
- Website: bonfirestudios.com/

Bonfire Studios is a video game development studio located in Orange County, California. It was co-founded in 2016 by former Blizzard Entertainment Chief Creative Officer Rob Pardo.

== History ==
After leaving Blizzard Entertainment in 2014, where he served as Chief Creative Officer and lead designer of World of Warcraft, Rob Pardo co-founded Bonfire Studios in 2016. In its initial funding round, the studio secured investment from various sources, including John Riccitiello, who was CEO of Unity Technologies at the time. Pardo was able to raise another $25 million from venture capital firm Andreessen Horowitz and video game developer Riot Games. "Bonfire" is a metaphor for the type of games that the studio wants to create: "Because what is a Bonfire? It's a place where friends gather, tell stories and grow closer together as friends. We want to create titles that have these communities that get behind the game and really last for a long time." For over a year, the highest priority was to build the right team, next to prototyping some ideas. In late 2017, the team included among others Josh Mosqueira (game designer of Homeworld 2, Company of Heroes, Far Cry and Diablo III), Min Kim (former CEO of Nexon America), Sigurlína Ingvarsdóttir (producer of Eve Online and Star Wars: Battlefront) and Morgan Webb (co-host and senior segment producer of Xplay).

In 2018, the studio started development of their first title, Arkheron, which was officially revealed in January 2025. The live-service game focuses on player versus player combat with a top-down view and it is being built with the Unity game engine. Private playtesting started in 2024. At the time of the announcement the team consisted of 70 people: 52 developers and 18 artists. Furthermore a successful Series B funding led by Andreessen Horowitz with participation from Founders Fund and Altos Ventures was confirmed. Drimage Corp will publish the game in Korea and Japan. During the GamesBeat Summit 2019, Pardo described the pitch process that they used for Arkheron: Everyone in the studio had the opportunity to pitch a game. Of the 40 original ideas, the studio chose seven to expand into full-fledged pitch decks. Everyone then ranked their favorites, and when they made the final decision, the result was fairly unanimous.
