= Starborne: Sovereign Space =

2013 MMO Space Strategy Game

- Developer: Solid Clouds
- Engine: Unity
- Platform: Microsoft Windows
- Release: April 2020

Starborne: Sovereign Space was a massively multiplayer, online real-time strategy game developed by Icelandic software company Solid Clouds. In 2013 Solid Clouds began pre production of Starborne with full production starting in 2016 and the first external Alpha that same year. It is currently in Beta. The game is set in a futuristic science fiction setting and the writing fits the genre of a space opera.

Starborne received favorable coverage by video game press for its sixth and seventh alpha development rounds. In April 2020 the game entered open beta, where it also received positive coverage from reviewers . The game has been described as "An four-week-long game of Civilization but set in space on a map with over 320 - 390 other players."

== Gameplay ==
Starborne: Sovereign Space is set in the far future where players take on the role of the leader of a stellar empire. Players have to compete against thousands of other players to help their alliance take control of the galaxy. Players are able to specialize in a variety of strategies and can focus on military, technological and economic domination.

Starborne: Sovereign Space has often been likened to a giant board game where instead of players taking their turns, time becomes the limiting factor, both in terms of travelling, gathering resources, and building up stations. Since the server is always ongoing during each round it allows players to dispatch orders and movements and then log off and return at their own convenience.

Sovereign Space core features include the placements of structures to gather resources, scan and map surrounding areas, expand and defend players' empires. Where a player builds up a new station also plays a big role in the game, both in terms of strategic location, gathering resources and manpower, and most importantly capturing victory points.

Another key feature of Starborne is the cards that can be gained via daily challenges or made with credits that in turn can be gained by the player doing missions around his bases or by breaking down already owned cards. Cards come in many varieties and can alter the way outposts and fleets operate, how stations gather resources and are defended.

The game has leader boards where each empire's progress is displayed but players win the game with their alliance. Joining an alliance, as that opens up a variety of diplomatic venues in the game.

Once the player has downloaded the client and logged on they are able to choose a side to play for the duration of the match. They can pick between the following teams: Union of Sol, Lunar Directorate, or the Martian Commonwealth and play their part in shaping the lore surrounding Sovereign Space.

Starborne: Sovereign Space offers six different factions to play and each has its unique advantages, and that in conjunction with upgradeable policy cards offers multiple ways to specialize.

Players can also purchase the following factions: Mars Prosper League, Tianchao, and XAOC. There are also four factions for the Dead Zone game variant: Gatos Fritos, Les Apaches, Nightcorps, and Surpasum. Each faction has unique characteristics.

After logging in players are able to access a tutorial that guides them through their first step in the game. Each game is designed to run for up to eight weeks. Players are also able to play a four-hour variant of Starborne in the “Dead Zone” game mode.

Players can play on many different servers but not more than one account per server.

== Game modes ==
Currently there are two game modes of Starborne.

=== Sovereign Space ===
This is a game mode that comes in a handful of variants but is designed to last between 4–10 weeks. In Sovereign Space, thousands of players compete to gain victory and forge alliances. The game has changed significantly since the alpha test. At the beginning of each standard game, every empire is granted beginner protection. It ends either when one player attacks another who does not have beginner protection, or after 5–7 days, depending on game server settings.

=== Dead Zone ===
The Dead Zone is a condensed game mode of Starborne designed to be played in a few 3–4 hours by up to 25 people on a small map based around a single system. There are no solar flares, missions or alliances in Dead Zone. Players are also limited to four factions: Gatos Fritos, Les Apaches, Nightcorps and Surpasum. The Dead Zone game mode also has environmental effects in the form of radiation that can spawn randomly, or be effectively moved from one location to another by player actions.

== The Lore ==
=== Sovereign Space ===
In the 25th century, humanity has mastered the stars. A galaxy-spanning network of colonies, outposts, and industrial hubs is connected by Tenebris-Rosen Bridges - tunnels in spacetime that allow faster than light travel. To generate the vast amount of energy necessary to open a bridge, massive Dyson Spheres must be constructed to harvest the power of a star.

Three major powers hold sway: the Union of Sol, a young, radical democracy controlling most of the inner colonies; the Lunar Directorate, a technocratic government and the ‘first nation’ of space; and the Martian Commonwealth, a loose collection of member territories committed to absolute sovereignty. Spanning the political divide are any number of pirates, mega corporations, and industrial complexes. Greatest among these are the “Sovereign Six”, independent organizations that boast their own networks of interstellar travel.

Along the outer frontier, unbound by any central authority, individual Commanders reign over small, blossoming empires in space. These intrepid explorers make war and broker peace, compete and cooperate, rising and falling like the tide. Their choices to determine the outcome of humanity's galactic ambitions.

=== Dead Zone ===
The Dead Zone is a sector of space that was previously designated for human expansion, but had a curious radiation phenomenon that rendered the area uninhabitable. This led to the galaxy agreeing to close it off for colonization.

However vast natural resources, combined with the potential scientific value of the radiation phenomenon, have led to a number of empires flouting the law and beginning colonization efforts.

More recently another incentive has revealed itself. Everliving, the loose alliance of the children of Mars has been active in the zone for quite some time now. While the exact purpose of their activity is unknown it has pushed those already interested in the Dead Zone to make a move.

The Dead Zone is covered with abandoned colonies, curious phenomena, and vast stellar graveyards from its early settlement attempts. It also has facilities hidden in its depths. These are all ripe for exploitation.

While there is no long-term solution to the radiation problem, several empires have come up with ways to cope with it. Being able to clean up, or tolerate radiation is the key to operating in the sector.

Because it is illegal to officially inhabit the sector commanders have had to secure the services of various organizations to covertly colonize the sector on their behalf. The player is one of those commanders.

== The map ==
One of the key elements of the game is the map, which was heavily updated for the beta release in April 2020. The map displays all of the information the player needs to make informed decisions and is broken up into sectors that have different attributes.

The map is built out of hexes. Players are able to build stations in order to claim a hex as their own, which is a unique feature. They are then able to improve those stations in order to provide a wide variety of bonuses. In addition, they can build a variety of outposts which allows them to specialize their station in a specific role.

Players are also able to discover missions around the map. These missions are events that provide the player with timed cards and other rewards. Finding missions is an important pathway to more resources.

== Victory conditions ==
At least one of the following three victory conditions are always present in the game.

Strategic Victory - is won by the empire or alliance with the most victory points.

Victory points are earned by capturing and controlling mysterious mechanisms and enigmatic mechanisms, which are worth 1 and 3 victory points respectively.

Dyson Victory - Is won by the empire or alliance with the highest level Dyson Shell in their Dyson Sphere.

Dyson Spheres are unlocked by controlling a certain amount of grand terrestrial planets that surround each Dyson Sphere. Spheres are levelled by building and upgrading the Dyson Shell building in each Dyson Sphere.

Territorial Victory - Is won by the empire with the most hexes claimed.

Players can claim hexes by building stations anywhere apart from the starting zones or Omega Sector.

== Policies ==
Policies are empire-wide buffs that unlock at a certain level. Commanders are able to unlock more policies as they level up. In order to use policies, a player must first join a faction, which opens up a unique set of policy slots depending on the faction. Policies fall into four categories: Military, Domain, Industry and Wildcard.

Each category has a wide variety of policies that can help players specialize their empire towards espionage, production, military, or tech builds.

== Factions ==
There are a total of six playable factions in Starborne, and four additional factions for the Dead Zone game variant. Each faction has a unique set of lore, features, policy slots, and ship effects.

=== Atlas Syndicate ===
Is a financial conglomerate with deep political and economic ties to almost every other faction in the Starborne universe. The Atlas Syndicate's commitment to a neutral political stance, combined with a highly favorable tax regime, helps to entice organizations of all stripes. This has helped the faction become outrageously wealthy.

The Atlas Syndicate leaves nothing to chance and their people live in a highly regulated society. The organization maintains significant surveillance networks and comes down hard on anybody seen as a threat to the stability of the syndicate.

=== Frontier Legion ===
The Frontier Legion was once the largest private military on the frontier, over the course of centuries as nomadic mercenaries the legionaries have begun to embrace permanent settlement. A deeply martial culture, the legionnaires now fiercely guard their new-found territory.

=== Terran Combine ===
The Terran Combine began life as an earth agency tasked with mapping the frontier for colonization. However, decades of isolation from earth influenced the combined society and soon the decision was made to declare independence from Earth. To this day the only thing protecting the Terran Combine from reprisals from Earth is its secretive methods of augmenting outposts.

=== Mars Prosper League (MPL) ===
The Mars Prosper League is an efficient mining conglomerate that will seek profits at any cost. This approach enables them to generate more resources than anybody else. In addition, they possess an impressive merchant fleet and are willing to fiercely guard their interests, with force if necessary.

=== Tianchao ===
The Tianchao clan is a powerful information broker dealing in espionage and blackmail. They can gather better intelligence than anybody else and excel at subterfuge and sabotage.

=== XAOC ===
The XAOCs are an extremely aggressive paramilitary faction. They are seen as little better than terrorists by other factions and they have little regard for niceties in warfare.

=== Dead Zone Faction ===
The Dead Zone is littered with environmental hazards, particularly radiation, and the factions represent this harsh reality. At the moment all Dead Zone factions are free to play.

==== Gatos Fritos ====
The Gatos Fritos are a wild group of bandits and thieves with a punk rock aesthetic. They share little in common with wider galactic society but are more than happy to take credits for any work they do.

==== Les Apaches ====
Les Apaches are affordable mercenaries by day, nature-worshipping cultists all the time. Their focus on recycling and salvaging is a decided advantage in the Dead Zone. Despite being mercenaries Les Apaches maintain a sense of honor and prefer to engage their opponents in what they consider to be honorable combat.

==== Nightcorps ====
Nightcorps are the denial action arm of the Atlas Syndicate. They use methods that would be considered reprehensible were they to see the light of day. Their parent company will not take responsibility for the Nightcorps actions even if they were to do so.

==== Surpasum ====
The Borts are the denizens of the Surpasum, they are only accepted when it is necessary to deal with radiation. Borts are derided for their physical appearance but they have managed to turn their unique physiology to their advantage and have begun to become a political power. They typically start from refugee camps, often based out of grounded ships, the Surpasum are named after one of these communities.

== Ships ==
Ships are produced via shipyard stations with certain default capacity. Both ships and shipyards can be affected by buildings and policies. It is possible for players to queue ships even if they do not currently have all the resources for the ship on hand.

All ships fall into one of three categories:

Light Ships - Represent small ships that can be constructed on any station at any level.

Heavy Ships - Represent larger ships that need a level 4 station with a tier 4 military outpost and Heavy Ship Assembly, some have additional requirements.

Capital Ships - Represent enormous ships that only the wealthiest of empires can use. Players need an empire leader of level 50 and the empire's unique outpost, Capital Ship Assembly.

Ships function by joining a fleet, which must contain at least one ship and have access to supplies. Additional requirements are determined by the type of movement which falls into 6 categories, with various sub-categories.

- Attack - Any movement designed to aggressively interact with a player or NPCs.
- Exploration - Movements designed to complete missions, discover information, or access solar flares.
- Construction - Allows players to build or change assets.
- Deploy - Allows players to deploy their fleets to different stations.
- Clear Radiation - Allows players to remove radiation from the path, making that hex claimable.
- Sow Radiation - Allows players to add radiation to the map, making an area inaccessible for station construction.

== Resources ==
In Starborne, resources are found on planets, moons and in resource fields around the map. They can also be gathered from solar flares, or via buildings and outposts with the correct cards. Resources are either primary resources, which can be freighted or secondary resources which cannot. Starborne has three primary resources: Metal, Gas, Crystal and one secondary resource Ice.

== Buildings ==
Whenever a player places a station in order to take control of territory they are able to place buildings. These are accessed via Starborne's building planner. They can be upgraded or downgraded and fulfill a wide variety of purposes.

Buildings in Starborne fall into five categories:

- Military buildings - Provide bonuses to fleets or unlock new military ships.
- Domain buildings - Provide bonuses to espionage/stealth and Scout or Recon ships.
- Industry buildings - Provides bonuses to cargo capacity, solar flare harvesting, or other economic goals.
- Production buildings - Designed to create new resources.
- Unique buildings - Provide significant bonuses to that station or unlock specific empire-wide abilities.

A subset of buildings are organizations. These are special buildings you can construct in your stations that can add various gameplay effects. Organizations require a minimum station level equal to the tier of the organization.

== Development ==
Starborne: Sovereign Space is currently undergoing development by the Icelandic gaming studio Solid Clouds. It is the company's first game, although the development team has included members of the team behind EVE Online: Hrafnkell Oskarsson, CCP's first game designer, and Ásgeir Ásgeirsson the art director of Eve-Online.

In an interview with wfmag.cc issue 34, lead designer and Solid Clouds CEO Stefán Gunnarsson stated that Starborne was an idea “born out of frustration” with the direction that the MMORTS genre had taken since its heyday. He saw that while MMORPGs had stagnated, there were a number of very enjoyable single-player RTS games being invented. In 2013 Solid Clouds was founded to create a game that would combine an MMO with the deep strategic gameplay of a single-player RTS.

Starborne's first open alpha was in 2016. It went through nine alpha development rounds before finally being released as an open beta in April 2020. The game has continued to be refined over the course of the open beta.

== Reception ==
Starborne has received favorable coverage by video game press for its sixth and seventh alpha development rounds. it also received generally positive feedback from game reviewers. This included generally positive feedback from big gaming publications such as Rock Paper Shotgun and PCGamer.

Typically reviewers have praised the game for its in-depth approach to strategy and more calm pacing compared to similar titles, such as Neptune's Pride. The game has also received positive feedback for its focus on grand scale strategy combined with the deeply personal interactions, including deception, found in EVE online. Certain reviewers have also positively compared the gameplay in Starborne to tabletop games.
