= Storm8 =

American mobile social game developer

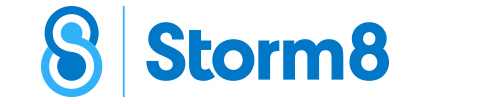
- Industry: Video games
- Founded: 2009; 17 years ago in Redwood Shores, California
- Founders: Garrett J. Remes, Perry Tam, William Siu, Chak Ming Li, Laura Yip
- Headquarters: San Mateo, California
- Parent: Stillfront Group
- Website: www.storm8.com

Storm8 Inc. is a mobile social game developer founded in 2009 by former Zynga designer, Garrett J. Remes, as well as former Facebook engineers, including Perry Tam, William Siu, Chak Ming Li, and Laura Yip in Redwood Shores, California. Notable games include the Restaurant Story franchise, Dragon Story, Bubble Mania, Fantasy Forest Story, Castle Story and iMobsters.

In 2015, the company had more than 50 million monthly active users and more than 1 billion downloads on iOS and Android. The company also published games under the TeamLava, Shark Party and FireMocha brands, until it consolidated it under Storm8 Studios in March 2015.

== History & milestones ==
In June 2011, Storm8 was one of the first free-to-play mobile game publishers to announce that it earned $1 million in a single day. The following year, technology news site TechCrunch referred to Storm8 as the "quiet mobile gaming giant" for successfully building one of the biggest mobile social gaming networks without raising any venture capital funding, and remaining relatively quiet with the press.

In December 2012, the company celebrated 2 million game downloads in one day.

In January 2020, Storm8 was acquired by Stillfront Group for US $300 million. The acquisition was completed in February 2020.

== Expansion moves ==
In 2014 the company appointed game industry veterans, adding Disney, EA and Zynga experience to its leadership team.

The company announced a deal with Hasbro Inc. in December 2014 to launch Monopoly Bingo! and Clue Bingo! on iOS and Android. These games were later rebranded as Bingo Tycoon! in January 2021.

In June 2019, the company partnered with the Property Brothers to launch Property Brothers Home Design on iOS and Android.

== Games ==
Title	Year	Platforms
Property Brothers Home Design	2019	iOS & Android
Home Design Makeover	2018	iOS & Android
Dream City: Metropolis	2016	iOS & Android
Bakery Story 2	2015	iOS & Android
Frozen Frenzy Mania	2015	iOS & Android
CLUE/CLUEDO Bingo (discontinued)	2015	iOS & Android
Polar Pop Mania	2015	iOS
Hungry Babies Mania	2015	iOS & Android
Fortune Slots	2015	iOS 10 or earlier
Diamond Quest	2015	iOS & Android
Restaurant Story 2	2014	iOS & Android
Bingo Tycoon (formerly known as MONOPOLY Bingo)	2014	iOS & Android
Fish Frenzy Mania	2014	iOS
Fantasy Forest Story	2014	iOS & Android
Cupcake Mania	2014	iOS & Android
Fruit Splash Mania	2013	iOS 10 or earlier
Hidden Objects: Mystery Crimes	2013	iOS 10 or earlier
8Ball by Storm8	2013	iOS 10 or earlier
Match the Dots by IceMochi	2013	iOS
Candy Blast Mania (also known as Sugar Swap Mania)	2013	iOS & Android
Farm Story 2	2013	iOS & Android
Word Scramble	2013	iOS
Fruit Mania	2013	iOS 10 or earlier
Word Search Puzzles	2013	iOS & Android
Solitaire Classic Card Game	2013	iOS & Android
Bingo!	2012	iOS & Android
Jewel Mania	2012	iOS & Android
Castle Story	2012	iOS & Android
Home Design Story	2012	iOS
City Story Metro	2012	iOS 10 or earlier
Bubble Mania	2012	iOS & Android
Poker	2012	iOS 10 or earlier
Dragon Story	2012	iOS & Android
Pet Hotel Story	2012	iOS 10 or earlier
Slots	2012	iOS & Android
Pet Shop Story	2011	iOS & Android
Zoo Story 2	2011	iOS 10 or earlier & Android
Fashion Story	2011	iOS & Android
Bakery Story	2011	iOS & Android
Restaurant Story	2011	iOS & Android
Farm Story	2010	iOS 10 or earlier & Android
