= Dawn of Fantasy =

2011 video game

- Developer: Reverie World Studios
- Publisher: 505 Games
- Designers: Christopher Theriault; Konstantin Fomenko (Producer); John Lockwood (Technical Director)
- Platform: Microsoft Windows
- Release: September 6, 2011
- Genre: MMORTS
- Modes: Single-player, Multiplayer

Dawn of Fantasy is a massively multiplayer online real-time strategy (MMORTS) game set in a medieval high fantasy setting. The game was developed by Canadian company Reverie World Studios for Microsoft Windows and released in 2011. An Xbox 360 version was initially planned but later cancelled.

== Gameplay ==
Dawn of Fantasy has three playable races: Men, Elves, and Orcs. The economy of Dawn of Fantasy revolves around four primary resources: food, wood, stone, and gold. Dragons and Dwarves were originally planned as playable races, but were cut due to a lack of resources.

=== Single-player ===
Dawn of Fantasy has different single-player game modes including Kingdom Wars, Lay Siege, Castle Defense and Custom Scenarios.

In Kingdom Wars mode, players capture other cities (in any order they choose) through battle or diplomacy while fending off AI attacks. Players choose their race (Humans, Elves or Orcs), choose their starting city (4 per race) and choose which campaign they wish to play: Union War, Realm War, or Epic War. In Union War, players conquer all the cities of their race to unite their realm. In Realm War, players start off with their race united and allied, and must conquer the other realms. In Epic War, players start with one city and must conquer the world.

In Lay Siege mode, players attack one of the 12 major cities of the game world.

In Castle Defense mode, players defend one of the 12 major cities of the game world.

In Custom Scenarios mode, players are able to design their own maps with the Scenario Editor. The Scenario Editor is the same tool used by the developers to create all the town, city and quest scenarios in the game. The Editor uses the easy-to-learn Lua scripting language.

Dawn of Fantasy includes tutorial maps that provide players with an introduction to various game concepts, such as Constructing Buildings, Commanding Units, Gathering Resources and Siege Mechanics.

=== Multiplayer ===
Multiplayer action in Dawn of Fantasy takes place in the "Online Kingdom". The Online Kingdom provides players with a persistent world in which, after having chosen their race (Human, Elf or Orc) and their starting region (3 per race), their goal is to grow a small village into a citadel as they battle other players for resources and complete quests in the service of Wizards, Kings and other adventurers. While in multiplayer mode, players can choose to go solo and complete PvE quests or siege cities by themselves. Players can also battle each other, complete quests together or join to attack one of the major NPC cities.

=== Game Editor ===
Dawn of Fantasy includes a scenario editor, which utilizes the Lua script language.

In addition to the scenario editor the game includes other tools, including a model animation viewer.

== Development ==
Development of Dawn of Fantasy began in 2001 by a group formed out of members of an Age of Empires II: The Age of Kings scenario editing community, forming a team led by Micah Hymer, John Lockwood and Kristo Vaher. Originally intended as a medieval strategy game, the project was reinvented as a fantasy game in late 2002. As an independent studio for the vast majority of DoF's development, Reverie World Studios (originally, Reverie Entertainment) obtained funding from the Canadian Government's Telefilm Grant. Dawn of Fantasy was signed by Lighthouse Interactive, which filed bankruptcy shortly after the deal was made. On September 1, 2012, game was submitted to Steam via Greenlight. On 30 November, Dawn of Fantasy became one of the first 50 titles to be voted onto Steam by the gaming public, when Valve announced the third set of games to receive the greenlight

The original audio score for Dawn of Fantasy was composed by Joel Steudler and the game was made using the Mithrill game engine developed by John Lockwood.
