= Soldiers Inc. =

2013 video game

- Developer: Plarium
- Platform: Browser
- Release: WW: 2013
- Genre: Massively multiplayer online real-time strategy game (MMORTS)

Soldiers Inc. is a Massively multiplayer online real-time strategy game (MMORTS) developed and published by Plarium. The game was released in August 2013 and is designed for use on web browsers. The game is military themed and set in the fictional country of Zandia, where players compete for control of the land's rich mineral fields. The game was named by Facebook as one of the top social games on its platform in 2013. The successor Soldiers Inc.: Mobile Warfare was published in October 2016.

== Gameplay ==
Soldiers Inc. gameplay involves fighting criminal organizations, corrupt corporations and foreign governments to gain control of the rich mineral fields in the fictional setting.

In 2015 20th Century Fox and Plarium collaborated to lend the themes and experiences of the Alien vs. Predator (AVP) franchise into Soldiers Inc., with Mike Doyle of 20th Century Fox saying “Soldiers Inc. has the perfect mixture of thrilling and engaging gameplay that is perfectly in step with the Alien vs. Predator franchise.”

Music for the game was composed by the award-winning Danish composer and sound designer, Jesper Kyd.
