= Starfall Online =

- Developer: Snowforged Entertainment
- Engine: Unreal Engine 4
- Platform: Microsoft Windows
- Release: 20 February 2020
- Genres: MMORTS, Real-time strategy, wargame
- Mode: multiplayer

Starfall Online (formerly Starfall Tactics) is an MMO real-time strategy video game with wargame elements, that mixes intense tactical combat with in-depth spaceship customization. The project is developed by independent Russian company Snowforged Entertainment.

== Gameplay ==
In Starfall Online players participate in a centuries-old confrontation between three rival factions - Eclipse, Vanguard and Deprived. One can assemble a unique fleet using a variety of blueprints and travel across the galaxy or battle against other players in quick and Ranked matches.

Due to the elaborate physical model, the game provides a variety of interesting tactical choices. The collision system allows ships to ram each other very effectively, gives them line of fire - to evade flying projectiles and be attentive to the positioning of all units in the fleet, and tactical units - to run the ship's self-destruction system right in a crowd of enemies, create a couple of invisible scouts, make quick tactical moves via warp jumps and more actions. Also, absolutely all components of the spacecraft in Starfall Online can be destroyed - from shield generators and special modules to weapons and engines. If an enemy ship is trying to escape, players can take out its engines.

Every player, his fleet and individual ship in this fleet will have their own progression, opening additional opportunities for customization and creating unique playstyles.

Developers also announced their intention to create a clan system with a war for territories and precious resources in the Outer space.

== Spaceships ==
The whole gameplay in Starfall Online is built around a Commander who has a fleet consisting of several ships. All ships can be fully customized - from choosing weapons, to installing engines, armor and special modules. There is no special separation for ships to "tank, support and damage dealer" - instead, ships are divided into several classes depending on their size:

- Frigate - a 250m long ship. Very fast and maneuverable.
- Cruiser - a 400m long ship.
- Battlecruiser - a 500m long ship, serving as the main strike force in most fleets.
- Battleship - a 750m long ship.
- Dreadnought - a 1000m long ship, able to equip the biggest weapons and modules.
- Carrier - a 1200m long ship which can carry squads of smaller vessels.

Each individual ship can have 4 modifications, chosen from five: Standard, Long Range modification, Assault, Spec Ops and Stealth. in addition to size every ship in Starfall Online has a set of characteristics: Shields hit points, Armor hit points, Structure hit points, Maximum speed, Angular speed, acceleration time, deceleration time, mass, capacity and crew - all of them can be changed through installing different modules.

== Customization ==
Everything in the game, from the hull of your ship down to the individual engines, can be customized. Each ship has weapon bays, engineering bays and engine bays which can be filled with hundreds of different modules, all divided to several classes:

- Engines - defines ships' maximum speed, angular speed, acceleration and deceleration time.
- Shields - the first energy layer of defence. Protects your ship from any type of damage.
- Shield Regenerator - allows your shields regenerate with time, passively.
- Armor - protects your ship from kinetic damage, allows ram more effectively, but takes more energy damage.
- Weapons - Beams, Cannons and Missiles - can be installed on your ship and basically help you killing enemy units.
- Special Equipment - modules which give you additional active or passive abilities. Like warping, boarding, stealth, advanced sensors, self-destruction, anti-missile system, mines, stasis, kinetic wall and many others.

Each module and ship hull is represented via cards - blueprints. A huge number of module combinations allows to create truly unique fleets and directly influence your strategy against opponents by creating new ship builds.

== Development ==
Development of Starfall Online has begun in late 2014. Starfall Online was first announced in January 2015, at the same time the first trailer released. In May 2015 the game was released for the additional funding on Kickstarter, which was planned to be spent on the development and extension of MMO-component of the game. The project was only half-funded, but according to the developers of the game, their goal - to attract world attention to the project - have been achieved.

At the same time, Starfall Online has been greenlit in just 9 days and announced to be available on Steam.

The game was developed using Unreal Engine 4.

Alpha testing of the game started in November 2018.

The game was released on 20 February 2020.

== Requirements ==
OS: Windows 7, 10 64-bit
Processor: Dual-core 2.0 GHz or better
Graphics: NVIDIA GeForce 470 GTX or AMD Radeon 6870 HD or newer
Memory: 4 GB RAM
