= Rob Pardo =

American video game designer

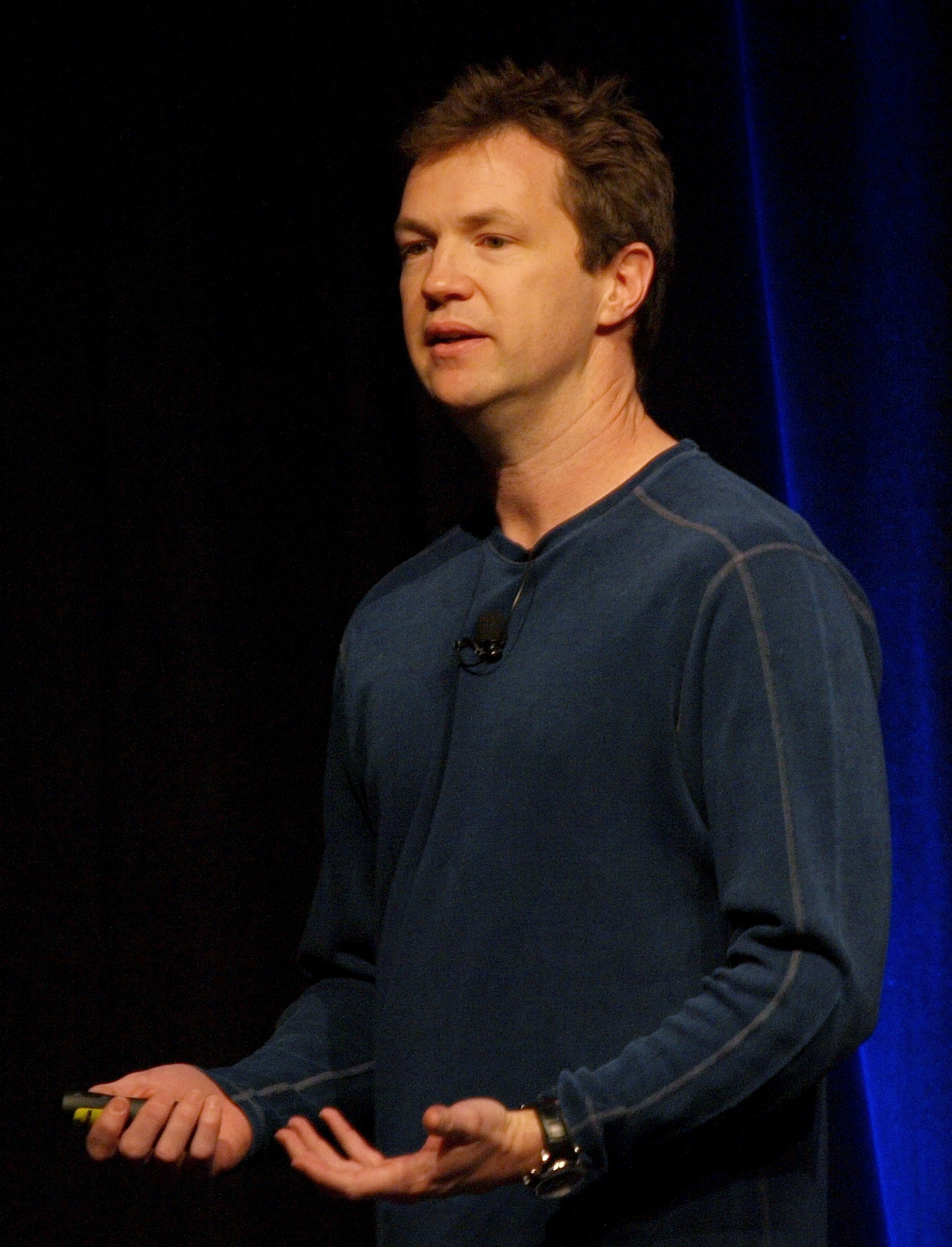
- Pardo speaking at Game Developers Conference 2010
- Born: June 9, 1970 (age 56); California, United States
- Occupation: Game designer
- Employer(s): Bonfire Studios (2016-); Blizzard Entertainment (1997-2014)

Rob Pardo (born June 9, 1970) is an American video game designer who is the founder of Bonfire Studios. He previously served as Chief Creative Officer of Blizzard Entertainment until resigning in 2014 after nearly 17 years with the company.

== Early life ==
Born on June 9, 1970, in Southern California, Pardo became interested in game design after serving as Dungeon Master for his friends' Dungeons & Dragons games. In a 2014 interview, Pardo reflected that his competitive nature came from being the only child of his similarly competitive father. Dissuaded by the difficulty of becoming a film director, Pardo attended the University of California, Irvine, intending to become a lawyer. However, he joined Interplay Entertainment after seeing a co-worker at his electronics store job apply at the video game developer.

== Blizzard Entertainment ==
After briefly working at Interplay, Pardo was hired by Blizzard Entertainment in 1997 because of his skill at real-time strategy games. After working as a developer on StarCraft, Pardo was elevated to lead designer of its Brood War expansion and Warcraft III: Reign of Chaos. Next promoted to Vice President of Game Design, Pardo used his experiences playing EverQuest to guide development of World of Warcraft. In 2006, he was named on the Time 100 annual list of influential people, though Blizzard staff criticized Time magazine for attributing their collective work to a single individual.

After the 2005 closure of Blizzard North restarted development of Diablo III, Pardo recruited Jay Wilson from Relic Entertainment to direct the game. Pardo was also responsible for proposing the game's controversial auction house, which would ultimately be removed in 2014.

In 2008, Pardo initially supported development of a digital client for the World of Warcraft Trading Card Game, but he reassigned its developers to the Battle.net platform the following year. This pause would ultimately prove beneficial to the development of Hearthstone as a distinct game.

After the success of World of Warcraft, Pardo began planning for Blizzard's successor MMORPG under the code name Titan. However, frequent disagreements with lead writer Chris Metzen led to development hell with staff divided between incompatible visions. In 2013, Pardo was named Chief Creative Officer, and he used this new authority to reboot development of Titan. On July 3, 2014, Pardo left Blizzard, partially under pressure from Blizzard CEO Michael Morhaime to resign. Despite criticism of Pardo's leadership, the Titan project would ultimately be reworked into the hero shooter Overwatch under the supervision of Jeff Kaplan, who Pardo had recruited. Pardo met Kaplan through their EverQuest guild, Legacy of Steel, which was well-known for its world-first completions, and he initially hired Kaplan as a World of Warcraft quest designer.

== Later work ==
In 2016, Pardo founded Bonfire Studios and raised $25 million in funding from venture capital firm Andreessen Horowitz and video game developer Riot Games. In December 2021, Pardo invested in Bright Star Studios, which developed the MMORPG Ember Sword until its cancelation in May 2025.
