= Goodgame Studios =

German video game company

- Website type: Private
- Available in: 26 languages
- Founded: June 2009; 17 years ago
- Headquarters: Hamburg, Germany
- No. of locations: 3 (Hamburg, Tokyo, Seoul)
- Area served: Worldwide
- Owner: Stillfront Group
- Founders: Kai Wawrzinek; Christian Wawrzinek; Fabian Ritter
- Key people: Oleg Rößger (CEO); Verena Schnaus (CFO)
- Industry: Mobile and browser games
- Products: Goodgame Empire; Empire: Four Kingdoms; Goodgame Disco; Goodgame Fashion; Goodgame Gangster; Goodgame Big Farm
- Revenue: ▲EUR202 million (2014); EUR27,972 million (2012)
- Operating income: EUR13.4 million
- Employees: 270 (2024)
- Website: www.goodgamestudios.com
- Advertising: yes
- Registration: yes

Goodgame Studios is an online games company founded in 2009 by Kai Wawrzinek, Christian Wawrzinek and Fabian Ritter. The company is based in Hamburg, Germany, and part of the Stillfront Group since 2018. The company has created or acquired the rights to eight games, including Goodgame Empire, Jump Jupiter, Goodgame Big Farm, Goodgame Galaxy, Goodgame Hercules, Goodgame Gangster, Goodgame Disco, Goodgame Café, Goodgame Farmer, Goodgame Farmfever, Goodgame Fashion, Goodgame Poker, Shadow Kings: Dark Ages, Legends of Honor, and Infernals. Goodgame Farmer was discontinued on February 28, 2013, while Goodgame Café, Goodgame Disco and Goodgame Fashion were deleted on November 3, 2016. Jump Jupiter, Goodgame Hercules and Goodgame Farmfever were also removed. The company's lifetime revenue crossed $1 billion in November 2017.

In December 2017, Stillfront Group AB, located in Stockholm, Sweden, acquired Goodgame Studios.

== Available games ==
=== Browser ===
- Goodgame Poker (2009)
- Goodgame Empire (2011)
- Goodgame Big Farm (2012)
- Big Farm Story (2020)

=== Mobile ===
- Empire: Four Kingdoms (2013)
- Big Farm: Mobile Harvest (2017)

=== Discontinued Games ===
- Jump Jupiter (2009)
- Goodgame Farmer (2010) (Note: Replaced with Goodgame Big Farm in 2013.)
- Goodgame Gangster (2010) (Note: Previously named Goodgame Mafia.) (Note: Closed in June 2026.)
- Goodgame Café (2010)
- Goodgame Disco (2010)
- Goodgame Fashion (2011)
- Goodgame Hercules (2011)
- Goodgame Galaxy (2012)
- Shadow Kings (2014)
- Empire: Millennium Wars (2018)
- Big Company: SkyTopia (2018)
- Empire: Age of Knights (2019)
- Big Farm: Home & Garden (2021)

== Goodgame Empire ==
Goodgame Empire is a free-to-play medieval castle-building strategy game launched in 2011. Players will build a castle and use troops to attack both computer-controlled and player enemies; they can join alliances, complete quests and take part in events. Goodgame Empire is available for web browser; Empire: Four Kingdoms is available for Android and iOS. In the game, there are three main resource types. These three are food, wood, and stone. Besides those there are coins and rubies. There are also other materials, such as mead, beef or honey.

The four kingdoms in the game's name are the Great Empire, the Everwinter Glacier, the Burning Sands and the Fire Peaks. The Great Empire is the main one, where the players build their first castle; as they reach higher levels, they can build a castle for each of the three other kingdoms, in which they can also produce special resources: coal in the Everwinter Glacier, oil in the Burning Sands and glass in the Fire Peaks. Besides the four main castles, players can have up to three outposts in the Great Empire, which are other castles that specialize in the production of particular resources.

Players also choose and collect commanders and are able to equip them with armor and weapons. The game's lifetime revenue crossed $800 million in August 2017.

== Goodgame Big Farm ==
Goodgame Big Farm is a free-to-play farming simulator. Players build up farms, producing and selling products. There are different farms to be unlocked as the player achieves higher levels, and the player can then participate in various activities that last from 3 days to 30 days. Players can also join a cooperative and play with their teammates in their cooperative.

== Goodgame Gangster ==
Goodgame Gangster was a free-to-play RPG game, where players advance through levels and rankings in the leader board. Players collect items and weapons, complete quests and fight enemies and other players. It was called Goodgame Mafia from 2010 to 2012.
