= Time of Defiance =

2002 video game

- European cover art
- Developer: Nicely Crafted Entertainment
- Publishers: EU: Oxygen Games; NA: Strategy First
- Platform: Windows
- Release: WW: August 21, 2002; EU: November 21, 2003; NA: October 7, 2004
- Genre: Massively multiplayer online real-time strategy
- Mode: Multiplayer

Time of Defiance was a massively multiplayer online real-time strategy (MMORTS), featuring floating islands on a planet called Nespanona. Players capture and extract resources from these floating islands. Because the game runs in real-time, the game world continues to alter when players are logged out. All in-game enemies consist of other players, who must be repelled by force or prevented from attacking through diplomatic intervention. It was made free to play on August 19, 2009 and was closed down on July 28, 2010.

== Setting ==
Time of Defiance is set on a world called Nespanona, which one million years ago had a race called the Nespans living on it. The Nespans understood that all physics was just a side effect of actions at the quantum level, and using this knowledge were able to do many things that would seem impossible. They were interested in interstellar travel. They could already teleport objects but only relatively small objects, such as people. A scientist attempted to teleport larger objects to use on starships, however, a mathematical mistake caused him to begin the process of shrinking the entire planet's core. Although this would take years to complete, the effects on the planet's gravity would be fairly extreme, causing the planet's crust to fracture and fall. Faced with the situation, the Nespan attached thousands of anti-gravity engines to the underside of the crust, giving them time to evacuate the entire planet. As the crust began to collapse, the anti-gravity engines held parts of the crust in place creating islands floating above the ocean created by the watery moon being sucked into the core.

Currently the remaining people haven't got the level of technology that the Nespan have, the most advanced being Quantam Foam Gates, relics of the Nespan. The Quantam Gates are controlled by the Eighth House, a neutral organization that acts like a marketplace selling rare ships and resources in exchange for the Crystal Moss. The Eighth House is engaged in a war with the Shadoo, and seems to encourage the Cog tribes to fight over the Northern Continent.

=== Races ===
The Cog are a clannish race with moderately primitive technology. Each individual Cog is a member of a specific clan, and the clans are dominated by the Eighth House. An Example of Cog technology is that all their ships run on coal as a fuel. The Cog are engaged in a war with the Shadoo, but it is war only fought by the Eighth House and few other Cog have even seen a real Shadoo.

The Shadoo are a more technologically advanced race than the Cog. They are a more philosophical race than the energetic Cog, and their architecture reflects this. In the game the only way to acquire their ships is through transactions with the Eighth House, as no Shadoo are encountered in the game. There is little evidence to suggest the Shadoo appearing in the game in person as they have only been represented by their looted ships.

The Nespan are even less encountered than the Shadoo, with only two of their units in the game. They seem to disturb the Eighth House, as the ships that are found do not resemble the relics they had expected. They were constructed recently, and are purchasable through the Eighth House or found scattered across the continent.

== Gameplay ==
The objective of the game is to colonise as many islands as possible, to mine their resources - coal, stone, metal etc. These islands are scattered within a huge arena. Once gathered these resources enable players to build more assets. Meanwhile, other players are doing the same thing, which can lead to alliances or enemies. The game seems to require total commitment of its players if they hope to make headway.

== Reception ==
Reception

Aggregate score
Aggregator	Score
Metacritic	73/100

Review scores
Publication	Score
Computer Gaming World	3/5
GameSpot	7/10
GameZone	8.1/10
IGN	8.3/10
PC Format	75%
PC Gamer (UK)	80% (2003); 71% (2002)
PC Gamer (US)	62%
PC Zone	52%
X-Play	2/5

At the time of release, the game received "average" reviews according to the review aggregation website Metacritic.
