= Imperium Galactic War =

2013 video game

- Developers: Vavel Games; Kabam (formerly)
- Publishers: Vavel Games; Kabam (formerly)
- Directors: Mike Wallis; Chris Bernert; John Balestrieri; Mikołaj Marcisz
- Writer: John Karnay
- Platforms: Browser, Microsoft Windows, macOS
- Release: February 16, 2013
- Genre: Massively multiplayer online real-time strategy
- Mode: Multiplayer

Imperium Galactic War (abbreviated IGW) is a massively multiplayer online real-time strategy game by Vavel Games, originally developed and published by Kabam in 2013. The game runs on a freemium model, and is supported through the use of microtransactions.

The premise of the game is simple; players begin by picking which faction they would like to be a part of. There are three factions. The Tyrannar Empire, The Sovereignty, and The Intergalactic Alliance. Whichever decision the player makes, will ultimately effect the way the rest of their game-play looks, feels, and functions. Each player has their own starbase, and fleets they have to upgrade in order to defend themselves from other players, or even attack other players and non-player characters (NPCs). Players can earn experience points and level up by upgrading their fleets and starbase, completing game missions, and engaging in live combat with other players and NPCs.

== Development ==
Original directors, developers, and producers included Mike Wallis, who has worked on titles such as Eve Online, and Chris Bernert, whose titles include games like The Lord of the Rings Online, and Dungeons & Dragons Online. Current directors, developers, and producers include John Balestrieri, who oversaw the original game's development, and is an adviser to international gaming and media companies around the world, and Mikołaj Marcisz. Marcisz is the co-founder of Vavel, and is the adviser to a number of gaming companies, he graduated from the Warsaw School of Film Video Game Development Course.

=== Shutdown and revival ===
The original iteration of the game shut down as of November 4, 2013, within the same year it started. This occurred due to layoffs at the game's original company, Kabam.

On March 31, 2017, Imperium Galactic War was acquired by Vavel Games from AfterShock (formerly Kabam). Vavel's CEO John Balestrieri had been the Tech Director on the project. The game is being developed in order to bring it back to the online, and eventually PC base.
