= Imperia Online =

2005 video game

- Developer: Imperia Online JSC
- Publisher: Imperia Online JSC
- Producers: Dobroslav Dimitrov, Moni Dochev
- Platforms: Microsoft Windows, Android, Web browser, Windows Phone, SteamOS, iOS
- Release: 23 August 2005: Web browser; WW: 23 August 2005 Microsoft Windows; NA: 23 August 2005; EU: 23 August 2005 iOS; NA: 12 April 2012; EU: 12 April 2012 Android; NA: 15 February 2014; EU: 15 February 2014; CHN: TBA 2016 Fire OS; WW: 7 April 2015
- Genre: MMORTS

Imperia Online is a persistent, browser-based, massively multiplayer, online real-time strategy game developed by the Bulgarian game production company Imperia Online JSC. It was originally released on 23 August 2005.

Set in a medieval world, Imperia Online is a predominantly militaristic strategy game. Imperia Online has been translated into 30 languages and has over 40 million registered users. The game is currently in its seventh version, but there are still active previous realms (such as Version 5).

== Gameplay ==
Imperia Online is set in the Medieval times. The current version is 7, although there are still active version 5 realms as well. Each player starts the game as the emperor of an undeveloped Province. The Province can be developed by constructing - and later upgrading – various economic and military buildings amongst which resource-generating buildings as well as universities, used for researching key technologies. Recruiting and training military units allows players to attack other Provinces to plunder their resources, and defend from enemy attacks. Players may trade their resources with other players after they've built a marketplace on their own territory. The Province grows into an empire through territory annexing and colonizing. Players can communicate with each other using in-game messages, and may join alliances for military and economic co-operation with other players.

=== Resources ===
Resources are needed for developing Provinces and training units. Three of them – Wood, Iron and Stone – are produced by resource-generating buildings: Lumber mill, Iron mine and Stone quarry. The resource output can be increased by upgrading the three resource-generating structures, so that new work vacancies are created and, thus, the possibility for increased production. The fourth main resource is Gold. It is used for almost any type of research, military training and building development. It is also the universal currency for buying and selling all three other types of resources. Gold is gathered through taxes, selling resources on the Marketplace, fortress sieges, deposit interests, and as one of the possible rewards from the various caskets awarded in the game. There are also the so-called 'Special resources' that can be found throughout the realm. There are more than 50 types of special resources and their main purpose is granting bonuses to various in-game statistics like resource production, military units, experience gain, etc.

=== Buildings ===
There are 29 structures that can be built and upgraded in the capital. Buildings are constructed and upgraded through a main building, called Town hall. The Town hall is the building every player starts the game with. The two main types of buildings are separated in tabs 'Economy' and 'Military'. Each building has a special function. For example, the two universities that make possible the development of Military and Economic technologies.

=== Provinces ===
Each Province starts as a single village that the player takes control of. Through building, research and battle progression the Province grows on the Global map, later annexing territories that turn into provinces of the original one, known as a Capital by that time. The development of the provinces is similar to what the player has gone through with the capital – buildings have to be built and upgraded, the population has to be predisposed to growing and kept happy and the resources and military units can be used by the entire Province. There are some disadvantages that provinces have compared to the Capital: universities for example can't be constructed on Province territory, same goes for the Palace, Headquarters, Gubernatorial headquarters, Bank, Wonders and so on. Colonization is one of the ways to expand your Empire's territory on the Global map.

=== Alliances ===
The Alliances in Imperia Online are groups of players sharing their own strategy with each other. Alliance members donate resources into the alliance treasury, which are used for researching technologies, waging wars, building alliance holdings, cultural and military influence expansion, etc. Allies can support each other in an economic and military way via gold transfer module. Alliances are ranked in a separate ranking based thoroughly on the total sum of all members’ net worth points.

=== Battles ===
Imperia Online's battle system is rich and complex, despite being built with five main types of military units only. The five main categories of units are Swordsmen, Spearmen, Archers, Cavalry and Siege Engines. The battle system requires skill, tactical thinking and the usage of the correct battle formation, as each battle's outcome is determined automatically upon the impact and the armies cannot be controlled directly. There are three types of attacks: Field Battle, Fortress Siege and Pillage. The first one sends the troops to fight only with the opponent's field army, without sieging the Fortress or pillaging the civil population. The only profit for the attacker are military points for slashing enemy units and honor points. Fortress siege is conducted after a successful Field battle for the attacker. A successful Fortress siege loots resources. If the player chooses Pillage, their troops engage the opponent's civil population. Gold is earned for every killed villager. It's punished with Honor drop.

=== The Great People ===
The Great People feature was introduced with the eponymous Version 6 of the game. It added the concept of Noblemen – the Emperor and his court, which can gain experience and level up in two distinct disciplines. The Governor skills generally boost the resource and troop production in a province, while General skills improve your battle capabilities. Furthermore, each of the Great People comes with their own inborn talents, and a careful selection of one's Emperor's hereditary line allows you to always keep the crown in the hands of the most suitable people. In 2018, dungeons were introduced in the game. If a battle is lost by the player there is a chance their general to be captured by the opposite army.

=== Winning the Realm ===
Since the start of the version 5 of the game the winner of the Realm was determined by the Alliance competition. During that competition the alliances were trying to conquer the castles and control the influence these castles were projecting. At least 60% influence of the entire Global map territory for a set number of hours (depending on the speed of the Realm) were required, so a victory could be secured. After the Alliance winner in the competition had been determined, the era was finished.

As of 2016 all the eras in all realms of Imperia Online finish on a fixed date, announced in front by the game system. The winner of the Realm is the Alliance that has the highest percentage of influence up to that final date or the highest allied net worth points value, if no one has influence.

=== Global Events ===
The Global Events are epic challenges which Imperia Online offers to its players. The colossal structures have appeared for the first time in Version 6 and require an enormous amount of skill to be defeated. The Dark Fortress, The Skull of Wonders, The Tower of Knowledge and The Eternal Castle are just part of the events, which unite entire realms to conquer them.

=== Hall of Fame ===
In 2018, a "Hall of Fame" was introduced. The feature contains the history of all eras in all realms of Imperia Online in the last decades. Each visitor of the main page is able to browse the game's entire history and see who were the top performing players and alliances even for a specific realm.

== Development ==
In January 2005, the idea for the game is conceived by Dobroslav Dimitrov, who is responsible for the game design, and Moni Dochev, responsible for the coding on the project.

On August 23, Imperia Online's Realm 1 goes live.

In 2006, Version 2 and Version 3 realms launched simultaneously, running parallel with V1 and offering alternative rules and gameplay to cater to different player tastes. The game was translated in 12 languages, not in small part thanks to the efforts of Community Managers appointed from among the Imperia Online player ranks. The first Imperia Online tournament is held.

In 2008, another upgrade is launched: Version 4, which serves as a prototype of Version 5. With even more complex and enriched gameplay, V4 would also later receive a significant visual upgrade, dubbed Version 4A. The same year, in the V4 realms, the very first of the emblematic Nomad Invasions tournaments is introduced.

In 2010, Version 5, Age of Conquest, is launched. It introduces new visuals and features, chief amongst them – the addition of a second playable race, the Nomads.

In 2011, the Nomad Invasions tournament, with customized rules, comes to the Age of Conquest realms. Also, for the first time the Imperia Online World Cup is held.

In 2012, the first Tactical Realm and Mega Blitz realms are implemented, offering an additional challenge for experienced players. Imperia Online V5 launches on iOS. Imperia Online World Cup 2012 is held.

In 2013, Imperia Online is integrated in the largest Russian social network, Odnoklassniki. The last IO World Cup based on Version 5 is held. Version 5 is integrated in my.mail.ru and launches on Android.

That same year Version 6, The Great People is launched, with complete graphics and usability overhaul, extended and improved mechanics, and new features, chief amongst them – the addition of the eponymous Great People.

In 2014, V6 launches on iOS and Android, and is also integrated with Facebook. That same year the game is available on portals such as Yahoo, ProSieben, WildTangent, Grupa Onet and RBK Gаmes. Imperia Online improves the partnership with Mail Ru Group by integrating Version 6 in Odnoklassniki, my.mail.ru and Vkontakte.

In 2015, Imperia Online for Windows Phone is published by Game Troopers and featured Xbox title by Microsoft. The game offers new epic challenges with its new Global Events such as The Dark Fortress and The Skull of Wonders. 10th Anniversary of the classical Imperia Online tournament "Nomads Invasions" is held. For the first time, the game has winter outlook at the end of the year.

In 2016, a new feature - the Imperial Shop is introduced, where various goods like Experience Boosters, Civil and Military Buildings and Research Time Reduction, Army Strength Upgrades and other exclusive offers can be found. The most challenging Blitz Masters Realm with a ruleset that makes the gameplay extremely competitive is implemented. That same year, Imperia Online is greenlit by the world's largest online platform Steam. Also, the first Imperia Online Olympic Tournament - Summer Games 2016 is held.

In 2017, Imperia Online is published by Play 3arabi under the name of Kingdoms Online, available on both iOS and Android, fully localized in Arabic and with culturally customized content, including game soundtrack and art. That same year, Imperia Online integrates ClanPlay - a messaging app, that allows players to communicate, plan their strategies, recruit newcomers, engage in diplomacy with other clans, and share their accomplishments. Also, the first Imperia Online Olympic Tournament - Winter Games 2017 is held.

At the beginning of 2018, Imperia Online is launched on Samsung Galaxy App Store and MI App store. Later the same year the game debuts on Huawei AppGallery, KakaoTalk and One Store. Also, the game is officially presented at Huawei Connect Europe as one of the leading strategies available on the store.

During the same year Imperia Online participates at the War Child charity event together with other leading mobile game developers. For the Armistice event a special premium package is released in the game while all the revenue from it is donated to support children affected by war.

At the beginning of 2019 the “Global chat” is released in all realms- a feature which improves the social element of the game and enables the players to communicate simultaneously at one place. After that Imperia Online hosted Nomads Invasion: Civil War, where the players were able to fight the Nomad Horde and to turn against each other as well. Later this year, the first Battle Royale tournament in Imperia Online was launched - a complete solo PvP tournament. The game also debuted in LootBoy, BILD and Wanted 5 Games. At the same time Imperia Online was listed on the gaming portal of Kixeye - the developer of War Commander and Battle Pirates. After these events, Imperia Online participated once more in the global cause of War Child - special in-game packages were developed and launched. All 100% of the sold packages were donated directly to War Child Armistice.

In autumn, The World Cup took place and the champion is Romania. Moreover, in the 10th year anniversary version of the game, some of the influential Bulgarian gaming YouTubers led elite alliances in the so called “Influencer wars” realm and guided their followers in their quest for victory. The first tournament held within the game in 2020 was the annual Imperia Online Winter Game Tournament, where, unlike the last two years, the title was taken by RoyalSquad. In May of the same year, the Imperia Online’s World Cup took place under the motto “The World Under Siege”, with more than 30 teams involved.

At the end of the summer, the Summer Games Tournament took place, where many long-time teams in the game joined to fight - Mercenarios, DeathSquad, ForceAwakens & OldFriends. With the start of autumn, Imperia Online celebrated the 10th anniversary of the World Cup Tournament, for which special in-game events and tournaments were created. This is the first time the World Cup Tournament was held two times in one year. The winner for the second year in a row is Romania. During 2020 the Discord channel of the game was created.

2021 started with the tournament “Realm of legends” and the title was taken by the team sorin3o, followed by the annual Winter Games Tournament won by DeathSquad. Two new modules - Resource Camps and Alliance Items, were added, available to all Realms after the restart of each one. The Nomads Invasion Tournament launched in March, followed by the fourth edition of Dominion Rush in May where 29 teams participated. Тhe tournament “Eternal War” started in June with the title being taken by team of the Russian_Empire. July marked the launch of the new edition of the individual tournament in "Battle Royale" format - Imperia Online Battle Royale which is the hardest solo PvP environment ever created! August marked the 5th Anniversary of the Summer Games, while in September 2021 the 10th anniversary of the World Cup was marked and won by the Romanian team for a record 3rd time in a row.

The Winter Games was the first tournament for 2022 followed up by Eternal War. Followed up by being featured on Windows Store twice and Samsung Store after. Meanwhile a profile redesign has been introduced. A variety of events and tournaments were held throughout the year, including St. Patrick's which was launched in March, several Easter events were launched in April including Eastern protection during the holidays. Same month the Nomads Invasion was launched. In Imperia Online there were new military research opportunities added. The Dominion Rush tournament was launched in May. In 2022 a Parallel realm was launched for Imperia Online as a new feature. In July the Summer games were released. The Hall of Fame had new charts, global profiles and statistics, and included achievements.

Imperia Online's tournament schedule for 2023 commenced with The Winter Games in January. This was followed by Dominion Rush, which took place in May. As the seasons changed, the Summer Games marked the end of June. An important event was the return of The World of Legends tournament, which resumed after a two-year hiatus, at the end of July. This was succeeded by the introduction of a new tournament called the Game of Tribes in August. Game of Tribes featured a format, where competitors were divided into four tribes–Vikings, Knights, Samurai, and Huns. Each tribe was designated its own quadrant on the game’s global map, and participants were permitted to form alliances only with players from their respective tribes. Later in the year, as usual, the World Cup 2023 - “Age of Heroes” tournament took place, with Romania emerging as the winner.

In 2024, the tournament season began with the Winter Games, followed by Heroic Rush, the seventh entry in the Dominion Rush series. The Easter Egg Hunt provided a fun seasonal event, while the Eternal Glory tournament offered further challenges. The second Game of Tribes edition let players navigate alliances in tribal quadrants. The Summer Games brought a lively conclusion to the season. The Realm of Legends continued to attract participants worldwide. The year concluded with the World Cup – Heroes' Legacy, where the German team claimed victory.

== Tournaments ==
Imperia Online holds various tournaments. So far there have been 8 types of tournaments: Nomad Invasions, Champions League, Castle Conquest, Dominion Rush, Imperial Olympics - Summer and Winter Games and World Cup. In 2017, the "Territorial Competition" tournament was held for the first time.In 2018 the first premium tournament was hosted - Nomad All Stars had a price fund of 5000 Euro.

Former winners have included:

Year	World Champion
2011	Bulgarian team
2012	Bulgarian team
2013	Croatian team
2014	Brazilian team
2015	Croatian team
2016	Polish team
2017	Bulgarian team
2018	USA team
2019	Romanian team
2020	Romanian team
2021	Romanian team
2022	North Macedonia team
2023	Romanian team
2024	German team

== Nominations ==
“Game Connection Awards 2014” Paris, France:

- Promising IP
- Desktop Downloadable
- Hardcore Game

„TIGA Games Industry Awards 2016“

- Nominee for TIGA's Game of the Year Award

Amazon.de Hot New Releases: The best-selling new and future releases in Soundtrack 2016

- Imperia Online Soundtracks holding #10 and #11 positions

“European Business Awards 2016/17”

- National Champion in the Customer Focus Category

„TIGA Games Industry Awards 2017“

- Nominee for TIGA's Strategy Game
