= FateLords =

2002 browser-based video game

- Inventor: Zygimantas Berziunas
- Inception: 2002
- Manufacturer: Dokeda
- Last production year: 2008
- Website: http://www.fatelords.com

FateLords was one of the first browser based on massively multiplayer online, real-time strategy video games. It was played for 6 years since 2002, until officially closed in June 2008. During that time, it won a Golden Web Awards (2002, 2003, 2004), a Canadian Web award (2002), GameSpotter award, KTU Technorama and it was announced as the best Lithuanian product of information and communications technology in 2002. The game was created by Zygimantas Berziunas and later sold for Dokeda company, which supported the game until the year of 2008. Shortly after the official close of the game, the domain name fatelords.com has been dropped and purchased by a third party. Dokeda has no plans to continue hosting the game in future. SkyLords, a subsequent game by the same developer is still available online.

The game had many players from Lithuania, the Netherlands, the UK and the United States, as well as other countries.

Rules

The game was played in a round base system which lasted from the start of the month till the end. In this time players had numerous methods to gain points such as capturing enemy planets and destroying enemy ships. Planets with higher defenses were worth more points depending on the defense. Planets with no defense were only worth 10 points and were mostly captured out of spite. At the end of the round there would be a top 25 placement system and the player who earned the most points were ranked top.

Staff

Gato was the last admin of FateLords and made very few enhancements to the game. The last one being the addition of the Power I-Trader which could instantly transport small ships anywhere in the game for a fairly high resource fee. He had a planetary system located in deep space, a very vast and nearly endless section of the FateLords universe. This is a system that was only known to few veteran players. Towards the end of the games life the system was discovered by Mikdugal1 an ex-veteran who was long retired. He contacted Inubis another ex-veteran who rounded up his own "Clan" (AEF)and launched the final massive attack the game has ever seen. The planets were guarded by unreleased nearly invincible battle cruisers and after days of relentless attacks they managed to destroy one.

Clans

The debate over the best clan in FateLords continues, but several notable ones stand out. DUF (Dutch United Forces) and Darkside are two of the longest-running veteran clans consistently in the top 5. LoS (Lord of Shadows) is another veteran clan known for their skill but primarily operated as a support clan. AEF (American Elite Forces) was the first successful faction of American players and the first alliance to take both first and second place from Darkside in several years.
