= ComiConverse =

Internet entertainment news site

- Website type: Comic books, television, film, video games
- Website: comiconverse.com
- Commercial: Yes
- Launched: January 2015
- Current status: Active

ComiConverse is an Internet News site, focusing on comics, TV, film, and games.

== History ==
The website started in January 2015 as a reliable source in the comics and pop-culture space. ComiConverse hired writers with background in the industry to cover different topics related to their categories.

Over the course of 2 years, the website has been covered and quoted as an authentic source by The Hollywood Reporter, The New York Times, Entrepreneur and Forbes among a number of other major outlets and magazines.

ComiConverse is specifically quoted as a reliable source that holds exclusive interviews of actors such as an interview with Roger Ashton-Griffiths of Game of Thrones quoted by WinterIsComing.net and the interview with Jason O'Mara of Agents of S.H.I.E.L.D.

== Reception ==
ComiConverse, as an engagement website, has been taken as an example by Forbes for its jumping to trends using social media hashtags in order to get better engagement from its viewers.
