= ERepublik =

Multiplayer online game

eRepublik
- Website type: Website, massively multiplayer online game, simulation
- Available in: English, Spanish, Korean, French, German, Portuguese, Ukrainian, Albanian, Arabic, Indonesian, Bulgarian, Portuguese, Chinese, Croatian, Farsi, Greek, Georgian, Hungarian, Italian, Macedonian, Polish, Romanian, Russian, Serbian, Slovenian, Turkish, Belarusian
- Owners: eRepublik Labs; Stillfront Group
- Creators: CEO Alexis Bonte; CTO George Lemnaru
- Revenue: Sale of virtual gold
- Website: www.erepublik.com/en
- Commercial: yes
- Registration: Required
- Launched: 14 October 2008 (beta phase started on 20 November 2007)
- Current status: Online

eRepublik is a free-to-play, web browser-based massively multiplayer online game developed by Romanian studio eRepublik Labs which was launched outside of beta phase on 14 October 2008 and is accessible via the Internet. The game is set in a mirror world (called the New World) where players, referred to as citizens, join in local and national politics where they can help formulate national economic and social policies as well as initiating wars with their neighbours and/or tread the path of a private citizen working, fighting and voting for their state. It was developed by Alexis Bonte and George Lemnaru.

eRepublik is programmed in PHP using Symfony framework and runs in most modern browsers. eRepublik has spawned a number of similar games due to the commercial success.

On 30 May 2017, it was announced that Stillfront Group has acquired eRepublik Labs.

== Funding ==
eRepublik has raised funding in four rounds:

- Seed – February 2007 – 200,000 euros
- Angel – June 2008 – 550,000 euros
- Series A – June 2009 – 2,000,000 euros
- Fall – July 2012 – 500,000 euros

== Overview ==
eRepublik is a global massively multiplayer online game where players can participate in a variety of daily activities. Citizens of the New World can be employees, own businesses, form political parties, vote in elections, become party presidents, members of Congress or country presidents, write newspaper articles and even go to war as citizens of virtual versions of real life countries. The game has very few visual elements and is primarily text-based in nature.

Upon joining, a citizen picks which virtual country he or she wishes to join. Each of these countries is named after an actual country in the real world, and is generally located similarly (warfare may cause certain regional displacements). The citizen then seeks employment at a company within that country, and is allowed the opportunity to train as a soldier for that country. Training, and working at a company is done on a daily basis. One of the main drawing points of the website is that it takes a mere "14 minutes a day" to participate.

eRepublik Gold is a fictional currency used in the eRepublik World. It is the main reference point for all the local virtual currencies (examples: USD, GBP) and it is used to buy additional features (such as companies) within the New World. It can be obtained freely by reaching certain levels or achievements, or purchased with real life currency. Many users have expressed dislike over the changes to the game which requires gold to use.

== Modules ==
=== My Places ===
A citizen has a patch of land where they can construct various buildings, such as farms, mines, factories, storage and training grounds. Those buildings can be used once a day to produce raw materials, finished products, store materials and products, and increase the citizen's strength, a value determining how much damage is done in battles. Buildings can be constructed with local currency or gold, and upgraded with only gold. To upgrade a level 4 factory to level 5 requires 350 gold for example, and 300 gold costs 99.9 euros.

The effectiveness of economy buildings depends on the natural resources that a nation has. There are 20 different natural resources, each boosting production by 20% for the corresponding raw material or product. Duplicate natural resources does not give any bonus, and the map is arranged in a way so that countries with a high amount of natural regions in real life does not have an advantage over countries with fewer regions.

There are four types of products with each one having five types of raw materials that can be used to produce the final products. Those products are food, weapons, aircraft weapons and houses. There are also moving tickets which can only be obtained as reward from the weekly challenge (meaning to fight in the battles) and are used to travel through the regions.

=== Politics Module ===
As simple citizens, players can join a party by reaching a certain level. Once they have joined a party, they can run for party presidency. If they campaign successfully and can convince their party colleagues to choose them over a more established name then they become the leaders of the party and they can choose their party candidates for congress (if party is ranked in the top 5 nationally) or presidency.

On the fifth of every month eRepublik holds presidential elections, on the fifteenth the party presidential elections and on the twenty-fifth the congressional elections. Days before the presidential vote the top five parties will select a person to run for president, and then it is decided by a vote by the populace. For the congress elections, party presidents use a list to declare their candidates. The total number of congress members in each country depends on how many regions that country has at that time. If there is a tie in any election, eRepublik automatically chooses by referring to experience points.

Besides democracy, there's the ability to bring dictatorship. Commanders of military units can declare coup which can be supported by other military units and if it succeeds, the commander of the military unit which started the coup becomes dictator and absorbs every power of president and congress. Along with coup, military units can also initiate revolution if they want to overthrow the dictator and restore democracy.

=== War Module ===
To declare war on other countries, the president or congress of the country proposes a Natural Enemy law. If the vote passes, the two countries are at war and each region is attacked either by order of the president or automatically by the game every 24 hours. In wars, the citizens of the respective countries fight independently, each one fighting a player of the target country whose health varies, after defeating the opponent influence is gained on, which shows the current percentage of influence the countries at war have over that region. Eight to twelve battles, lasting one and a half to two hours long, must be won by either side before the region is declared conquered or secure. The battles will continue until one side has won enough points to win the campaign. There are two types of battles, ground and air battles. Air battles occur every 4th battle.

Wars are potentially essential to the power of a country in eRepublik because they allow citizens of the countries that are a part of the wars to become stronger and obtain higher military ranks, thus enabling them to do more damage in fights. Theoretically a nation that has experienced and battle hardened citizens can become a global power.

In reality the changes to unlimited gold purchasing means that one older and stronger player can conquer any medium-sized nation by continually fighting (tanking) via using their gold to purchase wellness packs. Many of the existing 'empires' of the new world consist of nations that have significant numbers of these types of players.

=== News Module ===
Any citizen can create a newspaper in which they can publish articles. Other citizens can read these articles, vote on them, comment on them or even subscribe to the newspapers of other citizens. Every 1000 subscribers a newspaper gets, the owner receives gold and the "Media Mogul" medal.

The articles can be formatted using BBCode. They can be published in the nation of the citizen and in other nations paying in gold a publishing fee which varies. There are 6 categories in which media are divided into.

=== Gameplay ===
The role play of the New World consists of combining the capabilities of the above modules to reach goals and become leader in one or more domains. Citizens can use newspapers to promote themselves, their companies, parties, or even countries. The congress of a country sets taxes to enforce economic policies. To wage successful wars, the economy of a country has to sustain it and citizens have to be motivated.

=== Other features ===
Functionalities include a Twitter-like shoutbox system. Gold can also be purchased in unlimited amounts. Game developers, noting the use of IRC channels and forums outside of the main eRepublik site, and the importance of social interaction in the game, released a new module, the Chat Module, allowing users to create their own chat rooms, and interact with other citizens while remaining on the main site.

The user-maintained Discord servers, forums and IRC channels, however, remain more popular and this little feature is used by few.

== Community ==
eRepublik, being a massively multiplayer online social game, encourages communication between players, and creates social communities usually organized around nations of the game. Players create IRC/WhatsApp/Telegram chat rooms, forums and Discord servers for each nation, and create fictional entities such as militias, political take overs, as well as discussing social events dealing with players of the game.

== Mobile app ==
On 11 May 2018, it was announced that a mobile app for eRepublik was under development and the closed alpha phase initiated on 16 May for both Android and iOS. During that phase, testers could request access after filling a form and updates occurred once every month.

On 26 November 2018, the open beta phase was announced once again for both Android and iOS. During that phase, everyone could download the app and the updates became more rare, except the first month where they were frequent.

Some features:

- Graphical presentation in one page of all main places of eRepublik (media, marketplace, job market, storage, travel, work, training grounds, feeds).
- Work, train and fight with few taps.
- Autofight in battles after setting the amount of energy usage and deploying on the battlefield.

== Awards ==
- 12 December 2007 – LeWeb3 2007 The honorable mention company
- 9 October 2008 – The Future of Web Apps conference winner
