= Evony =

2009 video game

- Evony's logo
- Developers: Evony, LLC
- Publishers: Evony, LLC
- Release: May 6, 2009; 17 years ago
- Genre: Massively multiplayer online real-time strategy game
- Mode: Multiplayer

Evony (formerly known as Civony) is a multiplayer online game by American developer Evony LLC, set in the European medieval period. Two browser-based versions (Age 1 and Age 2) and a mobile version (The King's Return) exist. The game became notorious for its original ad campaign, which featured scantily clad women (including models from pornographic film covers) that had nothing to do with the game itself.

== Gameplay ==
The gameplay of Evony.

Evony is set in a persistent world during the medieval period. The player assumes the role of a lord or lady of a city or alliance. New players are granted "beginner's protection," which prevents other players from attacking their cities for seven days or until they upgrade the town hall to level five or higher. This lets new players accumulate resources and troops and accustom themselves to the game before other players can attack them.

The player sets tax rate, production, and construction. Resources include gold, food, lumber, stone, iron, and the city's idle population. As with similar games, the player first must increase the city's population and hourly resource production rates and construct certain buildings in the city, and then start building resource fields and an army. An army can include siege machines, such as ballistas, catapults, and battering rams, and foot troops, such as archers, warriors and swordsmen.

All items must be acquired with gems, which can be purchased with real money through its item shop in game or won at the wheel. Some items accelerate the player's progress through the game. Winning items in battle is the primary way to acquire resources and cities.

=== Interaction ===
The game features player-versus-player game play, rendering it almost impossible for players who have not formed or joined alliances to survive.

The game allows the player to control up to ten cities through gain of titles. To gain a title, a certain rank is necessary. Both Title and Rank require Medals gained by use of in-game coins to purchase medal boxes, by attacking valleys or winning medal boxes from spinning the wheel.

The game has two monetary systems. The in-game monetary system revolves around gold. Gold can be obtained by completing quests, by taxing the city's population, or by attacking NPCs. One can sell resources for gold on the marketplace or trade resources with others within one's alliance for gold. One can also use real money to buy game cents with which to purchase items and resources from the in-game shop.

== Reception ==
In a three-star review for Stuff, Joel Lauterbach wrote, "Evony has done an amazing job at making the game look and feel appealing to all gamers, however once a player scratches the surface and sees the investment-heavy time-killing game mechanics, many are likely to be put off."

=== Controversy ===
An Evony advertisement on a music streaming service

The Guardian noted that Evony's 2009 ad campaign featured women, increasingly unclothed, which had no connection to the game. In 2009, Gavin Mannion wrote that Evony's "latest ad is seriously pushing boundaries of what is acceptable to publish on Google". Other ads used stock photographs from pornographic DVD covers and promoted the game via "millions of spam comments". The company denied responsibility. That same year, Evony's lawyers sent a cease-and-desist letter to blogger Bruce Everiss after he alleged deceptive marketing but withdrew their claims two days into the case.

In April 2024, Evony's advertising attracted controversy again when the British Advertising Standards Authority ruled that a number of the game's online ads were misleading. The ads showed apparent gameplay involving shooting barrels rolling towards the player, or solving puzzles. While the game does contain minigames similar to those advertised, the ASA concluded that they did not represent the core of the game and therefore breached UK advertising codes.

Those Games is based on fake mobile minigames like those from Evony ads.
