= Solid Clouds =

Icelandic video game developer

- Industry: Video games
- Founded: 2013; 13 years ago
- Founder: Stefán Gunnarsson; Stefán Þór Björnsson
- Headquarters: Reykjavík, Iceland
- Number of employees: 15 (2018)

Solid Clouds is an Icelandic video game developer located in Reykjavík. It was founded in 2013 by Stefán Gunnarsson, a graduate in computer science from Reykjavík University, and Stefán Þór Björnsson of Íslandsbanki. Solid Clouds has secured both private and public funding in its foundational years with the largest round in January 2018.

In 2013, Solid Clouds began development on Starborne using the Unity engine. It is a combination of 4X and massively multiplayer online real-time strategy game. Solid Clouds was selected for the Nordic Showcase 2016 at the annual Slush conference. Development of Starborne has received favorable coverage by video game press for its sixth and seventh alpha development rounds.
