= Society (video game) =

- Developer(s): Stardock
- Publisher(s): Stardock
- Director(s): Paul Kerchen
- Platform(s): Microsoft Windows
- Release: NA: TBA
- Genre(s): Massively multiplayer online real-time strategy
- Mode(s): Multiplayer

Society is a massively multiplayer online real-time strategy game in development by Stardock. It is to be initially released on their online distribution service, Impulse for free. First announced in 2005, development progress was slow in the coming years, and by February 2009, the game's development was placed on-hold in favor of wrapping up another of the company's games, Elemental: War of Magic. Upon its release in August 2010, development was restarted in January 2011, though the company has been quiet on the game's status since.

== Gameplay ==
Society plays as a massively multiplayer online real-time strategy. The game starts with the player obtaining a single province, of which 50,000 exist on a single server. From there, the player must build up their province, creating buildings, schools, factories, and other infrastructure necessary for a subset of people to exist. Upon the creation of a successful province, the player must decide on how to interact with all of the other provinces, many of which are other player's provinces, whether it be forcefully taking them over through war, or using diplomacy to forge cooperation between provinces. The game's world exists in a continual 24-hour world that never stops; progress in the game continues even when the player is away. Artificial intelligence will take over and defend a province when the player is not present. To avoid having players return to the game with their empire entirely destroyed, only 1/4 of a player's provinces may be contested during any one day, and players can band together into empires to take over the defence of each other's provinces, fighting on one another's behalf.

== Development ==
The game was first announced by Stardock in May 2005, with the company featuring the game as an upcoming title the next month at E3 2005 as well. There, Stardock stated that, while there was no firm release date, they loosely were shooting for a timetable that included an alpha release by the end of the year, a lengthy World of Warcraft-like beta release by late 2006, and a likely release in 2007. Development was announced to be led by Paul Kerchen, who had previously worked for Maxis on Simcity 3000 and Simsville. The game was also announced to be free to play, a concept that was much more rare in 2005, before the boom of mobile gaming.

Development on the game proved to be difficult and slow in the following years. The team worked on the game throughout 2005 and early 2006, with the goal of having footage to be shown by June 2006 at E3 2006. Unfortunately, the team missed this goal, with progress slowing further as the development team was understaffed, and working on wrapping up production on Galactic Civilizations II and its subsequent expansion packs. Stardock was quiet about the project until 2009, where the company stated they would refocus their development on the game after they shipped their next title Elemental: War of Magic. After said game's release in 2010, in February 2011, Stardock announced that Society was experiencing funding issues, but that the company was searching for ways to address the problem through the expanding of their business units and finding partners to work on it as well.
