= Kixeye =

Video game company

- Type: Subsidiary
- Industry: Video games
- Genre: Massively multiplayer online real-time strategy games (MMORTS)
- Founded: July 2007
- Founder: Paul Preece; David Scott; Will Harbin
- Headquarters: Victoria BC, Canada
- Key people: Colin How; (CEO); Tim Holland; (CFO); Ben Cann; (EP; Head of Marketing, CS, Community, Art, Product); Alan Freemantle; (EP; Head of Design, QA); Peter Henry; (EP); Dan Hayhurst; (EP; Head of Analytics, Product); Neil Petrick; (Technical Director); Jeff Platt; (GM of VN Office)
- Products: War Commander, Battle Pirates, Vega Conflict, War Commander: Rogue Assault, Backyard Monsters, Desktop Defender, Tome, Rise of Firstborn
- Number of employees: 50
- Parent: Stillfront Group
- Website: kixeye.com

Kixeye (stylized as KIXEYE, formerly known as Casual Collective) is a video game company founded in July 2007 and headquartered in Victoria, British Columbia, Canada. The company creates, develops and publishes massively multiplayer online real-time strategy games (MMORTS) for PC and mobile devices. Kixeye gained popularity as a pioneer in midcore action games featuring real-time combat on the social networking website Facebook. Following their initial launch, Kixeye's games generated twenty times more revenue per daily active user than other social games, retaining active users five times longer on average.

Titles include Rogue Assault, Battle Pirates, War Commander, and Rise of Firstborn.

== History ==
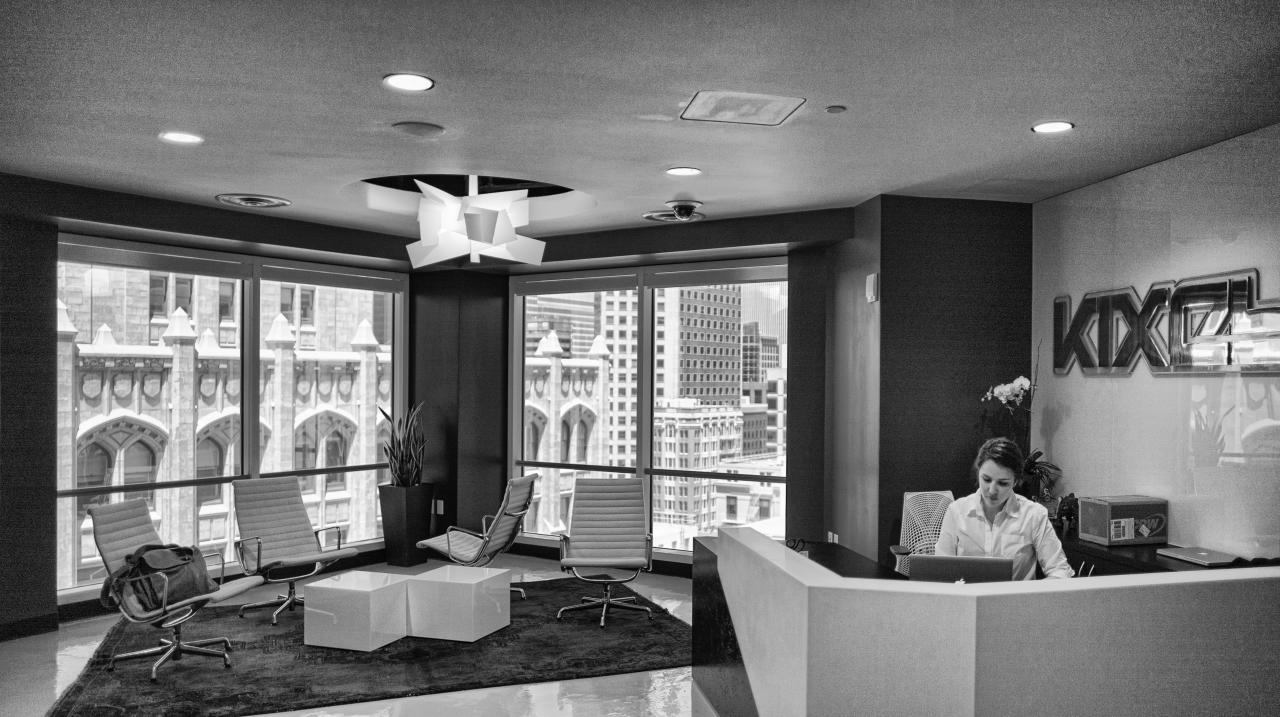
Kixeye office reception in 2012

=== Beginnings ===
Developers David Scott and Paul Preece founded Kixeye as Casual Collective in Berkshire, England to "make games that we grew up playing and that we love playing." They initially started by developing thirteen Flash games.

In mid-2009 when searching for new venues for their strategy games, Scott and Preece decided to move their Flash knowledge to Facebook. After developing Minions on Ice and TSG: Missions as Casual Collective, they hired Will Harbin (co-founder of Affinity Labs) as CEO and moved the company's headquarters to San Francisco from Berkshire, England. They developed Desktop Tower Defense, a tower defense game for Facebook. After its release in December 2009, the game reached 675,000 monthly active users and produced more revenue in one day than their previous games made in one month.

In 2010, Casual Collective released Backyard Monsters. After three months, it had 500,000 monthly active users, and by July 2010, it had 4.5 million monthly active users. The game reached 2.5 million active users per month, 580,000 active users per day, with a 23 percent retention rate. An average play session lasted greater than 30 minutes, players averaged between three and four sessions a day, and retention was over seven months. The game earned a rating of 4.5 out of 5 stars, with over 500,000 votes. Gamezebo gave Backyard Monsters 4.5 out of 5 stars, and said, "To release a game of this calibre for free on Facebook is a real achievement." Backyard Monsters won the Mochi Award for Best Social Game of 2010.

=== 2011-2014 ===
After a company name rebrand in late April 2011, Kixeye launched War Commander and Battle Pirates on the Facebook Games platform. These games stood as the only midcore action games with real-time combat at the time. Both games grew immensely, with a majority of users joining organically in a six-month window between 2012 and 2013.

In 2011, VentureBeat stated that Kixeye's game War Commander "Represents a big step forward in the evolution of Facebook games." Facebook banner ads continue to draw in new players.

In 2012, the company sparked a small controversy after they released a video advertising for programmers that an article interpreted as sexist, and which the article argued represented a common problem of sexism in tech industries. A response from their female vice president of engineering stated that the video was misinterpreted by the journalist, and was not intended as sexist.

Later that year, Kixeye took action against racism by laying off employees reported for misconduct, following a former contractor post on Tumblr.

In 2013, Vega Conflict, a spiritual successor to Battle Pirates set in space, launched on Flash but was quickly rebuilt in Unity. The game became Kixeye's first cross-platform title, with players able to play on mobile, Steam, and browser. It was recently announced on Vega Conflict's Discord that the game will be coming to an end on May 15th 2026

=== 2015-present ===
In 2016, Kixeye launched mobile game War Commander: Rogue Assault, the prequel to War Commander.

In 2019, Kixeye headquarters moved from the San Francisco office (now closed) to the Victoria, British Columbia office, and Clayton Stark was appointed CEO.

On June 3, 2019, Kixeye was acquired by the Stillfront Group for US$90 million.

== List of games ==
As Kixeye (April 2011- onward):

Battle Pirates

Released in May 2011, Battle Pirates is a real-time strategy game.

In the year 2067, a terrorist-sparked world war has wiped out 95% of life on Earth. Survivors are split into five factions that engage in bloody battle on the high seas.

War Commander

War Commander is an MMORTS that entered exclusive beta access to IGN readers on September 1, 2011, and soon after in open public beta on September 13, 2011. The game is set in a post-apocalyptic landscape thirty years after civilization and governments have collapsed. In the game, people are divided into small, warring factions fighting for control of Earth's remaining natural resources.

War Commander: Rogue Assault

War Commander: Rogue Assault is a mobile-based massively multiplayer online real-time strategy game. It takes place in a hypothetical post-apocalyptic World War III era. Players build and train their armies in an effort to take control of the remaining world with the help of their alliance.

War Commander: Rogue Assault was released in December 2016 and developed with the help of Command & Conquer creator Louis Castle. War Commander: Rogue Assault is a free-to-play game available on both iOS and Android platforms.

Siege: Apocalypse

Siege Apocalypse is a free-to-play real-time strategy video game. It is a prequel to War Commander: Rogue Assault. Players engage in PVP battles with the objective to destroy the opponent's base. Players can earn and deploy units and tactics via collectible cards.

Siege: Apocalypse was released in January 2022 and is available on iOS and Android platforms.

Rise of Firstborn

Rise of Firstborn is a free-to-play 4X strategy mobile game originally developed by Netmarble and published by Kixeye in 2021. The game was previously known as Iron Throne. Players collect heroes and build a kingdom where they can ally with other players in world PVP.

=== Discontinued games ===
Kixeye has developed multiple titles in its time that either made it to live and have since been shelved. This list includes the original tower defense game, Desktop Defender; a browser-based MOBA called Tome: Immortal Arena; and the game Backyard Monsters, which inspired much of the base-building RTS genre that followed. Most recently, Vega Conflict joined this list.

Backyard Monsters

Development of Backyard Monsters started in 2009, but the game was not released until January 2010 as Desktop Creatures before being renamed by fan vote to Backyard Monsters. Backyard Monsters was released as a real-time strategy game on Facebook with "destruction and gore and mayhem", unlike other Facebook games at the time. In Backyard Monsters, players build a yard for their monsters, designed so that essential buildings are protected by defensive towers. If the player's yard is designed correctly, the defenses stop invading monsters who try to damage the buildings and loot resources. Backyard Monsters: Unleashed was a port to iOS released in October 2013.

Executive producer David Scott said he designed the game to "be able to play a [real-time strategy] game in short sessions." An expansion for Backyard Monsters titled Inferno was released in January 2012 and in November 2012 a new world map was released. In addition to this, Backyard Monsters also had outposts in the new world map when the new world map update came.

On February 18, 2013, the Kongregate version of Backyard Monsters was shut down.

Backyard Monsters is no longer supported and player numbers have fallen significantly since its inception shortly after the final Hell-Raisers event held on March 26, 2013. It was closed down at the demise of Flash on December 31, 2020.

Desktop Defender

In Desktop Defender, players defended their desktop from creatures called "creeps." Players deployed defensive turrets to attack anything in range. Each defeated creep rewarded players with coins, which players could use to unlock new towers that shot frost, ink, swarms of missiles and other defenses. Players could also purchase special bonus powers that slowed down enemies, sped up tower guns and caused damage.

Desktop is no longer supported by Kixeye long before the demise of Flash on December 31, 2020.

Minions

Minions briefly entered beta testing and was then fully released on November 18, 2008. The game was discontinued with the demise of Flash on December 21, 2020. The MOBA game was played by two teams of one to six players. In the initial phase of the game each player selected or was randomly assigned one of eight "minions" to play as, each with its own strengths and weaknesses. Two of these minions require the purchase of a "Bonus Pack" to be selected. Settings were customizable, including the number of players, and manual or automatic minion selection.

After minion selection, players advanced with the goal of destroying enemy minions and towers. The field was two dimensional, and scrolled vertically, with the two teams spawning in bases at opposite sides of the map. A team was victorious when it destroyed the tower at the heart of the enemy's base.

Tome: Immortal Arena

Tome: Immortal Arena was a Multiplayer online battle arena. Development ended February 5, 2015. The game was shut down on May 17, 2015.

Vega Conflict

Vega Conflict was a real-time strategy game launched in August 2013. Originally built in Flash, Vega Conflict was rebuilt in Unity in 2014 and became Kixeye's first cross-platform title. Users would all occupy the same server but could play on browser, on mobile, or via Steam.

The game focused on the Vega Federation, a space empire that subjects miners to harsh working conditions in an attempt to find valuable Blood Amber. The miners begin to rebel, drawing more enemies and allies into the fray. Players sought out blueprints to unlock more powerful ships and weapons, forming the ultimate fleet of spaceships to bring to events or PvP combat.

Vega Conflict is no longer playable following end of support on May 15, 2026.

As Casual Collective with their defunct web portal (2008- early 2011):
Seventeen original Flash games on old Casual Collective's online web portal in 2008 to early 2011.

- Attack of the Buggles (AotB)
- Backyard Monsters
- Battle Pirates (Beta version on old site before company's name change & new site)
- Buggle Connect (Formerly called Buggle in January–November 2008)
- Buggle Stars
- Desktop Armada (Single player title: DA: Missions in January–November 2008)
- Desktop Defender (New version of Desktop Tower Defence)
- Desktop TD Pro (Formerly called MPDTD in January–November 2008 - probably being "Multi Player Desktop Tower Defence")
- Farragomate
- Flash Element TD (Old title in January 2008. Closed before December 2008.)
- Flash Element TD 2 (FETD 2)
- Minions
- Minions on Ice
- Push
- Splitter 2
- The Space Game (TSG)
- TSG: Missions
