= The Secret Society =

2015 book about Cecil Rhodes

The Secret Society: Cecil John Rhodes's Plan for a New World Order
- Author: Robin Brown
- Language: English
- Subject: Cecil Rhodes, New World Order
- Publisher: Penguin Books South Africa
- Publication date: November 2015
- Publication place: South Africa
- ISBN: 9781770229204

The Secret Society: Cecil John Rhodes's Plan for a New World Order is a 2015 book by Robin Brown.

== Synopsis ==
The Secret Society examines Cecil Rhodes, his life and the secret society he founded with the ambition of bringing the world under British rule. The book suggests the society continued to have influence in British and world affairs, citing the Rhodes Scholarship and alleged links between the society and Chatham House and alleged influence on the peace terms to end World War I and appeasement of Hitler. The book draws on diaries and letters and also investigates and supports suggestions Rhodes was gay.

== Reception ==
In the Mail & Guardian Shaun De Waal wrote that "In The Secret Society, Brown explores the enigma of Rhodes, delving into his homosexuality more deeply than any work on him so far and showing how Rhodes's dreams of an expanded British empire were codified early in his career" In Business Day Richard Steyn wrote "by challenging the conventional wisdom about Rhodes, The Secret Society provides a stimulating and thought-provoking read" but criticised the lack of a bibliography and the small number of references.

The book was also reviewed in other sources such as Noseweek and The Star.
