= War Commander =

2011 video game

- War Commander logo
- Developer: Kixeye
- Publisher: Kixeye
- Platforms: Microsoft Windows, macOS
- Release: Open beta: September 13, 2011
- Genres: Strategy, Combat, Wargaming

War Commander is an online multiplayer game developed by Kixeye. The game has over nine thousand concurrently online users as of July 2024. Made in September 2011, the game is still one of Kixeye's biggest hits, receiving regular updates (e.g., AI, synchronous battle mode, etc.).

== Gameplay ==
The game is a post-apocalyptic landscape 30 years after civilization collapsed. The player fights other factions for oil, metal and thorium. There are tanks, aircraft, and infantry that the player can fight with. Every month there is an event where the player must defend against waves of overpowered enemies to gain points from winning the attack wave. Players can spend the points in the event shop for new overpowered units and else. Sectors are sections of the world where the player base and others are at. There are 200 sectors where the player can relocate to. An alliance is a group created by a player. It costs 5,000,000 (5 million) thorium to create one. There are four types of positions in the Alliance: Leader, Officer, Member, and Recruit. Players may relocate without losing the alliance tag. The total of members that can fit in one alliance is 200. Infamy is a measure of a player's skill in combat against other players. It is shown on a leaderboard where players can be compared. To get infamy, a player must attack another player's base and for each star, they earn while destroying that base and they get the most infamy if they get 3 stars. Earning a lot of infamy places you in different Tops in the leader board, with an infamy, the Gear store may reward you a certain amount. When you get an infamy even a single one, you can get medals for free (Rewarded). There are milestones in which a player must reach infamy wise in order to get a superior payout. Gear is a medal where if a player attacks another player's base and wins, they score one hit on the list. Players must score five hits on the list to get a gear payout every week. For each extra base they defeat, the player will get extra gear at the end of the week. The player spends the gear on new tanks, aircraft, soldiers, thorium, tech and spec ops. Rogue Faction is an organized group who have bases all around World Map in all Sectors. They are used for Operations, Onslaughts, Medal Bases, Shadow Ops,. You can also attack them for resources.

Shadow Ops is a mini event where the player must attack rogue bases on the world map and get points. For 100 points, a player gets a tier 1 crate; for 1000 points, they get a tier 2 crate; for 8000 points, they get an tier 3 crate. There are ten phases, one every week. For each phase a player completes by getting 8000 points, they get a part, if they get 8 out of 10 parts they get a special unique unit at the end of the ten weeks then it starts over again.

== Reception ==
Gamezebo gave a score of 60 out of 100.
