= High Society =

High society is a category of people deemed to have social status or prestige.

High Society may also refer to:

== Films ==
- High Society (1924 film), an Our Gang silent comedy
- High Society (1932 film), a comedy film starring Florence Desmond
- High Society (1955 film), a Bowery Boys film
- High Society (1956 film), an MGM musical film
- High Society (2014 film), a French drama film
- High Society (2017 film), a German romantic comedy film
- High Society (2018 film), a South Korean film

== Music ==
- "High Society" (Bear Hands song)
- "High Society" (composition), a 1901 jazz standard written by Porter Steele
- High Society (Enon album)
- High Society (Epik High album)
- High Society (High Contrast album)
- High Society (Kottonmouth Kings album)
- High Society (soundtrack), from the 1956 film
- High Society (The Silver Seas album)

== Musicals ==
- High Society (musical), a 1998 Broadway musical based on the 1956 film
- High Society (musical) § Other versions, a 2004 West End musical based on the 1956 film

== Publications ==
- High Society (comics), a Cerebus the Aardvark story
- High Society (magazine), a U.S. pornographic magazine
- High Society (novel), by Ben Elton

== Television ==
- High Society (1995 TV series), an American sitcom
- High Society (2010 TV series), an American reality show
- High Society (2015 TV series), a South Korean drama series

== Buildings ==
- High Society (Canberra), a high-rise residential complex in Canberra, Australia

== See also ==
- Gentry
- Socialite
- Upper class
