= Stillfront Group =

Video game company

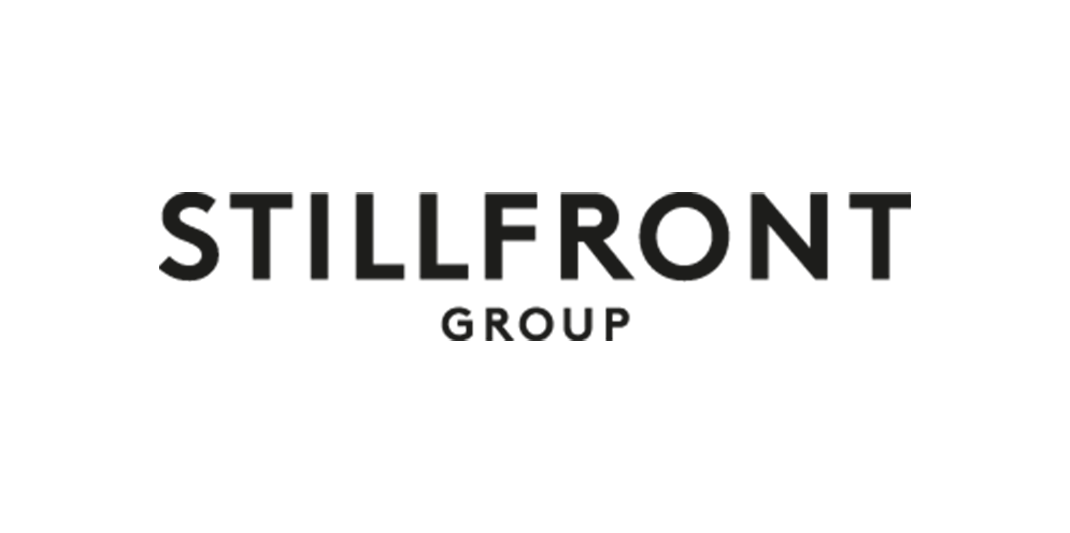
- Type: Public
- Traded as: First North: SF
- Industry: Video games
- Founded: 2010; 16 years ago in Sweden
- Founder: Jörgen Larsson
- Area served: Worldwide
- Website: stillfront.com

Stillfront Group is a Swedish company specialized in the acquisition and management of mobile and browser game studios.

== History ==
Stillfront was founded in 2010 by Jörgen Larsson, a Swedish entrepreneur, although it didn't start operating until 2012. The plan was to build a diversified portfolio of long life-cycle games by acquiring independent gaming studios and letting these operate independently within the same group. Stillfront's main markets are the US, Germany, France and the Middle East. The company is mainly focused on free-to-play mobile games.

== Acquisitions ==
In November 2012, Stillfront acquired Power Challenge, a mobile and browser-based social sports management game developer and publisher.

In November 2013, Stillfront announced it had acquired 51% of Bytro Labs and entered into an agreement to acquire the remaining 49% by 2016. The addition of Bytro further expanded Stillfront's games portfolio with titles such as Supremacy 1914, Call of war and Industry Tycoon and strengthened the company within the strategy game genre.

In December 2015, Stillfront completed an IPO and listed its shares on NASDAQ First North Stockholm. The listing price was SEK 39 per share and the first day of trading was December 8, 2015.

In June 2016, Stillfront announced its acquisition of the majority of shares in Simutronics, one of the longest-running independent game development studios in North America. Simutronics developed MUD-style text-based games GemStone IV and DragonRealms, as well as mobile games Tiny Heroes, One Epic Knight and Lara Croft Relic Run.

In December 2016, Stillfront acquired Babil Games, a Middle East and North Africa (MENA) region mobile games publisher.

In May 2017, Stillfront Group acquired eRepublik Labs, adding game titles like eRepublik, Age of Lords and World at War: WW2 Strategy MMO to the group.

In June the same year, the listing of Stillfront's shares was moved to NASDAQ First North Premier Growth Market.

In January 2018, Stillfront completed the acquisition of Goodgame Studios for €270 million.

In October 2018, Stillfront also acquired Imperia Online JSC, a game developer and publisher based in Sofia, Bulgaria. Imperia, which was founded in 2009, was initially focused on browser-based games, with its flagship title being Imperia Online, before expanding into mobile game development. The company, which operates from office space Infinity Tower in Sofia, had developed more than 30 games for web browsers, iOS, Android, Windows Phone, and Steam as of January 2025. One of these titles, "Crush Them All", was nominated for Best RPG at the TIGA Awards in 2021, and was also a finalist in 2023.

In December 2018, Stillfront acquired Playa Games, a casual strategy game developer and publisher in Germany.

In the summer of 2019, Stillfront acquired Kixeye, a developer and publisher of massively multiplayer online real-time strategy games (MMORTS) for PC and mobile devices.

In January 2020, Stillfront announced the acquisition of Storm8, a mobile mash-up game developer headquartered in California for up to $400 million. In September 2020, Stillfront announced it has acquired Nanobit for $100 million.

In January 2021, Stillfront announced its intent to acquire Hong Kong based mobile game publisher 6waves, including purchasing the 34.8% stake previously owned by Nexon for $93 million, for a grand total of $201 million.

On September 9, 2021, Stillfront acquired Arabic online card game company Jawaker for $205 million.

In January 2022, Stillfront acquired 6waves for $201M.

== Studios ==
List of studios
Name	Location	Acquired	Ref(s).
Coldwood Interactive	Umeå, Sweden	2011	
Power Challenge	Linköping, Sweden	2012	
Dorado Games	Malta	2014	
Babil Games	Dubai, United Arab Emirates	2016	
Bytro Labs	Hamburg, Germany	2016	
Simutronics	St. Louis, United States	2016	
OFM Studios	Cologne, Germany	2017	
eRepublik Labs	Dublin, Ireland	2017	
Goodgame Studios	Hamburg, Germany	2017	
Imperia Online	Sofia, Bulgaria	2018	
Playa Games	Hamburg, Germany	2018	
Kixeye	Victoria, Canada	2019	
Storm8	California, United States	2020	
Candywriter	Miami, United States	2020	
Nanobit	Zagreb, Croatia	2020	
Everguild	London, United Kingdom	2020	
Sandbox Interactive	Berlin, Germany	2020	
Super Free Games	San Francisco, United States	2020	
Moonfrog	Bangalore, Karnataka	2021	
Game Labs	Kyiv, Ukraine	2021	
Jawaker	Abu Dhabi, United Arab Emirates	2021	
6waves	Wan Chai, Hong Kong	2022	
