= Massively multiplayer online real-time strategy game =

Video game genre

Massively multiplayer online real-time strategy game (MMORTS) mixes the genres of real-time strategy and massively multiplayer online games, possibly in the form of web browser-based games, in which a very large number of players interact with one another within a virtual world. Players often assume the role of a general, king, or other type of figurehead leading an army into battle while maintaining the resources needed for such warfare. The titles are often based in a sci-fi or fantasy universe and are distinguished from single or small-scale multiplayer RTSes by the number of players and common use of a persistent world, generally hosted by the game's publisher, which continues to evolve even when the player is offline.

== Economics ==
Many MMORTSs feature living economies. Virtual items and currency have to be gained through play and have definite value for players. Such a virtual economy can be analyzed (using data logged by the game) and has value in economic research; more significantly, these "virtual" economies can affect the economies of the real world.

Such games that feature these economies may also allow commodity trading and simulated stock markets.

== See also ==
- List of massively multiplayer online games
- List of free massively multiplayer online games
- List of massively multiplayer online real-time strategy games
- Server emulator
- Virtual goods
- Digital currency
- Virtual economy
- Virtual world
