= Video games in Indonesia =

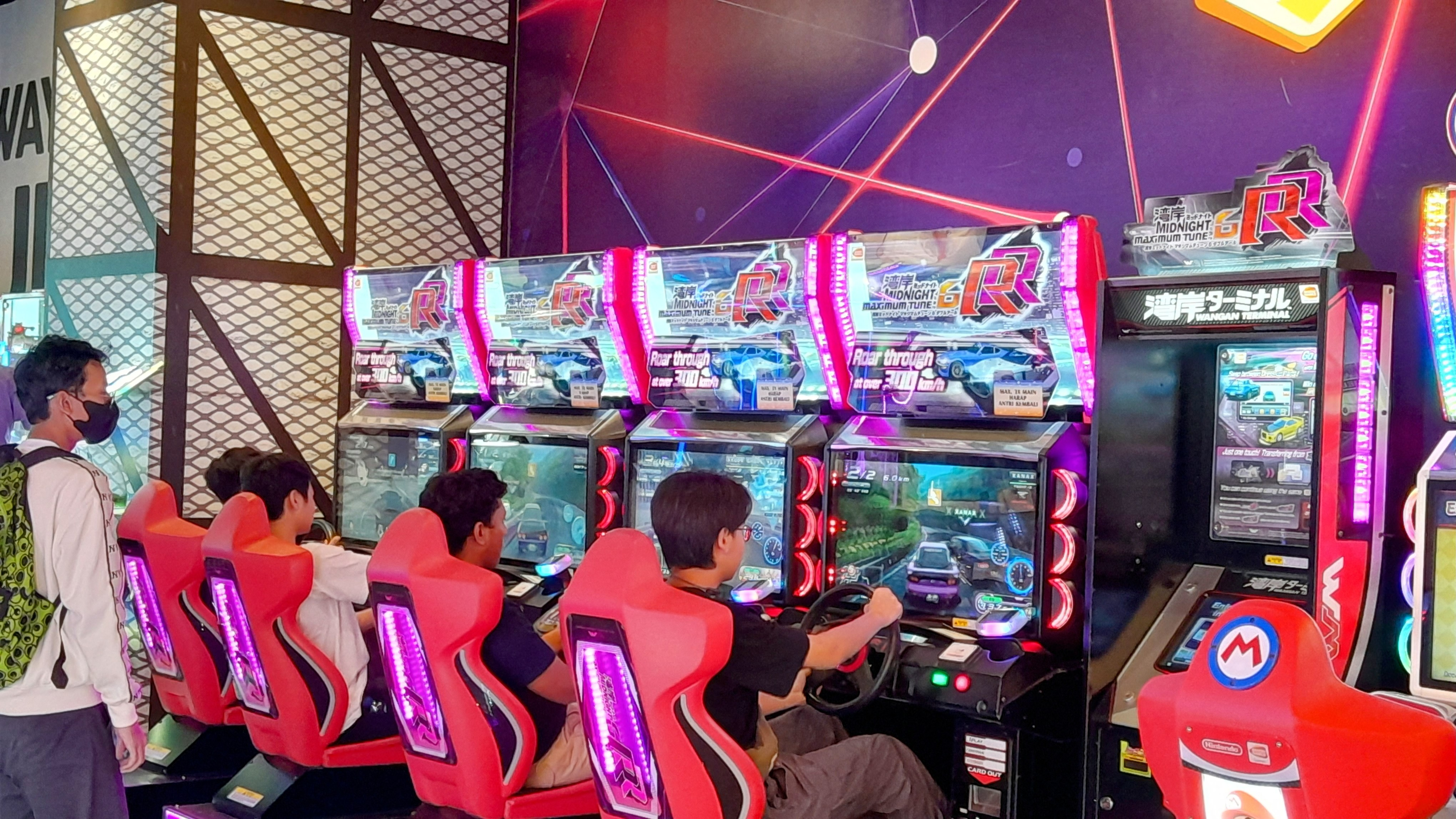
People playing Wangan Midnight Maximum Tune 6 RR at Pondok Indah Mall, Jakarta

Video gaming in Indonesia is a growing sector, holding the 16th largest market in the world and about half of the Southeast Asian market in 2017. Over 40 million people in the country are active gamers, with mobile gaming being the dominant sector in terms of revenue. The development of video games in the country began with imported consoles and arcade centres, prior to developments of online gameplay in PC games and increasing prevalence of the internet cafés. Mobile games only began gaining importance as smartphones were introduced.

The Indonesian video game industry contributed about US$1.1 billion to the national economy in 2015, despite only earning a small fraction of the local gaming revenues. Video game piracy is also prevalent across the country, making up the majority of installed games.

== History ==
Development of video games in Indonesia began in the mid-1980s through imported video game consoles such as the SNES, Sega Mega Drive/Genesis, PlayStation and Xbox. Arcade centres also appeared, including major chains Timezone which started in Indonesia at 1995 and Amazone which was established in 2001. Local entertainment chains such as Funworld which was established in 1983, have also began introducing Arcade machines and games as a part of their brand expansion. According to a designer from Namco Bandai, 1,000 of the 1,500 arcade machines distributed in Asia Pacific operated in Indonesia.

Later on, by the late 1990s and early 2000s PC games such as StarCraft, Counter-Strike, Lineage II and World of Warcraft and its mod Defense of the Ancients caught on alongside their online features. While most of the games were imported, there were several locally developed games such as Nusantara Online (a MMO which featured precolonial Indonesian history). There were also several localised games, such as Audition Online which was localised as AyoDance when it was launched for Indonesia in 2007. This contributed to a major boom in internet cafés (known locally as warnet, a portmanteau of warung internet), which had 2,500 locations across the country in 2002 and 5,000 by 2007.

Due to the size of the Indonesian market, several games were localised specifically for the nation's audience. Examples include South Korean online first-person shooter Special Force which featured levels in Jakarta with the Monumen Nasional as a background, Point Blank and Lost Saga both of which featured several aspects of Indonesian Culture into their respective content and Harvest Moon which features an official specialized Indonesian translation. Matahari Studios, which closed down in 2010, is often credited as being the first local video game developer in the country, although it more often took outsourcing work from major studios instead of developing its own games.

More recently, growth in the number of smartphone users have fuelled growth in mobile online games, aided by the lower development costs associated for local developers. This change also allowed extension of the playerbase beyond typical youth gamers to a more casual demographic, with the game platforms including Facebook in addition to the application stores of iOS and Android.

The 2018 Asian Games, held in Indonesia, included a demonstration event for Esports.

== Statistics ==
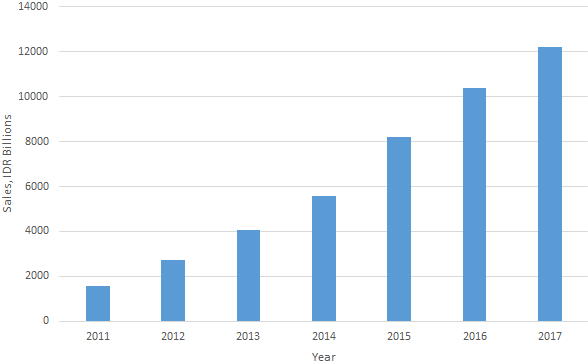
Indonesian video game sales, 2011–2017.

According to gaming researcher Newzoo, in 2017 there were an estimated 43.7 million active gamers in Indonesia, spending a total of US$879.7 million for an average annual spending of US$20.13 per person. This made Indonesia the largest gaming market in Southeast Asia and 16th largest globally, just behind Taiwan and ahead of India. According to Euromonitor, the industry revenues had grown from IDR 1.812 trillion in 2011 to IDR 11.395 trillion by 2016, for a growth of 44.4% annually. Another research from Unity Technologies found that Indonesia's video game market was the fastest–growing in Southeast Asia. Of the 2016 sales, about 98% was through internet retailing in form of software. Sales of video game hardware, including consoles and accessories, amounted to just around IDR 200 billion annually between 2011 and 2016.

Approximately 56% of PC game players in Indonesia are males, with the 21–35 age group making up the largest demographic. According to Euromonitor, Sony consoles are the most popular with a 60.6% market share followed by Microsoft and Nintendo. Mobile games make up the majority of the revenues, with a 52% revenue share in 2015.

== Gaming culture ==
Video Games Indonesia (VGI), founded in 2002, was the oldest gaming community in Indonesia prior to its shutdown in 2016.

A 2013 study estimated the prevalence of video game addiction among Indonesian school students at over 10 per cent, although its authors admitted that improvements to the study's methodology were required to draw a proper conclusion.

=== Warnets and PC Gaming ===
Despite declining in recent years due to the spread of smartphones and better quality mobile internet, internet cafés are still prevalent in large cities and small towns alike with some providing higher–end computers for competitive gaming. Popular online PC Games in Indonesia tend to be free to play games, such as Point Blank, Counter Strike, Lost Saga, Grand chase, Audition Online, Elsword, Dragon Nest, Atlantica Online, Ragnarok Online, PlayerUnknown's Battlegrounds, Apex Legends, Valorant and Dota 2. Some of these games are managed and localised by local publishing companies. Most notably Gemscool, one of the largest online PC-gaming service provider and publisher in Indonesia prior to the company's shut down in 2021.

=== Rental PS and Console Gaming ===
Console gaming gained prevalence in Indonesia in the late 1980s and the 1990s, following the introductions video game consoles such as the SNES and the Sega Genesis, The first e-sports tournament held in the country was a Super Mario Bros. competition, held in Surabaya in 1989, around these times, Console rental centers began to pop up throughout the country. Sony's PlayStation 2 entered and dominated the Indonesian market in the early 2000s, with video games such as Winning Eleven, Harvest Moon, SmackDown, Downhill Domination, Resident Evil 4, God Of War, Rumble Racing, The Warriors, Dynasty Warriors 5, Sengoku Basara, Def Jam: Fight for NY, God Hand, Metal Slug 6, Tekken 5, Guitar Hero, Black, Need For Speed, and Grand Theft Auto: San Andreas gaining a huge cult following among the Indonesian youth. Sony would continue to dominate the Indonesian console market in the following years with the release of PlayStation 3 and PlayStation 4 both of which are also popularly available among console rental centers within the country.

Console rental centers across Indonesia tend to use PlayStation consoles, hence the term Rental PS. Just like its Warnet counterparts, Console rental centers have been declining in recent years due to the prevalence of Smartphones and better mobile internet, despite this, Console rental centers are still prevalent in larger cities and smaller towns.

Unique to the country's console gaming scene, Modded console games, typically Grand Theft Auto: San Andreas are commonly found throughout the country's game market.

=== Mobile gaming ===
In recent times, Mobile games are particularly popular in Indonesia, following growing internet penetration as well as the introduction of Smartphones. Strategy mobile games such as Clash of Clans and Game of War: Fire Age were among the most popular titles in 2014. There is also a significant competitive scene, with eSports tournaments for mobile games such as Vainglory being held in Jakarta. other mobile game titles with a large player base in Indonesia are Moblie Legends, PUBG Mobile, Free Fire Battlegrounds, Clash Royale and Call of Duty: Mobile.

== Local industry ==
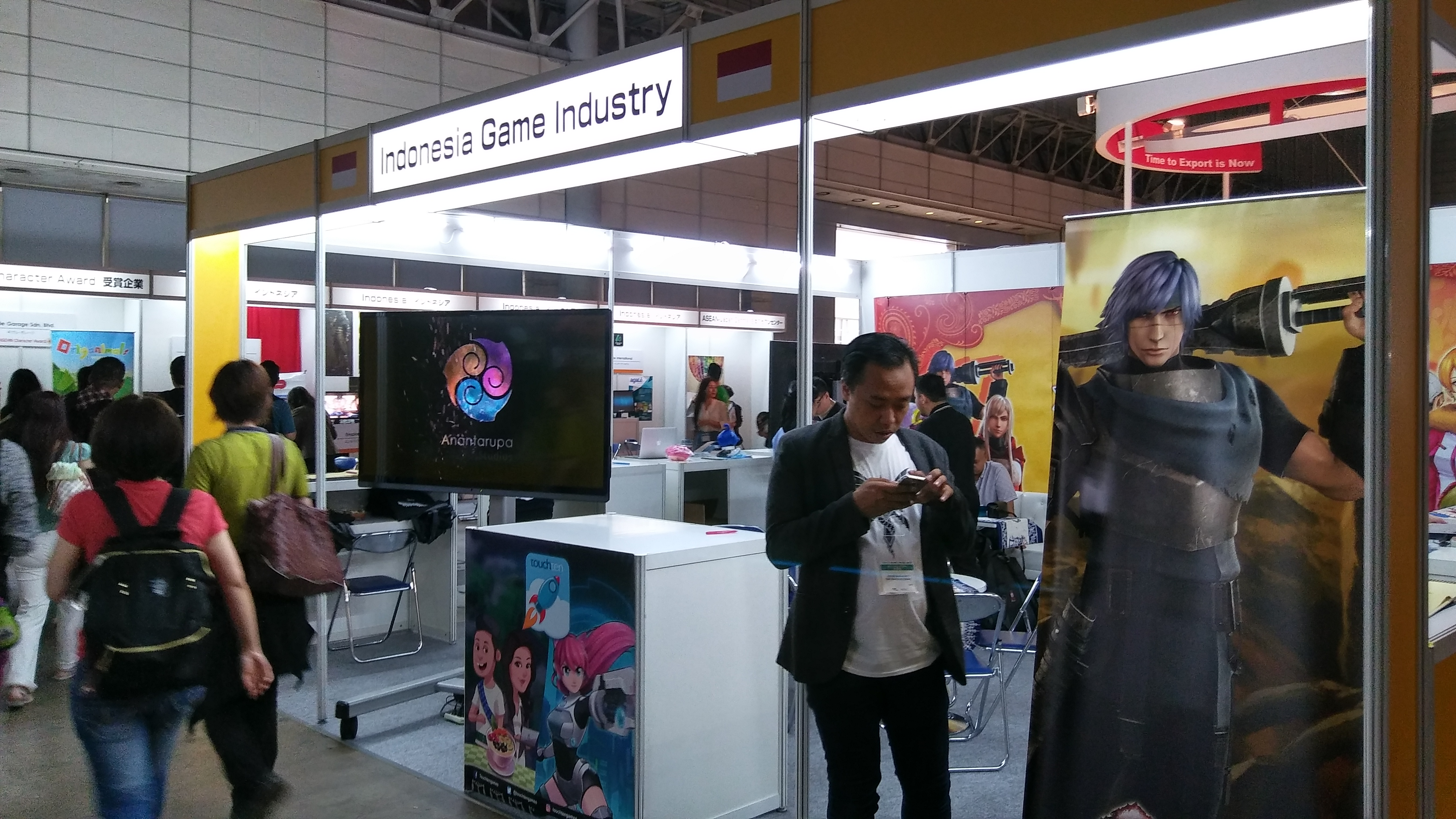
Indonesian stall in the 2016 Tokyo Game Show.

The Creative Economy Agency (Indonesian: Badan Ekonomi Kreatif or Bekraf), formed in 2015, is the government body responsible for aiding in and managing the development of the gaming industry as part of its task to develop Indonesia's creative industries. It also holds an annual trade show known as Game Prime since 2016, which targets developers from Indonesia and the ASEAN. The Indonesian Game Association (Indonesian: Asosiasi Game Indonesia), formed in 2013, acts as the industry's trade association.

The video games industry in Indonesia comprised 1.77% of the national creative economy (IDR 15.08 trillion) in 2015 according to Statistics Indonesia, with only 20% of developers being part of an association. It sustained at least 2,200 jobs in 2017. However, it contributed only 1.8% to the domestic market according to Anton Soeharyo, chief executive of local developer TouchTen. Director-general of informatics application Semuel Abrijani Pangerapan from the Ministry of Communication and Informatics gave a different figure, at 10 per cent market share in 2016.

Local game developers are targeted to hold 50 per cent of the national market by 2020. In January 2016, chairman of the Indonesian Game Association Andy Suryanto estimated that there were around 1,000 active local game developers in the country. On the other hand, Unity Technologies gave a figure of about 400 developers producing over 1,000 games. Most of the new titles created are targeted towards the PC or the mobile market, with only a single game released for the PlayStation 4 in recent times and none for the other major consoles. Lyto, which publishes foreign MMOs such as Ragnarok Online and Crossfire, was the largest local developer in terms of revenue according to Euromonitor.

Due to various factors, most new Indonesian video game studios do not stay in business for longer than five years. There have been several local mobile game hits, including incremental game Tahu Bulat in 2017. The Ministry of Trade has budgeted US$2.1 million in 2015 to prepare a roadmap and support the gaming industry.

=== Games and developers ===
Some of the more notable games developed in Indonesia include:

- Restaurant Rush (2008)
- Sentou Gakuen (2011)
- Samurai Taisen (2013)
- DreadOut (2014)
- Fallen Legion (2017)
- Legrand Legacy (2018)
- Rage in Peace (2018)
- Coffee Talk (2020)
- When the Past Was Around (2020)
- Kitaria Fables (2021)
- Potion Permit (2022)
- A Space for the Unbound (2023)
- Coffee Talk Episode 2: Hibiscus & Butterfly (2023)
- Coral Island (2023)
- Afterlove EP (2025)
- Coffee Talk Tokyo (2026)

Notable Development companies include:

- Agate International
- Digital Happiness
- Lyto
- Toge Productions
- Own Games
- OZYSOFT
- Vifth Floor
- Gambir Studio
- GameChanger Studio
- StoryTale Studio
- 4Happy Studio
- Kidalang Studio
- Mojiken Studio
- Lentera Studio
- Stairway Games

Additionally. French Video Game company Gameloft also maintains a studio in Yogyakarta.

Notable Publishing companies include:

- Garena Indonesia
- Gemscool (Closed in 2021)
- Megaxus
- Indofun

Additionally. Various video game companies, such as Asiasoft, Gravity, Riot Games, and Moonton also maintains corporate offices in Jakarta.

== Rating ==
The IGRS ratings used in Indonesia
The IGRS rating SU was discontinued in 2023

Indonesia has its own game rating system, the Indonesia Game Rating System which was launched by the Ministry of Communication and Informatics in 2016. It categorises video games into the following classifications:

- SU/Semua Umur (all ages), Discontinued in 2023.
- 3+ (for ages 3 and up)
- 7+ (for ages 7 and up)
- 13+ (for ages 13 and up)
- 15+ (for ages 15 and up)
- 18+ (for ages 18 and up)

== Piracy ==
Video game piracy is common in Indonesia as with software piracy in general, with BSA estimating 84% of all software installed in Indonesian companies throughout 2013 being unlicensed. Many stores in Indonesia offer illegally downloaded video games burned into DVDs for significantly less than its normal retail price, with Wii games being sold for IDR 20,000 (US$2) or less. Due to the nature of Indonesian copyright laws, video game companies are required to bring the lawsuits against the illegal merchants to court, the cost of which would often outweigh the benefits.

When online-only consoles such as the PlayStation 3 was released in Indonesia, authorised dealers initially controlled the distribution. However, once piracy took up these distributors withdrew from the country, causing a scarcity of authentic video game copies and raising the prices–resulting in further increase in piracy.
