= Gravity Interactive =

Gravity Interactive, Inc.
- Company type: Subsidiary
- Industry: Video games
- Founded: March 2003; 23 years ago
- Headquarters: Buena Park, California
- Area served: North America
- Services: Video game publishing
- Parent: Gravity
- Website: www.warpportal.com

Gravity Interactive LLC was created to host games for North America developed by GRAVITY Co., Ltd. It is based in Buena Park near Orange County, California. Gravity was initially provided with several servers from Gravity Co., and began beta testing of the International Ragnarok Online (iRO) service in 2003. Commercial service subsequently began on June 1, 2003. In 2005, Gravity also began hosting the North American version of ROSE Online (naROSE). On January 1, 2006, Gravity Interactive LLC became Gravity Interactive, Inc. In February 2008, Gravity began beta testing its third MMORPG, Requiem: Bloodymare. Around mid to late 2012 Gravity began beta testing its fourth MMORPG, Maestia: Rise Of Keledus. In April 2013, Gravity began beta testing the second title in the Ragnarok Online series. Ragnarok Online 2 was launched in May 2013 and also available on Steam.

== PC Games ==
Games which Gravity Interactive currently offers include:

- Ragnarok Online
- Requiem: Rise of the Reaver (developed in-house)
- Dragon Saga (previously known as Dragonica, Developed in-house)
- Ragnarok Online 2
- Various other Ragnarok Online games

Games which Gravity Interactive previously offered include:

- ROSE Online (developed in-house)
- Eternal Destiny
- CrimeCraft
- FreeStyle Street Basketball
- Maestia: Rise Of Keledus
- Metal Assault

== Mobile Games ==
Games which Gravity Interactive currently offers include:

- Ragnarok Online: Valkyrie Uprising (Mobile)
- Ice Penguin (Mobile)
- Tower of Ascension (Mobile)
- Ragnarok: Ash Vacuum (Mobile)

== L5 Games ==
In 2007, Gravity founded a new game developer, L5 Games. Its employees consisted of those formerly employed by Blizzard Entertainment. This subsidiary of Gravity Interactive, rather than GRAVITY Co., Ltd., was formed to develop games for the North American market. L5 Games went into liquidation in August 2008.
