= Ragnarok Online 2 =

Ragnarok Online 2 may refer to:

- Ragnarok Online 2: The Gate of the World, a game which entered beta testing in 2006 but was discontinued in 2010 due to poor reception
- Ragnarok Online 2: Legend of the Second, a revised game, officially released in 2013
