= Level Up! Games =

Philippine video game company

Level Up! Inc.
- Company type: Subsidiary company
- Traded as: Level Up! Interactive S.A.U
- Industry: Software, video games
- Founded: 2002; 24 years ago
- Headquarters: Makati, Philippines
- Products: See complete list of products
- Parent: Asiasoft
- Website: www.levelupgames.com.br

Level Up! Inc., more commonly known by the trademark Level Up! Games, is a Philippine game publishing studio owned by Asiasoft since 2014. According to their website, they currently have operations in the Philippines and Latin America.

== History ==
Level Up! Games was one of the first online game publishing companies in the Philippines. In 2002, Level Up! introduced Oz World, the very first massively multiplayer online game in the Philippines. The following year, Level Up! launched the first massively multiplayer online role-playing game (MMORPG), Ragnarok Online. They followed up by introducing ROSE Online and RF Online in the country.

In 2004, Level Up! partnered with Tectoy to expand into Brazil. In February 2005, Level Up! Games Brazil launched its first MMORPG in the country: a free version of the company's franchise Ragnarok Online, translated into Portuguese. This game was followed by numerous releases in Brazil over the next few years.

ePLDT, the digital entertainment division of the Philippine Long Distance Telephone Company (PLDT), acquired Level Up! Philippines in 2006, and merged their portfolios of online games. That same year, the first Level Up! Live event took place, with championship competitions held for four games: Ragnarok Online, Rose Online, RF Online, and Freestyle. Level Up! continued to publish new games, including Perfect World and Silkroad Online. They also had their first Level Up! School Tour, going as far north as Baguio and south to Davao City. The company expanded into India in the same year, partnering with Indiatimes to publish Ragnarok Online in the country.

In 2008, the Philippines was selected to be the host for the annual Ragnarok World Championship.

In 2010, the Level Up! Games Brazil expanded its partnership with Korean developer Nexon and brought to Brazil the first-person shooter Combat Arms. At the end of the year, the company launched the title Allods Online.

In October 2012, Level Up! Games merged with E-Games, creating the largest online game publishing operation in the Philippines. In the same year, Level Up! had 49% of its international shares bought by Tencent, China's leading internet service provider, for nearly 27 million dollars. Also in 2012, Level Up! Brazil released Turma do Chico Bento, their first game developed for social networking site, Facebook, at Level Up! Live 2012. Level Up! Games expanded into Latin America the same year.

Level Up! Games was acquired by Asiasoft for 2.9 million dollars in 2014. Since then, Level Up!'s portfolio has been published in Asia under PlayPark.

== Games distributed by the company ==
=== Brazil ===
- 9Dragons
- Aion: The Tower of Eternity
- Allods Online
- City of Heroes
- Combat Arms
- DarkEden
- DECO Online
- Dofus
- FunOrb
- Grand Chase
- Khan Online
- Guild Wars
- Lineage II
- Lunia
- Maple Story
- Pangya
- Perfect World
- Ragnarok Online
- RuneScape
- Silkroad Online
- Sudden Attack
- Trickster Online
- Turma do Chico Bento
- Warrior Epic
- Forsaken
- Eligium
- M.A.R.S.
- SMITE
- Elsword
- Assault Fire (as 'Ni Zhan' in China)
- Warface
- GunZ: The Duel

=== India (Closed as of 2009) ===
- Freestyle
- World OZ
- Ragnarok Online
- Gunz Online
- A3India

=== Philippines ===
- Assault Fire
- Ragnarok
- Cabal
- K.O.S. Secret Operations
- RAN Online
- Perfect World

==== Current ====
- Perfect World
- Audition PH
- World In Audition
- Cabal Online
- Assault Fire (Ni Zhan in China)
- Special Force

==== Former ====
- Ragnarok Online local service was shut down on March 31, 2015. Players were then transferred to WarpPortal's international server in April 2015.
- Grand Chase (local server was shut down in November 2014)
- Eligium
- Rohan (Closed as of October 2014)
- Flyff (Closed as of September 2014)
- Bounty Hounds Online
- Silkroad Online
- Oz World
- Crazy Kart
- Crazy Kart 2: Race Battle Online
- Allods Online
- Band Master
- Point Blank (transferred to Garena (2014))
- Pangya
- K.O.S. Secret Operations (Sting: The Secret Operations)
- Freestyle Online (global servers were closed in 2010)
- RF Online
- ROSE Online
- RAN Online

=== South East Asia (Through Asiasoft / Playpark) ===
- Phantasy Star Online 2 (closed and never been able to move on Patch from Dark Falz S2 patch)
- Football Club Manager
- Strife
- Maple Story
- DC Universe Online
- Sudden Attack
- AVA
- Chaos Online
- Dance Battle Audition (used to be available international, was changed and never informed players)
