= RO2 =

RO2 can stand for one of the following:

- Red Orchestra 2: Heroes of Stalingrad
- Ragnarok Online 2: Legend of the Second
  - Ragnarok Online 2: The Gate of the World, the cancelled version of the above game
- Organic peroxide or other compounds with the peroxide group
- Japanese submarine Ro-2, an Imperial Japanese Navy submarine commissioned in 1920 and stricken in 1932
