= Coffee Talk =

Coffee Talk may refer to:

- "Coffee Talk" (Saturday Night Live), a Saturday Night Live sketch
- Coffee Talk (video game), a 2020 visual novel
  - Coffee Talk Episode 2: Hibiscus & Butterfly, its 2023 sequel
