= Lyto =

Company of Indonesia

LYTO is an Indonesian online game publisher (LYTOGAME), and has been established in 2003. LYTO is one of the pioneer game publishing company in South East Asia with more than 30 million members across the region.

LYTO has published many variety of different MMO (Massive Multiplayer Online) originating from Asia. The games as of today are Ragnarok Online (Korea), Getamped (Japan), Seal Online (Korea), RF Online (Korea), Idol-Street, Perfect World (China), Atlantica Online, Luna Online and Crossfire (Korea).

On 2019, LYTO expanded its business as a Production House for filmmaking (LYTO PICTURES). LYTO PICTURES has produced PAMALI (2022) and PAMALI: DUSUN POCONG (2023).

LYTO also often holds various events. One of them is held every year, called “LYTO Game Festival”. LYTO Game Festival usually contains game competitions, gatherings, and cosplay, while promoting their own game products. Lyto Game Festival usually attended by thousand gamers from all over Indonesia.

LYTO has established many centers throughout Jakarta.

== Published online game ==
- Ragnarok Online
- Crossfire
- RF Online
- Perfect World
- Idol-Street
- Rohan: Blood Feud
- Atlantica Online
- Luna Online
- Seal Online
- Maple Story
- Requiem Online
- Avalon Online
- Granado Espada
- Avatar Land
- Getamped-R
- Crazy Kart
- Allods Online
- Jade Dynasty
- Forsaken World
- S4 League
- Fiesta Evolution
- Phantomers
- Juragan Ojek
- Kingdoms: Iron & Blood
- Angel Squad Mobile
- Faunia Paw
- Fantasia Heroes
- Robowar Android
- Pixel Super Heroes
- Enneas Saga
- Kafe Impian

== Published MOVIE & Film ==
- DreadOut Movie (2019)
- Pamali Movie (2022)
- Pamali: Dusun Pocong (2023)
- Pengantin Iblis | The Demon's Bride (2025)
- Pamali: Tumbal (2025)
