= Huehuehue =

HueBR or HuehuehueBR is an internet joke and meme known for being spread through various online gaming chat rooms, resulting in bans, trolling, and other forms of punishment. The expression has also been used to describe these behaviors in other media.

== Origin ==
The term likely originated around 2010, when Brazilian online gamers began to be identified for their bad behavior in multiplayer matches, mainly in chat rooms, where they organized pranks on foreign players, involving looting, insults, and fights between foreign and Brazilian players in games like League of Legends and Ragnarok, resulting in bans and the suspension of the distribution of these games in Brazil.

The joke, and later the laughter, would be used for other forms of trolling, such as on social media, for provocation and spam.

== Impact ==
In 2008, a comic strip called Brazil vs. MMO was created and published by an anonymous user. The meme gained even more traction on social media in the form of a character with bulging eyes and missing teeth, holding a Brazilian flag, and was used by Brazilians themselves to humorously represent the behavior of these gamers. The character also appeared as the protagonist in the games like Zueirama.
