= Ragnarok Online: Valkyrie Uprising =

2013 video game

- Developer: Gravity
- Publisher: NEOCYON
- Platforms: iOS, Android
- Release: NA: April 11, 2013
- Genre: MMORPG
- Mode: Multiplayer

Ragnarok Online: Valkyrie Uprising was a free MMORPG developed by Gravity and published by NEOCYON for iOS and Android in 2013. The game's servers have been closed since 2018. In 2022, a sequel named Ragnarok V: Returns was released.

== Plot ==
After a 100-year war with the Demons, the humans of Midgard forged a fragile truce with the scourge of the Underworld. Valkyrie Randgris threatened the human world using a powerful item stolen from the Underworld, the Cursed Stone. Monica, from the Celestial Land of Valhalla, defeated Randgris and was able to seal her away, never to be seen again. At the time of the game's setting, a mysterious woman broke the seal and disappeared. This releases the dark powers of Randgris and her Cursed Stone, and she is free to terrorize the human world once again.

== Classes ==
There are five classes available, sourced from the original game Ragnarok Online:

- Swordsmen
- Mage
- Acolyte
- Thief
- Archer

Swordsmen are a melee class that focuses on Strength and Vitality as primary stats. The swordsmen class can have two roles, a TANK or a DPS.

- TANK swordsmen - wield shields, and focus on increasing HP, DEF, and MDEF.
- DPS swordsmen - wield two-hand swords (cannot wield shields), and focus on increasing DAMAGE and ATTACK SPEED.

Mages are a casting class that focuses on Intelligence and Agility as primary stats.

Acolytes are a support class that focuses on a mixture of Strength/Agility and Intelligence as their primary stats.

Thieves are a melee class that focuses on Agility as their primary stat and a mixture of Strength and Vitality.

Archers are a ranged class that focuses on Agility and Strength as primary stats.

== Servers ==
Up until May 13, 2015, the game ran on six different servers:

- Poring
- Mímir
- Asgard
- Valhalla
- Ran
- Alfeim

On May 13, 2015, they were merged into three servers:

- Poring and Ran became Griffon
- Mimir and Alfheim became Ferus
- Asgard and Valhalla became Harpy
