= Lights Out (manhwa) =

1993–1994 manhwa by Lee Myung-jin

Lights Out An Evening When Something Good is About To Happen
- Cover of the Tokyopop edition of Lights Out vol. 1 (2005), art by Lee Myung-jin

어쩐지 좋은 일이 생길 것 같은 저녁 RR: Eojjeonji joeun iri saenggil geot gateun jeonyeok MR: Ŏtchŏnji choŭn iri saenggil kŏt kat'ŭn chŏnyŏk
- Author: Lee Myung-jin
- English publisher: (United States) Tokyopop
- Other publishers: (South Korea) Daewon C.I.
- Magazine: Comic Champ
- Original run: 1993–1994
- Collected volumes: 9

Lights Out (Korean: 어쩐지 좋은 일이 생길 것 같은 저녁; lit. 'An Evening When Something Good is About To Happen') is a 1993 manhwa written by Lee Myung-jin, the author of Ragnarok. It was serialized in biweekly manhwa magazine Comic Champ from 1993 to 1994. It was collected into nine volumes.

The story is about the high school student Nam Gung Geon, a violent transfer student from the Chi Jon High School to Puk Ye High School. His life is changed by meeting Min Seung-Ah, the landlady of the inn named Fate, granddaughter of the inn owner, and also a beautiful girl. In the end, Geon meets many friends such as Sin Na-Rae, Kim Mi-Na, Ji-Ae, Kim Tae-Min, and Son Seo-Ho, and many girls have a crush on him because he wins the 2nd award of the Motor Grandprix.

== Characters ==
=== Fate Inn ===
- Nam Gung Gun

The hero of the story. He was too violent but now he learns the power is not all for a man, the love is needed. He learns what friendship is. He now is one of the popular people of Seoul for winning the 2nd reward of the Motor Grandprix and his unbelievable strength.

- Min Seung-Ah

The heroine of the story. She is the granddaughter of the owner of the inn Fate. She is pretty, clever, soft and good-cooking. She and Gun after all are a couple.

- Kim Tae-Min

He is the closest friend of Gun in Puk Ye High School. He is the son of the President of the Galaxy Community. He sometimes acts like a fool with the bamboo hat and suddenly changes when removing the hat.

- Inn owner Min

Grandpa of Seung-Ah.

- So Deong-Re

A pervert guest of the inn. He sometimes fools Gun with "some tricks".

=== Puk Ye High School ===
- Sin Na-Rae

Close friend of Seung-Ah. She is called the Puk-Ye Radar web.

- Kim Mi-Na

First she was an experienced thief. Then she stops the thief-work and has a crush on Geon. Later, she and Tae-Min are a couple.

- Kim Tae-Min
- Son Seo-Ho

The boyfriend of Na-Rae. He's also the best friend of Tae-Min and Geon.

- Kang Eun-Hee

The chief of Puk Ye. He hates his girlish name so that he will kick the ass of all the "fools" who call him by his full name. His partners almost call him by Big Brother Kang. He has some junior partners such as the Puk-Do brothers.

== Video game ==
In 1997, Korean software developer T.G. Entertainment produced a video game adaption of the manhwa for PC, which was only published in South Korea. It is a side-scrolling beat 'em up.

== Reception ==
The manhwa sold over 1 million copies in circulation during its original run.
