= Fallen Legion =

2017 Role-playing video game series

- Fallen Legion: Rise to Glory cover art
- Genres: RPG; Platformer; Action
- Developers: Mintsphere, YummyYummyTummy
- Publisher: YummyYummyTummy
- Platforms: PlayStation 4; PlayStation Vita; Windows; Nintendo Switch; Xbox One; Xbox Series S; Xbox Series X
- Original release: North America - PS4/PSVita; July 18, 2017; Japan; January 31, 2018

Fallen Legion is a role-playing video game series developed by Indonesian studios Mintsphere and YummyYummyTummy. The games are a series of action-based sidescrolling RPGs in the style of traditional JRPGs.

A sequel, titled Fallen Legion: Revenants, released in February 2021 for the Nintendo Switch and PlayStation 4 and a Deluxe Edition containing both Rise to Glory and Revenants was announced for 2022 for PlayStation 5, Xbox One, and Xbox Series X/S

== Synopsis ==
The series focuses on the fictional Empire of Fenumia, which is in decline at the time of the game series. Fallen Legion: Sins of an Empire focuses on Princess Cecille, who reluctantly ascends the throne of the Fenumian Empire after the death of her father, and must combat an uprising led by the general Legatus Laendur.

Fallen Legion: Flames of Rebellion explores the story from the perspective of Legatus Laendur and his reasons for rebelling against the decrepit empire. Fallen Legion: Rise to Glory combines the storylines of Sins of an Empire and Flames of Rebellion, with additional content.

== Gameplay ==
The series is known for fast-paced, turn-based gameplay, done in the style of side-scrolling Japanese RPGs. Players take the role of either Princess Cecille or Legatus Laendur and command three spectral warriors known as Exemplars, each with their own differing abilities, on the battlefield. The game includes a "One Life Mode", in which players are unable to use retries, and the game ends after the primary character dies.

== Release history ==
The first game in the series, Fallen Legion: Sins of an Empire, was released on July 18, 2017 for PlayStation 4. A sequel, Fallen Legion: Flames of Rebellion was released on PlayStation Vita on July 18, 2017, and released on PlayStation 4 on December 12.

NIS America released Fallen Legion: Rise to Glory on Nintendo Switch on May 29, 2018 in North America and Japan. The game was subsequently released in Europe on June 1. Fallen Legion: Rise to Glory is a definitive version of the game, which included both Fallen Legion: Sins of an Empire and Fallen Legion: Flames of Rebellion, along with additional content. This version of the game includes the option to choose either English or Japanese language options. This game was also released on Xbox August 23, 2022.

Fallen Legion+ was released on Steam for PC on January 5, 2018. Fallen Legion+ combined Sins of an Empire and Flames of Rebellion as two separate campaigns in one game. In January 2019, Fallen Legion: Flames of Rebellion was released as a free game for PlayStation Plus subscribers.

== Development ==
Fallen Legion was developed by YummyYummyTummy, with artwork by Mintsphere. It was the first Indonesian video game to be released to consoles.

Xanthe Huynh and Darrel Delfin provided voice performances for Cecille and Legatus Laendur, respectively. The series was dubbed in Japanese, with Shizuka Ishigami voicing Cecille, and Hidenori Takahashi providing the voice for Legatus.

== Reception ==
Reception

Aggregate score
Aggregator	Score
Metacritic	66/100

Review scores
Publication	Score
Destructoid	7.5/10
GameZone	6.5/10
Nintendo Life	6/10

Fallen Legion: Sins of an Empire received "mixed or average" reviews according to the review aggregator Metacritic, based on 14 reviews. Fallen Legion: Rise to Glory has a 66 score on Metacritic, based on 11 critic reviews.

The series has been praised for its combat system, gameplay, and story, with some criticism for repetitiveness between games. Jon Mundy of Nintendo Life gave the game a mostly positive review, praising its combat system and dialogue, while mentioning some criticism for its sharp learning curve.

Destructoid gave the series received a 7.5 "Good" rating, with particular praise for the soundtrack and art style, commenting that "It definitely has the Japanese RPG fantasy feel down and made me think of PlayStation 1-era JRPGs".

Fallen Legion was showcased at the SAAM Arcade at the Smithsonian Museum in 2017, and at Bitsummit's 2017 event.

== Sequel ==
In June 2020, it was announced that a sequel was in the works. Titled Fallen Legion: Revenants, the game was released in February 2021 for the Nintendo Switch and PlayStation 4 and for Xbox consoles on August 23, 2022.
