= ROSE Online =

2005 video game

- Developers: Creator & former developer: Triggersoft; Former developers: naROSE: Gravity Interactive, Inc.; Current developers: naROSE: Rednim Games; jROSE: Faith Inc.
- Publishers: Current publishers: naROSE: Rednim Games; jROSE: Faith Inc.; Former publishers: naROSE: Gravity Interactive, Inc.
- Engine: ZnZin
- Platform: PC
- Release: naROSE: December 1, 2005 - February 11, 2019 naROSE: December 13, 2022 (Early Access) jROSE: July 7, 2005
- Genre: MMORPG
- Mode: Multiplayer

ROSE Online, or Rush On Seven Episodes Online (Korean: 로즈 온라인), is a massively multiplayer online roleplaying game (MMORPG) previously published by Korean company Gravity Corporation and developed by its subsidiary, Triggersoft on July 7, 2005. Up until 2007, the game was pay to play, but is now free-to-play.

== History ==
When Triggersoft stopped developing the game in 2007, the rights of ROSE Online were sold to 2 different companies which went on to develop and publish their own versions of the game for different regions (Japan and North America/Europe).

The North American/European region was served by Gravity Interactive, who developed and published a version of the game known as naROSE. They serviced 3 North American countries and 40 European countries, up until all of their games and services to the European regions were terminated on May 25, 2018. Gravity Interactive (also known by their website name "Warpportal") shut down the game entirely on February 11, 2019. As of September 2021, the development and publishing of ROSE Online for this region was taken over by Rednim Games. ROSE Online was relaunched on December 13th, 2022 into early access.

Japan was served by another branch of the game known as jROSE, exclusively developed for the Japanese market by ROSE Online Japan since 2013. Despite major financial difficulties, culminating in the studio filing for bankruptcy in 2020, they still promised to keep developing and publishing updates to the game in 2019.

== Gameplay ==
ROSE Online is a free roaming typical level-up based MMORPG featuring anime inspired graphics and "a very cute game environment" in comparison to other titles on the market. Players fight monsters, gain character levels, obtain new skills and find equipment to prepare themselves for future battles. Players travel to different planets and explore new environments as well as battle other players and declare wars against other clans. The game features its own in-game economy which is directly controlled by players. Supply and demand can change each day so it is up to the player to seize the opportunity.

A screenshot of the game, showing the current user interface.

In addition to leveling through the method of acquiring experience points leading to a level after the defeat of a monster, a character may also aid their leveling experience with the use of quests, which are initiated after speaking to a NPC. Some quests are given a time limit so the character must complete the quest to be eligible for a reward. A reward may be constituted of material items and is usually accompanied by an experience point reward and a money reward (the in-game currency is called Zulie). Rewards from quests are affected by the amount of charm a character has.

There are three types of items, to which the inventory is divided: Equipment, items that characters may wear on their bodies; Consumable, which consists of consumable items that may recover HP or MP, or perform an effect (i.e. dance, learn a skill, shoot fireworks, socket items), and Material, which covers general miscellany, such as materials for crafting, gems, and ammunition for weapons that need them.

Many items in the Equipment section of a player's inventory can be altered by refining or by drilling them to put a gem into them:

- Refining a piece of armor increases its defense by a marginal amount, which makes a great difference as the level of refinement continues to increase. Refining a given weapon will raise that weapon's Attack Power, which allows the possessor of that weapon to do increased amounts of damage. A given piece of equipment starts out at Refined (0), and will progress to a maximum of Refined (15).
- Gems, as previously mentioned, can be placed within either a player's weapon, or a few specific pieces of his armor (the chestpiece, as well as any jewellery he possesses). Each gem has a specific purpose, and varies in price depending on that purpose. A Diamond, for example, increases a player's Attack Power, and can be sold at high prices due to its high demand. A Jade, which increases Dodge Rate, is also rather useful, but not quite as much.

== Weapons and jobs ==
There are a variety of weapons to use in ROSE Online. The weapons are not restricted by the player's job, but by their level and a specific stat. The type of weapon a certain player should use is generally based on the class he chooses.

There are four basic jobs/classes:

- Soldiers are, as their name implies, generally based on the Strength Attribute, and therefore usually use weapons such as Swords, Spears, and Axes.
- Muses are generally healers, but can also become combat magicians later on in the game, and generally use Wands or Staffs.
- Dealers are a class based on economy and the ability to craft items; Dealers generally use guns and cannons, and have the ability to hire Mercenaries at will.
- Hawkers are a class based on the Attribute Dexterity, and rely on dodge rate and movement speed to take down their foe; Hawkers generally either use bows or dual wield katars or swords.

These four basic classes can later be upgraded into more advanced Secondary Classes:

- Soldiers can choose as their secondary class either to become a Champion or a Knight. Champions are based mostly on the Attack Power attribute, and generally wield a Two-Handed weapon (sword, spear, or axe). Knights are based generally on defense and therefore use a One-Handed weapon in combination with a shield on their other hand.
- Muses can become either Cleric (healers) or Mage (attackers). Clerics generally use Wands, so they can "buff" and "heal" other players, while Mages use staves.
- Dealers can turn into either Bourgeois (attackers) or Artisan (crafters). The former generally uses cannons while the latter generally uses pistols.
- Hawkers can turn into either Scouts or Raiders. The former generally uses a Bow and Arrow, and can summon a pet hawk to fight by his side, while the latter generally uses Katars and Dual-Wield Swords, and emphasizes its abilities of speed and stealth.

== Story ==
The seven planets of the world of ROSE Online were created by the goddess Arua, but Hebarn, the god of malice, took over the seventh planet and renamed it after himself. To protect the other planets from Hebarn, Arua created the Visitors and sent them to Junon, the first planet of ROSE Online.
