= Tavern Talk =

2024 fantasy visual novel

- Developer: Gentle Troll Entertainment
- Publisher: Gentle Troll Entertainment
- Engine: Unity
- Platforms: Nintendo Switch, MacOS, Windows
- Release: June 20, 2024
- Genre: Visual novel
- Mode: single-player

Tavern Talk is a visual novel developed by Gentle Troll Entertainment, and released on June 20, 2024 for Nintendo Switch and Windows. Players take control of a fantasy innkeeper who serves drinks and interacts with adventurers in a magical medieval setting.

== Gameplay ==
Players must mix a variety of different drinks and potions for customers. Each recipe has different effects on the characters' stats, which can influence their story. Players can also post quests for adventurers to go on. When patrons return from adventures, they can bring back items for the tavernkeeper to decorate the inn with.

== Plot ==
The game follows the owner of Wayfarer's Inn, a tavern in the fantasy land of Asteria. The player must serve drinks and interact with different adventurers who visit the tavern, including elves and vampires. As they talk to the various adventurers, they uncover more lore about an ancient threat which is rising in Asteria.

== Development ==
The game was developed by indie game developers Gentle Troll Entertainment. It was inspired by tabletop roleplaying games such as Dungeons & Dragons and visual novels like VA-11 Hall-A (2016) and Coffee Talk (2020). A free demo for the game was released on Steam on June 10. The full game was released on June 20, 2024.

The game's development was funded through the crowdfunding site Kickstarter, receiving more than twice its €20,000 fundraising goal within a day.

== Reception ==
Tavern Talk received "generally positive" reviews according to review aggregator Metacritic. Fellow review aggregator OpenCritic assessed that the game received strong approval, being recommended by 79% of critics.

Ben Sledge of The Gamer gave the first episode a positive review, writing that: "Tavern Talk doesn't just inhabit the cozy genre, it embodies it. Everything about this game exudes warmth, whether it's talking through your Elfin friend's anxieties about becoming an adventurer or the portents of the apocalypse." Katherine Castle of Eurogamer compared the game favorably to Coffee Talk and the Legends & Lattes novels of Travis Baldree. Jamie Moorcroft-Sharp of Destructoid found the gameplay to be satisfying yet shallow, but called the writing and dialogue options "incredible".
