= Ragnarok (manhwa) =

Manhwa

- Cover of the Tokyopop edition of Ragnarok vol. 1 (2002), art by Lee Myung-jin.

라그나로크 RR: Rageunarokeu MR: Ragŭnarok'ŭ
- Genre: Action/adventure; Mythology
- Author: Lee Myung-jin
- Publisher: (South Korea) Daiwon C.I.
- English publisher: (Australia) (New Zealand) Madman Entertainment (Canada) (United States) Tokyopop (Singapore) Chuang Yi
- Other publishers: (Finland) Punainen jättiläinen (Brazil) Conrad Editora (Spain) Ediciones La Cúpula (Italy) Flashbook (Malaysia) Tora Aman (Thailand) Siam Inter Comics (Poland) Kasen
- Demographic: Male
- Magazine: Comic Champ
- Original run: 1998–2001
- Collected volumes: 10

Ragnarok (Korean: 라그나로크) is a manhwa created by Lee Myung-jin and published by Daiwon C.I. in South Korea from 1998 to 2001. There are currently 10 volumes in circulation, which were republished in English in North America by Tokyopop from May 21, 2002, to April 6, 2004.

The series is mainly based on Norse mythology but is influenced by various other cultures. It falls into the genres of fantasy, action and adventure.

This manhwa became the basis of the widely popular Korean MMORPG, Ragnarok Online developed by Gravity Corp, which in turn was the basis for an adaptation into the anime Ragnarok the Animation. Currently, Ragnarok is on indefinite hiatus as Lee Myung-jin is helping with the development of Ragnarok Online.

== Story ==
Ragnarok follows the life and adventures of the warrior Chaos, an amnesiac who cannot remember anything from before the last two years in his life. He resides in the city of Fayon, inhabited by a long lineage of warriors. The newest leader in line to claim the head position of the village is a young woman by the name of Iris Irine, who trains with Chaos, her close friend, to become a suitable leader for her people. Meanwhile, Fenris Fenrir searches for Balder's reincarnation to bring about Ragnarok.

== Characters ==
=== Protagonists ===
- Chaos: A Rune Knight who has lost the memory of his childhood. Chaos came to live in Fayon, a village of great warriors, and became best friends with Iris Irine, the heir to leadership of the village. When Fenris Fenrir arrived in Fayon, Chaos learned that he was the reincarnation of Balder, the God of Light. With his memories starting to return and his powers growing with every battle, Chaos struggles to unravel his past and find his true destiny. Chaos appears to be a newer name than his original in this lifetime. In a flashback, he wears the name tag of "Vermillion", from a dragon knight who found him in a bloody area with slain soldiers and a young girl in his arms. Despite his troubled past, he is a relatively good-natured young man who is somewhat clueless about romantic relationships, particularly with Iris Irine. He also is a very loyal friend, including to the very reticent Loki.
- Fenris Fenrir: The reincarnation of the Wolf God, Fenris has become a powerful warlock upon returning to life began searching the world for Balder, who had also been reborn as a mortal. Fenris wields many forgotten sorceries, as well as the magical demon-slaying staff Laevatein. Notably, she has the curious ability to copy any spell that strikes her. During her journey, she has come to care deeply for Chaos as well as her memory of Balder, and sees Iris Irine as both a friend and a rival for Chaos's affections. She is a dignified and intelligent woman, seen as a big sister by Iris Irine and as an enigma by Chaos.
- Iris Irine: The heir to leadership of Fayon, village of warriors. Iris is a cleric in training and knows many healing spells. She uses Rune Cards (papers that are concealed with magic) inscribed with magical runes to debilitate the enemy and help her allies. Iris has been best friends with Chaos for years and cares about him a great deal (She even calls herself as Chaos' girlfriend sometimes). Though she considers herself dignified and ladylike, she's prone to throwing tantrums and acting childish when she's excited. She admires Fenris greatly and has a running rivalry with the thief Lidia. Currently, her greatest enemy is her half-sister the valkyrie Sara Irine. She wields the magic-destroying sword Chonryongdo, one of three legendary dragon blades. In the English version, there are multiple variations of the spelling of "Chonryongdo" (e.g., Chernryongdo) though none reflect the actual Korean spelling, Hepburn Romanisation suggesting instead Cheongryongdo.
- Loki: The most powerful member of the Assassins' Guild, Loki had never even been wounded twice in combat before encountering Chaos. When the Assassins Guild was almost totally destroyed by Skurai (who had framed the act on Chaos), Loki hunted Chaos down and attacked him. Chaos eventually managed to convince Loki that they were not enemies, and Loki has joined forces with Chaos to hunt down the true culprit. Loki is apparently totally devoid of emotions (though there is some debate on this topic) and has a hard time fathoming them in others. He wields "The Might" ("Cosmic Energy" in the English release), the most powerful form of magic in the world, and has been described as "the one who is human and not".
- Lidia: A thief who travels with a two-tailed cat named Ses. Lidia fancies herself a treasure hunter like her father, and is searching the world over for magical artifacts. Her greatest wish is to find Alfheim, the hidden city of the elves, the one treasure (the treasure of Avariel in the original release) her father could never locate. Lidia started hanging out with Chaos and the gang in order to steal Iris's dagger, Chonryongdo, and later latches on to Loki. She is known as Lidia in the English release.
- Reina (name not stated in the original release): An elfish archer that Chaos and his friends have run into during their time in the city of Geffen. She appears to be the last of her kind and wishes to protect the secret of Alfhiem, the ancient city of the elves. She doesn't like Lidia as she is trying to steal the treasures of Alfhiem but she puts aside her differences with her and Loki during their adventure in Alfhiem while battling a powerful assassin (Juliana Lucille) and wizard (The city Mayor). Since the manhwa has been halted it is unclear what will become of her after her, Lidia, and Loki's adventure.

=== Antagonists ===
- Sara Irine: One of Freyja's twelve Valkyries, an elite warrior who is immensely powerful in both physical strength and magic and wields the legendary Sword of Retribution, Haeryongdo. She is revealed to be Iris's older paternal half-sister, who disappeared from the village 12 years earlier, after believing her father had killed her mother. First seen chasing Fenris Fenrir to Fayon, she takes the opportunity take revenge on Lord Irine and Fayon for the perceived injustice against her and her mother. When she next encounters Iris, she spares her half-sister, apparently out of the desire to kill Iris herself.
- Skurai: The Cursed Prosecutor, who wields the demonic sword Tartanos, a sword that constantly thirst for blood. Directed to Fayon by the Beholders to satiate his bloodlust, he arrives during Sara Irine's attack on the village and begins to slaughter the civilians. He sets his sights on Chaos, believing that Chaos' blood will finally quench Tartanos and free Skurai's soul from the weapon.
- Zenobia Sadi Freile: One of Freyja's twelve Valkyries, a powerful dark elf sorceress who is assisted by the witch Arkana.
- Lisa Kahn Himmelmez: One of Freyja's twelve Valkyries, a necromancer who has vast hordes of undead beasts at her disposal. Her servants include Bijou, a powerful witch with a deformed hand.

=== Other characters ===
- The Beholders: Huginn and Muninn, two mysterious individuals who are able to transform into crows. They are the eyes of Odin, Allfather of the Gods, and are acting to influence events in Midgard. They are the ones who directed Skurai to attack first the village of Fayon, and then the Assassins Guild. They also acted to save both Skurai and Sara Irine from the dragon Nidhogg that Chaos summoned during the battle (by accident due to his flashbacks). Their true motives are a mystery, but Muninn seems to have a more sadistic side than the silent Huginn, who displays occasional compassion, such as when he kills a monster about to devour a child.
- The Nornirs: Urd, the guardian of the past; Verdandi, the observer of the present; and Skuld, the keeper of the future, are the goddesses of destiny and time. The sisters are aware that the seal that holds Ragnarök has been broken and the age of the gods is beginning to end. Skuld appears before Chaos to implore him to bring about Ragnarök, but is unable to complete her message before Freyja appears.
- The Asgard Rangers: A wild band of strangely dressed women who consider themselves to be the champions of truth and justice, but they seem to simply attack targets at random, then declare their victims to be 'unrighteous', justifying their own extreme actions. Their wild poses and wacky antics serve to hide their considerable fighting skills. They seem to be a parody of sentai groups like Sailor Moon and Power Rangers.
- Doyen and Peony Irine: The father and mother of Iris. They both die at the hands of Skurai and Sara Irine. Lady Irine seems to be the brains behind the operation but the Lord is not dumb, just easily blinded by love of his daughter. Lord Irine is also father to Sara, by another mother, who he later kills for unrevealed reasons. Lord Irine's dying request is for Iris not to hate her sister. Lady Irine is implied to have been killed by Skurai in an attempt to protect the children (Nuri and Seri).
- Matthew and the Guards: The accomplished guards of Fayon are led by the massive, if not lovable, Matthew. His hair resembles a rooster's crest, leading Chaos to call him 'chicken head'. He has a blatant infatuation with Iris but never lets it get in the way of duty. The main weapon of the guards is a wall of lethal cannons. These valiant souls go down defending their home. Matthew is made into a zombie by Himmelmez in order to make a foe Chaos would not willingly fight.
- Ses (Sessy) the Cat o' Two Tails: This cat can talk, though Lidia would prefer it could not. He ('she' in the English release) seems to be more reasonable and rational then her owner. According to the Official Player's Handbook found at the start of each volume after the first, she provides a 50% bonus on Pickpocketing Saves. While this is relatively illogical both in wording and use, Ses does seem to do all the work in most of Lidia's criminal escapades.
- The Assassins Guild: This group of Arabic inspired warriors are dedicated to preserving the balance of power within the entire continent and this means favoring good or evil as the balance shifts. The policy does not exactly make them friends with anyone. Most are slaughtered by Skurai. Taulin and a small band of others survive because they accompany Loki to battle Surt's minions. The survivors are eventually stationed at the Guild headquarters to rebuild and recover the heavy losses taken.
- General Karl Johann Spiegal: Commander of the forces of Volsug, he is a competent and good natured man. He is forced to imprison Chaos and his companions but assures them that he trusts them and would support them as a witness. When the forces of Himmelmez attack the city, he takes Fenris and Iris to the fragment of the Heart of Ymir. He becomes critically wounded but is stabilized in time.
- The White and Black Mages: These taciturn characters constantly show up in the background of any major crowd. They are mimics of their namesakes from the Final Fantasy RPG series. They appear to be a tribute to that popular series.
- Angelina Kidman: This spunky young woman is the announcer for the Geffen magic tourney and the prime secretary (as said in the original release) of the Witch Guild. She has a lecherous co-host, Frontain Rod, who is more concerned with the breasts of female competitors.
- Frontain Rod Kimacue: He is the co-host announcer of the Geffen magic tourney, by Angelina's side, and the account manager of the Gravity Research Union (as said in the original release). He is a rather perverted person, who keeps peeking on women's breasts with his binoculars. Although he seems to be only an old perverted man, he has a lot of knowledge about magic and fighting techniques. He recognizes every single move that Fenris uses and is being curious about who Fenris really is.
- Gustav Kube the Magician: A novice magician who explains the city of Geffen to heroes. His character model would later be used as the basis for Mage in Ragnarok Online.

== Additional information ==
This series is supposed to go on for 40+ books, but Lee Myoung-Jin has put it aside to work on artwork for Ragnarok Online instead.

== See also ==
- Ragnarok Online, an MMORPG
- Ragnarok Online 2, a sequel MMORPG
- Gravity Corp.
- Ragnarok the Animation, an anime
