= Turma do Chico Bento (video game) =

2012 video game

- Developer: Insolita Studios
- Publisher: Level Up! Games
- Platform: Internet
- Release: Facebook, Orkut; September 3, 2012
- Genre: Simulation
- Mode: Single-player with multiplayer interaction

Turma do Chico Bento is a farming simulation social network game developed by Insolita Studios in 2012, based on Brazilian Chuck Billy 'n' Folks popular comics characters.

Based in popular farming simulation games like FarmVille, Turma do Chico Bento's first mission is to create a personalized character, who moves to the Zucchini's Village, where players can interact with characters from Chuck Billy 'n' Folks series.
