= IP E-Games =

Video game publisher

IP E-Game Ventures Inc.
- Formerly: IP E-Games
- Company type: Subsidiary
- Industry: Video games
- Founded: November 22, 2005; 20 years ago
- Defunct: April 2, 2012; 14 years ago
- Fate: Merged with Level Up! Games Inc.
- Successor: Level Up! Games Inc.
- Headquarters: 10th Floor, Centerpoint Condominium, Garnet Road corner Julia Vargas Avenue, Ortigas Center, Pasig, Metro Manila, Philippines
- Area served: Philippines
- Parent: IPE Global Holdings Corporation

IP E-Game Ventures Inc., also known as IP E-Games, was an online game publisher based in the Philippines under the IPVG Corporation. In April 2012, IP E-Games ceased all operations in line with their merger into Level Up! Games Inc. The company published online entertainment casual games along with massively multiplayer online role-playing games (MMORPG).

== Titles ==
=== Published titles ===
- Ran Online
- Cabal Online
- Audition Online (as Dance Battle Audition)
- Jade Dynasty (as Zhu Xian Online)
- Runes of Magic
- Point Blank
- Granado Espada
- Bandmaster
- Twelve Sky 2

==== Past titles ====
- Dreamville
- Battle Position
- O2Jam
- Supreme Destiny
- Superstar
- Operation 7
- Dragonica
- Nostale

=== Unpublished titles ===
- Topspeed
