= Ragnarok the Animation =

Japanese-Korean anime television series

- North American cover of the first DVD volume of Ragnarok the Animation
- Genre: Romance, fantasy, MMORPG
- Anime television series
- Directed by: Seiji Kishi; Kim Jung Ryool
- Produced by: Seiichi Hori; Cheong Dae Sik
- Written by: Hideki Mitsui; Lee Myung-jin
- Music by: Noriyuki Asakura
- Studio: G&G Entertainment; Gonzo
- Licensed by: Crunchyroll (Note: In North America through Crunchyroll, LLC (formerly known as Funimation), in the United Kingdom through Crunchyroll UK and Ireland (formerly known as Manga Entertainment) and in Australia through Madman Anime.); SEA: Mighty Media
- Original network: TV Tokyo (Japan); SBS (South Korea)
- Original run: April 6, 2004 – September 28, 2004
- Episodes: 26

Ragnarok the Animation is a Japanese-Korean anime television series based on the MMORPG Ragnarok Online. The story happens in the same world of Rune-Midgard. An evil entity called the Dark Lord wants to create chaos in the world with the help of seven crystals that represent the seven ambitions (also known as the Seven Strengths) who sealed him away years ago.

It was produced in the first quarter of 2004 and was broadcast on TV Tokyo in Japan. In 2005, it was broadcast on SBS in South Korea. It has 26 episodes.

The Philippine and Brazilian distributor of the game, Level Up! Games, Inc., cooperated with ABS-CBN Corporation for local licensing and distribution rights of Ragnarok the Animation. The anime series first premiered in the Philippines on ABS-CBN on October 11, 2004, airing right before TV Patrol. It was the first anime that aired on the network's Primetime Bida evening block.

Funimation Entertainment acquired the U.S. license of Ragnarok in 2007.

== Characters ==
=== Main party ===
Roan (ロアン, Roan)
Voiced by: Daisuke Sakaguchi (Japanese); Greg Ayres (English)
Class: Swordsman / Crusader

The main protagonist, Roan, is a swordsman whose main goal in the anime is to gain power to protect his childhood friend, Yufa. At one point, he believes he has failed in this and goes off alone to get stronger. After a fateful encounter in Byalan, Roan returns to the group as a Crusader, successfully rescuing Yufa. However, as the story progresses, Roan begins to lose sight of his duty. He later realizes his wrong after some advice from the Legendary Witch in Payon and Comodo. However, it was too late as Roan made it only on time to see Yufa leave with her brother. Afterwards, the group heads towards Glast Heim to save Yufa and to stop Dark Lord. On the way, they are confronted by a possessed Yufa who sends a torrent of undead monsters at her friends. After their victory, she teleports them directly to Glast Heim. With the help and sacrifice of the rest of the party, Roan manages to locate Yufa, but he finds her to be unable to truly hear his words. Tricking Roan, Yufa kisses him, slipping a cursed ruby into his mouth, which he then swallows. Upon realizing this, the cursed ruby begins to kill Roan. Unable to draw his sword, Roan allows Yufa to stab him with a cursed blade. Eventually, Yufa breaks free from her mental bonds and frees Roan from the curse she had set on him with a kiss of true love. Then, he, Yufa and the rest of the surviving group reunite to defeat the Dark Lord. In the end, Roan and Yufa were each seen wearing a ring, implying that they are now married.

Yufa (ユーファ, Yūfa)
Voiced by: Nana Mizuki (Japanese); Carrie Savage (English)
Class: Acolyte / Priest

The love interest of Roan, Yufa is an acolyte and Roan's childhood friend. Though she puts on a smile for Roan, it is obvious she is still mourning the loss of her older brother, Keough. When Keough suddenly returns to life as an evil being, she becomes confused and does not know whether or not to fight her brother or protect him. Later, in an effort to save the souls under the control of the Moonlight Flower in Payon, she becomes a Priest. Eventually, Roan's ignorance and arrogance pushes Yufa away and prompts her to leave the group (and Roan) behind for her brother, Keough. Keough eventually corrupts Yufa by removing her soul crystal, something that seems to give her the ability to stay pure, and is also consequently one of the key items of Dark Lord's revival. After stabbing Roan in her corrupt state, Keough comes to her in a vision and tells her that he must leave her, but that Roan would protect her in his absence. This vision broke Dark Lord's corruption, and freed Yufa to allow her to see what she had done. Holding the dying Roan in her arms, Yufa kissed her childhood love at last. This kiss of true love destroyed the cursed ruby ailing Roan, allowing the two to stand together against the Dark Lord. With the help of her friends and Roan, Yufa sealed Dark Lord away with a Magnus Exorcismus spell. At the end of the series, it is implied that Roan and Yufa married.

Takius (タキウス, Takiusu)
Voiced by: Aya Hisakawa (Japanese); Jennifer Seman (English)
Class: Mage / Sage

Takius is a mage who wears a blindfold throughout the series and searches the world for the ultimate truth. Her mission for this "ultimate truth" was put on her by her teacher, Zephyr (who also gave her the blinder). With the blinder and her original staff intact, Zephyr had the ability to control her. After going mad and being recruited by Dark Lord, he uses this ability to manipulate Takius in favor of Dark Lord's plans. Eventually, Takius is able to conquer her internal struggles, breaking free from her ties with him and removing the blinder permanently. To further this transformation she became a Sage, resulting in one final confrontation with the one man she ever loved. During the final battle with Zephyr, her master was betrayed by the Dark Lord, who had been using Zephyr from the beginning. As a result, he falls from a collapsing wall, only to be saved just in time by Takius. However, just then, Zephyr's Lord of Vermillion spell was activated, crushing the platform the two were dangling from and both of them fell. This would not be Takius's last appearance in the anime. The voice of Takius would come to Roan during the final battle, encouraging Roan to fight on for he had lost all hope vaguely implying that Takius has survived the Lord of Vermillion spell Zephyr summoned. Takius's staff would then come crashing down from the air, cancelling the Meteor Storm spell the Dark Lord was using (somehow, the wand seems to contain a Sage class magic called Spellbreaker, which is the reason of the spell cancelling effect). Roan carries out her wand as a memory of her. Her real name is Catherine (キャスリン, Kyasurin), but hates being called that for unknown reasons.

Maya (マーヤ, Māya)
Voiced by: Haruko Momoi (Japanese); Luci Christian (English)
Class: Merchant

Maya is the merchant in the group and usually joins parties to steal loot and make off with their money. Her rather disagreeable way of doing things comes from a tragic event in her childhood where she was abused in her "hometown" of Alberta after trying to sell apples with her self-made cart. She met Roan and Yufa in the Prontera Sewers when they saved her from a large number of Thief Bugs. In return, she saves them by delivering a Blue Potion to Yufa during their fight with a Golden Thief Bug. She later changes her rather roguish ways after becoming attached to Yufa and the rest of the group. She has a known affinity for monsters, never being seen without her pet Poring named Poy-Poy. In Episode 7, she befriends an "Alice" (monster who resembles a human maid) but sadly she meets a tragic end because of the actions of Zealotus (a half monster who despises humans) in Episode 19. In their final confrontation in Comodo, Maya nearly kills Jiltus for revenge but Alice's spirit comes to Maya and convinces her to forgive Zealotus. She then makes peace with Zealotus, but too little too late. Maya only ever uses two skills in the series, Mammonite and Cart Revolution. Maya is the only member of the group to not "advance" to another job. She does, however, throw potions much like an Alchemist.

Judia (ジュディア, Judia)
Voiced by: Minako Arakawa (Japanese); Caitlin Glass (English)
Class: Hunter

Judia is a hunter; her bow skills are not that good at first, but after a chance encounter with Iruga, she improves a great deal. Having bow skills, she can also use the skill "Double Strafe". She can also read tarot cards. She falls in love with Iruga and comes to understand what he is trying to do in fighting Keough as he is. When she teams up with Roan's group, she gets jealous after Yufa holds his hand and keeps calling him "Big Brother Iruga". By the end of the anime, she has Iruga's child which was the product of giving her life force to Iruga when he was injured with a sword which is enchanted with poison (can be seen in the end of episode 17 and the beginning of episode 18). In the Japanese version she speaks with a Kansai accent; in the Philippine version she speaks in the Bisaya accent, while in English version she speaks Southern American or Texas English.

Iruga Alam (イルガ・アラム, Iruga Aramu)
Voiced by: Kazuya Nakai (Japanese); Charles Baker (English)
Class: Assassin

Like Yufa is childhood friends with Roan, Iruga is childhood friends with Keough and is an assassin. After witnessing his friend "die" in Glast Heim, Iruga decided to protect both Yufa and Roan in Keough's memory. Later on in his travels, he meets an amateur female hunter by the name of Judia. After saving her from a couple of bandits, they become companions (or rather she just follows him). When Iruga finds out Keough is alive and now working for evil, he fights his former friend in an effort to bring the real Keough back. During one confrontation, he becomes gravely injured, and is forced to battle Keough in a weakened state numerous times. In the final battle in Glast Heim, Iruga and Keough fatally struck each other at the same time, but Iruga managed to stab Keough's wound, freeing his friend's heart from the evil the Dark Lord placed in it. Within the process, Keough dies with Iruga.

=== Secondary characters ===
Poi Poi (ポイポイ, Poi Poi)
Voiced by: Fujiko Takimoto (Japanese); Majken Bullard (English)

A pink ball-shaped creature that Maya has as a pet.

Keough (キーオ, Kīo)
Voiced by: Takehito Koyasu (Japanese); Robert McCollum (English)

Yufa's elder brother, a knight, and currently a subordinate of the Dark Lord. Keough is childhood friends with Iruga and accompanied him to investigate Glast Heim. The ruins proved to be too much for the group and forced them to flee, but their escape route was blocked by an Abysmal Knight. Despite Iruga's protests, Keough distracted the knight as Iruga got Roan and Yufa out. Before Iruga could make it back Keough was stabbed and the doors of Glast Heim closed. In the beginning it is assumed he died, but the group later learns that he was brainwashed and corrupted by the Dark Lord. Keough's stab wound was made by a "Blade Lost in Darkness", which would become symbolic to what he had become. His main purpose would be to lure Yufa to join the dark side, for she was holding a soul crystal vital for Dark Lord's revival. Merely seconds from death, Keough reforms and apologizes to Iruga for everything. His soul later appears in Yufa's dream sequence telling her not to choose the path he had taken, and to follow Roan for he would protect her. Iruga nicknames him Haze (ヘイズ, Heizu) after he turns to the dark side.

Zealotus (ジルタス, Jirutasu; also Jiltus)
Voiced by: Mariko Suzuki (Japanese); Colleen Clinkenbeard (English)

Zealotus is the offspring of a monster father and a human mother. Because of the prejudice of her monster half, Zealotus and her mother were forced to leave their village. The cruelty of the villagers left a deep hatred of humans in Zealotus' heart. After her mother's death, Zealotus lived among the monsters and became a cruel being. A chance encounter with Baphomet made her rethink her lifestyle until she is approached by Dark Lord to serve him. She was first seen in Prontera Sewers, manipulating the actions of the Golden Thief Bug. During the anime, she has a particular dislike for Maya because of Maya's love for monsters and relationship with Alice. They eventually resolve their differences. In the end, she sacrifice her life to protect Maya as a sign of their friendship. Her spirit would appear before Maya during the final battle and instruct her on how to defeat the Dark Lord. Zealotus is an actual monster in the game.

Zephyr (ゼフェル, Zeferu)
Voiced by: Nachi Nozawa (Japanese); Mark Stoddard (English)

Zephyr is a wizard and Takius's teacher. He possesses similar characteristics to The Joker. He has a high-pitched laugh and does some very goofy antics throughout the anime, from laughing for no apparent reason, to fighting Roan with a candy cane. However, all that cannot seem to hide his incredible power, knowledge of magic, and his utter insanity. Zephyr once had a family, but they had lost their lives due to a failed experiment of his. Coupled with the ridicule of the public, Zephyr was driven insane to the point where he could be easily manipulated by the Dark Lord. The anime is vague on whether he went insane during teaching Takius or after. He is eventually saved by his former pupil, but too late for both of them. In the anime, Zephyr was the only character to have attained an "aura" which signifies the ultimate power he has gained through mercilessly killing hundreds of monsters and people (in Ragnarok Online it instead represents reaching level 99).

Dark Lord (ダークロード, Dāku Rōdo)
Voiced by: Yosuke Akimoto (Japanese); R. Bruce Elliott (English)

The main antagonist of the series, the Dark Lord is the greatest representation of evil within Rune-Midgard. He shows a noticeable superiority to all other monsters in the anime, and proves to be the world's greatest threat, despite being sealed away long ago by the "Seven Ambitions". He is cunning and devious, and manages to convince three of the seven souls he needs to be revived to work for him. From several scenes, it seems that the Dark Lord consists of two identities, both being equally evil. There is no apparent difference between the two identities, seemingly only shown to explain the different voices of this villain. Dark Lord is an actual MVP (boss) in Ragnarok Online.

Baphomet (バフォメット, Bafometto)
Voiced by: Mugihito (Japanese); Cole Brown (English)

A towering, horned goat-like being who is the first to best the entire group of protagonists, possessing immense power, but obviously not fighting to the fullest in his fights (and often toying with his opponents). Though considered evil at first, he shows mercy by sparing the group and then respect when Judia rescues his son. It seems the Baphomet was one of the greatest beings preventing Dark Lord's revitalization, though he never directly interferes until the end. It is unknown whether or not Baphomet is stronger than the Dark Lord. At one point in the series it is revealed that Baphomet is concerned for the "balance of good and evil" which could explain why he opposes Dark Lord while being the evil himself. His weapon is a large hammer in the anime, while in the game he uses a purple scythe. Baphomet is an actual MVP (boss) in the game.

Melopsum (メロプシュム, Meropushumu)
Voiced by: Rumi Ochiai (Japanese); Christine Auten (English)

A shapeshifting witch who was responsible for a tragedy at Comodo many years ago (although it has been implied that it was just a misinterpreted tale). She seems to be associated with Baphomet, but is a largely mysterious character. She has a particular interest in Roan. She first changed into a Crusader in Izlude Island and saves Roan and convinces him to become a Crusader. Then she changes into an Archer in Payon to teach him the true path that power is not everything and finally a Monk when Roan is trapped in a cave near Comodo, teaching him not to use the sword arrogantly and that pure strength is not enough. In her last appearance to Roan, she (and two dancers indirectly) teach Roan to tell the enemy moves and gives him a sword that was used to seal herself away, entrusting him to use it to protect those he loved.

== In-game events ==
Japan, Indonesia, and Philippines have held some sort of in-game events to commemorate the release of the anime. On jRO, players could speak to an NPC in Comodo then carry out quests paralleling the anime, while two characters modeled after Roan and Yufa roamed around Prontera while being controlled by their respective voice actor on pRO. In idRO, there are NPCs with appearance similar to the anime's main characters, located in Alberta, that will give questions during a weekly event right after the current anime episode ends, based on what happened in the episode.

== Episode list ==
No.	Title	Original release date
1	"Why Do You Wield That Sword?" "Sono Ken wa Nani no Tame ni Aru no desu" (その剣は何のためにあるのです)	April 6, 2004
Roan and Yufa enter Rune-Midgard's capital on the beginning of their adventures. After doing a bit of shopping, they wonder around and get lost. In a back alley they stumble upon 3 bandits accosting a lady mage. They help the mage and scare the bandits away. The mage Takius eats with the 2 adventurers and they discuss the growing evil in the land. The boss of the bandits summon a powerful monster to get back at them from their earlier defeat. They fight the monster.
2	"Be Good To Me, Big Brother" "Yoroshiku ne, Oniichan" (よろしくね、お兄ちゃん)	April 13, 2004
3	"I Believe" "Watashi wa Shinjitemasu" (私は信じてます)	April 20, 2004
4	"Is That the Best You Can Do?" "Sore wa Omae no Chikara nano ka" (それはお前の力なのか)	April 27, 2004
5	"What Did You Just Say?" "Ima, Nante Itta no?" (今、なんていったの?)	May 4, 2004
6	"I Won't Let Anyone Get In My Way!" "Tare ni mo Watashi no Jama wa Sasenain dakara" (誰にも私の邪魔はさせないんだから)	May 11, 2004
7	"Will You Comfort Me?!?" "Nagusamete Kureru no!?" (なぐさめてくれるの!?)	May 18, 2004
8	"Life Is Precious" "Inochi no Tattosa o Shiranu Mono wa Fukō da" (命の尊さを知らぬものは不幸だ)	May 25, 2004
9	"All For the Truth" "Subete wa Shinri no Tame ni" (全ては真理のために)	June 1, 2004
10	"You're My Brother, Aren't You?!?" "niisan Nan desho!" (兄さんなんでしょ!)	June 8, 2004
11	"All is Only Despair" "Kono Yo ni Aru-no wa Shitsubō Dake da" (この世にあるのは失望だけだ)	June 15, 2004
12	"I Can't Do It" "Boku ja Dame Nan da…" (僕じゃダメなんだ…)	June 22, 2004
13	"The Protector" "Mamoru Mono…" (守る者…)	June 29, 2004
14	"Why Won't You Answer?" "Dōshite Kotaete Kudasaranai no desu" (どうして答えてくださらないのです)	July 6, 2004
15	"Don't Worry, I'm Here" "Daijōbu, Ore ga Iru" (大丈夫、俺がいる)	July 13, 2004
16	"I Can't Save Anyone" "Nani mo Sukuenai…" (何も救えない…)	July 20, 2004
17	"You Are Already Tainted" "Sude ni Omae mo Kagarete Iru" (すでにお前も汚れている)	July 27, 2004
18	"I've Known All Along" "Minna Wakatta n'ya" (みんなわかってたんや)	August 3, 2004
19	"We'll Always Be Together" "Zutto Issho da yo" (ずっといっしょだよ)	August 10, 2004
20	"It's Okay" "Mō, Ii ya…" (もう、いいや…)	August 17, 2004
21	"I Need You" "Omae ga Hitsuyō Nan da" (お前が必要なんだ)	August 24, 2004
22	"Who's the Lonely One?" "Samishii-no wa Dotchi!" (寂しいのはどっち!)	August 31, 2004
23	"Good Bye" "Sayonara…" (さよなら…)	September 7, 2004
24	"Place of Reckoning" "Subete no Ketchaku o Tsukeru Basho" (全ての決着をつける場所)	September 14, 2004
25	"One Who Realizes His Mistake" "Ayamachi ni Kizuki-shi Mono" (過ちに気付きし者)	September 21, 2004
26	"For the Sake of Our Future" "Watashi-tachi no Mirai no Tame ni!" (私達の未来のために!)	September 28, 2004

== See also ==
- Ragnarok Online, an MMORPG
- Ragnarok, a manhwa
