= Lee Myung-jin =

South Korean manhwa artist

Lee Myung-jin 이명진
- Born: April 12, 1974 (age 52)
- Area: Artist
- Notable works: Ragnarok

- Lee Myung-jin
- Hangul: 이명진
- RR: I Myeongjin
- MR: I Myŏngjin

Lee Myung-jin (Korean: 이명진; born 1974) is a South Korean manhwa author and artist. His work Ragnarok was adapted into the game Ragnarok Online by Gravity Corp. This game was later turned into an anime.

== History ==
Lee was born in South Korea in 1974 and graduated from Holy Child Catholic School in Seoul with a degree in Visual Design. In 1992 he began work on his first manhwa series, An Evening When Something Good is About To Happen (어쩐지 좋은 일이 생길 것 같은 저녁), which ran for four years (nine volumes) and won him the distinguished Champ Super Manhwa award from Super Champ, South Korea's top manhwa publisher. In the Americas, the series was instead called Lights Out.

In August 1995, he put his artistic career on hold to serve his mandatory two years in the South Korean military. Upon his return, he formed his studio Dive to Dream Sea and began work on Ragnarok (for Boy Champ), one of the top-selling manhwa of all time. Expanding upon his epic fantasy, Lee has also become involved in the creation of Ragnarok Online, a game that takes the RPG analogies and rules of his manhwa series to the next level. With concepts taken from his own series, there are multiple players, worlds, and enemies to control, attack, and rule, with character designs and scenes somewhat reminiscent of Final Fantasy. The game is in its finished form and has been distributed in over 100 countries by South Korean online game makers Gravity Corp.

In 2004, Ragnarok achieved a new milestone, becoming the first South Korean manhwa to inspire a Japanese anime series. Based on the character designs and sensibilities of the online game, Ragnarok the Animation was given a 26-episode series that was broadcast on TV Tokyo.

Lee's studio, Dive to Dream Sea, also created the two-volume indie comics comedy manhwa Laya, the Witch of Red Pooh. Lee also produced a one volume manhwa named Genocide.

== Works ==
Name	Year	Notes	Ref
Lights Out	1992	Serialized in Boy Champ in 1992	
Genocider	1995	Three-part short story serialized in issues 27, 28, and 29 of Boys Champ in 1995	
Ragnarok	1998	Serialized in Boy Champ	
Ragnarok Online	2002	Artist	
Soul Ark	2017	Korean webtoon serialized on KakaoPage	
