= RF Online =

2004 video game

Rising Force Online
- Developer: CCR
- Publishers: CCR International; Codemasters; Lyto; RedFox Games; PlayPark; Sega
- Platform: Microsoft Windows
- Release: KOR: August, 2004; NA/UK: February 21, 2006; EU: February 24, 2006
- Genre: Science fiction/fantasy MMORPG
- Mode: Multiplayer

RF Online, originally named 'Rising Force', (Korean: 라이징 포스) is a 3D MMORPG developed by CCR. The first version of the game was released in South Korea and was later followed by Chinese (Mandarin), Japanese, Indonesian, Portuguese and English translations. The North American/European version of the game launched its retail phase on February 21, 2006. A mixture of science fiction and classic fantasy, RF Online is set in a distant planet in the Novus system where magic exists alongside high technology. Like most MMORPGs, it follows the typical fantasy setting complete with swords and sorcery, but it also emphasizes the three-way Race vs. Race vs. Race (RvRvR) concept and modern/futuristic technology such as mecha and nuclear weapons.

The NA/EU game service was brought down as of November 9, 2008, due to licence expiration. However, the developers, CCR have started to relaunch the game hosting it themselves for NA/EU. In August 2012, RF Online was confirmed to relaunch stateside via the publisher GamesCampus. RFO is a free-to-play game. RF Online version 1.5 launched via the publisher GamesCampus Europe in April 2013. RF Online version 1.5 launched via the publisher GamesCampus Europe in January 2015.

On April 18, 2016, it was revealed CCR filed a trademark for "RF 2", and listing it as a “downloadable software” for various platforms, including virtual reality.

In November 2017, Playpark a subsidiary of Asiasoft announced that they will relaunch the game in the Philippines.

Playpark RF Online is currently owned by RebellionGamingInc.

In September 2020, Netmarble acquired the rights for RF Online and announced that development of a Mobile version of the game would be started soon.

== Gameplay ==
As with many MMORPGs, the player will select one race and fight monsters to gain experience points. RFO is populated with many different monsters across many areas. At the start of the game, a character will be led through an in-game guide of the basic commands for the game. From there, the character will be exposed to a series of quests which will familiarize him/her with their character's headquarters. As the character progresses in level, his/her quests may take them out to aggressive maps, where he/she will be exposed to the player killing Features of the game. One quest given in the Sette Desert on low levels makes players aware of constant presence and danger of enemy races.

== Political Factions ==
There are 3 character races which the player can choose: Bellato Union, Holy Alliance Cora, and Accretian Empire. Each having a unique race specialty. Every race has their own special subclasses of characters to play based on warrior, ranger, specialist and each race's special classes. The Accretian Empire relies heavily on technology, so they lack access to magic. The Holy Alliance of Cora uses both magic and technology, but relies more on offensive magic. The Bellato Union uses both magic and technology but relies more on technology for offense and uses magic more on support. Class advancements become available at level 30 and 40. It is also possible to cross-class a character within the races for a wide variety of options.

== Economy ==
The game's economy can be divided into two parts-production and consumption. The mine is a new field where resources are produced as a part of and in support of economic activity. Mining for minerals and processing the products of these produce many kinds of items. These form the basis for conflict within the mines.

=== Chip War ===
The battle for resources is actualized in an all-out war among the three races, termed as Chip War. Chip War happens three times in a day, where the winning race obtains the right to control the guardian of the mines — the dreaded Holystone Keeper. The war is led by the respective racial leaders called Archon, whose goal is to break at least one control chip owned by the opposing race.

== PVP ==
Unlike most MMORPGs, RF Online revolves around PvP (Player vs Player). Only the racial headquarters, and select portal locations, are considered as safe areas from enemy races. Player killing comes into play because of the battle for resources between the three races. By default, opposing races members may engage in combat at any point in time on aggressive maps. Same race players may not engage in combat, unless by virtue of an item called the Chaos Potion, or during a special in-race competition called the Guild Circle Zone Scramble, also known as Guild Wars.
