= Requiem: Memento Mori =

- Developers: Gravity, Gravity Interactive, Inc.
- Publisher: Gravity
- Engine: Gamebryo Physics - Havok
- Platform: Microsoft Windows
- Release: KOR: 2007-08-31; NA: 2008-06-19
- Genre: MMORPG
- Mode: Multiplayer

Requiem: Memento Mori is a free-to-play horror-themed massively multiplayer online role-playing game developed and published by Gravity in 2008.

== Release ==
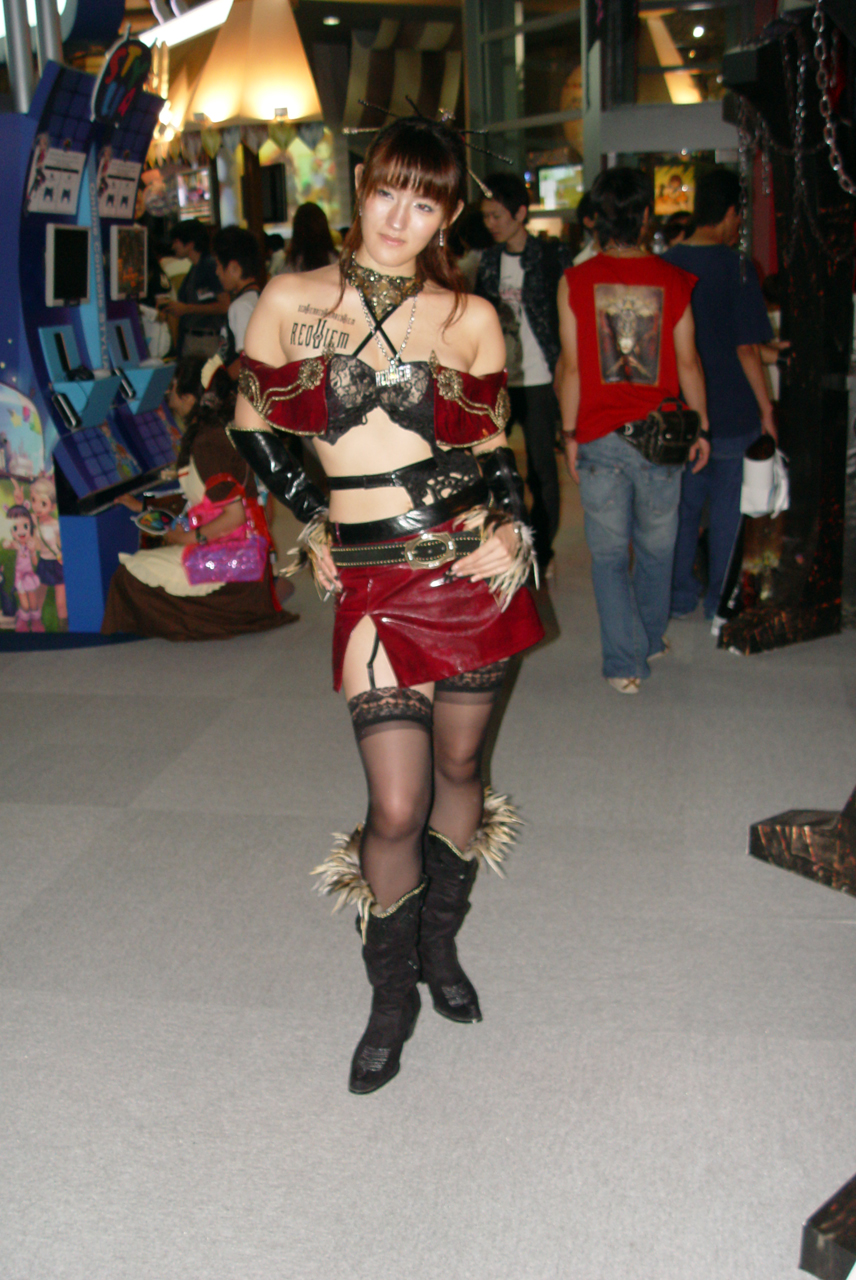
Promotion at the Tokyo Game Show 2005

The North American site officially launched on February 26, 2008. FilePlanet began offering Closed Beta account keys for the NA/International Server on February 26, 2008, with MMORPG.com and MMOSITE.com set to offer beta keys on Friday, February 29. Closed Beta ended on April 17, 2008. It was extended from March 24.

The Open Beta phase started on May 15, 2008 and ended as of June 12, 2008. Pre-release started on June 16 for those who had purchased a subscription.

Requiem: Bloodymare was released on June 19, 2008. Requiem: Memento Mori/Alive was released on September 25, 2009. The game's official title has switched from Requiem: Bloodymare to Requiem: Memento Mori (USA) and Requiem: Alive (Korean).

Gravity Interactive (USA) acquired the rights and took over development from the Gravity (Korea) Requiem Development Studio in November 2013. An announcement was posted to the official North American web site on 11/13/2013.

With the first significant update from the new development team at Gravity Interactive the game was given a new season subtitle and was released as: Requiem: Rise of the Reaver which launched on February 20, 2013.

The first significant update from the new development team at Gravity Interactive, titled "Daughters of the Frost Blade", was announced on 2/19/2014 at the official web site. The "Daughters of the Frost Blade" Update included:

- (1) New Story Quests and a New Daily Quest Hub with numerous New Daily Quests
- (2) New World Boss: Queen of the Frost Blade Clan, Wintriness
- (3) New Accessories aimed at levels 87 and higher
- (4) New Xeons (in game crafting system components)
- (5) New Compounding Recipes (in game crafting system formulas)

The following significant update from the new development team at Gravity Interactive, titled "Rage of Voxyon", was announced on 8/18/2014 at the official web site. The "Rage of Voxyon" Update included:

- (1) New Raid:Voxyon's Lair
- (2) New Raid Boss: Voxyon
- (3) Voxyon's dropable loot includes new Level 90 Armor Sets
- (4) New Quest Hub: Numaren Xenon Outpost includes New Story Quests for Level 70+ and New Daily Quests for Level 70+
- (5) New Enchantment Xeons and New Compounding Recipes for Enchantment Xeons (for in game crafting system formulas)
- (6) Upgraded Mercenaries (summoned NPC ally system) with Temperion Models now vastly stronger and some will have gained new abilities
- (7) Field Boss Wintriness now has a chance to drop Frozen Compression Tokens (for in game crafting system formulas)
- (8) Various Bug Fixes for content released since the "Daughters of the Frost Blade" update

== Reception ==
Requiem: Bloodymare received a 3 out of 5 from X-Play, 70% from GamesRadar, and 3 out of 5 from MMOHuts.
