= Perfect World (video game) =

- Developer: Beijing Perfect World
- Publishers: CHN: Beijing Perfect World; EU: Games-Masters Ltd.; NA: Arc Games; RU: Astrum Entertainment; BR: Level Up! Games
- Platform: Windows
- Release: CHN: January 2006; EU: 2008; NA: September 2, 2008; RU: May 19, 2008; BR: May 19, 2008
- Genre: MMORPG
- Mode: MMO

Perfect World (Chinese: 完美世界, commonly abbreviated as PW and W2), is a 3D adventure and fantasy MMORPG with traditional Chinese settings. Players can take on various roles depending on choice of race and choice of class within that race.

Perfect World International (or PWI) is its more recent rebrand.

Characters develop skills over time with experience and level up via questing rewards and can use and upgrade physical and magical weapons, and team up with other players to fight against monsters in instances, bosses on the open world as well as other players. Very often, people will sell their accounts which saves buying the items from the in game cash shop, farming experience and gaining the skills needed. However, it is prohibited by the game rules, so the account has risks to be blocked.

Each player can join a guild (if accepted) and thereby be part of a 200 maximum player base with common goals to achieve. The PW map is broken into a large number of territories which gives guilds an option to conquer and govern such territories via Territory War for reward of ownership usually in the form of coins which are used back to benefit the guild and its players.

Territory War is 80 players VS 80 players, strategic battle which has a 3-hour maximum time cap with each class belonging to a race having unique roles to perform and teamwork and strategy is key to sustain victory. On the US version of PW, Territory War time cap was reduced to 1 hour 40 minutes due to the low player base numbers and low number of players attending. Currently, there is no real emphasis from the player base towards participating in Territory War due to useless rewards. Certain factions still choose to attend however, but most of the fights are completed in 15/20 mins due to other factions not being interested. Twilight Temple and Dawnglory servers currently have the most competitive Territory War seasons followed by Tideswell and then Etherblade server, which the latter has only had 1 faction intent on winning Territory Wars over the past few seasons.

Perfect World is heavily based on Chinese mythology and is set in the mythical world of Pangu. It was launched in January 2006.

Following its acquisition in April 2022, the North American branch of Perfect World Entertainment was rebranded as Gearbox Publishing San Francisco, with the naming to be applied retroactively to past games published under Perfect World.

== Expansions ==
PWI has several expansions:

1. The Lost Empire in December 2008
2. Age of Spirits in May 2009
3. Rising Tide in December 2009
4. Genesis in March 2011
5. Descent in February 2012
6. Sirens of War in November 2012
7. New Horizons in December 2013
8. Eclipse in December 2014
9. War Front in November 2015
10. Elysium in April 2016
11. Neverfall in April 2017
12. Wonderland in January 2018
13. Redemption in September 2018
14. Wings of Rebirth in May 2019
15. Northern Realms in June 2020
16. Dawnlight in June 2021
17. The Wildwalker in November 2021
18. Fountain of Fate in August 2022
19. Divine Fury in May 2023
20. Seal the Sky in November 2023
21. Song of the Surging Waves in December 2024

== Boutique ==
While Perfect World states it is free-to-play, substantial amounts of money are needed to get a leg up on competition and compete. The game relies on items sold in an in-game cash shop to make profit. Use of the cash shop is optional, but most items purchased there are required to improve a player's gameplay, while few items have purely cosmetic functions.

Currency used in the cash shop can be bought from the respective websites of each company running a version of the game. Alternatively, cash shop currency can be bought in the auction house from other players in exchange for in-game currency.

Perfect World International offers pre-charged cards that can be bought from 7-Eleven, Target, and GameStop locations. The Malaysian version allows a player to "Top Up" via CubiCards. Players may also use other payment forms such as Ultimate Game Cards to purchase cash shop currency by using the PayByCash option.

=== Phone Lock System ===
As a prevention system against account hackers, Perfect World has a Phone Lock feature for those who wish to use it. The Phone Lock, when activated, will freeze an account until the player of that account dials in using the registered phone number. Once the number is recognized, the account is temporarily activated for login. The player must login within 10 minutes of activation before the account login is frozen again. The player may continue to play despite the freeze. If the player logs out after the 10 minutes are up, that player must once again dial in to temporarily deactivate the Phone Lock. The phone lock feature is exclusive to the Chinese Malaysian version of the game.

== See also ==
- List of free MMOGs
- Perfect World (company)
