= Coffee Talk Tokyo =

2026 visual novel

- Developers: Toge Productions; Chorus Worldwide
- Publisher: Chorus Worldwide
- Writer: Anna Winterstein
- Composer: Andrew Jeremy
- Platforms: Nintendo Switch; Nintendo Switch 2; PlayStation 5; Windows; Xbox Series X/S
- Release: 21 May 2026
- Genre: Visual novel
- Mode: Single-player

Coffee Talk Tokyo is a 2026 visual novel developed by Toge Productions and Chorus Worldwide. The game was published by Chorus Worldwide on 21 May 2026 for Nintendo Switch, Nintendo Switch 2, PlayStation 5, Windows and Xbox Series X/S. It is a spin-off to Coffee Talk and Coffee Talk Episode 2: Hibiscus & Butterfly.

The visual novel is set in Tokyo in 2026, whereas previous Coffee Talk games are set in Seattle. The game follows a late-night cafe owner who serves various humans and yōkai that share their life stories and resolve conflicts through conversations in the cafe. The game was first announced in August 2024 for a 2025 release, but was delayed to 21 May 2026. Coffee Talk Tokyo, which incorporates social issues in its dialogue such as overwork culture, received positive reception for its pixel art and soundtrack.

== Gameplay ==
Coffee Talk Tokyo is a linear narrative visual novel. The player controls the owner of Coffee Talk, a late-night coffee shop. The player serves customers in the front bar and follows with the owner's conversations with patrons. To brew a drink, the player chooses three ingredients in a specific order; the drink's texture and flavor are indicated before brewing. The player can also serve a drink hot or cold. Some brews allow creating latte art through etching or stencil templates. Coffee Talk Tokyo is structured into fifteen in-game nights that each serves as one chapter. The player can dispose a drink up to five times per night. They also have a recipe book app with drinks that can be unlocked. The game also has Challenge and Free Brew modes independent of the game's plot. The Free Brew mode allows players to receive orders indefinitely. In the Challenge mode, the player has to accurately serve as much drinks as possible within a set time limit..

The game features Tomodachill, an in-game social networking app containing customers' details and hints for brewing drinks. The player can unlock further character information in Tomodachill after accurately serving their orders. Failing to serve the correct drink will only change the dialogue with patrons. The player can encounter additional dialogue or multiple endings for characters based on the orders' accuracies and engagements in Tomodachill. A fictional newspaper headline is shown between each night to establish the game's setting. The game features an autoplay and a fast-forward feature for dialogue. They can also reread dialogue in a chat log or change the soundtrack currently playing. The player can replay a night and manually save progress; a save data can only be used by restarting the game.

== Plot ==
The game is set in Tokyo from 30 July to 15 August 2026. A coffee shop owner (Note: The player provides the name of the shop owner.) manages their cafe with an assistant Vin, who is recovering from a traumatic accident and has prosthetics that are gradually failing. The shop encounters several customers within fifteen days who discuss their situations in life. The customers include the following: Jun, a popular singer-songwriter whose recent album flopped; Ayame, a teenage ghost trapped between the afterlife and Earth with no memory of her prior life with unresolved business; Blue, a convenience store worker; Kenji, a kappa and a retired salaryman with a conflict with his son; Hendry, a feline music manager from Seattle with a daughter Rachel; and Yuki, a yuki-onna who runs a neighborhood restaurant.

== Development and release ==
Coffee Talk Tokyo was developed by Toge Productions and Chorus Worldwide. It is a standalone game and a spinoff to Coffee Talk and Coffee Talk Episode 2: Hibiscus & Butterfly. The setting was moved to Tokyo from Seattle as "a large part" of the development team are Japanese or familiar with Japanese culture. The change of setting also justified the game as a spin-off and allowed more sources of inspiration such as having yōkai as the characters, according to lead writer Anna Winterstein. The Tomodachill feature was loosely inspired from the gameplay of Her Story, where choosing the right keyword leads to further content.

The game was first announced in August 2024 at a Nintendo Indie World Showcase video for a 2025 release. Development of the game was confirmed in the Southeast Asian Games Showcase in June 2025. It was planned for release on Nintendo Switch, Nintendo Switch 2, PlayStation 5, Windows and Xbox Series X/S, on 5 March 2026, but was delayed to 21 May. Chorus Worldwide also published a digital collector's edition that contains a ten-track album, an in-game art book, and an additional prologue.

== Reception ==
Reception

Aggregate score
Aggregator	Score
OpenCritic	81% recommend (Note: Based on 40 reviews)

Review scores
Publication	Score
Nintendo Life	8/10
Nintendo World Report	8/10
RPGFan	91/100

Several reviewers gave positive reception for the game's pixel art and soundtrack. Ethan Zack of Nintendo Life has described the characters' emotes as "expressive". Moreover, the pixelated artstyle was "bright and colorful without being garish" for a Dot Esports review. Some reviewers also complimented the game's lo-fi music and ambience of rain, or described the art work as an improvement from Coffee Talk and the soundtrack as inspired from classical music.

Ethan Zack of Nintendo Life acknowledged the game's replayability supported by alternate outcomes and the Endless game modes. On the other hand, both Jenni Lada of Siliconera and Alexa Orona of Nintendo World Report has noted that this game has essentially the same experience and gameplay mechanics as previous Coffee Talk games. Several reviews estimated that a first playthrough would last around 8 to 9 hours, and a completionist play for at least 20 hours.

The Verge's Andrew Webster commented that the gameplay aspect of brewing drinks allows experimentation, and that the vagueness of the customers' orders makes accurately completing their order more satisfying. Several reviewers criticized that the game lacks a tutorial for brewing, which could affect the shop owner's dialogue. Attaining specific endings was difficult for TheGamer's Ryan Thompson-Barney, as the game does not explicitly state whether an order is accurately followed. They also found the dialogue unrealistic, as the characters speak "too articulately [...] for a flying visit" and their conflict is quickly resolved through a soft lecture. Several reviewers noted that the topics mentioned in Coffee Talk Tokyo include grieving a loved one's death, intergenerational differences, and being in a closeted same-sex relationship. The game also discusses overwork in the Japanese context. Rock Paper Shotgun's Ashley Schofield argues that the game applies the Cool Japan strategy presents an "idealistic, surface-level view" of the country by excluding the core issues of its overwork culture in the dialogue or only mentioning several topics such as the popularity of Shintoism and age demographics in the fictional newspaper's headlines.
