= Crossfire (2007 video game) =

South Korean first-person shooter game

- Developer: Smilegate Entertainment
- Publisher: Smilegate: CHN: Tencent
- Series: Crossfire
- Platform: Microsoft Windows
- Release: KOR: June 3, 2007; CHN: August 28, 2008; NA: January 30, 2009; PHL: January 30, 2009; INA: August 31, 2009; RU: June 2, 2010; EU: November 7, 2011
- Genres: First-person shooter, tactical shooter
- Mode: Multiplayer

Crossfire (Korean: 크로스파이어) is an online tactical first-person shooter game developed by Smilegate Entertainment for Microsoft Windows. It was first released in South Korea on May 3, 2007.

Due to its popularity in Asia, especially China and South Korea, it has become one of the world's most-played video games by player count, with a lifetime total of 1 billion users in 80 countries worldwide. It was the world's top-grossing online game as of 2014, and went on to become one of the highest-grossing video games of all time, having grossed $6.8 billion in lifetime revenue as of 2017.

The game has spawned a media franchise. A film adaptation of the game was announced in October 2015. A Chinese streaming television series based on the game named Crossfire (穿越火线) premiered in July 2020 and was a commercial success with more than 1.7 billion views in China as of October 2020. The game was also adapted as part of the animated anthology series Secret Level, released on December 10, 2024. A sequel Crossfire 2 is currently in development.

== Gameplay ==
A mission success screen on a team deathmatch mode, the player holding an M16(A2)

Crossfire is a free-to-play first-person shooter that features two mercenary corporations, the "Black List" and "Global Risk", fighting each other in a global conflict. Players assume the role of either a Black List or Global Risk mercenary, joining an online team that works together to complete objective-based scenarios. Except for the Mutation and Wave modes, each mode can support a maximum of 16 players, each divided into an 8-person team.

Players progress and eventually are promoted through various military ranks, beginning at trainee, with the highest being Marshall. Players can also customize their character's equipment and appearance through in-game items.

Crossfire has a free currency which is called "Game Points" (GP), which is earned through playing and completing matches, buying premium items that grant bonus GP, or fulfilling certain missions. Premium and special items like modified weapons can only be bought using monetary currencies. The content tends to vary from version to version.

=== Weapons ===
Crossfire weapons are based on real-life models, with each weapon belonging to a category. Categories include machine guns, assault rifles and sniper rifles. Each category is functionally similar to their real world counterparts (E.g. Machine guns are heavy, powerful, lay down heavy fire but have long reload times and slow mobility, Submachine guns are lighter and have a faster rate of fire but deal less damage, Shotguns are effective in close range but useless at long distance.) Weapons often have many variants, including different skins which give them different attributes. In addition, the re-skinned versions are often rarer. There are also some weapons which are different from others like the VIP weapons, which have better stats like faster reload, among others. Certain modes have mode-exclusive weapons.

== Characters ==
Characters are the avatar of players and are what they will look like to other players while playing the game. While all characters are visually unique from each other, most are functionally the same with no real advantages or disadvantages. There are however a few limited-edition characters who are, for example, able to see better through smoke or reduce the visual incapacitating effects of flash bang grenades.

The characters featured in Crossfire are a combination of both real and fictional Special Forces groups. The real groups featured are: The Russian OMON, the LAPD SWAT, the British SAS and SBS, the Brazilian BOPE, the German GSG 9, the Korean 707th Special Mission Group, the United Nations Special Forces, and the American Navy SEALs. Each character also has both a Black List and Global Risk variant. Some characters are bought with GP, while some are bought with premium currency. There are special characters found in some modes like the knight.

There are also mutant characters for the Mutation/Hero modes, which unlike regular game characters, each have unique abilities.

== Regional availability ==
Region	Publisher	Release date	Closure date	Status	Notes
South Korea	Smilegate (previously Pmang)	May 3, 2007 (Pmang's first launch); December 12, 2013 (Smilegate's relaunch)	July 11, 2012 (previous publisher); March 3, 2020(relaunch)	Closed	—
Japan	Playgra (previously Arario)	February 23, 2008	March 31, 2018	Closed	—
Vietnam	VTC Online (previously VTC Game)	March 18, 2008	—	Active	—
China	Tencent	April 28, 2008	—	Active	—
West	Smilegate West (previously G4Box)	January 30, 2009 (North America)	—	Active	Merger of the North America, Europe and Latin America servers
Philippines	STOVE (previously Gameclub)	January 30, 2009	—	Active	—
Indonesia	Lyto	December 8, 2009	December 21, 2020	Closed	—
Russia	Mail.Ru	June 2, 2010	February 20, 2023	Closed	—
Taiwan	Macrowell OMG	March 24, 2011	March 23, 2014	Closed	—
Europe	Smilegate West (previously SG Interactive)	August 31, 2011	November 7, 2018	Merged into the West server	—
Brazil	Smilegate West	November 29, 2011	—	Active	—
South East Asia	Gambooz	September 12, 2013	March 17, 2015	Closed	—
Latin America	Smilegate West	January 28, 2014	March 18, 2020	Merged into the West server	—

== Commercial performance ==
Crossfire is the most played video game worldwide, with 6 million concurrent users and 1 billion registered players in February 2020, according to developer Smilegate, with the majority of players in Asia, especially China and South Korea. The game had 660 million players worldwide by 2018.

In 2013, the game was one of the three most popular video games in China, with a revenue of almost $1 billion and worldwide it became the top-grossing game of 2013 at ₩1.5 trillion ($1.3 billion).

By 2015, Crossfire had grossed $6.8 billion, making it one of the top five highest-grossing video games of all time, along with Space Invaders, Pac-Man, Street Fighter II and World of Warcraft.

Crossfire grossed $1.1 billion in 2016 and $1.4 billion in 2017, making it one of the three top-grossing PC games for both years, along with League of Legends and Dungeon Fighter Online (DFO).

In 2018, Crossfire grossed $1.3 billion, making it one of the year's five top-grossing video games, along with Fortnite, DFO, League of Legends and Pokémon Go.

It generated $1.4 billion gross income in 2019.

== Adaptations ==
=== Film ===
A film adaptation of the game was announced in October 2015.

=== Television ===
A Chinese streaming television series based on the game named Crossfire (穿越火线) premiered in July 2020, starring Luhan and Leo Wu and was a commercial success with more than 1.7 billion views in China as of October 2020.

In August 2024, the game was revealed to be adapted in Secret Level, a video game anthology series created by Tim Miller. The episode, Crossfire: Good Conflict, stars the voices of Ricky Whittle, Claudia Doumit, Samuel Roukin, Matt Peters, Jessica Camacho, Jake Matthews, Aidan Bristow, Chris Jai Alex, and Piotr Michael, and was released on December 10, 2024.
