= Silkroad Online =

2005 video game

Silkroad Online 실크로드 온라인
- Developer: Marviex
- Publishers: Yahoo! Korea (Korean servers); Joymax (international servers)1.310 (International servers)
- Platform: Microsoft Windows
- Release: V1.0 = 2005; V1.588 = 22 December 2020
- Genre: MMORPG
- Mode: Multiplayer via TCP/IP

Gemini Silkroad Online (Korean: 실크로드 온라인) is a fantasy MMORPG set in the 7th century AD, along the Silk Road between China and Europe. The game requires no periodic subscription fee, but players can purchase premium items to customize or accelerate gameplay.

== Gameplay ==
Silkroad Online is noted for its "Triangular Conflict System" in which characters may select one of three jobs, trader, hunter, or thief to engage each other in player versus player combat. Thieves attack traders who are protected by hunters. Hunters kill thieves getting experience to level up to a higher level of hunter. Traders complete trade runs which give experience to increase their trader level, and thieves kill traders and hunters to level up. Thieves can also steal goods dropped by traders to take to the thieves' den in exchange for gold and thief experience.

In the Legend I update for Silkroad, the European classes and areas were introduced to the International servers, in Legend II, Fortress War was introduced. In fortress war, guilds fight to take hold of a fort which gives them the ability to raise taxes and hold some prestige over other guilds. In Legend III, Roc Mountain was added and the level cap was increased to 90. In addition, 9th Degree Armor and Weapons was added for both races. In Legend III+, the Bandit Fortress was added to iSRO, as well as Devil's Spirit silk dress.

In March 2009, Legend IV was introduced to the international version of Silkroad. Included in Legend IV are 10th degree weapons and armor for both European and Chinese characters. Also included was Ch'in Tomb, with monsters ranging from level 70 to 100. To enter the tomb, a character must be level 70 or above. The new unique monster added in Legend IV was Medusa, a level 105 snake from Greek mythology.

Players are given the option to create either a Chinese or European character. Each of the races has its own advantages, disadvantages, cities, weapons, armor and classes.

== Reviews ==
In April 2005, Silkroad Online received a score of 8.4 ("nice") out of 10.0 from GameSpot Korea. The reviewer praised the game's three-way player versus player system, character customization, and berserker mode, but found the quests and storyline lacking.
