= Ragnarok Online 2: The Gate of the World =

Massively multiplayer online role-playing game

- Developers: Gravity; Team Mercury
- Publishers: Gravity; AsiaSoft; Level Up!
- Composer: Yoko Kanno
- Series: Ragnarok series
- Engine: Unreal Engine 2.5
- Platform: Microsoft Windows
- Release: Open-beta: May 28, 2007; Services terminated: August 2010
- Mode: Multiplayer

Ragnarok Online 2: The Gate of the World (Korean: 라그나로크 온라인 2: The Gate of the World; alternatively subtitled Epic of the Light) was a massively multiplayer online role-playing game created by Gravity Corp. of South Korea and is the sequel to Ragnarok Online. Most of the game's universe is based on Norse mythology. After entering a closed beta testing phase in 2006 and continuing through 2010 in Korean open beta testing, the game was reworked multiple times due to its poor initial reception. The entire game was scrapped in 2010, and a new version, Ragnarok Online 2: Legend of the Second, was released two years later. The new iteration of Ragnarok Online 2 returns to the systems and mechanics of the original Ragnarok Online while keeping the 3D engine.

== Development ==
=== Announcement ===
The game was first announced at KAMEX (Korea Amuse World Expo) in November 2004. The first trailer of the game was shown during the expo, in which a novice boy and novice girl were running toward each other in an undisclosed 3D city environment.

In September 2005, Gravity Corp. launched a major campaign to promote the game at the annual Tokyo Game Show. Attendees had the opportunity to play the game for the very first time at Gravity-hosted booths during the three-day event (September 16-18). Gravity released multiple gameplay videos to the public, as well as an animation video, during this time frame.

Gravity Corp. launched the remake version of Ragnarok Online 2 and changed their slogan to Ragnarok Online 2: Legend of the Second. The original version of the game was closed in August 2010 and a new version of Ragnarok Online 2 was released in March 2012.

=== Beta phases ===
In December 2006, Gravity began accepting applications for the first closed beta test in South Korea. The first closed beta officially ended on December 29. Application to participate in this beta was made available for a week. Over 190,000 applications were submitted but only 2000 were chosen to participate for a period of three days (December 27-29). Due to several technical issues and server tweaking, the total testing time was only about 10 hours. According to an interview between the Korean newspaper Chosun Ilbo and developer Team Mercury, the main goal for the first closed beta was to test characters. They wanted to see how gamers would react to the overall feel of the game as well as whether character designs were accepted by them.

For the second phase of the Korean closed beta, 3,000 users were automatically accepted upon registration and login via the website, with another 5,000 being selected before and on February 22, 2007. The original closed beta testers were also given access to phase two. Towards the end of this phase, a special event invited 10,000 additional players to join testing, leading to a total of 20,000 selected accounts.

The third phase of the Korean closed beta ran from April 26 to May 5, 2007. It was open for 100,000 registered users as well as those players from the previous closed beta. In order to balance the large amounts of traffic, Gravity opened a second server at the start of the third phase.

The final phase of testing was the Korean open beta running from May 28, 2007, to an unannounced date, where the final release of the game was expected right after. It was open to all Korean citizens with a Korean resident registration number and during the first week, the servers went through severe maintenance as each server quickly filled up. Several more servers were opened shortly after to fit the demand, including several age 18 and up only servers to accommodate those who wish to participate in a player versus player environment. The focus during open beta was game balance and mechanics. The game content was similar to the previous closed betas and was expected to see a greater release of content in the near future, but most likely after the game was to be released.

In 2008, the Korean open beta had condensed its number of servers to just two. By this point, the game's population had also seen a dramatic decrease since it first opened in May 2007 – many areas in the game such as Hodemines and Prontera were usually found to be empty.

=== Current status ===
Changes in Gravity's leadership along with the game being poorly received in Korea during the open beta slowed development on Ragnarok Online 2. Gravity since reworked the entire game.

The schedule for the launch of Ragnarok Online 2 was delayed to the fourth quarter of 2010, having originally been scheduled to launch in the first half of the year, but Gravity decided to postpone the launch in order to improve the game further. The company planned to start commercial service of Ragnarok Online II in Korea in the fourth quarter of 2010 followed later by the other territories where Gravity has already entered into license and distribution agreements.

"The launch of Ragnarok Online II has been delayed on a number of occasions but we don't want to launch it before it is ready and want to ensure that it meets the expectations of our players as well as those of our own. We will continue to refine Ragnarok Online II and look forward to providing our users with a high-quality experience". - Mr. Toshiro Ohno, the President and CEO of Gravity.

The game had been in beta testing since May 2007 and was consistently delayed until the announcement was made that the entire game would be rebuilt from the ground up as a true Ragnarok Online sequel. The remake has been named Ragnarok Online 2: Legend of the Second and Ragnarok Online 2: The Gate of the World's service was terminated on August 2, 2010.

== Plot ==
The year 1000 L.C is approaching. One thousand years prior, a terrible destruction took place, and the world was saved by St. Lif. Roughly twenty years earlier, a destructive war took place between Normans of the east and west, but there has recently been peace. Strange things have begun happening, however; the dark wanderers Dimago have awoken, and the Ellr have left their land of Alfheim to investigate the Mother Tree's silence.

== Gameplay ==
=== Specialty Job system ===
Normans had the ability to freely change jobs out of combat and level each of the jobs independently; progress on a certain job was not lost when switching between jobs. This was accompanied by a flexible stat system where a majority of the stats were based on job so that players were not forced to select few jobs by their stat selection. The original Ragnarok Online had only a small amount of stats from jobs with most of them being decided by the player, forcing them along a certain build/playing style.

In The Gate of the World, certain abilities were converted into a block and put onto that character's skill grid. This allowed Sword Mastery, a swordsman skill which increased damage dealt with blades, used to help level another class with a sword. Different abilities had different block shapes and sizes and not all abilities were shared. Special abilities were gained by leveling a character's job class, giving them the ability to create useful and original class combinations, such as battle mages and wares-selling thieves.

There was a limit to how many special abilities could employ at a time. Characters started with fewer than 16 blocks, but gradually gained additional blocks as they leveled.

=== Complex Job Change system ===
The first Ragnarok Online featured a unique leveling system in which a character's base level and job level were leveled separately, but once a job was chosen, it could not be changed.

=== Equipment leveling ===
RO2 implemented a new system in which equipment could itself level up. This system allowed people to keep their favorite pieces of equipment because they continued to be useful instead of tossing them out when they became outdated. When an item reached enough experience to level up it did not instantly level up. It had to be taken first to a smith in a town and then to upgrade the weapon for a fee. While the class of weapon did not change, its attributes did. For instance a sword which was suited to combat classes favored spell-casting classes once it had leveled up.

Equipment in RO2 was separated into two categories: leveling-type and non-leveling type. The leveling equipment types could gain experience and level up like the player, whereas the non-leveling type did not acquire any experience and did not level up at all.

== Races ==
Ragnarok Online 2 introduces two new races, The Ellr and the Dimago. Each race has advantages to it that make it a viable choice when a new player is creating their character.

=== Norman ===
Height comparison of the Ellr and Norman

The Norman race has a human appearance and is the race that was played in RO1. They use the Job System, allowing them to switch their job at will and take advantage of specialty skills. The original appearance of the Norman, a very childish look, was re-designed for a more mature look. The race's name may likely be a reference to the historical Normans or Norsemen, given the game's focus on Norse mythology. It could also be a portmanteau of the words "normal" and "human".

=== Ellr ===
The Ellr are a half-breed, born between an interracial relationship between the Normans and the Elves. They inhabit their own land known as "Alfheim". After participating in the war between the eastern and western Normans, they returned to Alfheim, but have recently returned to Midgard to investigate why their "Mother Tree" fell silent. The power of an Ellr comes from the magical stones they possess, called "Stones of Ancestors". These stones influence their skills, and as such the Ellr has no professions or classes. They may only equip two stones at a time, however. The original model of the concept Ellr appeared as a super deformed art style. It was later redesigned to appear more normal in proportions, although still very childlike.

=== Dimago ===
The Dimago are the rejected offspring of a relationship between the Colossus and Norman. They have apparently been under an enchanted sleep, and have no memory of their previous lives. They "fight with style" and are able to make use of dynamic skill trees. The characters are designed to be 7-8 heads tall in height (that of an average human). This, compared to the Ellr, which are 2~3 heads tall, or the Normans, which are 4~6 heads tall, means that the Dimago are the tallest playable race in the game.
