= Gravity (video game company) =

South Korean video game corporation

Gravity Co., Ltd.
- Type: Public
- Traded as: Nasdaq: GRVY
- Industry: Video games
- Founded: April 2000; 26 years ago
- Headquarters: Seoul, South Korea
- Key people: Hyun Chul Park (CEO); Yoshinori Kitamura (COO); Heung Gon Kim (CFO)
- Products: Video games
- Revenue: ▲KRW₩141,623,000,000 (2017)
- Net income: ▲KRW₩13,314,000,000 (2017)
- Parent: GungHo Online Entertainment
- Subsidiaries: Gravity Interactive; Gravity Game Tech
- Website: www.gravity.co.kr

Gravity Co., Ltd. (Korean: 그라비티 주식회사) is a South Korean video game corporation primarily known for the development of the massively multiplayer online role-playing game Ragnarok Online.

== History ==
The corporation started as a small business in Shinsa-dong, Kangnam-ku, Seoul, South Korea and has expanded to an international corporate interest with several subsidiary divisions. On 8 February 2005, Gravity Corporation made their IPO and traded $108 million US dollars on NASDAQ under the ticker symbol GRVY, making it the first Korean game company to be listed on the NASDAQ.

The company has had a rather turbulent history initially involving internal political conflicts between CEO Hakyu Kim (who eventually left the company), and company president Jung Ryool Kim (who later assumed control as CEO), but has since stabilised and expanded operations to all of north and south-east Asia through supervised partnerships with native corporate entities. However, while Gravity Corporation's flagship product Ragnarok Online is considered a success in Asia, operations are not as well developed in Europe and the United States in comparison to similar products marketed and developed there.

Jung Ryool Kim, diverted approximately $6 million in company funds to himself between 2002 and 2004, which eventually led to an investigation, settlement, and corrections of financial statements for those years. On 30 August 2005, Jung Ryool Kim, the controlling shareholder, sold his 52% stake and set plans to quit as a director. The buyers of his shares were Ezer and Techno Groove (which later merged into Asian Groove) of Japan, a pair of technology ventures controlled by Il Young Ryu and Taizo and Masayoshi Son. After becoming the new majority shareholder, on 13 September 2005, Il Young Ryu was named by Gravity as its new chairman and joint chief executive. EZER subsequently returned Techno Groove's investment of 9.9 billion yen to Asian Groove, which gave up any interest in Gravity. On 19 October 2007, EZER sold their interest in Gravity to Son Assets Management or SAM.

On 22 May 2006, Gravity announced it had invested $9 Million in US game developer Perpetual Entertainment. Consequently, Gravity received a position on Perpetual's board of directors. Gravity also received "priority rights for future access to contents and other intellectual property rights of Perpetual Entertainment." On 21 November 2007, Gravity announced they had lost their investment after Perpetual cancelled its development of the MMORPG Gods and Heroes.

On 5 December 2007, Gravity announced they had formed a new US-based game developer, L5 Games. L5 is a subsidiary of Gravity Interactive, Inc. and is based in San Mateo, California. The company was composed of former Blizzard Entertainment employees, and went into liquidation in 2008.

On 14 February 2008, GungHo Online Entertainment obtained 52.4% stake of Gravity.

On 7 August 2026, Gravity resolved to pay its first interim cash dividend to shareholders.

=== Legal issues ===
Gravity faced litigation in 2006 when two US based hedge funds complained that majority shareholders and officers had violated their fiduciary obligations. In 2007, Gravity agreed to settle for $10 million, but continued to deny any wrongdoing.

== Titles ==
The following are games that have been published and/or are currently being developed by Gravity.

=== Ragnarok Odyssey ===
Ragnarok Odyssey was developed by Game Arts and released in February, 2012 for PlayStation Vita.

=== Requiem: Bloodymare ===
Requiem: Bloodymare (Korean: 레퀴엠 온라인) is a massively multiplayer online role-playing game created by Gravity. It was released in South Korea on 31 August 2007 for Microsoft Windows.

=== Ice Age Online ===
On 14 January 2008, the company announced an exclusive seven-year deal with 20th Century Fox licensing and merchandising to develop and publish Ice Age Online, an online game based on Fox's Ice Age motion picture franchise, but development was halted in 2009.

=== Ragnarok Online ===
Ragnarok Online (Korean: 라그나로크 온라인) is a massively multiplayer online role-playing game created by Gravity based on the manhwa Ragnarok by Lee Myung-jin. It was released in South Korea on 31 August 2002 for Microsoft Windows. Much of the game's mythos is based on Norse mythology, but its style has been influenced by Christianity and various Asian cultures as well. The game has spawned an animated series, Ragnarok the Animation, and a sequel game, Ragnarok Online 2: Legend of the Second, (a remake of Ragnarok Online 2: The Gate of the World) released in South Korea on 26 March 2012. It has also spawned a beat 'em up game called Ragnarok Battle Offline, which was developed by French Bread and published by Gravity.

=== Ragnarok Online 2: Legend of the Second ===
Ragnarok Online 2: Legend of the Second (Korean: 라그나로크 온라인 2: Legend of the Second; is a massively multiplayer online role-playing game, the sequel to Ragnarok Online. Most of the game's universe is based on Norse mythology. The soundtrack was produced by Yoko Kanno, well known for her work in Cowboy Bebop and other anime series.

=== ROSE Online ===
ROSE Online, or Rush On Seven Episodes Online (Korean: 로즈 온라인) is a massively multiplayer online role-playing game which was created by Korean company Triggersoft and published by Gravity Corp. Triggersoft stopped developing the game in 2007, and the rights of ROSE Online were sold to several different companies which now develop and publish their own versions of the game. For instance, Gravity Interactive, Inc. develops and publishes its version of the game for 3 North American and 40 European countries.

=== Double Dragon II: Wander of the Dragons ===
Double Dragon II: Wander of the Dragons is a beat 'em up game based on the arcade game Double Dragon II: The Revenge. It was released for the Xbox 360 via Xbox Live Arcade service.

=== Ragnarok: Eternal Love ===
Gravity released a mobile game titled Ragnarok: Eternal Love in 2017.

=== Ragnarok: Origin ===
Ragnarok: Origin is a mobile adaptation of the franchise which was released in 2021.

=== Ragnarok Labyrinth NFT ===
In 2022, Gravity released a version of Ragnarok featuring collectible blockchain-based non-fungible tokens (NFTs).

=== Ragnarok Online 3 ===
Ragnarok Online 3 is developed by Gravity's Hong Kong headquarters, Gravity Game Vision. is set to release in 2026 on PC and mobile devices.

=== Mobile/Handheld ===
Gravity has also developed and/or published the following titles for mobile devices or portable consoles:

- Ragnarok M: Eternal Love
- Ragnarok X: Next Generation
- Ragnarok R
- MR!P: Miracle PORORO
- MagicPuzzle Island
- Ragnarok: Path of Heroes
- RO: Idle Poring
- Requiem Mobile
- Ragnarok DS
- Ragnarok Begins

=== PC ===
Gravity Corporation has also developed and/or published the following PC game titles:

- Arcturus - The Curse and Loss of Divinity
- Emil Chronicle Online
- Paper Man
- Pucca Racing
- Requiem: Bloodymare
- Stylia
- Time N Tales

== Subsidiaries ==
Gravity owns a number of subsidiary companies, which publish and develop its games in countries and regions around the world.

- Gravity Interactive publishes games in North America. It was established in March 2003, and is based in Buena Park, California.
- Gravity CIS, Inc. publishes games in Russia and CIS countries. It was established in 2005 and is based in Moscow, Russia.
- Gravity Europe SAS publishes games in Europe. It was established in September 2006, and is based in Paris, France.
- Gravity Game Arise publishes games developed in Japan and overseas for the Japanese and Asian markets. It was established in July 2019 and is based in Tokyo, Japan.
- Gravity Game Tech publishes games in Thailand. It was established in 2019 and is based in Bangkok, Thailand.
- Neo Cyon, Inc., established in 2000, develops and publishes mobile games and MMORPGs. It was acquired by Gravity in 2005.
- Triggersoft, which created ROSE Online, was acquired by Gravity in 2005. It was liquidated in 2007.

== See also ==
- Ragnarok Battle Offline
