= Coffee Talk Episode 2: Hibiscus & Butterfly =

2023 visual novel video game

- Developer: Toge Productions
- Publisher: Toge Productions
- Director: Kris Antoni Hadiputra
- Producer: Frederick Tirta
- Designer: Fredrik Lauwrensius
- Programmer: Fredrik Lauwrensius
- Artist: Dio Mahesa
- Writers: Junkipatchi; Anna Winterstein
- Composer: Andrew Jeremy Sitompul
- Engine: Unity Engine
- Platforms: Windows; macOS; Nintendo Switch; PlayStation 4; PlayStation 5; Xbox One; Xbox Series X/S
- Release: WW: 20 April 2023
- Genre: Visual novel
- Mode: Single-player

Coffee Talk Episode 2: Hibiscus & Butterfly is a 2023 visual novel developed and published by Indonesian studio Toge Productions. It was released on 20 April 2023 for Windows, Nintendo Switch, PlayStation 4, PlayStation 5, and Xbox One. The sequel to Coffee Talk, the release came shortly after the death of the main creator of the series, Mohammad Fahmi. Toge Productions originally planned the game as downloadable content for Coffee Talk, but the developers decided to release it as a standalone game due to a significant expansion of the story and gameplay.

== Gameplay ==
As the continuation of the first episode of Coffee Talk, both pixel art games are a visual novel, which consists of reading dialogue. This is done alongside working as a barista at a café to serve coffee and other hot drinks to customers. Both also feature relaxing lo-fi music, set in a late-night rainy Seattle, where the barista will meet a variety of fantastical customers including orcs, fairies, werewolves and vampires. It is also possible to create latte art for aesthetics.

== Development and release ==
The game was developed and published by Toge Productions. After Coffee Talk received requests for additional stories for the game's characters, Toge Productions planned a downloadable content (DLC) project for Coffee Talk. The developers planned that the development of the DLC would be done in at most two or six months, but game development continued for around one year as they continued adding gameplay features and revising the story. The studio decided that the game be released as a sequel rather than a DLC as it would be more financially viable.

The sequel to Coffee Talk was announced on 31 August 2021. It was released as a demo on 17 January 2022, shortly before the death of Mohammad Fahmi, the main creator of the first episode of Coffee Talk, in March 2022. The game was released on 20 April 2023 for Windows, Nintendo Switch, PlayStation 4 and Xbox One.

A sequel/spin-off, Coffee Talk Tokyo was released on 21 May 2026.

== Reception ==
Reception

Aggregate score
Aggregator	Score
Metacritic	PC: 79/100; NS: 82/100

Coffee Talk Episode 2: Hibiscus & Butterfly received mostly favourable reviews across various platforms on Metacritic.

Izzatul Razali for IGN Southeast Asia states that the game "provides a great visual representation of the concept of 'sonder' through encounters with strangers in a public setting" while Digitally Downloaded states that the game is "grounded in realism despite its fantasy world". Mikhail Madnani for TouchArcade opined that the game was "laser focused on my tastes" and gave it a 4.5 out of 5 on the Nintendo Switch.
