= Ragnarok Online 2: Legend of the Second =

2012 video game

- Developer: Gravity
- Publishers: KR: Gravity Co.; NA/EU: Gravity Interactive
- Producer: Jun Jin Soo
- Artist: Lee Myung-jin
- Composer: Yoko Kanno
- Series: Ragnarok series
- Engine: Gamebryo
- Platform: Microsoft Windows
- Release: KR: March 26, 2012; NA/EU: May 1, 2013
- Genre: Massively multiplayer online role-playing game
- Mode: Multiplayer

Ragnarok Online 2: Legend of The Second (Korean: 라그나로크 온라인 2 Legend of the Second; RR: Rageunarokeu Onrain 2 Legend of the Second) is a massively multiplayer online role-playing game developed and published by Gravity Co. and is the sequel to Ragnarok Online.

The original version of the game, Ragnarok Online 2: The Gate of the World, was scrapped in August 2010, and a new version, Ragnarok Online 2: Legend of the Second, was developed instead. The new iteration of Ragnarok Online 2 returns to the systems and mechanics of the original Ragnarok Online while keeping the 3D engine. The game engine was changed several times since its predecessor opened its long running closed beta in 2007. The new version of Ragnarok Online 2 uses the Gamebryo video game engine. The previous iteration used Unreal Engine 2.5.

Ragnarok Online 2 SEA was published by AsiaSoft for Malaysia, Singapore, Thailand and Vietnam. Ragnarok Online 2 was published by Gravity Interactive for North America and Europe. The game was launched on May 1, 2013.

== Gameplay ==
=== Job system ===
Aside from simply selecting a class, players can also choose a profession from Chef, Alchemist, Artisan or Blacksmith. Each job specializes in crafting a specific type of items which will be beneficial to the players themselves or to trade with other players. To increase their level in a specific job, players would need to gain Job Experience. In order to gain Job Experience, one would need to constantly craft based on recipes of that job or mine/gather materials. To get the recipes players would need to talk to the respective Job NPC.

In addition to the job system, there is also a newly introduced Dual-Life System in which characters can take upon a secondary role. These roles offer unique abilities that help in expanding the capabilities of a specific character.

=== Dual-Life system ===
Of all the classes brought back to life from the original Ragnarok Online, only the Merchant class was not included. The new Dual-Life System allows character development in a whole new light. Instead of using a Merchant to set up shops and vend, players are enabled, with a new function, to set up their characters as NPCs (non-playable characters) while they are offline, rendering their services (healing, crafting, tailoring etc.) to active players to make a profit (such as equipment crafting).

=== Card system ===
The card system from the original Ragnarok Online returns in the sequel. This time the cards are attached to the character instead of individual items. The reason for this change is that in Ragnarok Online many rare items were often overshadowed by low-level items socketed with powerful cards. This made the inherent abilities in rare items much less relevant, and it proved to be a limiting factor when making new content. Furthermore, many players had trouble obtaining such cards because they were incredibly rare. To counter these issues, cards were implemented in ranks of bronze, silver, and gold. Therefore, a gold card was difficult to obtain, whereas the bronze card was relatively common. This new system was later modified in the "Limited Edition Test" so that instead of bronze, silver, and gold cards, there are regular and special cards. By combining up to five different cards at the card master, players are rewarded with a special card which further increases its stats. Once a player has the maximum amount of cards equipped, he or she must destroy one of the equipped cards to replace it with a new one. However, replacing a special card with a new one will result in the card being sent back to the inventory instead.

=== Pet system ===
The pet system from Ragnarok Online returns in the sequel. In the game, players are required to collect the Monster DNA in order to make them as a pet. The Pets will assist players with attack and buff or de-buff.

== Development ==
The game's first closed beta test was set on August 31, 2010, and all past testers of Ragnarok Online 2: The Gate of the World received access to the CBT if they activated their accounts on the website.

In January 2011, Gravity Corp. initiated their second closed beta test that lasted four days. Named the "R-Care Test", its aim was to evaluate the content and changes that occurred after the initial CBT, as many popular suggestions were applied to the game.

Ragnarok 2 was officially launched in Korea on March 26, 2012.

Ragnarok Online 2: Legend of the Second SEA server was published by AsiaSoft/Playpark for Malaysia, Singapore, Thailand and Vietnam markets in 2013. The Indonesia server was published by Lyto.

The NA and EU servers for the game launched on May 1, 2013, published by Gravity Interactive.

By December 2013, Gravity was taking Ragnarok Online 2 offline in Korea because of lack of players, but the developer hinted that the game could return in the future. The shutdown did not affect the NA, EU or SEA versions of the game.

Asiasoft/Playpark shut down SEA server in October 2014, but characters from SEA server were transferred to NA server and continued their progress.

European servers of Ragnarok Online and Ragnarok Online 2 were shut down in most of Europe on May 25, 2018, excluding CIS countries.
