= Ragnarok Online =

South Korean MMORPG

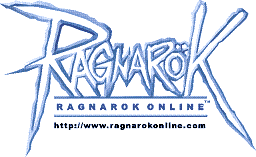
- Developer: Gravity
- Publisher: Gravity
- Designer: Kim Hakkyu
- Artist: Lee Myung-jin
- Writer: Lee Myung-jin
- Engine: AEGIS
- Platform: Microsoft Windows
- Release: KOR: August 31, 2002; NA: June 1, 2003; EU: April 15, 2004; AU: December, 2004
- Genre: Massively multiplayer online role-playing
- Mode: Multiplayer

Ragnarok Online (Korean: 라그나로크 온라인, Rageunarokeu Onrain marketed as Ragnarök, and alternatively subtitled The Final Destiny of the Gods) is a massive multiplayer online role-playing game (MMORPG) created by Gravity based on the manhwa Ragnarok by Lee Myung-jin. It was released in South Korea on 31 August 2002 for Microsoft Windows. The game has spawned an animated series, Ragnarok the Animation, and a sequel game, Ragnarok Online 2: Legend of the Second. The player's characters exist in a world with a player environment that includes NPCs (non-playable characters) that can be interacted with, and creatures spawning in maps that need to be defeated to level-up and to acquire items.

== History ==
Ragnarok Online was launched in South Korea in August 2002. The official Ragnarok Online servers underwent massive game system changes in 2010, which has been titled "Renewal", which revamped game mechanics, changed the behavior and interaction of stats, gears, and modifiers in the stat system, changed the way and amount of character experience, and introduced the 3rd Job Classes. There are various other changes that come with "Renewal", including interface and hotkey alterations, as well as skill changes.

On May 25, 2018 (the date of implementation of European General Data Protection Regulation rules), the servers of Ragnarok Online and Ragnarok Online 2 were shut down in most of Europe, excluding CIS countries. The Malaysia, Singapore, Philippines (MSP) servers of Ragnarok Online were shut down on November 28, 2021.

Following its South Korean launch, Ragnarok Online expanded to additional international markets. Gravity established Gravity Interactive in the United States in March 2003 to support its international operations, while the game subsequently became available in North America, Europe, Australia, Japan, China, and other territories. The game's international expansion contributed to the establishment of separate regional services operated by Gravity and its publishing partners.

During the early years of service, Ragnarok Online received numerous content and gameplay updates that expanded its world, character classes, skills, equipment, and systems. The game's class system grew substantially beyond its original classes, while new areas and monsters were introduced through successive updates. The game also developed a strong emphasis on player interaction through guilds, player-versus-player combat, and Guild versus Guild activities.

== Description ==
=== Setting ===
Ragnarok Online is divided into a series of maps on two major continents, each of which has its own terrain and native monsters, though many monsters are present in multiple regions. Transportation between maps requires loading the new map and monsters are unable to travel from one map to another unless directly associated with the player such as a pet, mount, or hireling. Areas from Norse mythology are included.

Prontera City is one of the main cities in the game.

=== Gameplay ===
The gameplay is heavily based around Norse mythology, wherein the characters are taken from the stories around Ragnarök. Player characters interact in a 3D environment but are represented by 2D character sprites for front, back, side and diagonal facings. The major types of server-supported gameplay are Player vs Environment, Guild vs Guild, Player vs Player. Also supported by the game server are Group vs Group, Arena Combat, Player vs Monster, Player vs All, and various other specific scenarios at designated instance locations in the game world. Non-player character-run challenges and contests are also available with prizes, awards, and/or in a specific hall of fame listing.

Players can sign up for quests and submit them for rewards as well as access storage and teleport services for a small fee. Every town will have the usual stores and shops where players can purchase and sell their items. The stores differ from city to city because each city is affiliated with a different job that players can choose from; therefore, the goods each sell are relatively for that particular job that the city is affiliated with. Quests usually provide a unique reward such as learning a new skill or receiving a rare item.

The job system initially consisted of 13 classes, which has increased to over 50 via several updates. Each class specializes in certain skills corresponding to archetypes in a role-playing game. Additionally, numerous equipment are exclusive to particular classes. The greatness of the equipment depends on the character attribute status.

Once a player reaches player level 99 and job level 50, they can 'rebirth' their character (not applicable to expansion classes and Super Novices). Rebirthing brings a character back to level 1 for both player level and job level. Reborn characters generally work the same as regular characters up until the second class. Instead of a second class, characters that are born can transcend to a new second job, different from those of a character that has not been reborn. These transcended job types have more skills and a larger number of 'stat points' to allocate to characters compared to second classes. The experience curve for transcendent jobs is significantly higher. Players are given the option to advance onto their third classes which provide an additional set of skills as well as allowing with player to break through the traditional level cap of 99.

== Music ==
The "Theme of Prontera" is the music that accompanies players visiting Prontera City.

== Release ==
Ragnarok Online was released in Korea on August 31, 2002.

It was released in North America on June 1, 2003; Europe on April 15, 2004; and Australia in December 2004.

== Reception ==
Reception

Aggregate scores
Aggregator	Score
GameRankings	84%
Metacritic	79/100

Review scores
Publication	Score
IGN	9.1/10
Jeuxvideo.com	14/20
PC Games (DE)	79%
RPGamer	5/10

Overall, Ragnarok Online has been critically acclaimed and commercially successful, especially in Korea during the mid-2000s.

== Other media ==
In 2004, Ragnarok Online's popularity also contributed to the expansion of the franchise into other media. The anime series Ragnarok the Animation premiered in Japan, while Gravity continued developing additional Ragnarok-related games and products. The franchise subsequently expanded to other platforms, including handheld and mobile games, alongside the continuing PC MMORPG.

=== Phone games ===
Gravity partnered with SkyZone Entertainment to release a series of standalone mobile phone games that supplement Ragnarok Online. There were 5 games, each one based on one of the 6 original first classes, thus leaving Acolyte excluded. The sole release in the North American market, Ragnarok: Mobile Mage, features the playable mage class. Players are given the ability to transfer earned zeny (the in-game currency) to their Ragnarok Online game account.

=== Web series ===
In 2019, when the latest game, Ragnarok: Forever Love, was about to be launched, Gravity collaborated with Indonesian director Billy Christian to create a romantic web series titled Cinta Abadi ("Eternal Love"), comprising six episodes. Yoshinori Kitamura, chair of Gravity Game Link's board of directors, said that the company wanted to focus on other forms of entertainment. Cinta Abadi premiered on YouTube on 11 September 2019, at the same time as the release of the beta version of Ragnarok: Forever Love. The web series centres on a love story that unfolds among characters from the game: Andi (inspired by Knight, played by Brandon Salim); Renata (inspired by Priest, played by Amanda Rawles); and Egi (the Assassin, played by Shandy William), stemming from their common interest in the game Ragnarok: Forever Love. Professional gamer and influencer Dea Marella plays Renata's best friend.

Rawles also arranged the version of the "Theme of Prontera", which appears on the soundtrack album Ragnarok Forever Love: Cinta Abadi.

== See also ==
- Ragnarok (manhwa)
- Ragnarok Battle Offline
- Ragnarok DS
- Ragnarok Online 2: Legend of the Second
- Ragnarok Online 2: The Gate of the World
