= Asphere Innovations =

Thai video game development company

Asphere Innovations Public Company Limited
- Native name: บริษัท แอสเฟียร์ อินโนเวชั่นส์ จำกัด (มหาชน)
- Company type: Public company
- Traded as: SET: AS
- ISIN: TH0963A10Z08
- Industry: Internet, publishing
- Founded: 2001; 25 years ago
- Headquarters: Bangkok, Thailand
- Areas served: Thailand; Vietnam; Indonesia; Philippines; Singapore; Malaysia
- Key people: Mr. Pramoth Sudjitporn
- Subsidiaries: A Capital Co., Ltd. Playpark Co., Ltd. Thaiware Communication Co., Ltd. Skynet Systems Co., Ltd. Asiasoft International Co., Ltd. PlayCybergame Co., Ltd. Playpark Pte Ltd. PT. Asiasoft; Playpark Inc. CIB Development SDN BHD. CIB Net Sdn. Bhd.
- Website: www.asphere.co

Asphere Innovations (formerly known as Asiasoft) is a tech holding company and an online game operator under Playpark in Thailand, Vietnam, Indonesia, Philippines, Singapore and Malaysia. Its headquarters is located in Bangkok, Thailand. Asphere's services are primarily operated within Southeast Asia.

Asphere was founded in Thailand in 2001 with the primary objective of providing games and promoting online content in Thailand. Asphere's core business covers the publishing of online massive multiplayer games and multiplayer online games, co-publishing and development of new products.

Asphere works very closely with game operators and developers located in Bangkok, Thailand. Asphere's support also has presence in Singapore, Malaysia, Vietnam, Indonesia, and Philippines. The Asiasoft Group currently consists of 600 employees.

AsiaSoft Online is 100% subsidiary of Asphere Innovations of publishing companies with a presence in Singapore, Malaysia, Thailand and Vietnam serving over 15 million gamers.

AsiaSoft Online's network and distribution channels in Singapore and Malaysia span over 1000 retail outlets which include PC Bunk, 7-Eleven outlets, popular bookstores, Comic Connection stores, convenience stores, cybercafes and SAM machines.

MapleStorySEA has broken numerous performance records including an online community that was awarded Singapore's most popular website in the gaming category.

Asiasoft Online has also organized over 35 real-life game events for their players such as the MapleStorySEA Birthday Bash, PangyaSEA Fiesta and AuditionSEA Hari Raya Puasa Celebration. Players must verify their AsiaSoft Passports with their National IDs in order to participate in most of the real life events and parties.

== Company divisions ==
=== Asphere Innovations PCL. (Thailand) ===
Asiasoft was first founded in 2001 in Thailand, but services extended to encompass most of South East Asia. Asiasoft published Asian games and multiplayer online games, and co-published and developed of new products. In March 2003 Asiasoft published its first two games, Ragnarok Online from Gravity and Dragon Raja Online from eSofnet. In 2004, two more new games were published and co-published: Gunbound from Softnyx and TS Online, and in late 2005, MapleStory from Wizet.

In June 2022, Asiasoft announced that shareholders are approved for changing company direction and changed their name to Asphere Innovations to focus on the digital tech company.

=== Asiasoft Co. Ltd (Vietnam) ===
Asiasoft Co. Ltd(Vietnam) was formed in 2001 in Vietnam to manage gaming services provided in Vietnam. Asiasoft was the first publishing game company to be established in Vietnam. Asiasoft Vietnam published Asian games and multiplayer online games, and co-published and developed of new products. The first published game from Asiasoft was Gunbound from Softnyx. Later in the year Asiasoft also published TS Online from Chinese Gamers of Taiwan.

=== Trilight Cove Enterprises Ltd (Indochina) ===
Trilight Cove Enterprises Ltd was formed in 2001 to manage Asiasoft subsidiaries in Vietnam, Cambodia, and Burma.

=== Asiasoft Online Pte. Ltd. (Singapore) ===
Asiasoft Online Pte. Ltd. (Singapore) was formed in 2004 to publish and manage games MMORPGs (massively multiplayer online role-playing games) in Singapore and Malaysia. Playpark Pte. Ltd. has published MapleStory, PangYa, KongKong Online, Audition Online, GetAmped, Darkness and Light and Grand Chase. It is also the official and sole distributor for Blizzard Entertainment's World of Warcraft products in Singapore. Playpark Pte. Ltd. has teamed up with SilkRoad Online, Gunbound, MU Online and Shot Online to allow players to purchase A-Cash before redeeming it for the respective games' cash points. It has since been merged with several Asiasoft subsidiaries to form PlayPark Pte Ltd.

=== Asiasoft Online Sdn. Bhd. (Malaysia) ===
Asiasoft Online was formed in 2004, to publish and manage game services in Malaysia, it also works with Asiasoft Online Pte. Ltd(Singapore) to co-manage English server games. It has since been restructured and rebranded, operating under the new name CIB Development Sdn Bhd.

=== PlayPark Pte Ltd ===
As part of restructuring, PlayPark Pte Ltd was formed to oversee all game managing divisions of Asiasoft International Company Limited, merging several Asiasoft subsidiaries under one company.

=== PT. Asiasoft (Indonesia) ===
PT. Asiasoft was founded 2011 in Indonesia and has published three games for PC:

- AIKA Online (terminated 2014)
- AVA (terminated 2014)
- Brawl Buster (terminated 2013)

PT. Asiasoft has expanded on mobile games platform (regional) and currently four titles are running:

- Advance Dino
- Heart Castle
- Line Dragonica Mobile
- Playpark Dragon Encounter

=== Playpark Inc. - former name Level Up! Inc. (Philippines) ===
Asiasoft Corporation Public Company Limited reported that it would acquire 70% of the Philippines-based company Level Up! Inc. for $2.9 million on February 5, 2014, acquisition was completed in the same year. Its portfolio is now published under Asiasoft's website.

== Asiasoft Passport ==
Players are required to sign up for Asiasoft Passports in order to play any of the company's published games. Like Gamania(requires ID Card(Taiwan)) and Nexon Korea(requires RRN), it also required an identity document number(known in Singapore as NRIC, and in Malaysia as MyKad) to sign up. That requirement was dropped in 2008. In 2019, with the departure of its final game, MapleStorySEA, to a new login service named MapleStorySEA Passport, Asiasoft Passport services has officially been discontinued.

== PlayPark ID ==
In 2011, Asiasoft introduced the concept of PlayPark accounts, advertised by Asiasoft as a one stop service for players to managed their Asiasoft published games' accounts with only one set of login credentials, this service was only offered to new games released since PlayPark ID services started, older active titles such as MapleStorySEA, and AudtionSEA were still accessed via Asiasoft Passport.

Currently Thailand, Singapore, Malaysia, Vietnam, Indonesia and the Philippines have implemented the Playpark system. In January 2022, PlayPark changed its logo and announced its plans to incorporate blockchain technology and NFT into the games.

== Published games ==
=== Playpark Co., Ltd. (Thailand) ===
Game	Released/started	Developed by	Status	Genre	Notes
Yulgang	9 November 2005	KRGsoft	Online	MMORPG	
Audition Online	2006	T3 Entertainment	Online	Dancing	
Elsword	2012	KOG	Online	MMORPG	
Dragon Nest	27 March 2012	Eyedentity Games	Online	Action MMORPG	Transfer publishing license from Eyedentity Games
MU Online	2019	Webzen	Online	MMORPG	Transfer publishing license from New Era & Winner Online & Webzen
Last Chaos	2018	Barunson Games	Online	MMORPG	Transfer publishing license from Gamigo
Skyforge	2022	My.com	Online	MMORPG	Transfer publishing license from My.com
Three Kingdoms II	2001	N/A	Offline	RSLG	
Arabian Nights	2001	N/A	Offline		
Seven Years' War	2001	N/A	Offline		
Ragnarok Online	September 2002	Gravity	Online	MMORPG	Transferred publishing license to Electronics Extreme & Gravity in 2016 To 2020
Kritika Online	May 2016	All-M	Online	Action MMORPG	Transferred publishing license to Steam in 2019
DC Universe Online	2014	Daybreak	Online	MMORPG	Transferred publishing license to Steam in 2017
Ghost Online Nicknamed Soul Saver	2008	Mgame	Online	MMORPG	Transferred publishing license to Steam in 2017
Seal Online	2004	YNK Interactive	Online	MMORPG	Transferred publishing license to Playwith in 2017
Cabal Online	26 July 2007	ESTsoft	Online	MMORPG	Transferred publishing license to Electronics Extreme in 2017
Combat Arms: Line of Sight	10 November 2015	Black Spot Entertainment	Online	FPS	Transferred publishing license to Steam in 2016
Counter-Strike Online	23 August 2012	Nexon Korea	Online	FPS	Transferred publishing license to Steam in 2013
Ragnarok Online 2	24 October 2013	Gravity	Online	MMORPG	Transferred publishing license to Warpportal in 2015
Phantasy Star Online 2	2014	SEGA	Online	MMORPG	Transferred publishing license to SEGA in 2017
Elyon (video game)	7 July 2022	Kakaogames	Online	MMORPG	Terminated on 27 April 2023
Football City Manager	18 July 2013	HANBITSOFT	Online	MMORPG	Terminated on 27 December 2015
Granado Espada	9 October 2006	IMC Games	Online	Fantasy MMORPG	Terminated on 31 March 2022
MapleStory	16 September 2005	Wizet	Online	MMORPG	Terminated on 29 June 2012
Swordsman Online	2019	Perfect World	Online	MMORPG	Terminated on 31 December 2022
S4 League	December 2011	GameOn Studio	Online	TPS	Terminated on 15 December 2015
Alliance of Valiant Arms	August 2011	Redduck	Online	FPS	Terminated on 15 December 2014
TalesRunner	2016	RHAON	Offline	Racing	Terminated on 8 August 2023
RAN Online	2017	MIN Communications	Online	MMORPG	Terminated on 6 March 2021
Onimusha Soul	21 May 2015	CAPCOM	Online	Platform	Terminated on 29 April 2016
Perfect World	2020	Perfect World Entertainment	Online	MMORPG	Terminated on 12 August 2022
Priston Tale II	2012	Yedang	Online	MMORPG	Terminated
Flyff	2018	Aeonsoft	Online	MMORPG	Terminated on 31 December 2020
Luna Online	2017	Eyasoft	Online	MMORPG	Terminated 15 May 2019
Cabal Online II	June 2016	ESTsoft	Online	MMORPG	Terminated on 27 February 2018
Divina Online	10 May 2013	Gamania	Online	MMORPG	Terminated on 14 October 2014
Heroes of The Storm	14 January 2015	Blizzard Entertainment	Online	MOBA	Terminated
Rappelz Online	2009	nFlavor	Online	Fantasy MMORPG	Terminated
World in Audition	26 February 2015	T3 Entertainment	Online	Music dancing	Terminated on 31 March 2016
Strife	2013	S2 Games	Online	MOBA	Terminated
Shaiya Online	2019	Aeria Games & Entertainment, inc.	Online	MMORPG	Terminated
Yulgang II	14 August 2014	Mgame	Online	MMORPG	Terminated on 12 October 2015
Tanki Online	2019	Alternativa	Online	MMORPG	Terminated on 31 May 2021
8 เทพอสูรมังกรฟ้า (Dragon Oath)	2010	Changyou	Online	MMORPG	Terminated on 13 October 2015
Sudden Attack	23 April 2009	GameHI	Online	FPS	Terminated on 30 September 2015
The Exorcist	2013	TigerCool	Online	MMORPG	Terminated on 26 September 2014
''Richman Online"	2009	SoftStar	Online	Puzzle	Terminated on 31 May 2011
HY2 Online	3 September 2012	Chinesegamer	Online	FPSRPG	Terminated on 29 August 2014
Ever Planet	26 July 2012	Nclipse/Nexon Korea	Online	MMORPG	Terminated on 27 August 2014
Twelvesky 2	2010	ALT1	Online	MMORPG	Terminated on 31 March 2014
Fashion Dream	2012	NokNok	Online	Fashion Online Game	Terminated on 12 July 2013
Star Project	2012	Atoonz	Online	Social Game	Terminated on 13 January 2014
Gigaslave Nicknamed Metal Assault	2011	GNI Soft	Online	2D Action	Terminated on 23 March 2014
Q Tale	23 May 2012	Chinesegamers	Online	Cute MMORPG	Terminated on 30 May 2014
Shinchan	2013	Windysoft	Online	MMORPG	Terminated on 30 June 2014
King Naresuan Online	16 February 2012	PromptNow	Online	MMORPG	Terminated on 26 June 2014
Lost Saga	29 September 2011	IO Entertainment	Online	Fighting	Terminated on 16 June 2014
Sheep Farm	2012	nooslab	Online	Farming Game	Terminated on 21 October 2013
Darkness and Light	2007	N-Log Inc.	Online	MMORTS	Terminated
Dragon Raja Online	October 2002	eSofnet	Online	RPG	Terminated on 31 May 2005
JY Online	December 2003	Chinese Gamer	Online	MMORPG	Terminated on 3 April 2007
God Of Emperor	14 September 2011	Interserv	Online	MMORPG	Terminated
GunBound	20 February 2004	Softnyx	Offline	Casual	Terminated on 31 December 2006
TS Online	15 May 2004	Chinese Gamer	Online	MMORPG	Terminated on 31 October 2008
BnB (Bomb and Bubble)	26 October 2005	Nexon	Online	Shooting Fantasy	Terminated on 31 December 2007
FreeStyle Street Basketball	1 March 2008	JC Entertainment	Online	Sports MMO	Terminated on 27 May 2013
Dekaron	1 October 2008	GameHI	Online	Fantasy MMORPG	Terminated on 31 January 2011
Furinkazan	1 May 2009	mGame	Online	MMORPG	Terminated on 31 January 2012
Fashion Dream	2012	NokNok	Online	Fashion Online Game	Terminated on 12 July 2013
Atlantica Online	August 2009	NDOORS Interactive	Online	MMORPG	Terminated on 31 October 2013
AIKA Online	February 2011	HanbitSoft	Online	MMORPG	Terminated on 27 June 2013
Camon Hero	12 January 2012	T3 Entertainment	Online	MMORPG	Terminated on 31 August 2012
R2Beat Online	January 2012	CJ E&M/SEED 9 Games	Online	Rhythm racing	Terminated on 13 August 2012.
SuperStar Online	10 October 2012	Choi Rock Games	Online	Music karaoke	Terminated on 21 January 2014
GangZa Online	5 April 2011	AIM Advance	Online	MMORPG	Terminated on 1 April 2013
Summoner Master Online	2009	?	Online	Card game	Terminated in 2010
Quest Master	12 September 2015	All Saint Studio	Online	Card game	Terminated in 2015
Play Arcade Online	?	?	Online	?	Terminated
Football City Stars	29 September 2012	Ubisoft	Online	Fantasy MMORPG	Terminated on 28 October 2013
Band Master	31 May 2011	Dysun	Online	Dance	Terminated on 24 September 2013
Vanilla Cat	6 October 2009	CJ	Online	Casule	Terminated on 29 July 2011
ROHAN	2010	YNK Interactive	Online	MMORPG	Terminated 21 August 2014
Freejack	12 March 2012	Bigspoon	Online	Extreme Sport Casual	Terminated on 4 April 2013
Grand Chase	22 October 2009	KOG Studios	Online	Fantasy MMO	Terminated on 29 August 2013
Monster Master Online	19 November 2010	Nineyou International Limited and its subsidiaries	Online	MMORPG	Terminated on 30 December 2011
Pocket Ninja Online	8 December 2011	NGames Limited	Online	Action MMORPG	Terminated on 30 December 2013
Chinese Hero Online	21 January 2011	Chinesegamers	Online	MMORPG	Terminated on 27 June 2013
Pocket Ninja Social	31 May 2013	Dream2	Online	Web Game	Terminated
TAAN Online	27 August 2009	Electronic Arts	Online	Artillery game	Terminated
Pocket Ali	January 2013	Dream2	Online	Web game	Terminated
3 Kingdoms Warriors	1 April 2011	We Made	Online	Action MMO	Terminated on 29 June 2012

=== Asiasoft Online (Southeast Asia*) ===
Game	Released/started	Developed by	Genre	Language	Status	Service	Notes
MapleStory	2005	Wizet	MMORPG	English	Online	Singapore, Malaysia	Named MapleStorySEA to differentiate from other servers across the globe, only players with Singapore or Malaysia IP can access the server due to region lock. Currently managed by Playpark Pte Ltd,
Ascent: Infinite Realm	2019	KRAFTON	MMORPG	Thai, English	Offline	Thailand	No further updates after First Beta test, servers still remains closed as of 2022
Ragnarok Online 2	27 December 2012	Gravity	MMORPG	English	Offline	Singapore, Malaysia	
Yulgang 2	2013	KRGSoft	MMORPG	English	Offline	South East Asia	Publishing rights sold to Cubizone
Cabal Online	2007	ESTsoft	MMORPG	Local	Offline	Singapore, Malaysia	Services terminated on 23 September 2016, publishing rights reverted to ESTgames Corp. Players were allowed to migrate their accounts until 25 October 2016
Cabal Online II	TBA	ESTsoft	MMORPG	Local	Offline	Singapore, Malaysia	
Yulgang	9 July 2009	mGame	MMORPG	English	Offline	Singapore, Malaysia	Services terminated in February 2011
Sudden Attack	2009	GameHi	MMOFPS	Local	Offline	Singapore, Malaysia	Services terminated on 30 September 2015
Alliance of Valiant Arms	2011	Redduck	FPS	Local	Offline	Singapore, Malaysia, Philippines	Services terminated on 15 December 2014
K.O.S: Secret Operations	-	YNK Games/YNK Korea	FPS	Local	Offline	Singapore, Malaysia	
GetAmped	-	CyberStep	Casual	Local	Offline	Singapore, Malaysia	
GetAmped2	-	CyberStep	Casual	Local	Offline	Singapore, Malaysia	
Cosmic Break	2012	CyberStep	Casual	Local	Offline	Singapore, Malaysia, Thailand	
Strife	2015	S2Games	MOBA	Local	Offline	Singapore, Malaysia, Thailand, Indonesia, Philippines, Vietnam	
Audition Online	September 1, 2006	T3 Entertainment	Casual	Local	Offline	Singapore, Malaysia	Services terminated on September 1, 2018, and replaced by Audition: Next Level
The Exorcist	TBA	Incool Games	MMORPG	Local	Offline	Thailand	Services terminated after close beta due to lack of interest
Phantasy Star Online 2	29 May 2014	Sega	MMORPG	Local	Offline	Singapore, Malaysia, Thailand, Indonesia, Philippines	Services terminated on May 26, 2017
DC Universe Online	15 July 2014	Sony Online Entertainment	MMORPG	Local	Offline	South East Asia	Services terminated in August 2015, publishing rights reverted to WB Games and Sony Online Entertainment LLC(now Daybreak Game Company), players were allowed to migrate their accounts until September 2015
Majong Hirne	-	-	-	Local	Offline	Singapore, Malaysia	
Bubble Ninja	-	Likekong	2D Scrolling	Local	Offline	Singapore, Malaysia	
MCCQ	-	-	-	Local	Offline	Singapore, Malaysia	
Dragonica	May 2009	Gravity	MMORPG	Local	Offline	Singapore, Malaysia	Services terminated on 30 May 2012
PangYa	2006	Ntreev Soft	MMORPG	Local	Offline	Singapore, Malaysia	Services terminated on 25 August 2008
Kong Kong Online	2006	Mega Enterprise	Racing	Local	Offline	Singapore, Malaysia	Services terminated in 2007
Requiem : Alive Online	2010	Gravity	MMORPG	Local	Offline	Singapore, Malaysia	Services terminated in 2011

(*) Joining Asiasoft Online Pte Ltd and AS Online Sdn Bhd. Country is Thailand, Vietnam, Indonesia, Philippines, Singapore, Malaysia, Cambodia, and Burma

=== Playpark Pte. Ltd. (Singapore) & CIB Development Sdn. Bhd. (Malaysia) ===
Game	Released/started	Developer	Genre	Service	Notes
MapleStory	2005	Wizet	MMORPG	Singapore, Malaysia	
Audition Online	September 1, 2006	T3 Entertainment	MMOG	Singapore, Malaysia	
GetAmped	2007	CyberStep	MMOG	Singapore, Malaysia	
Sudden Attack	2009	GameHi	MMOFPS	Singapore, Malaysia	
Cabal Online	2008	ESTsoft	MMORPG	Singapore, Malaysia	
AIKA Online	March 2011	HanbitSoft	MMORPG	Singapore, Malaysia	
Alliance of Valiant Arms	11 November 2011	Redduck	FPS online game	Singapore, Malaysia	
3 Kingdom	-	N/A	RSLG	Singapore, Malaysia	
Majong Hirne	-	-	-	Singapore, Malaysia	
Sudden Attack	2009	GameHi	MMOFPS	Singapore, Malaysia	
Surrogate Mothers Online	-	-	-	Malaysia	
Risk Your Life	-	-	-	Malaysia	
Finding Neverland Online	-	-	-	Malaysia	
MCCQ	-	-	-	Malaysia	
KFH Online	-	-	-	Malaysia	
Hero Online	-	-	-	Malaysia	
Darkness and Light	2007	N-Log Inc.	MMORTS	Singapore, Malaysia	Terminated on 30 April 2008
Grand Chase	2007	KOG Studios	MMORPG	Singapore, Malaysia	Terminated on 14 April 2009
FreeStyle Online	2009	JC Entertainment	MMOG	Singapore, Malaysia	Game hosted by GameKiss
Rappelz	2008	nFlavor	MMORPG	Singapore, Malaysia	Terminated on 1 September 2009.
Warriors of the 3 Kingdoms (Chinese server)	2009	WeMade Entertainment	MMORTS	Singapore, Malaysia	Chinese server merged with English server on 9 February 2010.
Warriors of the 3 Kingdoms (English server)	12 November 2009	WeMade Entertainment	MMORTS	Singapore, Malaysia	
RayCity Online	8 April 2010	EA Seoul Studio	MMORPG	Singapore, Malaysia	Terminated in 2012
Monster Forest	19 May 2010	9you	MMORPG	Singapore, Malaysia	
Priston Tale 2	2010	Yedang Online	MMORPG	Singapore, Malaysia	Closed beta started on 14 October 2010 and ended on 20 October 2010. Open beta has been delayed until further notice.
Field of Honor	TBC	Game World Tech	FPS / RTS	Singapore, Malaysia	
Battle of the Immortals	16 December 2010	Beijing Perfect World	MMORPG	Singapore, Malaysia	
S4 League	TBA	Game On Studio	Third Person Shooter	Singapore, Malaysia	Canceled/on hiatus
Warcry: Reign of Sword	TBA	T3 Entertainment	Third Person Shooter	Singapore, Malaysia	Canceled

=== Asiasoft Co. Ltd (Vietnam) ===
Game	Developed by	Notes	Status
Gunbound	Softnyx	Casual	Offline
Yulgang	KRGSoft	MMORPG	Offline
TS Online	ChineseGamer	MMORPG	Offline
The Legend of Three Kingdoms Online	Userjoy Technology	MMORPG	Offline
GetAmped	CyberStep	Casual	Offline
GetAmped2	CyberStep	Casual	Offline
Ghost Online	Mgame and NNG	MMORPG	Offline
Cabal Online	ESTSoft	MMORPG	Offline
Ragnarok Online	Gravity Corp.	MMORPG	Offline

=== PT. Asiasoft (Indonesia) ===
Game	Year	Developer	Genre	Notes
AIKA Online	2011	HanbitSoft	MMORPG	Terminated
Alliance of Valiant Arms	2011	Redduck	FPS online game	Terminated
Argo Online	2011	Mgame	MMORPG Sci-fi	Terminated

=== Playpark Inc. (Philippines) ===
Game	Developed by	Genre	Service	Notes
Cabal Online	ESTsoft	MMORPG	Philippines	Service terminated by ESTsoft; servers closed on June 11, 2024.
Rohan Online	YNK	MMORPG	Philippines	Service closed on October 31, 2014.
Ran Online	Min Communication	Action MMORPG	Philippines	
Hex: Shards of Fate	Cryptozoic Entertainment	MMO	Philippines	
Ragnarok Online	Gravity	MMORPG	Philippines, India, Brazil	Closed its local PH service on March 31, 2015, moved to iRO
Grand Chase	KOG	MMORPG	Philippines, Brazil	Closed PH server on November 17, 2014
Dance Battle Audition Philippines	YD Online	Music video game and MMOG	Philippines	

=== Trilight Cove Enterprises Ltd (Indochina*) ===
Game	Developed by	Genre	Language	Notes
GetAmped	CyberStep	Casual	Local	
GetAmped2	CyberStep	Casual	Local	
3 Kingdom	N/A	RSLG	Local	
Bubble Ninja	Likekong	2D Scrolling	Local	
Chosen	-	-	Local	
Ninedragon	-	-	Local	

(*) Country is Vietnam, Cambodia, and Burma.

== See also ==
- Gamania
- Nexon
- UserJoy Technology
