= YNK Korea =

Korean video game publisher

YNK Korea Inc.
- Industry: Online game publishing
- Founded: 1998; 28 years ago
- Headquarters: South Korea
- Subsidiaries: YNK Games
- Website: ynkkorea.com

YNK Korea Inc. is a South Korean online game publisher and developer found in 1998 with its head office in Seoul, Korea. The company originally concentrated primarily on a game marketing and a character licensing of Blizzard Entertainment then it started to focusing on online game contents publishing.

By servicing 'Ragnarok Online' of Gravity and 'Seal Online' of Grigon Entertainment in 2002 and developing its own games Rohan and Sting (K.O.S) through its subsidiary developing office, YNK Games, found in 2000, YNK Korea enlarged its business globally and became one of the first online game companies in Korea to listed on the KOSDAQ

In 2009, YNK Korea incorporated 'Seal Online' to its own game, and continued servicing 'Seal Online' along with Rohan and Sting through its partners in China, Germany, Indonesia, Malaysia, the Philippines, Thailand and through its subsidiary offices, YNK INTERACTIVE(U.S), YNK Japan, and YNK Taiwan.

== Games ==
Title	Developer	Genre	Servicing Territory	Website
Seal Online	YNK Games	MMORPG	Korea, China, Hong Kong, Indonesia, Japan, Malaysia, Taiwan, Thailand, U.S.A	www.sealonline.com
Rohan	YNK Games	MMORPG	Korea, Germany, Hong Kong, Indonesia, Japan, Philippines, Taiwan, Thailand, U.S.A	www.playrohan.com
Sting (K.O.S)	YNK Games	FPS	Korea, Philippines, U.S.A	http://kos.playrohan.com/main.html

== Partners ==
AERIA GAMES & ENTERTAINMENT INC. - Germany

AsiaSoft Corporation Public Co., Ltd. - Thailand

Level Up! - Philippines

PT.Lyto Datarindo Fortuna - Indonesia

CYF - China
