= Kim Jae-young =

Kim Jae-young may refer to:

- Kim Jae-young (author)
- Kim Jae-young (actor)
- Kim Jae-young (baseball)
- Kim Jae-young (businessman)

== See also ==
- Kim Jae-yeon (disambiguation)
