= Ijji =

Game portal website

ijji
- Website type: Online game portal
- Available in: English (all titles), Spanish and German (Soldier Front and GunZ only)
- Owner: Aeria Games
- Creators: Ashton Mentz, La Mirada, CA
- Website: www.ijji.com
- Commercial: Yes
- Registration: Requires Facebook account
- Launched: July 7, 2006
- Current status: Down
- Content license: Copyright

ijji /ˈiːdʒiː/ was a free multiplayer game portal website. Games hosted at ijji ranged from traditional shooters and MMORPGs to more accessible casual games, all of which were free to download and play, and with the majority featuring competitive multiplayer gameplay. The ijji website opened on July 7, 2006. The American-based game portal published some well known worldwide titles that include Alliance of Valiant Arms, GunZ, and Soldier Front.

In 2009 ijji decided to focus more on the "hardcore" gaming segment, by releasing titles like Alliance of Valiant Arms and Soul of the Ultimate Nation. ijji later released Genesis A.D into open beta in November 2010.

ijji surpassed 10 million unique registered users in November 2009 and created a new logo for their game portal. The old orange ijji logo was replaced by a new metallic looking logo. In this same month, all flash games on ijji.com that required no download were closed and removed from the game portal.

In June 2011, ijji partnered up with Steam, a game distributing platform developed by Valve, and released Alliance of Valiant Arms as one of the free-to-play games available on Steam. This partnership allowed for the increasing of the community size of the free-to-play game portal. As a celebration, ijji gave away a free exclusive weapon, the British L8A52 rifle for new users who signed up on Steam.

Starting in October 2011, ijji removed the ability to sign up for a new ijji account. Instead, users logged in with their Facebook account to play ijji games. Existing users could still log in with their old accounts.

== Acquisition of ijji ==
In January 2012, NHN Corporation sold 100% stake of ijji to Aeria Games who began to host ijji's core games (GunZ, Soldier Front, and Alliance of Valiant Arms). By July, all ijji services were taken down and account transfers were open for users to transfer existing account data to Aeria Games.

Aeria Games closed GunZ in May 2013, and in 2016 Aeria stopped supporting Soldier Front and Alliance of Valliant Arms. The latter game was transferred to En Masse Entertainment and the game servers were ceased in June 2018.

At the end of 2018, Red Duck Inc., the developer of A.V.A, stated that they would self publish a modified version of their most popular game, AVA, under the name AVA: Dog Tag on Steam. After a period of beta testing, the project was closed in May 2019 as Red Duck Inc. ceased operations.

After a while, Neowiz came back and got the rights of the game by EnMasse and re-released the game under their management, A.V.A Global in August 2022.

== Games ==
=== 2006 ===
- Golf King (2006)
- Gunbound (2006 – transferred in July 2009 to game portal Softnyx)
- Gunster (2006)

=== 2007 ===
- Drift City (2007 – transferred in October 2010 to game portal GamesCampus)
- GunZ: The Duel (2007 - transferred in July 2012 to game portal Aeria Games who then dropped it in May 2013)
- KwonHo: The Fist of Heroes (closed/open beta 2007 – November 2007)
- Luminary – Rise of the Goonzu (2007 - transferred in May 2012 to game portal NDOORS)
- Soldier Front (2007 - transferred in July 2012 to game portal Aeria Games who then dropped in January 2016)

=== 2008 ===
- Lunia (2008 - transferred in April 2012 to game portal AllM)

=== 2009 ===
- Alliance of Valiant Arms – Urban Operation (2009 - transferred in July 2012 to game portal Aeria Games)
- Atlantica Online (2009 – transferred in March 2011 to game portal Nexon America)
- Holy Beast Online (2009 - transferred in June 2012 to game portal CyberStep, closing in the following month on July 31 for North America)
- Huxley: The Dystopia (closed beta 2009 – Sept 2010)
- Karma: Operation Barbarossa (closed beta 2009 – Dec 2010)
- Rohan: Blood Feud (2009 - transferred in March 2012 to game portal YNK Interactive)
- Soul of the Ultimate Nation (2009 – December 2010)

=== 2010 ===
- Genesis A.D. (2010 – April 2011, with the game being opened again in January 2012 on game portal Aeria Games under the name Repulse and later closing again in August of the same year)
- Karos Online (2010 - transferred in April 2012 to game portal Ignited Games, merging with Rosh Online: The Return of Karos)
- Neo Steam (2010 – December 2011)
- Splash Fighters (2010 - transferred in June 2012 to game portal CyberStep)
- Warrior Epic (2010 – November 2010)

=== 2011 ===
- Pandora Saga (2011 - transferred in March 2012 to game portal Atlus Online)
- Cosmic Break (2011 - transferred in June 2012 to game portal CyberStep)
