= CardMon Hero =

2011 video game

- Developer(s): Redbana
- Publisher(s): HanbitSoft
- Platform(s): Microsoft Windows
- Release: ^{OB} January 19, 2011
- Genre(s): Card battle, MMORPG
- Mode(s): Multiplayer

CardMon Hero (previously known as Orka Online, Yuina Online: Adventure ORKA and Camon Hero) is an anime-inspired free-to-play massively multiplayer online role-playing game (MMORPG) developed by Redbana and published by HanbitSoft. The game is unique in that players are able to command their primary avatar along with various mercenaries summoned via magical cards. Also, unlike most MMORPGs players, are not given classes to choose from but instead weapons which can be changed at any time and depending on which weapon is equipped decides what cards can be used. The game was released worldwide into open beta on January 19, 2011, and a full release has yet to be announced.

== Gameplay ==
The game utilizes a card summoning system which sets it apart from most other MMOs. The player collects mercenary cards which may be summoned at any time during a battle in order to help the player. There are currently hundreds of mercenary cards that may be collected, all with varying skill levels. Summoning time is limited, however they may be re-summoned into the battle field after the cooling time. Therefore, the death of mercenaries will not affect the use of mercenary cards in future battles.

Strategic battles may be performed based on which mercenary cards are summoned during the battle. Also, monsters that cannot be defeated alone may be easily defeated with help from various mercenaries to support the player. Mercenary cards may have a wide range of different stats such as hit points, damage points and even healing powers. There are also different ways to upgrade the power of a mercenary card. The same type of cards may be combined in order to upgrade the skill level of those mercenaries. Also, special mercenary cards may be collected and combined with weaker cards in order to create a new card.

There is also an extensive hunting mode in the game that may only be played in parties or large guild units. In this mode, the player alongside their guild members face against stronger monsters do not usually appear in normal hunting fields. Special missions are given for each hunting field and awards are given after completion including experience points, mission points and rare items. Mission points may be accumulated to increase the hunting difficulty levels to face against stronger monsters. Also, accumulated mission points are calculated to rank the players. Rare items become accessible to high-ranked players which usually can't be obtained through any other means.

== Plot ==
The game is set in Aria, a place that has been governed by Inersia, Goddess of Light, and Zerdantis, God of Darkness. As their powers were in balance, the world was in peace. However, Zerdantis breaks the promise and decides to open the dimension door to summon evil creatures and spirits into Aria. Zerdantis takes a step further and plans to kill Inersia. He summones creatures from hell such as Kerberos to attack the goddess temple. Being outnumbered, Inersia creates an Ark Sign that contains all of her power and summons two heroes from the dimension door that the devil created. However, since she uses up all of her powers in creating the Ark Sign and summoning two Heroes, she dissipates away into the thin air. However, her death has paid off by successfully sealing off the devil with the cost of the Ark Sign.

As the memory of the devil fades away, Aria separates into four kingdoms: Superta, Kingdom of the Protector, Metadipos, Kingdom of Magic, Voncano, Kingdom of Mining, and Gatia, Kingdom of Trading. The Superta kingdom has two heirs competing for the throne. The first heir, Izen is a talented young knight who purified darkened Superta from the devil's power. The second heir, Liberto is a member of Superta's noble family. Soon, Liberto comes to realize that he cannot overcome the fame and support from the citizens and the congress that is pointed only toward Izen. As of result, he decides to take the throne with power.

Liberto starts to work with banned magic and seals Zerdantis' powers. Strange things begin to happen in Superta; domesticated animals start to attack humans and unprecedented monsters starts to attack human towns. As of result, the Superta Congress decide to give the throne to Izen or Liberto depending on whoever destroys the monsters first. Soon, the two heirs organize their armies and go on a journey to destroy the monsters. Izen's army decides to go south whilst Liberto's army starts to head north. However, Liberto soon decides to change their route and attack the Temple of the Goddess in Superta. After conquering the temple, Liberto finds the Ark Sign in the temple.

As soon as the news about how Liberto obtained the Ark Sign to awaken the devil spreads throughout the continent, people start to panic. The Great Oracle Yui decides to create a magic field to summon heroes from other dimensions to fight against the devil and Liberto after receiving messages from the Gods. However, the instability of the shattered Ark Sign consumes the Great Oracle Yui as soon as the magic field is activated. The player visits an abandoned amusement park which mysteriously disappears and transports the player to the land of Aria. The Great Oracle Yui asks for the player's help to save the world, so the fate Aria is now in the player's hands.

== Development ==
The game was revealed back in early 2006 as Orka Online and closed beta testing for the game began on July 15, 2006, in South Korea. In February 2008, G2G Entertainment confirmed that they would be hosting closed beta testing for Japan alongside Neowiz Games and that the game would be called Yuina Online: Adventure ORKA. The closed beta test took place between March 11 and March 14, 2008, however, the game was later dropped after failure to get the game popular.

On February 4, 2010, Uforia announced that they would be publishing the game as Camon Hero and it would be released later that same year in North America. In March 2010, the company announced that closed beta testing would run from March 2 to March 5. JK Kim, CEO of Uforia stated, "We are eager to open the game up to players during the closed beta and look forward to their insightful feedback." In celebration of the closed beta test, Uforia offered several events up for players. The first was leveling event where players who reach level 25 during the beta test were given the Private Store Guard Card (30 days), an item that would be offered in the item mall at launch. The "Search for Incorrect Spelling and Grammar Event" challenged players to help find any errors in the game and the top 3 players who submitted the most spelling and grammar corrections for the game client first, would win a large amount of Meso (in game currency) that they can use at launch.

On May 10, 2010, Uforia launched a second closed beta test for Camon Hero which lasted until May 12. A number of events and promotions took place during the testing including level rewards, where players who reached certain levels would have access to exclusive items that would not be available at launch. There was also a competition to see which player would complete their Card Book the fastest with prizes to be won. Uforia also announced that two iPod Shuffles would be given randomly to people who were "fans" of the Camon Hero Facebook page. If the selected winners also had a character created in Camon Hero, they would be given an iPod Nano instead of an iPod Shuffle.

On October 27, 2010, Redbana announced that they would be hosting the game worldwide and releasing it as CardMon Hero after publishing the game had been abandoned by Uforia. They also announced the beginning of closed beta sign-ups that would take place later in the year. Closed beta tests for the game began on November 10, 2010, and lasted until November 16. The second phase of closed beta testing ran from January 9, 2011, up until the game was released into open beta.
