= Audition Online =

- Developer: T3 Entertainment
- Publisher: YD Online (2004 - 2015) Hanbitsoft (2015 - present)
- Engine: Gamebryo
- Platform: Microsoft Windows
- Release: KOR: 2004; NA: April 2, 2007; UK: May 31, 2007; EU: June 25, 2007
- Genres: Music video game and MMOG
- Mode: Multiplayer

Audition Online (Korean: 오디션 온라인), also known as X-BEAT in Japan and popularly called AyoDance in Indonesia, is a free-to-play multiplayer online casual Rhythm game produced by T3 Entertainment. It was originally released in South Korea in 2004 and has been localized by various publishers around the world. Audition Online is free to play, but earns revenue by selling virtual items such as clothes for the player's avatar.

In the game, players have an avatar/dancer (which there are hundreds of customization options from hair, clothes, accessories, and other design options for their avatar. Also players are free to have alternate and secondary dancers/accounts), and they compete in dance battles, against other players live, to popular Pop music songs, (in addition to original Audition exclusive songs), with the goal being the player must correctly input arrow commands, come up with their own freestyle rhythm commands, match sound effects in timing, or copy verbal dance commands from an NPC, (depending on Audition's many different game modes.) The better a player performs during a song, the more their avatar levels/ranks up, and the more in game currency they get, to better customize their avatar (in addition to micro-transaction/virtual exclusive items to customize the avatar). Players can also engage in side non gameplay, networking features (such as forming friendships, and dance crews, with other players, and even having virtual relationships/weddings/marriages with others players.) Audition acts as an alternative fusion to Dance Dance Revolution and DJMax, also combining Life simulation elements as well.

The North American/United States distribution of Audition, was published in early 2007, by Los Angeles based company Nexon USA. Promotional material, included a commercial which was very frequently played on family networks such as Nickelodeon and Cartoon Network, featured a young woman watching a music video on television, ("With Love", by Hilary Duff), and putting herself "in the Audition game", with other players, and an announcer in which he tells the viewers to "get into Audition". The release sparked controversy, as the music selection consisted of vulgar/inappropriate songs, lack of game updates/maintenance, and hackers using cheats during gameplay, and making their avatars deformed/glitched. Because of these issues Nexon was pressed to rectify, ownership was transferred years later to Orange County, California based company Redbana, to where issues under Redbana's control were fixed. However, due to development issues, in 2023, Redbana disconnected the Audition servers. Two unofficial fan servers later launched; one launched in 2023 called "Audition Galaxy", and another launched in January 2024, called "Audition Nexus". The next incoming Unofficial fan server will launch soon, called "Audition Dance Battle". "Audition Dance Battle" is the reborn version of Audition Nexus. Another community-run server, "Audition Brasil", is also scheduled to launch soon.

== History ==
Audition Online was developed by T3 Entertainment and was released to Korean publisher 'Royworld' during July 2005. During June 2006, YeDang Online took Audition Online and named it Club Audition. The game also saw its first release outside of Korea in 2006 in the South-East Asian region, the Japanese region under the name Dancing Paradise and the Vietnamese region. In 2007, major publisher Nexon localised the game for the American audience. The game was then also localised for the UK and European audience where publishers 'Alaplaya' and 'G4' had an agreement to have a joint server. In June 2008, Audition saw the first release of the Season 2 update where the new game mode "Beat Rush" was added, updated graphics and adjusting the aspect ratio to 1024x768.

Nexon, in 2009, decided to not renew its contract with T3 Entertainment in order to operate Audition Online, thus having the Japanese and American servers shut down. In order to resolve this issue, T3 Entertainment subsidiaries Redbana and Hanbitstation published the game. American players could migrate their accounts and characters from Nexon over to Redbana.

On 30 September 2015, T3 Entertainment did not allow YD Online to renew its contract. This decision was made in order to allow T3's subsidiary HanbitSoft the ability to publish Audition Online. YD Online held the databases to Audition in South Korea, however, which prompted a server wipe. HanbitSoft, however, rewarded players with free CASH, cheaper CASH shop items, an exclusive indefinite outfit and more frequent updates. On 1 October, HanbitSoft was officially the publisher of Audition Online and Hanbiton was the official publisher of Audition in Korea.

== Gameplay ==
A player is allowed to create a room or join a room. The "DJ" (the player who creates the room) is given power to choose the settings for the room: song, "chance," and game mode. The song's BPM (beats per minute) usually will determine the song's difficulty and speed (with certain exceptions e.g. beat up mode). While the "DJ" has the power to kick people out of the room and close the dance floor off, this generally has no benefit. After all, the most appealing part of the game is its social aspect: playing alongside others whether for fun or competition.

The basic game is played by pressing the arrows displayed on the screen (with the exception of red "chance" arrows) and pressing the spacebar or the control key on every 4th beat of the song. The more accurately the spacebar or control key is pressed, the higher the score. A grade of "PERFECT" will provide players with the greatest score, a grade of "GREAT" and "COOL" will provide players with decent scores, a grade of "BAD" will provide players with very little score, and for "MISS" will provide players with no score for the turn. A player who receives a "MISS" will not get the chance to play for the next move.

The "Finish Move," a special move during most gameplay modes, can be said to be the hardest move. A player who does not miss the move before the "Finish Move" has the option to do it. Finish moves issue a lot of points and can often be the key to success.

A player who does two or more PERFECTs consecutively gets bonus points for doing so. These PERFECT combos (or "Perfect chains") enable players to interfere with the opposition. A blue circle indicates that the player made a PERFECT move and acts as a shield. When a player performs a PERFECT X1 (or perfect X2 in some cases), the players ahead of and behind him or her in score standings receive a yellow circle. Players with the yellow circle will not receive points if they do not achieve a PERFECT (in a Finish Move, it reduces score by a percentage rather than the whole score).

Players can increase their score by playing "chance." "Chance" can be activated by pressing the delete key or the "." key on the number pad whereby red keys appear and players have to press in the opposite direction of the red keys.

At the end of the dance battle, the person with the most points is the winner. That player's character is presented at the front of the stage. Each player will receive experience points and Den/BEATS according to their finishing positions.

If a single/group game (not including NPC, One-Two Party and Beat Up modes) is full, a random event (also called a mission) may occur. Bonuses are given for accomplishing these challenges. Some of the challenges are, but are not limited to: getting a specific beat judgment (e.g. no COOLs or no BADs), getting perfect combos (e.g. PERFECT X3), or getting a standing (e.g. getting number 1). The music can be random, random (new), or random from any range of tempos.

There are also different game modes such as:

1-2 Party/One-Two Party - where an NPC/randomly generated automaton dancer, in a computer generated/AI voice, will say a number (either 4 [numpad 4 or left keyboard arrow], 6, [numpad 6 or right keyboard arrow], 8 [numpad 8 or up keyboard arrow], or 2 [numpad 2 or down keyboard arrow]), and/or, will shout a word, ("Go" [spacebar or the control key], or "Yeah" [numpad 0 or 5]) and players must input the commands in the same tempo/speed the NPC shouted the commands, or it will be counted as a mistake/miss. In Easy mode, the numbers to press are highlighted better for players. In hard mode, the numbers go away. Each round consists of a non gameplay related cutscene/interlude/intermission where players aren't instructed to enter any commands, and instead view a replay of the dance moves/commands they just entered.

Beat Rush - where there are four ovals around the bottom of the screen with different keys. The user must press all of the keys at the precise beat in order to gain a "Perfect." Pressing all the keys at the correct beat will gain a Great, whilst pressing all keys at a bad beat or pressing a moderate number of keys at the correct beat will gain a Cool. Bads and Misses can be earned by pressing the fewest keys either at the correct beat or at the incorrect beat.

Beat Up - where individual keys come in six keys divided two different sides. Players must press each individual key at the correct beat to get a higher score. At 100 Combos and 400 Combos, a bonus score multiplier will be given.

Block Beat - where players team up and hit the three individual keys at the correct beat.

Boy's & Girl's - where boys and girls team up 2v2 or 3v3 in their respective genders and play the normal key mode in order to battle.

Couple Mode - where a boy and a girl must team up. Both characters will have the same move; however, their normal mode blue keys will be separated by random grey keys.

Club Dance I/II/III - where boys and girls team up to be couples for the game. I, II, and III each have their own unique quirks where players will generally provide each other with hearts, flowers, or gifts while switching between couple mode and normal mode.

Guitar Mode - where the individual notes come down and the player must hit the notes with the corresponding keys. The Guitar Controller can be bought in the Korean version or earned from events in the North American regions. However, the Guitar can be used throughout all servers. The Guitar Controller gives players an extra 20% EXP.

Rhythmholic - Players hear a series of sound effects (cats meowing, dogs barking, etc.) in the background of whichever song they chose. They must then in perfect timing, match the sound effects to the beat of a song. (With different sound effects having different key commands. For example, a cat meowing, players must press the left control key. A dog barking, players must press the right control key etc.) There is a cannon on top of the screen called the "Holic Gauge" which if a player gets every note in correct timing, the Gauge will fill to one hundred percent, and players will get extra EXP.

Shooting Stars - This mode plays similar to Beat-Up in which players strike notes when they move into their windows, but instead of a fixed two lanes, the notes are now all over the screen and it moves freely in many directions (an element similar to modern rhythm games like Osu!). There are three difficulty to choose from, with higher difficulty adding more notes to the screen and double-lanes that require players to press both Space Bar and notes at the same time.

Mouse Mode - Located in Normal Mode, you need to play with your own Mouse and you need to control the mouse movement and click some notes by left click or right click. The notes contain 2 kind of color which is Blue and the other is Red. This mode kind of different from other Casual Games, this Mode is a new refresh that created in Audition Online History.

=== Lyrics ===
Lyrics are available in a vast number of servers, such as Korean Audition, Chinese Audition, Ayodance and AuditionVTC. Not all songs contain lyrics, and a lyrics item must be bought using in game currency (DEN/BEATS) in order to utilize the lyrics system in-game.

=== Clothing ===
There has been an amount of exclusive clothing and accessories throughout different versions. X-Beat (the Japanese version) seems to be the most distinguishable, with Hanbit Ubiquitous designing most of their clothing, limited to their server. However, the clothing obtained from this server is locked behind either Fashion Boxes (boxes that earn random fashion items, from a random duration) and Re-Make Up boxes (step above Fashion boxes). Fashion Boxes often earn you two items per box, whilst Re-Make Up boxes earn one.

Redbana (the American version) has had its share of exclusive clothing/accessories, examples are during anniversaries, where clothing was exclusively made for Redbana and events when users were allowed to draw an accessory, where the winner will have its accessory in game.

Korean Audition initially had branded clothing from Sanrio, but in 2015, Vietnam Audition and Ayodance followed suit. Items that are branded can only be purchased for a maximum of 30 days (not the usual indefinite time period).

== Fashion Mall ==
The Fashion Mall section is where users can purchase clothing, accessories or items that can boost their in-game experience.

=== Couple Mall ===
Items exclusive to Couples are found here. These include clothing, pets, love licenses and rings (when users get married in game) and items such as the Date Planner. Players can also gift items to their partners here. If a couple breaks up, items will be locked and players not be allowed to wear them until they couple another person.

=== Make-Up ===
Make Up accessories can be assembled here, the user has to purchase a make-up accessory and a make-up item such as colours, sparkles, or colours + sparkles costing CASH. The user can then make up their item. Users can also level up their accessories by using MakeUp points, learnt in game. Leveling up accessories can give different designs of their wings. In X-Beat, the Re-Make Up boxes can be used to earn exclusive X-Beat clothing.

=== Mascot Salon ===
Shop for players' Mascot, containing exclusive clothes and accessories for the Mascot System. There are functional items such as foods and drinks, Name Change Card, Personality Change Card or Skin Color Lotion in order to customize Mascot further once players have bought them.

== Available regions ==
Region	Name	Language	Regions	Local publishers	Estimated release date	Status
South Korea	클럽오디션 (Club Audition); 2006-2015 then 2019-present Prev. published as 오디션 (Audition); 2015-2019.	Korean	South Korea	HanbitON (Other publishing portals include Daum and Hangame) (previously YDOnline/Ncucu)	October 15, 2004 – September 30, 2015 under YDOnline; October 1, 2015 – present under HanbitOn	Open
Japan	X-BEAT; Prev. published as ダンシングパラダイス (Dance Paradise) or people know it as ダンパラ (Danpara)	Japanese	Japan	Hanbit Ubiquitous Entertainment Inc. (previously NEXON Japan)	September 6, 2006 –March 31, 2016	Closed
China	劲舞团	Simplified Chinese	China	9you.com	2006	Open
South East Asia	Audition Next Gen (previously AuditionSEA and Audition Next Level)	Tagalog English	Philippines; Singapore; Malaysia	Asiasoft Corporation Co., Ltd. (previously E-Games - Level Up! Games Philippines & Asiasoft Online Pte. Ltd.)	2006–2017 under E-Games/Level Up Games; September 1, 2006 – August 31, 2018 under Asiasoft Online Pte. Ltd. September 1, 2018 – present under Playpark, server merge with E-Games and Asiasoft.	Open
Thailand	Audition Thailand	Thai	Thailand	Asiasoft Corporation Co., Ltd.	2006	Open
Vietnam	Audition VTC	Vietnamese	Vietnam	Vietnam Multimedia Corporation	July 2, 2006 – present under VTC Game	Open
Taiwan	勁舞團	Traditional Chinese	Taiwan	HappyTuk Co., LTD / MangoT5 (previously Insrea Game Center Corporation)	2007 – 2015 under Insrea Game Center Corporation; 2015 – present under HappyTuk Co.Ltd	Open
Hong Kong	勁舞團	Traditional Chinese	Hong Kong	Gameone (previously Gameone and 9you)	Previously closed down under Gameone and 9you February 17, 2020 – April 8, 2021 under Gameone	Closed
North America	Redbana	English	United States; Canada	Redbana US Corp. (previously NEXON America)	April 27, 2007 - April 8, 2009 under NEXON America. April 9, 2009 – August 29, 2023 under Redbana.	Closed
Latin America	Audition Latino	Spanish	South America; Mexico; Central America	Axeso5	2008	Open
Indonesia	Audition AyoDance	Indonesian	Indonesia	PT. Megaxus Infotech	2006	Open
Brazil	Audition Online	Brazilian Portuguese	Brazil	Hazit Online	April 2007 - July 2010.	Closed
Europe	Audition Europe	English German French Spanish Italian	Europe	Burda:ic GmbH (alaplaya)	2009-2014, server merge with G10 in 2009.	Closed
United Kingdom	Go Audition	English	United Kingdom	G10	2008 - 2010, server merge with alaplaya in 2009.	Closed

== Controversy ==
There have been some controversies server-wide on Audition.

For example, the axeso5 version of Audition Online has to name all their new songs - Month Year - Song no. (e.g. Febrero 2015 - Tema 04) while listing on their website the actual music title and artist it is by. Users can then find the title song by Tema 01, Tema 02, etc. While particular people in the game have pointed out that this method is used by axeso5 probably trying to avoid copyright claims whilst still adding more popular songs, their claim still remains a speculation and has not been proven.

The North American/Global version of Audition Online recently had a Vote Up event, asking users to write reviews during their launch on the Steam platform in exchange for 40,000 BanaCash (equivalent to US$40). Even though Redbana did not break any of Steam's regulations and did not intend to force users to vote up on Steam (as it was running for a limited time and Redbana claims that they just asked for the reviews of the game, not positive reviews), it caused player conflict including in the reviews and other forums. The event was closed down and every entry given before June 9 was given 40,000 BanaCash.

Even though the North American/Global version is also known as the Fashion Capital of Audition regions, receiving new and updated Fashion Mall items before any other server and also receiving some X-BEAT (Japan's Audition) exclusive items, the North American region has had misfortune with patches. There has been a drought with the number of songs the server has received, with waiting for at least two to three months in order to get three new songs. In order to help restore the game, the community has been helping getting songs with three of Redbana's new songs received in August's update being requested in the Community Choice's thread.

The South East Asian version of Audition used to provide an unban system for hackers by paying real money towards the Asiasoft team. However, the page seems to have been removed and the service is no longer there.

The Vietnamese version of Audition almost underwent a publisher change back in 2009 due to a mistake from VTC Online, who failed to renew the contract with T3 Entertainment as of Sep 26 2009. Four days later, VinaGame (a competitor of VTC Online and publisher of Hot Step) announced that they have acquired the right to publish Audition in Vietnam, and will soon open a portal to allow players to transfer their accounts to VinaGame Service. Even though VTC kept denying the claim, they eventually announced that it was indeed their fault and the three companies have worked behind the scene to solve this issue together. In the end, VinaGame agreed to back out of their contract and allowed VTC Online to retain publisher right for Audition and T3 Entertainment agreed to keep on their contract with VTC Online.

The Chinese and Hong Kong version of Audition has had trouble as well, some controversies including using the game and the game's forum board as a prostitution/sex service, using the forum board to sell drugs, having a child murder another child over 'virtual love' and a 15-year-old girl getting pregnant meeting up a 20 year old guy on Audition. The game has also been criticized by the Ministry of Culture in China.

Because of a disagreement between YD Online and T3 Entertainment, the Korean version of Audition has suffered. YD Online had signed up for a 10-year contract to Audition Online (thus named as Club 오디션) from 2005 and was looking to renew their service. However, midway, T3 Entertainment acquired HanbitSoft and owned Hanbiton. Now, T3 Entertainment is hesitating to renew YD Online's contract or even make YD Online one of the portals toward Audition (portals are owned by different companies, allowing users to register or login to which company they want, and then connect to the one Audition server). YD Online also owns the databases to the current Audition. Because of T3 Entertainment's negligence towards the Korean version of Audition, the game will undergo a full server wipe with UI changes, new fashion items and more. To compensate, Hanbiton is offering 100000 CASH (equivalent to 100000 WON) to players who pre-register their IGN (In-Game Name) before the 30th of September. T3 and Hanbiton have done a very aggressive marketing strategy which was successful and has received a big percentage of their users back.

== Audition Portable ==
Audition Portable is a PlayStation Portable port of the game, released in South Korea in 2007. It features over 100 songs and includes a multiplayer modes for 6 players, online ranking, along with new songs, maps and dance motions that were released as downloadable content.
