= Osmium (disambiguation) =

Osmium is a chemical element with symbol Os and atomic number 76.

Osmium may also refer to:

- Osmium (album), the debut album of American funk band Parliament
- Osmium weapons, a type of weapon material found in the online videogame Cabal Online

== See also ==
- Isotopes of osmium
