= YNK =

YNK may refer to one of the following

- YNK Interactive, a game developer and publisher in South Korea.
- Yeketî Niştîmanî Kurdistan, (Patriotic Union of Kurdistan) a Kurdish political party
- Yelahanka Junction railway station, Bengaluru, Karnataka, India (by Indian Railways station code)
