= Lunia =

Lunia may refer to:

- Lunia: Record of Lunia War, a 2008 video game
- Lunia (Dungeons & Dragons), the first layer of Mount Celestia in Dungeons & Dragons
