= CDC Games =

Chinese video game company

- Type: Video game publisher
- Industry: Internet
- Founded: June 9, 2006
- Headquarters: Shanghai, China
- Website: www.cdcgames.net

CDC Games is a publisher and operator of online games and MMORPGs in China. Its headquarters are located in Shanghai, China. It is a subsidiary of NASDAQ-listed CDC Corporation. It was launched on June 9, 2006.

CDC Games has had approximately 11 million active users over the past 90 days, and over 30 million active users in the past 180 days. The company pioneered the "free-to-play, pay-for-merchandise" online games model in China with Yulgang and launched the first free-to-play, first-person shooter Special Force. Currently it operates Digimon Battle Online, Special Force, Shaiya and Yulgang in China.

== See also ==
- Software industry in China
- China Software Industry Association
