= ALFTP =

- Developer: ESTsoft Corp.
- Stable release: 5.31 / February 1, 2012; 14 years ago
- Preview release: Non [±]
- Operating system: XP, Vista, 7, 8
- Available in: English, Korean
- Type: FTP client/server
- License: Proprietary
- Website: www.altools.com

ALFTP is an FTP client and personal FTP server utility from ESTsoft for Microsoft Windows. It is part of ESTsoft's ALTools product family.

While it has been available in Korean since 2000 as freeware (commercialized in 2002 for government and corporate use), it was first made available in English in 2004, and has since been made available in over ten languages. Translations for ALFTP are provided by members of the ALTools user community.As of December 1, 2008, ALFTP has ceased to be a free program for some years, finally as of August 22, 2012, ALFTP has released once again as freeware.

The software received positive reviews in South Korea for its simplicity, and for having a Korean language interface.

== Personal FTP Server ==
The FTP server is intended for personal use by non-technical users. Its single-user interface, permissions, and user connection limit of 5 precludes ALFTP from being used in large sites.

== ALTools Eggheads ==
The AL part in ALFTP is a transliteration from the Korean, '알FTP', which directly translates as EggFTP. Other ALTools feature similar egghead cartoon characters as mascots for each program.

== License changes ==
As of December 1, 2008, ALFTP was no longer freeware for a few years, requiring a commercial license for all uses until 2012, although copies downloaded before December 1, 2008 were not affected by the new requirement. Finally, as of August 22, 2012, ALFTP was switched back to freeware, with ESTsoft publishing free serial numbers for its products.

== See also ==
- ALZip
- ESTsoft
- Freely redistributable software
