= Kim Jae-young (businessman) =

South Korean game developer (born 1973)

- 김재영
- Born: 1973 (age 52–53)
- Education: Hanyang University
- Occupations: Businessman, video game developer
- Employer: Lionheart Studio

Korean name
- Hangul: 김재영
- RR: Gim Jaeyeong
- MR: Kim Chaeyŏng

Kim Jae-young (Korean: 김재영; born 1973) is a South Korean businessman and video game developer. The cofounder and chairman of video game developer Lionheart Studio, he is one of the richest people in South Korea. In April 2024, Forbes estimated his net worth at US$1.07 billion and ranked him 36th richest in the country.

== Biography ==
He was born in 1973. He has a master's degree in mechanical engineering from Hanyang University. In 2001, he worked at Japanese video game company Koei. In 2003, he became a team leader at South Korean video game company Softnyx. In 2005, he became director of development at Neowiz. In 2012, he cofounded and became CEO of Action Square. In 2018, he cofounded and became CEO of Lionheart Studio.
