= ESTsoft =

South Korean software company

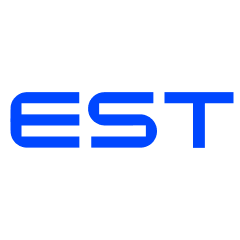
- Type: Private
- Industry: Software development, Video game development
- Founded: October 2, 1993; 33 years ago
- Headquarters: Banpo-daero 3, Seocho-gu, Seoul, South Korea
- Area served: Worldwide
- Key people: Sangwon Chung (CEO)
- Products: Perso AI, ALZip, Cabal Online, and 14 more
- Number of employees: 173 (2024)
- Website: www.estsoft.ai

Founded in 1993, ESTsoft is a South Korean application software development company. Its software ranges from desktop to business software for enterprises. ESTsoft listed on the KOSDAQ market in 2008 (ticker: 047560). The company develops and provides software and artificial intelligence (AI)-based services, including AI dubbing, virtual avatars, and AI search, mainly in a Software-as-a-Service (SaaS) format.

== History ==
ESTsoft was founded in 1993 in Seoul, South Korea, as a developer of desktop and business software.

During the 2000s, the company released a series of software products under the "ALTools" brand, including ALZip and ALSee, which became widely used among Korean PC users.

ESTsoft was listed on the KOSDAQ market in 2008 (ticker: 047560).

In the 2010s, the company expanded into the online gaming industry with titles such as Cabal Online and Cabal 2.

Since the early 2020s, ESTsoft has released artificial intelligence (AI) products including the AI dubbing platform "Perso AI," virtual avatar solutions, and the AI search engine "Alan."

In 2025, the company was selected for the Korean government's K-FAST initiative, which supports AI dubbing technology to globalize K-content.

In 2025, Perso Interactive was featured as an AI use case in the International Telecommunication Union's "AI for Good" Impact Report.

In December 2025, ESTsoft announced the launch of K-content FAST (free ad-supported streaming TV) channels for the global market, utilizing its AI dubbing technology on LG TV channels. The service includes channels such as "TRAVEL ON" and "GAME ON," with "FOOD ON" and a romantic comedy drama channel, "Series K," scheduled for launch on Samsung TV Plus in January 2026.

In January 2026, ESTsoft exhibited the AI Promoter with Samsung Electronics at CES 2026 during Samsung's "The First Look" event. "AI Promoter" integrates on-device AI and object recognition technologies to provide detailed information on Samsung's flagship products.

In February 2026, ESTsoft signed a MOU with NTT (Japan's largest telecommunications company) and Nihon Kotsu, a major Japanese taxi operator, to introduce its real-time conversational AI Avatar service, "Perso Interactive," into Japanese taxis. The partnership aims to provide foreign tourists with AI-powered services such as real-time interpretation, tourism information, and restaurant recommendations.

In March 2026, ESTsoft participated in the Mobile World Congress (MWC) in Barcelona to exhibit its real-time conversational AI Avatar service, "Perso Interactive." The company exhibited "Perso Interactive" across five dedicated zones (Mobility, Information, Retail Media, Customer Experience, Developer Ecosystem).

=== Government project K-EXAONE ===
In August 2025, ESTsoft was selected to participate in the "AI Foundation Model" project led by the Ministry of Science and ICT of the Republic of Korea.

In January 2026, ESTsoft successfully advanced to the second stage of the South Korean government's "Independent AI Foundation Model Project" as a member of the consortium led by LG AI Research. This consortium, which is developing the sovereign AI model K-EXAONE, received the highest score in the initial evaluation.

== Products ==
ESTsoft provides AI-based Software-as-a-Service (SaaS) solutions under its AI brand.

=== Perso AI ===
Perso AI is ESTsoft's group of three products, launched in 2024: Perso AI Dubbing (multilingual video dubbing), Studio Perso (virtual Avatar video creation), and AI Live Chat (interactive avatar service for real-time conversation).

==== Perso AI Dubbing ====
Perso AI Dubbing is a SaaS platform providing AI-based video dubbing and multilingual translation. In 2025, ESTsoft partnered with ElevenLabs to work on the platform. In November 2025, ESTsoft researchers presented an end-to-end multilingual dubbing framework based on Duration-based Translation (DT), which uses large language models to dynamically adjust phoneme counts for natural temporal alignment, at the EMNLP 2025 System Demonstrations track.

==== Studio Perso ====
Studio Perso is a virtual Avatar video creation service that generates AI-based avatar video from text input.

==== AI Live Chat ====
AI Live Chat is an interactive avatar service designed for real-time conversational interactions. Based on the same avatar technology used in Studio Perso, AI Live Chat provides conversational AI agents that can be embedded in websites.

=== Alan ===
Alan is an AI-powered search engine and generative assistant developed by ESTsoft.

=== ALTools ===
There are several products marketed under the "ALTools" product line. In Korea, "Al" means "egg", and numerous products under this category have egg-themed icons and mascots. ALTools products include:

- ALZip – a compression and archiving utility, supporting several archiving formats, including ISO
- ALFTP – an FTP client and server
- ALSee – an image viewer and photo editor
- ALPass – a password manager for web sites (update service ended)
- ALGIF – a GIF animation program (update ended)
- ALSong – an MP3 player which supports online content
- ALShow – a media player
- ALMap – a family of digital map viewers and GPS (both software and hardware) (update ended)
- ALX – digital rights management software
- ALToolbar – a toolbar for Internet Explorer
- ALYac – an antivirus based on BitDefender engine

Other ESTsoft products include:

- InternetDISK – online storage solution
- iDisk – A version of InternetDISK designed for ISPs to host larger amounts of data
- iMan – instant messaging software
- Cabal Online – a massively multiplayer online role-playing game
- Cabal 2 – a massively multiplayer online role-playing game
- HeroesGo (also known as Howling Sword) – a massively multiplayer online role-playing game
