= Taiwan eSports League =

Sports League based in Taiwan

- Sport: StarCraft II; Kart Rider; Special Force II
- Founded: 2008
- Director: Alex Wang Chuang-Ying
- President: Huang Po-Hun
- No. of teams: Six
- Country: Taiwan
- Broadcasters: Videoland Television Network; Fox Sports 3
- Website: www.esports.com.tw

The Taiwan eSports League (TeSL) (Chinese: 台灣電子競技聯盟) is an eSports league in Taiwan. TeSL was the first to have live StarCraft II games on national TV.

== Teams ==
- Flash Wolves (Formerly 7-Elevens Ironmen, Xpec Ironmen, and Yoe Ironmen/Flash Wolves or Taichung Flash Wolves)
- Gama Bears
- Kaohsiung Ocean Stars
- Tainan Phoenix
- New Taipei City Gold Ore
- Taipei Capital
- Tt Apollos
- Taoyuan Jets (no longer part of the Starcraft II league since 2011)
- Wayi Spiders

== Coverage ==
TeSL Games are broadcast on the platforms Twitch and Youtube in Mandarin, Taiwanese, and English.

The Special Force II Pro League is broadcast on Fox Sports 3. The inaugural season began on October 2, 2015.
