= Dragonfly (company) =

South Korean video game developer and publisher

Dragonfly Co., Ltd.
- Industry: Video games
- Founded: February 1995
- Headquarters: Nonhyeon-dong, Seoul, South Korea
- Website: www.dragonflygame.com

Dragonfly is a South Korean video game developer and publisher based in Seoul. While a small company, it is notable for releasing many popular games both in Korea and globally including Special Force and Karma and still continue to release games both domestically and abroad. Besides video games, the company has also branched into other industries including biotechnology and webtoon publishing.

== Games ==
=== PC games ===
- Karma
- Path of Destiny 2: Valpurgis Night
- The Tour of Duty
- Fly Anpan Man
- Fly Anpan Man 2

=== Online games ===
- Karma: Online (a.k.a. Karma: Immortality) 2002
- Special Force (a.k.a. Soldier Front) 2004
- Karma 2: Online (co-developed with Blueside and Futureport. Alternate titles: Karma: Returns, Karma: Operation Barbarossa, Karma: Prisoners of the dead) 2009
- Quake Wars: Online 2010
- Metal Slug Zero: Online (co-developed with Wiz Hands) 2010
- Special Force 2 (a.k.a. Soldier Front 2) 2011
- Soldier of Fortune: Online 2011
- The King of Fighters: Online 2013
- Superstar Fighter 2015
- Bolts & Blip: Online Cancelled
- Special Force: Double Take 2024
- Special Force: Remastered in development
- Ban Online 2
- Van Online
- Saem Online

=== Mobile games ===
- Accelerated Scandal for Kakao
- Special Force: First Mission
- Grandpas Over Flowers for Kakao
- Special Force for Kakao
- STYLE POP
- Gadius Empire
- Special Force M: Invasion (a.k.a. Special Force M: Remastered) 2020
- Special Force M: Revolution (a.k.a. Special Force M: Battlefield to Survive) 2020
- Ador: Guardian Goddess 2024

=== VR/AR games ===
- ABC once a day
- Tobot VR
- Special Force VR
