= Ghost Online =

2006 video game

- Developer: Netgame
- Publishers: MGame, Netgame, OurGame, GameFlier, Gemscool
- Platform: Windows
- Genres: Fantasy, Massively Multiplayer Online Game
- Mode: MMO

Ghost Online, also known as Ghost Soul and GO, was a free-to-play side-scrolling massively multiplayer online role-playing game, originally released on December 30, 2006. It was developed by Netgame (a division of MGAME USA Inc.).

The game was available for several specific countries and regions in Asia, the United States, and worldwide, which almost all were shut down. The game is currently only available in South Korea.

In the game, players defend the "World" from ghost monsters and develop their character's skills and abilities, like in most other role-playing games. There is a soul system that allows players absorb souls from monsters. Players can interact with others in many ways, such as through chatting, trading. Groups of players can band together in parties to hunt monsters, and share the rewards. Players can fight each other with the game PvP system. Players can also band in a guild to battle with other guilds. Ghost Online also many quests, some of which allow the player to obtain new skills.

== Story ==
Lord Tai He and his apprentices rid the world of Demons, but Tai He himself had used forbidden magic that corrupted his soul. So he had to go to the western lands, to find the sacred herb to cleanse it. The player is Tai He for a short time, learning the basics in Batu Caves. After defeating a clone, Tai He eats the herb, dies and is reborn as your character.

== Gameplay ==
Ghost Online is a side-scrolling MMORPG. There are six character classes in the game. The main source of gold (in-game currency) and experience points are the monsters in the game. They are found in most fields outside of the cities and towns, and portals leading to maps with monsters (usually from a town) are colored red.

== Shutdown ==
As of June 3, 2009, the game was shut down (USA version), with two other games, which are The Legend of Ares and Holic online, by Mgame USA. The reason for termination was that the three games were not producing enough revenue. Ghost Online Malaysia was shut down on 31 August 2009. The Vietnam version also shut down on January 31, 2009. The game was re-released in June 2012, under the name Soul Saver Online with a few minor changes. Thailand version ㄴhut down on March 11, 2014.

== Sequels ==
A mobile sequel, Gwihon Soul Saver, was released on 2 May 2018. It was later re-developed by Retro Future as Soul Saver: Idle RPG, a blockchain game in cooperation with Netmarble's subsidiary Metaverse World. It was launched on 5 April 2019.

Another mobile sequel, Gwihon M, was developed by Mgame and released on 21 November 2024 for iOS and Android. A mobile MMORPG, Ghost Online Idle, will be released in November 2026.

== Official game websites ==
- Official Korean Site
- Official North American Site
- Official Taiwan Ghost Online Website
