= Special Force (2004 video game) =

- Developer: DragonFly GF Co., Ltd.
- Publishers: DragonFly GF Co., Ltd. True Digital Plus; LaMate Taiwan; Asiasoft Online Pte Ltd XI‘AN SKY Online Co., Ltd.
- Platform: Microsoft Windows
- Release: KR: July 2004; TH: April 2006; TW: October 2006; JP: November 2006; NA: February 2007; CN: May 2007; PH: March 2008; EU: October 2009; SG: September 2010; BR: February 2011; ID: August 2011; VN: June 2005; PH: December 2021 (Rush)
- Genre: First-person shooter
- Mode: Multiplayer

Special Force (Korean: 스페셜포스, named Soldier Front in North America) is an online free-to-play first-person shooter game developed by the South Korean video game developer Dragonfly, which is based in Seoul. Although a small company, it is notable for releasing many popular games both inside and outside Korea, including: Special Force and Karma.

== Gameplay ==
Special Force provides several game modes including team battle (bomb planting, escaping, object stealing, etc.), single battle, team deathmatch, and horror mode. Most modes consist of a red team and a blue team, with the exceptions of a single battle, training, and horror mode. The game allows for a maximum of 16 users to be in the same room playing together.

Players can purchase and utilize a range of character forces, including French GIGN, German GSG 9, Malaysian PASKAL, Republic of Korea Marine Corps, US Army Delta Force, and Russian Spetsnaz. Players may also rent equipment for speed and armor. Various modern-themed weapons are available. Weapons have durability and must be repaired often. They cannot be modified like in other first-person shooters, but once they are purchased, they are permanent and stay in the inventory until the player sells them.

Players rank up after receiving enough experience points, gained after each match, with bonus rewards at certain ranks.

=== Graphics update ===
On July 14, 2009, Dragonfly provided a patch to the Korean version which consisted of a redesigned user interface and reorganized game items for the celebration of the game's 5th anniversary. Along with this, many of the older weapons' graphics were updated. This patch was applied to all other versions of the game within the following year.

== Game Modes ==
Special Force currently has 11 modes available in the North American version of the game.

- Training – Targets are placed everywhere on the map for players to shoot down. This mode is used for practicing aims and strategies.
- Single Battle – A free for all mode, the first player who reaches the set number of points wins.
- Team Battle – Red team must complete the objective while the blue team must stop the red team. Depending on the map, the objective could be planting the bomb, escaping the map, or retrieving an object.
- Clan Battle – Same as Team Battle except the red team must be all from the same clan and the same goes for the blue team. Clans are not able to face each other. This mode is often played in 5 vs 5.
- Team Deathmatch – The team that reaches 100 points first wins the round. Each kill grants 2 points and special kills will grant extra points.
- CTC – One player from each team is selected as the Captain who will be granted extra HP, along with an oversized head. The team to defeat the opponent's Captain wins the round.
- CTC 2 – Similar to CTC, except every player will be a Captain. The team to defeat all the Captains on the opposing team wins the round.
- Horror Mode – In each round, some players are selected as zombies. Zombies must kill all humans while humans try to stay alive until the time limit is up. Humans that get killed before the time limit will turn into a zombie. Zombies win the round if no humans are left alive while humans win the round when at least one survives by the time limit.
- Sniper – Players are only allowed to use sniper rifles and knives on this mode's exclusive maps. The team that kills all the opposing team members wins the round. With a premium item, there is an option to allow secondary weapons.
- Rage Mode – The team that reaches the target points first wins the match. Every time a player is killed, their rage meter increases. Once the rage meter is maxed, the player is given extra HP in order to take revenge.
- Horror Mode 2 – Teams switch from zombies and players each round. The team that reaches the target points first wins the round. There are additional zombies compared to Horror Mode.
- Pirate Mode – To win a player must get 500 points and conquer each of the treasures.

The game modes of Single Battle, Team Battle, and Clan Battle offer the option of restricting weapons to sniper rifles only, but this feature requires the host to have a premium item.

== Sequels ==
The second iteration of the game, Special Force II, uses Unreal Engine 3. Aeria Games announced in March 2013 that Special Force 2 would be released in the North American market as Soldier Front 2. In August 2015 Aeria Games closed the North American version of the game and in October 2016 the publishing rights for the North American version of the game were handed to Gameforge. The game was re-released in North America under the same name as other regions. The European and North American versions of the game were owned by Gameforge until August 20, 2018, when the North American and European versions of the game were closed.

A remaster of the 2004 video game was released on 25 March 2026 for Windows via Steam and Epic Games Store. Park Cheolseung, the founder of Dragonfly and developer of the original game, returned to produce the remaster.

== Professional leagues ==
S.K.I.L.L. – Special Force 2 is a professional league run by Electronic Sports League in Western Europe that began in 2013. The Special Force II Pro League in Taiwan that is run by Taiwan eSports League and broadcast on Fox Sports 3. The inaugural season kicked off on October 2, 2015.

== See also ==
- ijji
- Aeria Games and Entertainment
