= AIKA Online =

2009 video game

- Logo for Aika Online
- Developer(s): Joy Impact; HanbitSoft
- Publisher(s): HanbitSoft; GameNet; HAPPYTUK; CBM Interactive
- Release: 2009
- Genre(s): MMORPG
- Mode(s): Multiplayer

AIKA Online is a free-to-play MMORPG published by HanbitSoft in South Korea, GameNet in Russia, HAPPYTUK in Taiwan, CBM Interactive in the global market and in Brazil.

== Information ==
Aika features PvP capabilities and over a thousand quests along with standard MMORPG features like dungeon-running and crafting. The game is optimized for large-scale Nation Wars where thousands of players can fight at one time in massive combat. The players can fight for control over their nations during a Castle Siege, attack enemy nations to capture their magical artifacts, and participate in a variety of exciting PvP endeavors in the battlegrounds.

== Story ==
The great goddess Aika created the world of Arcan to become a utopia for its inhabitants. Her first creation were the Scinic's, a kind and gentle race that cared for the land. However, as the Scinic race had no purpose in life, they begged the goddess for their existence to end and in sorrow, the goddess granted their wish. Believing that the good-natured Scinic race was too good, she created the Human race in which was a balance of good and evil that allowed them to thrive. As time went on, however, human ambition led to the destruction of the land, greatly angering the goddess. In response, she created a race of demons called Zereca that drew from her powers to punish the humans. However, she deeply regretted this action when the Zereca nearly caused the extinction of the Human race. To salvage her second creation, she told the Human prophet Giovanni to gather his people to a region known as Lakia. There she lifted the land of Lakia into the sky with the last of her strength. Spent of her powers, Aika fell into a deep slumber which greatly weakened the Zereca. However, three hundred years later, the goddess begins to awaken and as she does, the Zereca begins to regain their strength. To counteract this, the goddess creates a special warrior class within the Humans known as the Aitan and a fairy-like race to serve these Aitan called Pran.

== Nations ==
Aika divides the player base into 5 factions or nations for purposes of PvP. They are Alethius, Feonir, Lenaria, Vanov, and Ostyrion. Each nation possesses its own flag but share the same map and set of quests. Players start off nationless and eventually become a citizen of a nation by completing a quest at level 10. Players may traverse between nations by use of the rift in Rhawn Crossroads. Players can also freely attack and kill other players from other nations.

Each civilian which is Legion (Guild) Master can fight over Lord Marshal position on Castle Siege War every Saturday. The Guild Alliance of the Lord Marshal guild will become Archon. There are 3 Archon spot which all have different benefit or responsibility: Military Archon, Judicial Archon, and Treasury Archon. Lord Marshal have all benefit of each Archon position.

Alliance between 2 nation is possible through Lord Marshal or Archon of each nation agreement. Alliance doesn't have automated targeting, just like same citizen but with flag above character nickname, with exception of adding as friend and guild invitation. Alliance benefit from ally nation relic as long as they stay in the ally nation. A teleport to ally city Rehenschein is available at the bottom left of Regenschein map. Each week, a nation is selected as power nation based on relic activity and can't form alliance in one week period. But in some cases, de facto alliance are formed between power nation and other nation with a risk of friendly fire, or an alliance formed between 3 nation excluding power nation.

== Classes ==
There are a total of three overall class types and six different classes. The classes are gender locked, each with their own unique set of skills and specific specialties.

Melee Fighters

- Warrior (male)
- Paladin (female)

Ranged DPS

- Riflemen (male)
- Dual Gunner (female)

Spellcasters

- Warlock (male)
- Cleric (female)
