= Elyon (video game) =

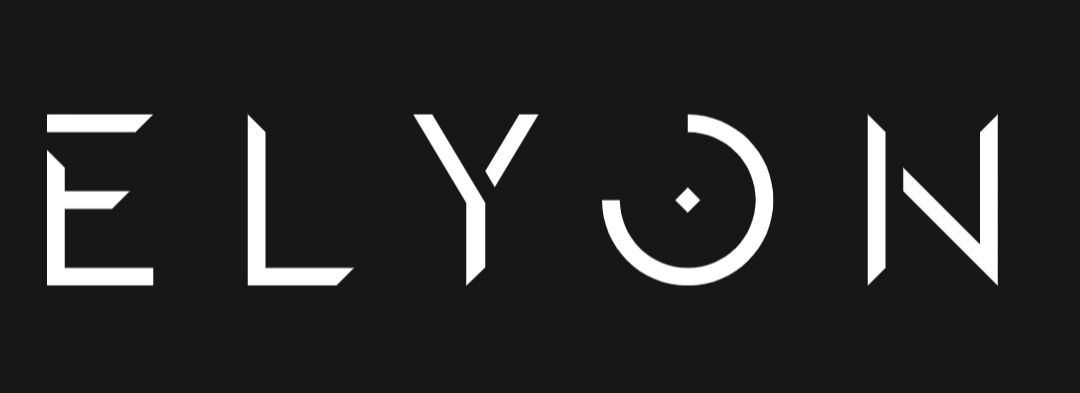
- Developer: Bluehole Studio (Krafton)
- Publishers: KOR: Kakao Games; NA: Kakao Games; EU: Kakao Games; SEA: Asiasoft; JP: Neowiz/Pmang
- Engine: Unreal Engine 3
- Platform: Microsoft Windows
- Release: KOR: 10 December 2020; NA/EU: 20 October 2021
- Genre: MMORPG
- Mode: Multiplayer

Elyon (formerly known as Ascent: Infinite Realm) was a massively multiplayer online role-playing game developed by Bluehole and published by Kakao Games. The game has focused on dynamic combat between two Realms, Vulpin, and Ontari, with players using diverse skill combinations based on the non-targeting system.

== Release ==
Elyon was released in Korea on December 10, 2020.

On October 20, 2021, Elyon was released in the EU/NA. The game was made free-to-play even before the release and those who had pre-ordered it got some compensation. The game ran in the West for less than a year before the publisher announced its closure. The game was discontinued in the EU and NA on December 7, 2022.

It was also announced that the game was shutting down in Korea on 2 March 2023. ELYON SEA was shut down on 27 April 2023, leaving Japan as the last region where the game was available at the time. Beginning September 19, Elyon was shut down in Japan by its publisher Pmang, ending Elyon's existence in any capacity.
