= Kim Jae-yeon =

Kim Jae-yeon may refer to:

- Kim Jae-yeon (water polo)
- Kim Jae-yeon (politician)

== See also ==
- Kim Jae-young (disambiguation)
