= Gunster: Rain of Bullets =

2006 video game

- Developer: NHN Corp.
- Publisher: NHN Corp.
- Platform: Windows
- Release: September 13, 2006 (Closed Beta); October 18, 2006 (Official Release)
- Genre: 2D Run and gun
- Modes: Single-player, multiplayer

Gunster: Rain of Bullets was a 2D multiplayer action video game, created by Korean-based company NHN who in turn hosted the game using the North American portal named ijji. One other version of Gunster exists, named Gunstrike R: Reloaded Bullets and was hosted at Hangame Japan.

Gunster: Rain of Bullets is a port from a Korean game of the same name and was hosted directly by Hangame, which both localizations were shut down. Minor differences exist between the two localizations, but the biggest difference is that they are managed independently of one another.

On February 14, 2007, ijji shutdown Gunster's servers for undeclared reasons. At the time, many players presumed it was due to the presence of a lot of in-game hacking and cheating, however, no clarification was ever given.

== Gameplay ==
Gunster is a sidescroller, or run and gun game.

Characters are avatars for players and can also change certain statistics. Each character has a value for their statistics, one for health, booster and speed. Health changes the maximum amount of health, booster changes the amount of booster, and speed changes the horizontal movement speed of the character. There were nine available characters.

Chrome is the currency of Gunster, which is gained through the completion of missions and rewarded for doing well in matches. Chrome can also be acquired through battling other non-NPC players in Battle Mode. Each player is rewarded an amount based on how well they had performed during a game. Survival mode gave chrome based on how long the player stayed alive. Chrome could only be used in the store for the purchase of characters, weapons, equipment and items.

Every time a player finishes a mission or game, they are rewarded with experience points. Higher levels allowed access to more items from the shop. The character being played does not affect the level or experience gained. Experience points gained through missions are given by a specific amount for the mission, plus an additional amount based on the number of kills. In Battle mode experience gained is proportional only to what rank a player is, if their team won or lost and how long the mission was.

Ladder points are proportional to what rank a player is, if their team won or lost, how long the mission lasted, and the player's current level.

Licenses are required by players to obtain access to other areas and modes of the game. Players begin the game without any licenses and must complete a tutorial mode before gaining access to the different multiplayer modes.

Players must progress through each mode of Gunster in sequence. Medals are gained by completing levels or for good performance in battles. Once earned, users can insert medals into medal cards; when completed, the cards can be transformed into various rewards based on the card used. There are only two types of medals currently rewarded: iron and bronze.

In-game power-ups allow players to get a distinct advantage over challenges and players. They appear in two different ways, depending on the game mode. In challenge mode and battle mode, power-ups appear in either fixed or random locations with each location producing either a specific power-up or one by random. Mission mode power-ups are obtained by defeating an enemy with the possibility of producing special power-ups specific to the game mode.

A store enables players to purchase new characters, weapons, miscellaneous items, and equipment where most of the items available were locked by a level prerequisite. Weapons can be purchased for a week or permanently. Equipment involves passively active equipment that modifies a players statistics and capabilities; for instance giving a laser sight to sniper rifles when the laser scope is equipped. Other types of equipment include bulletproof vests (which reduce damage by a percentage) and booster effects (which change the color of the booster).

Weapons come in two forms - guns and grenades - but can be used in various ways. For example, two guns can be carried by a player in certain modes (one held and the other holstered); each can be dropped and then replaced by a different gun found on the ground. Guns are categorized by type: Rifles, Submachine guns, Sniper Rifles, Shotguns, Grenade Launchers, and Machine Guns. The most basic of each type (available at all levels) are AK-47's, Ingram Mac 10's, Scouts, Benelli M3 Super 90s, M79s, and MG42s. Examples of non-default weapons are the M4A1 Colt under the Rifle categorization and the Laser Gun which is under the Sniper Rifle categorization. Notice that these categorizations are proven by the fact that when players disabled weapon types in-game, the latter were affected. There are also two special power up weapons that are temporary, lasting until the end of the match or until depleted. These weapons, the flamethrower and rocket launcher, are more powerful than other weapons and usually give players the upper hand.

Grenades, on the other hand, can be replaced by special grenades if a player had purchased them. The Gunster manual informed players that five grenades would be given over the standard four if a power up was used. This was not true as the extra slots remained locked in an unchanged state alongside the standard amount of three.
