= With Your Destiny =

2003 video game

- Developers: JoyImpact Co., Ltd.
- Publishers: JoyImpact Co., Ltd. Raid Hut Ltd. Vibrant Communications Ltd. (2008-2019); HanbitSoft Inc.
- Platform: PC
- Release: May 2003
- Genre: Fantasy MMORPG
- Mode: Multiplayer

With Your Destiny, often referred to as WYD, is a Free-to-play Scandinavian-based MMORPG developed by JoyImpact Co., Ltd., and was published and marketed worldwide by HanbitSoft Inc. in May 2003. It is also known as Supreme Destiny in Malaysia and the Philippines. In 2025, WYD M, the game's mobile version, was released.

== Publisher ==
In February 2019, JoyImpact licensed Raid Hut, a Brazilian game publisher, as its sole official global publisher and terminated the contract with Vibrant Games due to breaches. JoyImpact also publishes the game, which has a South Korea-based server, and started planning to remake the game from Q1 2019, including updated graphics, new class, and contents. Raid Hut is taking action on game piracy by taking down the websites of illegal servers (private servers) on Google search and disabling their social media websites.

== Plot ==
In the story of With Your Destiny, the Supreme Beings Yetzirah and Tzfah joined forces to create a world where mankind could triumph. In this plan, two great rival kingdoms disputed the dominion of the continent of Kersef: Hekalotia and Akeronia. While the realms were distracted by endless battles, a confrontation between the deities threatened to annihilate all Kersef. In this raid, players must master new skills and weapons and form powerful guilds to face the greatest of all threats: the fury of two supreme gods.

== Gameplay ==
With Your Destiny has various modes of wars, divided into three:

- Castle Wars: All players can participate with their respective guilds, form alliances, and choose the attack tactics in a war of up to 1000 simultaneous players.
- City Conquests: Groups of 26 vs. 26 dispute the dominance of the main cities of the game.
- Battle of Kingdoms: similar to a MOBA, each team must make its way to victory facing the challenges of the map, in addition to the Tournaments between players.

Key systems include:

- Integrated macro system: Automated attack, skill, and hunting functions.
- Infinite progression: Over 1500 levels to reach, players can evolve from a mortal to a supreme celestial being.
- 4 Custom Classes (Characters): Transknight, Hunter, Foema, and Beastmaster.
- Highly customizable builds: Players can create strategies, combining attributes, and more than 150 skills.
- PVP: Several competitive modes of up to 1000 players.
- Craft and Trade system: Players can loot items and trade with other players, including mounts.
- Guild Ranking System: Guilds can fight each other to climb the ranks and dominate the server.
- Solo or Party gameplay: Players can play alone through quests, dungeons, and activities or create a party to fight monsters and receive better rewards.
