= Kakao Games =

South Korean video game publisher

Kakao Games Corp.
- Formerly: Daum Games
- Type: Division
- Industry: Video games
- Headquarters: Jeju, South Korea
- Area served: Worldwide
- Parent: Kakao
- Subsidiaries: Action Square (10.4%); XLGAMES (52.97%); AdPage (Note: joint venture with Kakao Entertainment)
- Website: kakaogames.com/en-us/ (English) game.kakao.com game.daum.net

Kakao Games Corp. (Korean: 카카오게임즈) is a South Korean video game publisher and a subsidiary of Kakao. It specializes in developing and publishing games on PC, mobile, and VR platforms. Each is represented by Namgoong Hoon and Cho Gye-hyun.

Originally known as Daum Games before the acquisition of Daum, Kakao Games has expanded from game distribution solely in Korea. Now, Kakao Games distributes its games globally throughout North America, Europe, and other parts of Asia thanks in part to its social aspect with KakaoTalk. Kakao uses the game portal of Daum and social network of KakaoTalk to connect players within their games.

== History ==
In September 2020, Kakao Games debuted on the KOSDAQ. In 2025, Kakao Games sold its stakes in Sena Technologies and Kakao VX. In 2026, LAAA Investment became Kakao Games' biggest shareholder.

== Games ==
Year	Title	Developer	Notes	Ref.
2013	Cookie Run	Devsisters	Publishing deal since April 2, 2013	
2015	Black Desert Online	Pearl Abyss	Published under Daum Games. Publishing rights handed over to Pearl Abyss after February 24, 2021.	
2018	Lord of Dice	NGEL Games		
2018	BanG Dream! Girls Band Party!	Craft Egg	Publishing deal in Korea since February 2018 and ended January 2024	
2018	Moonlight Sculptor	XL Games		
2018	Friends Racing	Kakao Games		
2019	Path of Exile	Grinding Gear Games	Publishing deal in Korea since March 2019	
2020	Guardian Tales	Kong Studios		
2020	Elyon	Krafton		
2021	Eternal Return	Nimble Neuron	Publishing deal started July 2021 and ended July 2024	
2021	World Flipper	Cygames		
2021	Friends Racing Duo	Kakao Games		
2021	ArcheAge	XL Games	Publishing deal since December 1, 2021 for EU and NA.	
2023	Eversoul	NINEARK		
2025	ArcheAge Chronicles	XL Games		
2026	Dokkaebi World	Supercat		

=== Cancelled Games ===
Title screen of Capcom Super League Online

Kakao Games was to be the publisher for Capcom Super League Online, a tactical role-playing game for Android and iOS phones developed by Capcom Entertainment Korea that was planned for release in South Korea only. The character-collecting game allowed the player to recruit from an all-star cast of characters from different Capcom IPs to fight against various villains. A closed beta test of the Android version was conducted from 4–7 October 2018. The game was scrapped due to an unspecified "business decision" between Kakao Games and Capcom, which also closed down its Korean branch.
