= Redbana Corporation =

Online video game company

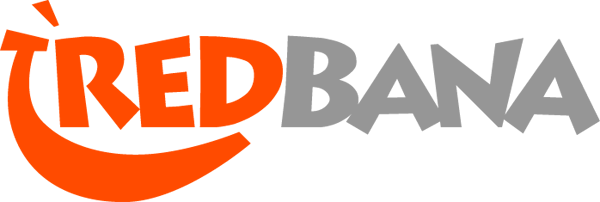
- Type: Gaming
- Industry: Game developer and publisher
- Genre: Casual MMORPGs gaming company
- Founded: 2008
- Headquarters: Irvine, California
- Area served: North America (Redbana US)
- Key people: Jun Hyun Kim
- Products: Online games
- Revenue: $12 million
- Number of employees: 62
- Website: www.redbana.com

Redbana Corporation (commonly known as Redbana) is a publisher of online games and MMORPGs.

== History ==
Jun Hyun Kim who is C.E.O. of REDBANA U.S. and Philippines that was established in 2008. It was officially launched with the re-release of Audition in April 2009. Audition was originally launched with Nexon Corporation in 2007, but due to Nexon's closing of the game, Redbana bought the license for Audition. In August 2009, Redbana announced plans to release a new game called Mythos.

- March 23, 2009: Redbana site is launched.
- April 14, 2009: Forums are launched.
- April 17, 2009: Redbana and Bana Cash system is live.
- August 2009: Redbana Mythos Website along with Closed Beta registration is available.
- November 25, 2010: Redbana site and game server are down due to hardware issues. Game service restored on December 1. Forums rolled back to August 2010
- April 2012: Mythos has closed
- January 2013: Redbana Forums is redesigned and updated

== BANA Cash ==
Redbana, similar to other gaming companies, uses the Virtual Asset Sales system. Redbana names their in-game currency "BANA cash".

Users may buy BANA cash by credit card, PayPal, Open Bucks (gift cards), a GoCash prepaid card, or Steam Wallet.

Target discontinued carrying the official Redbana Prepaid card mid-2010.

== Redbana Divisions ==
There was another Redbana website in Taiwan (now renamed T3 Taiwan), found at redbana.tw. Redbana released a global site on August 27, 2009. Redbana Global released "Camon Hero" the same day the website was live. On March 5, 2010, Redbana Global announced that the URL redbanaglobal.com would no longer exist as of April 6 and will be moved to www.t3fun.com. They have announced they will transfer all data of "Camon Hero", but there will be a new Terms of Service and Privacy policy. They have also announced three new additions: "Grand Mer", "Mythos", and "워크라이 (Warcry)".

Redbana Philippines is a distributor of Hanbit Soft games such as Tantra and WYD. This leads to the other the logo, Gamebana. It was established to be a Global game distributor rather than one particular part of the world, but no longer exists. This division has no relation to T3 Entertainment.

=== Mythos North-American Development [closed] ===
Although the Mythos MMORPG closed beta phase of development was announced to be coming "very soon" by Redbana on their forums around December 2009, no date or real feedback from the company has yet been released. There were periodic attempts by Redbana representatives and forum moderators throughout 2010 to revive interest in the upcoming game, but eventually the community at large grew steadily dissatisfied and most stopped participating on the Mythos forum. A long overdue update from Redbana on Jan 7, 2011 stipulated that the North-American version is still in the works, although no clear release date has yet been mentioned.

== Games ==
CardMon Hero
