= Soul of the Ultimate Nation =

- S.U.N. Japanese promotional poster
- Developer: Webzen
- Publishers: Webzen (Korea, South America, Australia, Europe, rest of Asia); The9 (China); GameOn (Japan); NHN (North America & UK) via ijji Ingamba (Russia)
- Composer: Howard Shore
- Platform: Windows
- Release: April 19, 2007 (Taiwan); May 24, 2007 (China), April 21, 2008 (Japan), October 21, 2009 (Europe, South America, Australia, rest of Asia), late 2009 (North America), 2011 (Russia)
- Genre: Fantasy MMORPG
- Mode: MMO

Soul of the Ultimate Nation (often abbreviated as S.U.N.) was a fantasy-based massive multiplayer online role-playing game (MMORPG) produced by Webzen, a Korean-based company. It was operated in South Korea by Webzen and in mainland China by The9. The game was launched in Taiwan on April 19, and in China on May 24, 2007 as a paid online service and closed on July 3, 2013.

In December 2005, Webzen sold an export contract for the game to The9 for US$13 million in total, which at the time was the largest single export transaction in Korea's online game history. In 2006, S.U.N. was selected as the most anticipated online game at the 2nd Annual 'Best Online Game Selection' in China. In a survey by Gametrics, the largest Internet cafe survey website in Korea, S.U.N. was ranked among the top 10 games in Korean Internet cafes. Also, S.U.N. received the award at the Digital Contents Awards by Ministry of Information and Communication and SK Telecom in 2006.

== Gameplay ==
Like some other MMORPGs, S.U.N. utilised the "hack and slash" way. Players were part of a rebel group known as "The Guidance". Items could be strengthened and upgraded throughout the game play of SUN. For large-scale combat such as siege warfare, Soul of the Ultimate Nation utilised a combat map with partitions that divided players into multiple fields each containing 20-40 characters; the outcome of each battle having direct effects on the combat occurring on other fields. SUN also allowed players to strategically set the stage for battles by choosing different types of maps, entry numbers, degrees of difficulty and types of monsters for a customized game play experience. SUN had three types of specified maps using a zone map system. Players started the game in a city and had to create zones to play the game. In terms of maps, the mission maps were the primary places where players can solve missions. The hunting maps were for tracking down monsters to level up characters, gather items and acquire in-game money. The quest maps were used to fulfill quests and to help users better understand the overall scenario of the game.

The game underwent four stages of beta from September 2005 to May 2006 in South Korea, and received high marks from gamers. S.U.N. Taiwan moved from closed beta to open beta in December 2006. The final open beta allowed game developers to improve the field maps, add a competitive hunting system and a mission ranking system.

SUN Korea adopted F2P mode and item mall model in November 2006. NHN USA Corp., the publisher of SUN in North America made a license agreement with Webzen in May 2009.

S.U.N. was available for distribution and operation in North America through the gaming corporation ijji. A beta test of Webzen's version was held from October 14-16, 2009. Webzen's S.U.N. version came out five days later.

== Soundtrack ==
The soundtrack for this MMORPG was composed by Howard Shore.
