= Eternal Return (video game) =

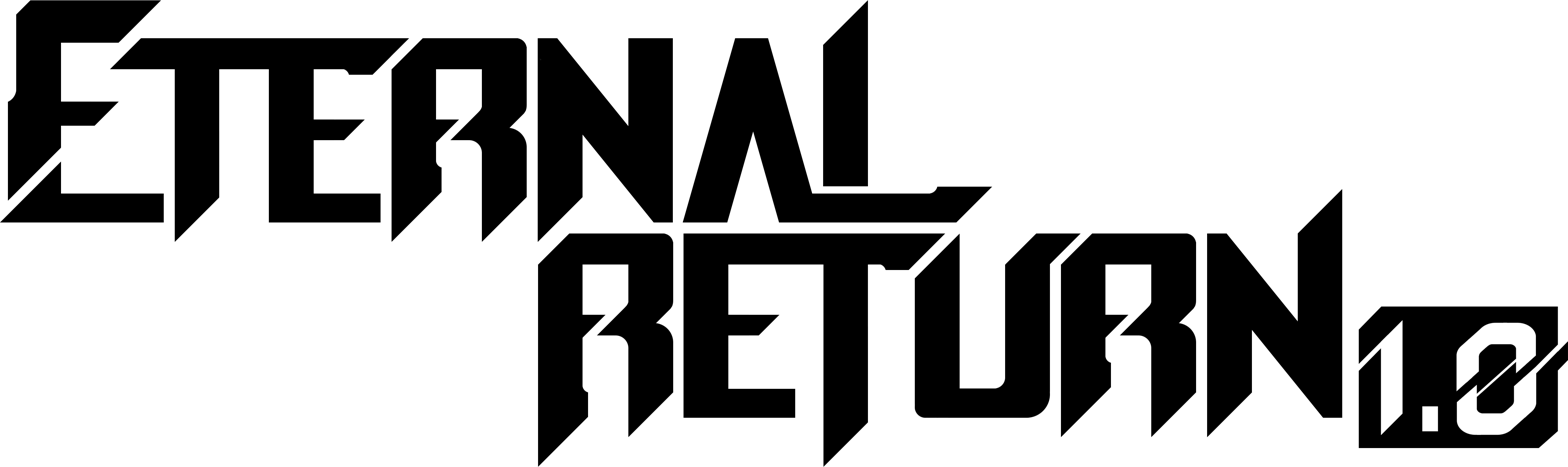
- Developer: Nimble Neuron
- Publishers: SapStaR Games (China); Nimble Neuron (Global)
- Engine: Unity
- Platform: Microsoft Windows
- Release: July 20, 2023
- Genre: Battle royale
- Mode: Multiplayer

Eternal Return (formerly Eternal Return: Black Survival) is a multiplayer battle royale game developed by Nimble Neuron and published by Kakao Games. The game was released in early access on October 14, 2020. Eternal Return features a mix of multiplayer online battle arena gameplay with survival game elements. A player can choose one of the many characters already released and is pitted against 21 other players with their two teammates to survive and battle on an island called Lumia, with the last player standing being the winner. The game is available for Microsoft Windows via Steam.

== Gameplay ==
Eternal Return is a multiplayer online battle arena (MOBA) and battle royale game where players compete against one another. Players can choose their player characters with unique gameplay style and select game modes. For example, the Cobalt Protocol mode is a 4-on-4 battle that relies on fast-paced combat.

The maps are part of its setting, Lumia Island. Players collect materials from various containers, slain animals or other players, or from various unique points around the map to create stronger weapons or equipment. Players have to survive until they are the last one standing. The game's launch had the solos and duos game modes removed due to not having sufficient player base to fill multiple queues, Only Squads [Teams of 3] and Cobalt Protocol [4v4] modes were left permanently enabled. Lone Wolf, a solo event game mode, makes scheduled temporary rotations into the game. It consists of 18-players with custom rules and a faster pace.

== Plot ==
Eternal Return is set on Lumia Island, a secluded island with various named zones. A scientific organization known as AGLAIA is hosting an experiment with human test subjects to further evolve and create an elite species of humans. After each experiment, the test subjects have their memories wiped, with few exceptions.

== Development and release ==
Eternal Return is developed by South Korean company Nimble Neuron and is developed in Unity. It is a sequel to Black Survival (2015). The developer wanted to expand the 2D maps from Black Survival into the 3D versions for immersion effect, allowing players to follow what's going on. While the original Black Survival was a MOBA-style game, Eternal Return became a combination between a MOBA and a battle royal.

In 2021, the developer partnered with Kakao Games to publish Eternal Return in Korea. In 2021, a music video featuring K-pop group aespa was created for the domestic launch of the Kakao Games client. The game entered early access on Steam on 14 October 2020, and officially launched on 20 July 2023. In July 2024, the partnership with Kakao games ended.
