= ALZip =

Archive and compression software

- Developer: ESTsoft
- Initial release: 1999
- Stable release: 12.22 / 7 February 2024
- Written in: C++ (MFC)
- Operating system: Windows 7 or later
- Available in: Korean, English, etc.
- Type: File archiver
- License: Shareware/Freeware (only non-commercial use)
- Website: altools.co.kr

ALZip is an archive and compression utility software application developed by ESTsoft for Microsoft Windows that can unzip forty different archive file formats. ALZip can also archive files into eight different archive formats. Introduced in ALZip version 8, their own proprietary ALZ and EGG archive formats can be used, which supports Unicode, compression and other features.

== History ==
ALZip was developed in 1999 as an internal application by the South Korean software company ESTsoft in response to employees' frustration using the English interface in WinZip.

The Korean interface was immediately well received and later that year, ALZip was publicly released as freeware. In just over a year, ALZip became the most popular archiver program in South Korea and by December 2001, was the top downloaded software in the country. By 2004, it had reached a 70% market share in South Korea. The popularity of the software and the ALZ and EGG archive format played a large role in earning ESTsoft a place in the Digital Innovation Awards Top 100 Companies in South Korea with the software taking special mention.

The first English version was released in 2002. Since then, support for over 20 languages has been added.

Version 11.07 is available through Microsoft Store.

== Licensing changes ==
ALZip was originally released as pure freeware. In October 2001 it changed to free for home use with government usage requiring a software license. In April 2002, a business license was also introduced for commercial usage. Licensing was based on the honor system, and there were no nag screens.

With the version 7 release, the license was changed from freeware to adware, displaying downloaded banner ads. Beginning on December 1, 2008, all new releases are shareware requiring a paid license except in its original Korean language, which requires no licensing fee.

With version 8.51 from 22 August 2012, ALZip changed the license so that it can be licensed freely. On the download page of ALZip is a serial number to copy and paste when you start the program, in order to have the license for the software free of charge.

== Naming and mascots ==
The name "ALZip" was chosen as the "AL" part is a transliteration from the program's Korean name "aljip" (Hangul: 알집), literally EggZip. Other ALTools feature similar egghead cartoon characters as mascots for each program.

Additionally, ALZip integrates into the "New Folder" function of Windows Explorer, where new folders are created with the option of using custom icons and names.

== File format controversy ==
In 2003, there was a controversy over ALZip's own compression file format ALZ when a developer of another Korean compression utility, "빵집," insisted that ALZip users were forced to use the ALZip archiver when decompressing ALZ files. He also stated that ESTsoft does not offer decompression libraries, and that third-party archiver developers have had to use reverse engineering to develop their own algorithms.

=== EGG format and ALZ Algorithm ===
The EGG format is used to apply multiple different compression algorithms, choosing the algorithm based on the file extension. For example, it may use Bzip2 to compress .txt files, while using Deflate for files with a .exe extension. For .com or .sys files, ALZip uses the ALZ algorithm.

The ALZ algorithm is slower but has a high compression ratio. It has a faster compression rate than the Deflate algorithm used in the ZIP format, and is comparable to the LZMA algorithm of 7-Zip.

Reverse engineering revealed similarities between it and LZMA. It has been confirmed that LZ77 is used.

== See also ==
- File archiver
- Data compression
- Comparison of file archivers
- Comparison of archive formats
- List of archive formats
