= Gunbound =

2002 video game

- Developer: Softnyx
- Publishers: EU: GOA; JP: HanGame; KR: Softnyx; TH: Asiasoft; USA: Ijji Games LLC; SEA: Gravity Game Hub; LATAM: Bratty! Studios
- Platform: Windows
- Release: May 2002 (Korea); August 2003 (worldwide)
- Genre: Artillery
- Mode: Multiplayer

Gunbound (stylized as GunBound; Korean: 건바운드 Geonbaundeu) is a free-to-play, multiplayer, turn-based artillery game developed by South Korean developer Softnyx. It has been compared to the Worms series as it shares many common gameplay features.

The original version was released in South Korea in May 2002 before being released worldwide in August 2003. A spin-off mobile game titled GunboundM was released in July 2017. A sequel titled New Gunbound was announced for mobile in September 2019 and for the PC in May 2020. The PC version was scheduled for release on Steam in July 2020. However, it remained unreleased and was removed from Steam in February, 2021.

== Gameplay ==
Gunbound has turn-based artillery gameplay, bearing properties of two-dimensional games and ballistics-simulation games. In Gunbound, players are assigned to two opposing teams, which take turns firing at each other with vehicles called "Mobiles" in Gunbound parlance. Each Mobile has three unique weapons, labeled "1", "2", and "SS" (Special Shot).

Factors like terrain condition, wind currents and elemental phenomena force players to continuously change their aim and trajectory power setting while rethinking their strategy at the same time. Gunbound also implements a "delay" turn system which is influenced by the Mobile, the weapon and/or item a player uses—using items or taking time with actions results in a longer wait before the player's next turn.

Before the start of every game, the room master has the option to disable certain items from being used during that game. All or none of the items could be disabled. Items either take up one or two slots, and each player is allowed to acquire any combination of items as long as they fit in six slots. Generally, strong items take up two slots, while weak items take up one slot. There are currently four different types of items available. They are attack items, defensive items, weather item, and other items.

=== Avatars ===
A user's character can be equipped with clothing and other items, termed avatar Items, which provide additional statistical bonuses that will assist players in the game, except on specific servers where avatar bonuses are disabled. This adds an element of customization for players. Gold (the game's currency) earned from battles can be spent on these Avatar items. Avatars can also be bought using cash which can be bought using money from a credit card or cash using PayPal or mail (Gcoins). Most common avatars can be bought by gold, and very strong avatars by G Coin, but some can be bought with both.

In Gunbound International, avatars can be leveled up by enchanting, and this can only be done with Cash. The maximum level is currently 20. Each level boosts significant stats to the avatar.

=== Mobiles ===
The game has twenty Mobiles in total. Every Mobile falls under one of three different defense categories: Mechanical, Shielded, and Bionic, and one of four different attack categories: Laser, Explosion, Impact, and Electrical.

Different mobiles have different defenses, attack and health levels, delay, angle ranges, bunge (land damage) ability, and moving ability. The 24 Mobiles are Armor Mobile, Mage, Nak, Lightning, JD, A. Sate, Tiburon, J. Frog, Kalsiddon, Trico, Bigfoot, Boomer, Ice, Turtle, Grub, Raon Launcher, Aduka, Maya, Wolf, Phoenix, Blue Whale, Frank, Dragon, and Knight. Choosing Random (which randomly picks a bot) is the only way to obtain the Dragon, Knight, or Phoenix (if you aren't a Power User, Cash is used to pay for this EX Item) mobiles; the other bots can be chosen at any time prior to a battle. In the Gunbound Revolution version, Maya is bought in the Cash store. In June 2010, 4 new mobiles were introduced in Gunbound International. They are Shadower Walker, Princess, Assassin and Carrior. They're named by regular players.

To note that some of the mobiles weren’t present during the initial release of the game. Those were only added on future updates. The list below details in which phase each mobile was added:

Thor’s Hammer

A.Sate, Aduka, Armor Mobile, Big Foot, Boomer Laucher, Dragon, Grub, Ice, JD, Knight, Lighting, Mage, Nak Machine, Raon Launcher, Trico, Turtle;

World Champion

J.Frog, Kalsiddon;

Season 2

Blue Whale, Frank, Maya, Phoenix, Tiburon, Wolf;

Season 3

Assassin, Carrior, Princess, Shadow Walker.

=== Game modes ===
Solo

Each player has only one life during game play. Once dead, the deceased players access a three-in-a-row, rolling slots game in which they can gain gold, alter wind conditions (affecting the shots of still-living players), or drop randomly chosen items or bombs from the sky.

Tag

Tag mode is similar to Solo mode with only one difference: Players are allowed two Mobiles at the beginning of a match. In this mode, players are permitted to switch once per turn between their chosen primary and secondary Mobiles, each with its own health value (Initially, secondary Mobiles only have half of its total health. This, however, can be mended using Healing items). Players cannot switch Mobiles once dead.

Score

In Score mode, the objective is to kill or bunge opponents until the enemy life counter reaches zero. Bunging is destroying the land around an opponent's area, causing the opponent to fall. The lives allotted in Score mode relies on the number of team players participating in a match. For a team composed of n players, there are (n + 1) lives. Lives are pooled between players in a team. A team wins if the opposition's life counter reaches zero, or if there are no more opponents left on the field. Dead players, upon dying, have a choice of their drop location and drop at that point in the field for a set number of four turns after the point is chosen. Should a player not hit land, he or she will continue to fall and the team life counter will not go down, but instead cause the player to reselect the drop location and wait another four turns. The player's drop location is slightly affected by wind conditions.

Jewel

Participants are required to eliminate targets called Jewel (seen in the form of Raons). Each Jewel is assigned a point value for being destroyed. Point values include -5, 5, 10 and 25. Shots fired at the enemy will not cause damage, but can destroy land. Teams win the game by rounding up at least 100 points, or bunging (hitting the land underneath them until they drop down) their opponents until none are left.

Powerball

Same as Score mode, except that only the 'teleport' item is available. Instead, Powerballs representing the various items drop from the sky. Collecting the Powerball grants the corresponding item's ability. Different effects can be stacked. There are five Powerballs: Thunder Ball, Dual Ball, Gold Ball, Force Ball and Bomb Ball. The Thunder Ball will cause thunder to strike where the bullet lands when it is shot as if it went through a thunder storm in other circumstances. The Dual Ball acts as if the player had used a Dual item but does not affect delay. The Gold Ball increases the gold earned from completing certain feats. The Force Ball increases the damage done when hitting another player. The Bomb Ball is the only non-beneficial Power Ball and deals 100 damage to whoever it hits. The damage can stack when multiple Bomb Balls hit a player. Each player is allowed to have up to 4 bombs stacked at a time.

== Development ==
Gunbound was developed and is maintained by South Korean developer Softnyx. Its first major release was in 2002 as an open beta software and was subtitled Thor's Hammer. In 2006, a World Championships was held and the game's subtitle changed to World Champion. In subsequent major releases, the game was subtitled by seasons and it is in Season 3.

Between 2003 and 2007, Gunbound was localized and launched in various parts of the world, such as in Thailand, Brazil, Japan and Europe. It was also released in North America as Gunbound Revolution by online game portal ijji. However, the North American servers were shut down on July 24, 2009.

=== GunboundM ===
In July 2017, a free-to-play mobile version of Gunbound titled GunboundM was released on Google Play and the App Store (iOS). It was developed by DargomStudio in partnership with Softnyx, and features gameplay similar the original Gunbound but with modified features such as a visible bullet path for players to aim their shots, a training mode against AI-controlled opponents, and in-built microtransactions. On December 13, 2021, GunboundM was released on Steam as a free-to-play game also with microtransactions.

=== New Gunbound ===
In September 2019, New Gunbound was announced as a new mobile game developed in partnership with Thailand publisher Electronics Extreme, which would be released in 10 countries within Southeast Asia. A closed beta took place in 2020 between January 15 and January 22.

In May 2020, a desktop version of New Gunbound was announced and released in Latin America. A version developed by Rocket Punch Games was announced to be released on Steam in July 2020. However, it was never released and was removed from Steam in February, 2021.

== Reception ==
Reception

Review scores
Publication	Score
GameSpot	8/10
PC Gamer (UK)	4/5

The UK edition of PC Gamer magazine gave Gunbound a rating of 83 out of 100.
