= Battleswarm: Field of Honor =

2009 video game

Battleswarm
- Developer: Game World Tech
- Publisher: Reality Gap
- Platform: Microsoft Windows
- Release: August 10, 2009 (Beta) November 19, 2009 (Launch)
- Genre: FPS/RTS
- Mode: Multiplayer

Battleswarm: Field of Honor was a free-to-play first-person shooter/real-time strategy video game developed by Game World Tech. Battleswarm featured an item mall which used Reality Gap's e-currency called 'MetaTIX'. Battleswarm was officially launched on November 19, 2009.

On July 1, 2011, Reality Gap announced they were to shut down game servers, while 'in the process of a sale to a new company who specializes in children's games'. On July 16, 2011, the game servers were officially shut down.

== Plot Overview ==
Battleswarm takes place on a foreign planet during a catastrophic war between humans and a race of giant bugs.

== Development ==
Battleswarm was released for closed beta in August 2009.

== Gameplay ==
Battleswarm had a unique gameplay concept that pitted two genres of gameplay against each other. The human team was playable as a first- or third-person shooter, while the bug team was commanded in the style of a real-time strategy game.

The game had both PvP and PvE gameplay, and had a large selection of game types and maps.
