= Kim Jae-young (baseball) =

Korean baseball player

- Pitcher
- Born: July 22, 1993 (age 31); Seoul, South Korea
- Batted: Right Threw: Right

KBO debut
- April 2, 2016, for the Hanwha Eagles

Last KBO appearance
- September 17, 2023, for the Hanwha Eagles

KBO statistics
- Win–loss record: 11–13
- Earned run average: 5.84
- Strikeouts: 136

Teams
- Hanwha Eagles (2016–2019, 2022–2023)

Kim Jae-young (Korean: 김재영; born July 22, 1993, in Seoul) is a South Korean former pitcher for the Hanwha Eagles of the KBO League.
