= Argo Online =

ARGO Online
- Argo Online logo
- Developer(s): Green Forrest
- Publisher(s): mGame Corporation (Asia); Games-Masters.com (Europe)
- Release: Asia 2010 International 2011 Europe 2014
- Genre(s): Hybrid MMORPG

Argo Online (stylized as ARGO Online) is a hybrid free-to-play massively multiplayer online role-playing game first launched in 2020 and developed by Green Forrest. The game borrows stylistic elements from high fantasy and steampunk themes.

mGame Corporation launched Argo Online on 4 August 2010 in Korea. On 21 April 2011, Burda:ic launched the game for the western market for North America and Europe. On 1 March 2013, burda:ic announced the end of the European and North American service for Argo Online. In Korea, the game continued to grow a large userbase and in 2011, Asiasoft announced the release of ARGO Online for the SEA market in 2012. On 1 July 2013, Games-Masters.com Ltd. announced that they will offer ARGO Online in Europe in 2014.
