= Sting: The Secret Operations =

2008 video game

- Developers: YNK Games, YNK Korea
- Engine: Source Engine
- Platform: Microsoft Windows
- Release: 2008: Korea: 2008; Taiwan: 2008; Japan: June 2009; United States: September 2009 (1st Closed Beta); Philippines: January 2009 (1st Closed Beta), February 2010 Open Beta
- Genre: First-person shooter
- Modes: Multiplayer, Online Game

Sting: The Secret Operations, also known as Sting: Secret Operations or Sting Online and abbreviated to Sting (Korean:스팅, Japanese release name: Code Name Sting, USA and Philippine release name: K.O.S: Secret Operations) is an online first-person shooter that is being developed by YNK Games and YNK Korea, and distributed by YNK Interactive. It is the first first-person shooter game using the Source Engine in Korea.
