= The Legend of Ares =

Legend of Ares
- Developer(s): MGame
- Publisher(s): KR: MGame; WW: Reforgix
- Platform(s): Microsoft Windows
- Release: KR: 2004; WW: August 3, 2024
- Genre(s): MMORPG
- Mode(s): MMO

The Legend of Ares, also known as Ares Online, is a free 3D, MMORPG game developed by MGame. Like many 3D MMORPGs, it is a point and click game, where players can attack monsters (PvE) or other players (PvP), pick up items, and talk to NPCs for items and quests.

The game was first released in South Korea in 2004. Previous international versions of the game were released in 2006 and 2017, but both shut down within a few years. The current international version, published by Reforgix, exited beta and launched on August 3, 2024.

== Story ==
Ares, Greek god of war, has become resentful of his fellow gods, and wishes to gain more power in order to defeat them. However, the Greek city-states are already warring, and Ares must find new lands in which war can be started. At the same time, the land of Arabic is at a restless peace, with the leaders of both The Holy Empire, and The Religious Alliance ready to break it. Ares travels to Arabic, appearing to Emperor Damion of The Holy Empire as a crow, and incites him to attack the Alliance. Athena, Ares' sister, gains knowledge of this plan, and also travels to Arabic, and informs the native god Kulam of the foreign gods intrusion. Under her guidance, Kulam has intercourse with Aleria, the daughter of Alliance leader Abner.

== Gameplay ==
The game contains two nations which a player can choose to join: the Holy Empire and Religious Alliance. Players can also choose from four separate classes: (Knight, Spearman, Archer and Sorcerer), each with their own skills that are unique to their class. As with most RPGs, the more they play, the stronger they become; players must kill monsters for experience points (EXP) to level up. As a player advances in levels, trouble is bound to occur, not only with stronger monsters, but with players of either country.

=== Warfare ===
Every so often, twice a week to be exact, warfare is declared. During warfare, players unite with their countrymen to battle it out against the other nation. Two types of warfare exist. In standard warfare, their team earns points when an enemy dies, an enemy symbol is destroyed, or an enemy catapult is destroyed. In territorial warfare, both nations go against each other in an attempt to destroy the other nations chieftain to control certain areas for added bonuses like cheaper prices for supplies and higher sell rates to npc's. The Warfare Map is relatively simple: One base per nation, separated by a large canyon/gorge. Whenever symbols are destroyed the name of the person who made the last hit on the symbol is announced. The two different warfare have level limits, the first warfare is for 70–119 and the second warfare is for levels 121 and above.

=== Guilds ===
Players can form guilds or clans which allow for more social interaction, other people to quest with and the addition of a cape and guild tag. They can also engage in guild wars, involving two guilds fighting each other. When a guild war is declared, the names of the guilds involved are announced.

== Release history ==
The game was first released in South Korea in 2004, then released for the international market in 2006.

As of May 2009, the international version of the Legend of Ares was shut down, along with two other games from Netgame. However the Korean version of Legend of Ares is still running.

The international version was brought back by Red Fox Games and published on Steam on May 31, 2017. Red Fox Games shut down their version on September 31, 2018.

In December 2023, Reforgix acquired publishing rights for the game from MGame. After alpha and beta development stages, Reforgix officially re-released the game on August 3, 2024.
