= Scions of Fate =

2004 video game

Yulgang Online
- Developer: KRG Soft
- Publishers: CDC Games, (Indonesia) Gemscool
- Platform: Windows
- Genre: MMORPG
- Mode: Massively multiplayer online

Yulgang (also known in the US as Scions of Fate) is a MMORPG developed by KRG Soft in South Korea and released on November 25, 2004 in its native region. Scions of Fate is serviced by Mgame in South Korea. It is based on a Korean martial arts comic which shares its name.. The title of the game, Yulgang is an abbreviated form of the full title Yul-Hyul-Gang-Ho (热血江湖 or 열혈강호) which is a famous manga series of South Korea. The word Yul-Hyul-Gang-Ho literally means "hot-blooded-river-lake", where "river-lake" in Chinese characters commonly refers to the ancient far-east pugilistic world. The subtitle "Balance of Power" refers to the two factions that are presented in the game: "The Order" and "Chaos." In China, the game is licensed to Beijing 17game Network, a subsidiary of CDC Games. This MMORPG charges no fee to play the game, but creates revenue through sale of virtual merchandise. As of February 14, 2007, the game is popular in China and Korea, with over 100 million registered players with servers active in Japan, China, Taiwan, Thailand, Indonesia and America. As of November 2006, the game supported over 600,000 concurrent users playing online at the same time.

== Gameplay ==
=== Factions ===
There are two factions in Yulgang (Scions of Fate) The Order, and Chaos. Both factions have their own stories and backgrounds along with unique character looks to tell the factions apart. They also have different styles of clothing as well as weapons. Anyone can choose which faction they wish to enter at level 35 after doing the '2nd Promotion Quest' by talking to the corresponding Faction Agent.
