= Seal Online =

2003 video game

- Developers: Grigon Entertainment, PLAYWITH Games
- Publisher: PLAYWITH Interactive
- Designer: Kim ByungChul
- Series: Seal
- Platform: Microsoft Windows
- Release: KOR: 2003-07-16; NA: 19 November 2007
- Genre: MMORPG
- Mode: Multiplayer

Seal Online (씰 온라인) is a massively multiplayer online role-playing game (MMORPG) originally developed by the Korean company Grigon Entertainment. In February 2007, publisher YNK Interactive acquired the rights for the game, and in January 2009, the game was moved to the internal studio YNK Games. As of February 2008, official versions of the game are available in South Korea, Japan, Taiwan, Thailand, Indonesia, Brazil, and the United States.

The English version of Seal Online was expected to be released in Quarter 3 of 2005, when Grigon Entertainment announced that there would be an English version of Seal Online. However, within two months, the site closed.

In 2007, a website was created for Seal Online, containing a blog post announcing the arrival of Seal Online in English to the United States. The English Seal Online was finally released on 19 November 2007 by YNK Interactive.

== Gameplay ==
Seal Online is a point-and-click MMORPG; movement, combat, and many other commands are all controlled by mouse, while the combo system is done with a keyboard. The player can choose from seven different classes to start with. However, if the player chooses to start with the Beginner, they can choose to job change into the other six classes when they reach Level 10. 21 new classes were added in early 2009. The game experienced a server wipe on 27 September 2010, bringing all players back to level 1.

Seal Online's travel system uses a method called Warp Gates. These gates, located in various towns, allow the player to move to other maps. Players may use scrolls, set revive points, use the Wagon Driver NPC, or type a teleport command for a small fee to warp to different maps.

Players can learn skills to trade, open or join a guild after completing a quest, open a chat room, create a party to fight monsters more effectively, open an in-game bank account to hold or collect more items and money, nurture a pet, do quests, and fish.

Seal Online's level up system uses a point method; skills level up with skill points. Each time a player levels up, they receive a set number of skill points and status points, which they may use to strengthen their character. As a player attacks an enemy, the XP bar fills up. Once the bar is halfway filled, the player can start a combo by pressing the game's combo buttons. After starting a combo, players must press a combination of buttons. Combos do more damage than normal attacks, and are executed faster.

== Sequel ==
Early in 2026, Play With Korea announced it would expand Seal Online intellectual property into an international franchise by releasing new video games for mobile and other platforms. In August 2026, Seal M2 was announced as an official sequel to Seal Online. It was released on 22 October 2026.
