= YNK Interactive =

Game developer and publisher in South Korea

- Industry: Video games
- Genre: Online game publishing
- Founded: 2005
- Founder: Jun W Lee
- Headquarters: United States
- Area served: Global
- Owner: Jun W Lee
- Subsidiaries: part of YNK Korea
- Website: https://www.ynkinteractive.com

YNK Interactive is a game publisher company founded in 2005 based in Orange County, California. The company is a wholly owned subsidiary of YNK Korea, a Korea online game developer and publisher. YNK Interactive publishes English versions of game titles from YNK Korea that released titles such as Seal Online, Rohan Online, and K.O.S: The Secret Operations.

== Current titles ==
- Seal Online - The first title YNK Interactive published, it was released on November 19, 2007.
- R.O.H.A.N.:Blood Feud - A popular MMORPG among fans.
- K.O.S: The Secret Operations - The first online first-person shooter Game of YNK Interactive and YNK Korea.
