= Cabal Online =

2005 video game

CABAL Online
- Developer: ESTsoft Corp.
- Publisher: ESTsoft Inc.
- Platform: Microsoft Windows
- Release: KOR: October 2005; EU: September 2006; NA: February 2008
- Genre: Massively multiplayer online role-playing game
- Mode: Multiplayer

Cabal Online (Korean: 카발 온라인, stylized as CABAL Online) is a free-to-play, 3D massively multiplayer online role-playing game developed by South Korean company ESTsoft. Different localizations of the game exist for various countries and regions. Although free-to-play, the game makes use of the freemium business model by implementing an "Item Shop", both in-game and via web, allowing players to purchase special premium coins using real currency, in order to acquire exclusive game enhancements and features, useful items and assorted vanity content.

Cabal Online takes place in a fictional world known as Nevareth, nearly a thousand years after its devastation by a powerful group of idealistic men, the CABAL. Hoping to turn their world into a utopia, they inadvertently fueled the forces and laws of nature to rebel against them, causing the event known as the Apocalypse. After the destruction, only eight members of the CABAL survived, including their leader, Faust, who has a prophetic vision of a new evil force that threatens the land of Nevareth.

Cabal is currently licensed and operated by Combo InterActive under ESTgames’ rights, and has been redeveloped into two main platforms: Cabal Ultimate Combo (PC version) and Cabal Infinite Combo (mobile version), in order to comprehensively serve both PC players and smartphone users in the modern era.

== Gameplay ==
As a typical MMORPG, gameplay in Cabal Online contains elements of both player versus player and player versus environment, as well as player killing. PvE elements include grinding and quests which reward players with items and experience points, as well as instances for obtaining assorted treasure and "Alz", the in-game currency. PvP elements include player-killing in special channels (with penalties for mass killing), arranged duels between two players with no penalties for either side, the Mission War system, which divides players into two nations, Capella and Procyon, as well as a Neutral faction, and has them wage war against each other in Tierra Gloriosa events, specific war channels and all higher-level maps (which are war-enabled at all times), and lastly the Guild versus Guild system, allowing arranged mini-wars between two guilds. Players can band together to form a party, with a maximum of six characters. Bonus experience points are awarded to party members based on their contributions.

The game is divided into servers, or game worlds, each with its own unique name and set of further subdivisions - channels. While players from different servers cannot interact with each other unless they transfer to the same server using special premium items, they can switch freely through all available channels on one server, including Premium ones if they have purchased a Premium package. Characters in different channels cannot, however, assist each other directly; only characters in the same channel can interact. Chatting does bypass this restriction for chat modes such as private messaging (whispering), guild chat, party chat or personal chat rooms. All servers in each localization have equal content, apart from their player base and economy, but different regional versions of Cabal Online may have different content, in particular the Korean localization, which is always more up-to-date than the remainder. Each account allows for six characters per server, but only one account is needed to access all servers.

Channels employ different mechanics depending on their purpose. Those labelled in green are novice-friendly and have player-killing disabled (although war mechanics still apply, even in standard higher-level maps), in contrast with white-coloured channels, which do not forbid it. The Trade channel is designed specifically for in-game item purchases and sales, applying restrictions to normal gameplay, such as removing access to instance dungeons and practice dummies, as well as removing all environmental enemies. Trading in this channel can be performed via channel-wide broadcasting or personal market stalls in which items can be placed and priced for general access. Any channels tagged as Premium can only be accessed by users who purchased a Premium package or equivalent from the Item Shop.

=== World ===
A player going through the warp gate located in Bloody Ice

The world of Cabal Online is split into different zones, namely maps and dungeons. Starting players will only be able to access three maps and one zone, the "Warp Gate", which provides walking access to all the three initial maps. As they progress into the game and gain character levels, they will be given access to new and increasingly difficult maps, as well as instance dungeons. Each map has a different setting and weather; examples of these include deserts, forests, snow and ice maps and even a futuristic cityscape or hellish inferno. Each map has its own unique set of non-playing characters, such as quest characters and shops, as well as many monsters to fight and gain experience and treasure from. Travelling from one map to another is done by either walking through the Warp Gate links or by using Premium GPS Warp to instantly switch to a specific map. In assisting travel by foot, players may acquire special vessels, namely Astral Boards and Bikes, which provide greater speed, or use the special movement-enhancing skills "Dash" and "Blink", the latter exclusive to the Wizard class.

=== Character Classes and Specialities ===
A low-leveled Force Blader using magic to fight monsters in Cabal Online. The character and inventory dialog screens are open.

There are eight character classes in Cabal Online. Once a character is created, the player must choose which character class it will assume. The 8 classes are the Warrior, the Blader, the Wizard, the Force Blader, the Force Shielder, the Force Archer, the Gladiator, and the Force Gunner. Different character classes provide different strategies, skill libraries, arsenal and even starting locations.

By levelling up, players will gain points that they can apply in three different attributes that will shape their character, those being Strength, or STR, Intelligence, or INT and Dexterity, or DEX. These attributes affect several secondary attributes which will effectively determine the strengths and weaknesses of the character. These secondary attributes are Attack, the physical strength of Sword skills, Magic, the magical strength of Magic skills, Defense, the resistance to enemy attacks, Hit or Attack Rate, the accuracy of all the player's attacks and Defense Rate, the rate at which enemy attacks are fully evaded or dodged.

==== Warrior ====
The Warrior class is the typical melee sword-user. They use Force to brutally enhance their physical abilities. They possess the highest innate vitality or health value and their offensive skills are slow and powerful. Their equipment set is by default the highly-defensive Armour Set, metallic armours made of various materials and two-handed swords, either Great Swords or Daikatana. They possess many strengthening buff skills that can even further enhance their capabilities, including party-targeted buffs. Their primary attribute is Strength which enhances their physical attack value and their resistance.

==== Blader ====
The Blader class is a fast sword-user melee class known for its enhanced dodging and accuracy, as well as the speed of its skills. They use Force to enhance both their dexterity and strength, giving them more flexibility than a Warrior. Unlike warriors, however, they possess only two party-enhancing strengthening skills; as such relying more often on their individual strengths even when in a party, namely their damage output and critical hit rate. Their equipment includes by default the Martial Set, a lightweight kimono-styled cloth which favours Defense Rate, or evasion, as well as a Blade and a Katana, or two swords of only one type if the player is so inclined.

==== Wizard ====
The third class is the Wizard and it is the basic magic-user. They use Force to amplify the power of the elements around them akin to what a Warrior does to its own strength. Their primary attribute is Intelligence which raises their magical attack power. They possess several buff skills that can affect not only themselves but any other friendly targets they choose, as well as many party buffs. Some of these skills are well known, namely the most basic ones which increase Health or Defense and are usually performed on newcomers to aid them in their initial progress. Their skills have a powerful damage output, but they have one particular difference from melee classes, which is their area of effect, or AoE. While melee classes deal high damage to lesser enemies with the same skill, Wizards disperse their damage through the highest area possible for all classes. Combined with the paralysing capability of all of their strongest skills, Wizards are crucial for controlling masses of enemies. Their main disadvantage is their lower Defense, but this can be tactically overcome by making use of the stun effect of their advanced magic. Their equipment set is by default the Martial Set and dual Orbs, single-handed globe-shaped controllers which spawn staves in recent versions of the game.

==== Force Archer ====
Force Archers are a variation of Wizards who prefer to manipulate rather than amplify Force. Because of this, their skills have a lesser area of effect in comparison to the Wizard's skills but, in contrast, their damage is more precise, more accurate and with a higher critical hit rate. They visualize and create a weapon in a way similar to the Force Shielder, which is the Astral Bow; this weapon enhances their accuracy and critical rate. They also possess the highest attack range of all classes, even higher than that of a Wizard. Unique to this class, they possess supportive magic such as powerful single-target and party Healing skills, as well as many useful buffs, especially some used on new players alongside the Wizard's. Their skills have the fastest casting time of all, giving them a high damage per second value. Force Archers value Intelligence and Dexterity, both for magical power and dodging, as well as the balanced Battle Set and dual Crystals.

==== Force Shielder ====
Force Shielders are one of the two classes who have learned to materialize Force into a real weapon. By studying magic, they have gained the ability to visualize and create an Astral Shield, a relic which provides them with greater Defense. This class is the basic tank class which possesses the highest Defense of all classes and, when combined with its powerful damage-absorbing party skill, can effectively guard other party members from a high amount of damage. Force Shielders also possess a basic Healing skill, unlike all other classes say for the Force Archer. Their latter skills are also the most critical damaging techniques of all classes, making them both a good defender and attacker. Like the Force Blader, they are a hybrid Sword-Magic class, but unlike the Force Blader who ultimately will have to develop both spheres to be able to use curses, the Force Shielder can truly specialize in only one area of expertise. A Sword Force Shielder will focus on the physical Sword skills and value brawling and critical damaging. In this case, they would value Strength and Dexterity for physical power and resistance. A Magic Force Shielder will focus on Magic skills, namely cannon-type targeted spells which value damage per second instead of high instant damage. They will rely on Dexterity and Intelligence for strength, resistance and dodge. The class can also be hybridized to fully utilise its complete potential, commonly making use of paralysing Magic skills when fighting against the environment. Their arsenal is by default the Armour Set, a Blade and a Crystal, counterpart to the Orb, though it can depend on the type of specialization taken if the player so chooses.

==== Force Blader ====
The Force Blader class is themed as a magic swordsman. They use Force to empower their blade arts and have developed unique debuff skills that no other class possesses. Although they can use targeted cannon-type magic skills to fight, their sword skills are the strongest, their magic affinity being demonstrated only in their Force-imbued Sword skills. Their most powerful attacks are also enchanted with curses, causing negative handicapping effects on their targets alongside damage itself. Because they evenly nurture all three of the main attributes, they are both the most flexible and most time-consuming class to develop. Their equipment is by default the balanced Battle Set, a protective suit made of many different kinds of fibers, a Katana and an Orb. Their complexity in the use of curse skills makes them a class best for advanced players.

==== Gladiator ====
The Gladiator is a powerful melee class that relies on the Rage resource to deal close and long range damage. Rage is accumulated through the continued use of skills, sending the Gladiator into a frenzy. The Gladiator excels at dealing Area of Effect damage and utilizes the unique Chakram weapon, wears heavy armor, and benefits greatly from the Strength Stat.

==== Force Gunner ====
A special force driven battle style created in secrecy, the Force Gunner specializes in long ranged sniping skills and powerful Area of Effect damage. Focusing on higher attack speeds and critical attacks, Force Gunners weave physical and magical attacks to destroy their enemies from afar. Force Gunners wear medium armor and benefit from Intelligence and Dexterity Stats.

==== Dark Mage ====
The Dark Mage is the last class introduced by the game. It is described on the official site as a clan of wizards who dealt with the force and longed for power that was beyond mundane magic. After decades of research, they were able to fuse the souls of the dead with the Force, creating magic that can summon both the darkness and the lightness of beings. This class utilizes Orbs and their main Stat is Intelligence.

=== Skills ===
A blader using Combo Mode to fight NPCs. The combo meter can be seen.

All classes are provided with a skill library that spans in both Sword and Magic-based spheres. Classes who are focused on one sphere, like Warriors or Bladers, will have all its offensive and support skills in it, while the other will be used only for common targeted magic spells and novice buffs, as well as an advanced one. Hybrid classes may use both spheres for different purposes; while Force Bladers develop only curses in advanced stages of the Magic sphere, Force Shielders possess some offensive unique arts in that sphere as well. Beyond offensive and support skills, there are also teleportation skills that all classes possess. Dashing is one that every character can use if they develop the necessary Sword sphere stage, which causes them to quickly dash a short distance and can be used in intervals to increase walking speed. Wizards have a unique teleportation skill called Blink which behaves similarly to Dash but is developed in the Magic sphere. Wizards are also the only class that can use both Dash and Blink and thus walk faster than any other class, effectively moving faster than even the rare vehicle items that exist in the game.

Special skills are unlocked at certain points during the character's growth by completing specific "ranking" quests. These skills include the Combo Mode, which allows several skills to be used in succession when the combo meter is pressed with correct timing, as well as several Battle Modes that provide temporary attribute bonuses to the character or even a special combat mode. Aura Mode is a basic empowering Battle Mode that can be later stacked with either advanced Battle Modes to further increase attributes. It is elemental in nature, although the element bears no difference in bonuses applied, altering only the visual effects of the skill. Battle Mode 1 is an advanced Aura Mode that is unique for all classes and which, in some cases, even adds new mechanics for the duration of the mode. Both Battle Modes 2 and 3 provide an entirely separate special combat mode unique to each class, along with attribute increases. While Battle Mode 2 grants classes a special temporary weapon with additional functionality, Battle Mode 3 provides a full set of new exclusive skills to be used for its duration, essentially providing characters with a third skill library beyond Sword and Magic skills.

Beyond Battle Modes, special utility skills also exist. Classes with Astral weapons are given a summoning skill to enable them; all classes are additionally capable of acquiring Astral vehicle summoning and Combo Mode skills, enabling a special combat style exclusive to the usage of Astral Boards or Bikes. In addition, characters are given a large set of command and emote skills, allowing them to loot items, automatically follow players or perform several emotive character animations. Lastly, all classes can learn several upgrade skills that enhance their attributes further, in a permanent fashion.

Skills can only be learned when a certain skill rank or stage is achieved. Like levelling up, increasing skill ranks requires gaining skill experience, which in turn is gained by using skills repeatedly, namely offensive skills. In previous versions of the game, skill experience gain was restricted to skills of the appropriate sphere (Sword skills for Sword Rank, Magic skills for Magic Rank). This was later changed to a common experience gain in which any skill increases both spheres. Likewise, the requirement of a specific "class rank" for attaining newer skill ranks was added. Class ranks are gained by completing ranking quests every ten character levels.

=== Nation/Mission War ===
Once a player has reached level 52 and completed the quest for choosing a Nation, during which they will select either the Capella or Procyon factions, a new event is enabled for the player. This is the Nation War, which occurs multiple times each day and allows opposing nations to fight each other and gain war experience points, which can in turn be converted into experience, skill experience or honour points, as well as into special rewards at each faction's Nation War lobby. Depending on the level range of the characters, different Nation War channels will be accessible. During the War, players struggle to overtake key locations controlled by powerful guardian monsters, the Legacy Guardians, fend off the enemy players and ultimately take control of the enemy's main base, effectively winning that instance of the War.

Each Nation War lasts one hour and the entrance lobby is open for some time before the event begins so as to allow players to plan strategies, stock up on consumables and heal for the battle. While many players can enter the lobby, only a certain number will be able to take part in the War, an equal amount for both factions. Entry costs for the Nation War differ depending on the War instance's level range and may be refunded depending on the player's total score, as well as whether the faction is victorious or not. Players are also awarded special consumable items for their performance that they can sell on NPC shops, in which the rarest and most valuable of these will be worth a large sum of Alz. Characters may remain Neutral if they so wish, not completing the Nation quest for as long as they prefer. This will, however, restrict access to Nation War features until the player chooses a Nation for their character.

== Development ==
Cabal Online was developed by ESTsoft. The programming works were led by Min Yeonghwan.

== Release ==
Cabal Online was first released in South Korea in October 2005. The game was later released from closed beta testing in Europe in July 2006, and by December the game and all subsequent versions became free-to-play. In North America, OGPlanet had picked up the license for the game, and was officially launched in North America in February 2008, while closed beta began in South-East Asia. Gameforge published Cabal Online in Germany on December 3, 2009. The service in North America provided by OGPlanet ceased on March 31, 2010, as the company did not reach an agreement with ESTsoft, while the latter subsequently re-established North American servicing directly.

== Critical reception ==
Cabal Online received mixed reviews from critics. In December 2006, PC Gamer UK gave it a rating of 6.4, commenting that the game was "mindblowingly generic". The magazine had also criticized Cabal Online for sharing many features as other Korean MMORPGs. Despite the negative review from PC Gamer UK, the game was selected as one of the "Top 9 Free MMOs Worth Playing" in the magazine's June issue.

== Sequels ==
A mobile MMORPG titled Cabal Mobile was released on 4 June 2019.

Cabal Online 2 was promoted in South Korea in October 2010 before the start of G-Star 2010, in Busan. The game promoted a change from its original "techno-punk" theme into a royal theme, hyper-action game with six character classes. This change included the removal of the Blader class from the original game, replacing it with a new Priest class. The sequel to Cabal Online used CryEngine 3 as the main graphics engine. The sequel was shut down on April 8, 2018.
