= Rohan: Blood Feud =

2008 video game

Rohan Blood Feud
- Developer: YNK Korea
- Publisher: YNK Interactive
- Designer: Martin
- Engine: Epoch
- Platform: Microsoft Windows
- Release: NA: May 28, 2008; (Open Beta)
- Genre: Fantasy MMORPG
- Mode: Multiplayer

Rohan: Blood Feud (an English-speaking version of the recently released Rohan Online) is a free-to-play massively multiplayer online role-playing game (MMORPG). One week of closed beta testing in America started from March 17, 2008 by publisher YNK Interactive. It ended its one week of closed beta testing. Second round of closed beta testing ran from April 3, 2008 to April 9, 2008, the open beta was launched May 28, 2008. There are other versions of Rohan Online in Korea, Taiwan, Japan, Indonesia, and Philippines as well.

== Plot ==
In the beginning God created the world in seven days. Edoneh was born from the solitude of fortitude. As stated earlier god created the earth in seven days, but the great god gave it to Ian as a gift, Ian in turn gave birth to the five minor gods: Roha, Gale, Marea, Flox, and Silva.

Ian set his creations, known by scholars as "The Lesser/Lower Gods" down on the earth and each of these gods in turn created a race for this new world. Roha created the Humans, Gale created the Giants, Marea the Elves, Flox created Dökkálfar and Dark Elves, and Silva the Halflings. The Lesser Gods placed their creations on separate regions of Rohan, but Ohn felt this task was too important to be left in the hands of the Lesser Gods, so Ohn created Dragons to divide and patrol the regions.

Peace insured in this early time, but like in all things, everything good must come to an end. In the Human Kingdom, Claut Del Lagos (believed by many scholars to be the world's first Dhan) assassinates his older brother, Penkel Del Lagos (king at that time), and usurps power. Thirteen long years later, the late king's son, Selio Del Lagos, forms a rebellion and ends Claut's regimen. Claut and his followers flee to an island in the northern reaches of Rohan and settle there, and called themselves as Dhans.

The Elf Queen calls for a gathering of the races, but only the Humans and Halflings show up. The Giants and Dark Elves have formed a secret alliance in order to cleanse Rohan of the Humans and Elves. When the Humans, Halflings, and Elves counter this by allying themselves, the Giants extend their hands to the Half Elves. The Dhan and Dekan, having already lost many in their ten-year war remain neutral as this new war unfolds, but their land is now being threatened by monsters from all sides.

The story progresses and determined by the outcome of in-game events dubbed as Story Arc event. Successful events rewards players with experience or drop modifiers, depending on the GM.

== Gameplay ==
Rohan: Blood Feud is a massively multiplayer online role-playing game that allows players to play with another character within the game world, explore lands, kill monsters, engage in quests, perform magic, adopt a pet, buy a mount, and interact with NPCs and other players. The game includes a player-versus-players system, including a "Vengeance" system. Players can also participate in in-game groups called "Guilds", which have the opportunity to control areas within the game, dictating rules such as taxes, or battle other guilds.

=== Crafting ===
In crafting, a player receives certain materials after extracting them from vegetation, minerals, or gemstones. There are four parts to crafting: Gathering, producing, upgrading and extracting.

=== Fishing ===
Players may spend some time in the Fishing Hole, and select a spot to go fishing. There are a variety of fishes that are labeled as: very common (Minnow), common (Eel, Catfish, Carp, and Goldfish), rare (Salmon, and Mullet), unique (Sweet fish), and ancient (Rainbow Trout). Each fish gives a reward, depending on its type.

=== Forging ===
Players can make rare, unique or ancient weapons through the process of forging. A rare weapon can be forged by combining two general weapons, and a unique weapon can be forged by combining two rare weapons. When combining weapons, a roulette determines whether the combination is successful or a failure.

=== Hunting ===
Monsters are positioned in all regions of the Rohan Continent. Gamers must engage in combat utilizing exclusive skills and assorted tactics when encountering a monster. Both the keyboard and mouse can be used when battling in R.O.H.A.N.: Blood Feud.

Players may also undertake the Tutorial mode of R.O.H.A.N.: Blood Feud. Completing the tutorial rewards the player with items and information.

=== Partying ===
Party play in R.O.H.A.N.: Blood Feud allows up to six members in a party. Parties are no longer recommended to execute demanding quests and instead hunt high-level monsters over and over in order to level.

=== Pets ===
Pets in the game aid players in battle by boosting abilities. Pets can level up after being fed a certain amount; this will boost the specific pet's abilities. A pet can die in Rohan due to negligence and can be revived by a revival ticket.

=== Mounts ===
Each race has a unique mount which can only be used by that race. Mounts are purchasable in the Home-town of each race. Mounts are used to help players travel the vast world of Rohan much more quickly. To use a mount, simply double-click its icon in your inventory. A mount is protected from the item drop penalty - meaning you will never drop a mount upon death.
