= Softnyx =

South Korean video game company

Softnyx Ltd.
- Company type: Private
- Industry: Video games
- Founded: April 4, 2001; 25 years ago
- Headquarters: Gangnam-gu, Seoul, South Korea
- Key people: Abbas Can Kök, Can Çetintaş, Sunghun Kim, Bokgyu Lee, Hoguw Kim
- Products: GunBound, Rakion, WolfTeam
- Website: softnyx.net

Softnyx Ltd is a South Korean video game developer and distributor that was founded in 2001 by Jinho Kim in Seoul. The company first released the hit game GunBound in 2003, introducing Indonesian servers in April, Chinese servers in June and an International server in August. GunBound accumulated approximately 5 million registered players in the first year of release and soon turned on more servers intending to be used by players in a specific country in order to reduce the language barrier and improve latency between players. In 2004 Softnyx released a closed beta of the game Rakion which was later publicly released in March 2005 to Korean players and October to International Players. WolfTeam was launched 2 years later in October 2007.

== See also ==
- GunBound
