= HanbitSoft =

Video game company

- Company type: Public
- Founded: 1999
- Founder: Ki Young Kim
- Headquarters: South Korea
- Owner: Ki Young Kim
- Website: www.hanbitsoft.com

HanbitSoft (Korean: 한빛소프트) is a Korean computer game publishing and development company. It is best known internationally as the Korean distributor for the successful computer game StarCraft.

Formed in 1999, HanbitSoft specializes in the distribution of massively multiplayer online roleplaying games (MMORPGs) to Eastern Asian countries. The publishing company is domestically successful, claiming the top five percent of the nation's computer game market share, and has emerged internationally with its flagship game, Tantra Online. Although the company has developed small hits in-house, HanbitSoft invests significantly in the at large gaming industry and has formed partnerships with companies both domestic and abroad.

In May 2003, the company published With Your Destiny, an MMORPG developed by JoyImpact. After HanbitSoft acquired JoyImpact, its development team gradually reduced, leaving the game without updates. Although HanbitSoft left WYD without upgrades for a long time, JoyImpact, in 2019, decided to get the game back from HanbitSoft and return the game development.

HanbitSoft entered into an agreement with Japanese-based Namco to publish a first person action RPG called Hellgate: London, developed by Flagship Studios.

HanbitSoft was acquired by T3 Entertainment on July 3, 2008.
