= List of massively multiplayer online role-playing games =

This is a selected list of massively multiplayer online role-playing games (MMORPGs).

MMORPGs are large multi-user games that take place in perpetual online worlds with a great number of other players. In most MMORPGs each player controls an avatar that interacts with other players, completes tasks to gain experience, and acquires items. MMORPGs use a wide range of business models, from free of charge, free with microtransactions, advertise funded, to various kinds of payment plans. Most early MMORPGs were text-based and web browser-based, later 2D, isometric, side-scrolling and 3D games emerged, including on video game consoles and mobile phones.

Title	Status	Graphics	Setting	Business model	Launched	Closed	Distribution	Notes
The 4th Coming	Active	2D (isometric)	Fantasy	Free-to-play	1999		Steam	Now known as T4C v2
AdventureQuest 3D	Active	3D	Medieval fantasy	Free-to-play	2016		Android, iOS	Steam
AdventureQuest Worlds	Active	2D	Medieval fantasy	Freemium	2008			Browser-based
Age of Conan	Active	3D	Fantasy	Free-to-play	2008			This game features a combo based combat system.
Age of Wulin	Active	3D	Martial Arts, Wuxia (fantasy)	Freemium	2013			Set in ancient China
AIKA Online	Active	3D	Medieval fantasy	Free-to-play	2009			
Aion	Active	3D	Fantasy	Free-to-play	2008			
Albion Online	Active	3D Isometric	Medieval fantasy	Free-to-play with optional subscription model	2017		Steam	
Allods Online	Active	3D	Fantasy	Freemium	2010		Steam	
Anarchy Online	Active	3D	Science fiction	Freemium	2001			
Angels Online	Active	2D	Fantasy	Freemium	2006			Downloadable client (Windows only)
ArcheAge	Closed	3D	Fantasy	Freemium	2013	2024		Open-sandbox player built world, large-scale crafting interactions (building own ship to sail with, etc.)
Argentum Online	Active	2D	Medieval fantasy	Free-to-play	1999			
Ashen Empires	Active	2D (isometric)	Fantasy	Freemium	2002			Housing, Guilds, 3 Expansions, Downloadable client (Windows only)
Asheron's Call	Closed	3D	Fantasy	Pay-to-play	1999	2017		Has player housing
Asheron's Call 2	Closed	3D	Fantasy	Pay-to-play	2002	2005, 2017		
Ashes of Creation	Closed	3D	Fantasy	Pay-to-play	N/A			Removed from sale on Steam after the development studio closed.
Astonia III	Active	2D	Fantasy	Free-to-play	2001			Originally pay-to-play until 2014 when the official servers shut down and the creator released the source code; thus, multiple fan-made communities emerged.
Atlantica Online	Active	3D	Fantasy	Free-to-play	2008			Turn-based strategy
Atriarch	Terminated	3D	Science fiction	Unknown	N/A			
Aura Kingdom	Active	3D	Fantasy	Free-to-play	2014			
Battle of the Immortals	Closed	3D	Fantasy	Free-to-play	2010	2018		Battle of the Immortals features an expansive pet system, a mount upgrade system, and six playable classes.
Battlestar Galactica Online	Closed	3D	Science fiction	Free-to-play	2011	2019		Browser-based, Battlestar Galactica license
Black Desert Online	Active	3D	Medieval fantasy	Freemium (Asia), Buy-to-play (EU/NA)	2014 (Korea); 2016 (EU/NA)		Steam	Open-sandbox player built world - Manual aim action combat
Blade & Soul	Active	3D	Fantasy, martial arts	Freemium	2012			Manual aim action combat (within melee/short ranged combat)
Blood Wars	Active	Text-based	Post-apocalyptic	Free-to-play	2006		Browser	
Boundless	Active	3D	Space fantasy	Buy-to-play (EU/NA)	2018		Steam	Open-sandbox player built worlds, crafting, gear forging, portals, meteors, mining, planet rentals.
Cabal Online	Active	3D	Fantasy	Free-to-play	2005			
Camelot Unchained	Development	3D	Fantasy, Mythology (Arthurian)(Celtic)(Norse)	Pay-to-play	2020			
Champions of Regnum	Active	3D	Medieval fantasy	Freemium	2007			Originally Regnum Online
Champions Online	Active	3D	Superheroes	Freemium	2009			
Chronicles of Elyria	Terminated	3D	Fantasy	Buy-to-play	N/A			Development began in 2016 and ran until layoffs at Soulbound Studios in 2020; the studio and pro bono production closed in 2026.
City of Heroes	Closed	3D	Superheroes	Freemium	2004	2012		Formerly pay-to-play
City of Villains	Closed	3D	Superheroes	Freemium	2005	2012		
Clan Lord	Active	2D	Fantasy	Pay for account; free-to-play	1998			Downloadable client for Windows & Mac
CrimeCraft	Closed	3D	Crime	Free-to-play	2009	2017	Standalone & Steam	
Clone Wars Adventures	Closed	3D	Sci-fi	Free-to-play	2010	2014		Star Wars
Dark Age of Camelot	Active	3D	Mythology (Arthurian, Celtic, and Norse)	Pay-to-play; Free-to-play (2019)	2001			
Dark Ages	Active	2D	Mythology (Celtic)	Pay for account; free-to-play	1999			
Dark and Light	Closed	3D	Fantasy	Pay-to-play	2006	2008		
Darkeden	South Korea	2D	Horror	Freemium	2002	2018 (West)	Standalone & Steam	Western servers closed in 2018, still running in South Korea.
Darkfall	Closed	3D	Fantasy	Pay-to-play	2009	2012		Independent development continues as Darkfall: New Dawn and Rise of Agon.
Darkfall Unholy Wars	Closed	3D	Medieval fantasy	Pay-to-play	2013	2016		
DarkSpace	Active	3D	Science fiction	Free-to-play	2001			Open source
DC Universe Online	Active	3D	Superheroes	Freemium	2011			Base game is free-to-play with restrictions
Dead Frontier	Active	3D	Horror	Freemium	2008			Pay for extras, Browser-based
Defiance	Closed	3D	Post-apocalyptic	Free-to-play	2013	2021		Tie-in to the Syfy show of the same name
Digimon Battle Online	Active	3D	Fantasy	Freemium	2002			Western servers closed in 2013. Western servers re-opened in 2022.
Digimon Masters	Active	3D	Fantasy	Freemium	2009		Steam	
Dofus	Active	2D (isometric)	Fantasy	Freemium	2004			Downloadable client (Windows, Mac, Linux); Tactical combat
Domain of Heroes	Closed	Text-based	Fantasy	Free-to-play	2008	2017		
Dragon Ball Online	Closed	3D	Fantasy	Free-to-play	2010	2013		Downloadable client (Windows, Mac, Linux); Tactical combat
Dragon Nest	Active	3D	Fantasy	Freemium	2010			Manual aim action combat
Dragon Oath	China	3D	Mythology (Chinese)	Free-to-play	2007			Based on the novel Demi-Gods and Semi-Devils by Jin Yong
Dragon Quest X Online	Japan	3D	Fantasy	Pay-to-play	2012			Multiplatform: Wii, Wii U
Dragon Saga	Active	3D	Fantasy	Freemium	2009			Re-branded from "Dragonica" in 2010.
Dragon's Prophet	Closed	3D	Fantasy	Free-to-play	2013	2015 (US); 2020 (EU); 2020 (Taiwan)		Capture, train and ride dragons, fight with them
Drakensang Online	Active	3D	Fantasy	Freemium	2012			Uses downloadable client and launcher
Dungeons & Dragons Online	Active	3D	Fantasy	Freemium	2006		Steam	D&D 3.5 Edition ruleset
Dynasty Warriors Online	Closed	3D	Historical fantasy (China), martial arts	Free-to-play	2006	2014		Hack and slash
Earth and Beyond	Closed	3D	Science fiction	Pay-to-play	2002	2004		Space vehicle piloting, trading, leveling
Echo of Soul	Active	3D	Fantasy	Free-to-play	2013			
Eden Eternal	Active	3D	Fantasy	Free-to-play	2010	2021		
The Elder Scrolls Online	Active	3D	Medieval fantasy	Buy-to-play with optional subscription model	2014		Steam	Manual aim action combat. Formerly a subscription based, but changed to buy-to-play on 2015-03-17.
Elsword	Active	2D (isometric)	Fantasy	Free-to-play	2007			Potential sequel to GC
Ember Sword	Closed	3D	Science fiction	Free-to-play, play-to-earn	2024 (Early access)	2025	Standalone & Browser	Servers shut down in May 2025.
Emil Chronicle Online	Closed	3D	Fantasy	Freemium	2005	2010		
Empire of Sports	Closed	3D	Modern sports	Free-to-play	2008	2016		Sports-based
Empire & State	Active	2D	Science fiction	Free-to-play	2011			Browser-based political strategy MMORPG
Entropia Universe	Active	3D	Science fiction	Free-to-play	2003			
eRepublik	Active	Text-based	Real world simulation	Free-to-play	2008		Browser	
Ether Saga Odyssey	Closed	3D	Fantasy (Chinese)	Free-to-play	2009	2016	Standalone Launcher	
EVE Online	Active	3D	Science fiction	Freemium	2003		Steam	Space vehicle piloting, trading, and business management
EverQuest	Active	3D	Fantasy	Freemium	1999		Steam	Formerly pay-to-play
EverQuest II	Active	3D	Fantasy	Freemium	2004		Steam	Sequel to EverQuest
Elyon (video game)	Closed	3D	Fantasy	F2P	2021	2022	Steam/Launcher	Similar to Tera, Manual Action Combat
Face of Mankind	Closed	3D	Science fiction	Freemium	2009	2015		
Fighting Legends Online	Closed	3D	Fantasy	Freemium	2001			
Fallen Earth	Closed	3D	Post-apocalyptic	Freemium	2009	2019		
Fantage	Closed	2D	Fantasy	Freemium	2008	2018		Browser-based
Fantasy Earth Zero	Closed	3D	Fantasy	Free-to-play	2006	2020		50vs50 PvP-oriented gameplay
Fantasy Westward Journey	Active	2D	Fantasy (Chinese)	Free-to-play	2004			Inspired by Journey to the West
Fiesta Online	Active	3D	Fantasy	Free-to-play	2007			Publisher: Gamigo
Final Fantasy XI	Active	3D	Fantasy	Pay-to-play	2002			
Final Fantasy XIV (original)	Closed	3D	Fantasy	Pay-to-play	2010	2012		
Final Fantasy XIV (A Realm Reborn)	Active	3D	Fantasy	Freemium with an optional subscription	2013		Standalone & Steam	Relaunch of Final Fantasy XIV. Now known as Final Fantasy XIV: Dawntrail with the latest expansion. Has a free trial up to level 80 with the Heavensword Stormblood and Shadowbingers expansion that have no restriction on playtime.
Firefall	Closed	3D	Science fiction	Free-to-play	2014	2017		First-person/third-person shooter
Flyff	13 countries	3D	Fantasy	Freemium	2005			
Fragoria	Active	3D	Fantasy	Freemium	2011			Browser-based
Free Realms	Closed	3D	Fantasy	Free-to-play	2009	2014		
Gekkeiju Online	Closed	3D	Medieval fantasy	Free-to-play	2003	2020		Anime-based. New version in 2010 with ""Occulus Rift"" support
GemStone IV	Active	Text-based	Fantasy, MUD	Freemium	1988-04 (2003-11)		Browser	Evolved from GemStone (1988) through development and renaming. Pay-to-play, with free-to-play option since March 2015.
GodsWar Online	Active	3D	Mythology (Greek)	Free-to-play	2009			
Granado Espada	Active	3D	Historical fantasy (Age of Exploration)	Pay-to-play	2007			
Grand Chase	Active	2D	Fantasy	Free-to-play	2003, 2021 (Relaunch)	2015	Launcher (original run), Steam (relaunch)	Client download required. Relaunched on Steam as "Grand Chase: Classic"
Guild Wars	Active	3D	Fantasy	Buy-to-play	2005		Steam	
Guild Wars 2	Active	3D	Fantasy	Free-to-play / Buy-to-play	2012		Launcher & Steam	Open world, fantasy, instances, Manual aim action combat (guided, optional); became free to play, 4 expansions, Sequel to Guild Wars
Hello Kitty Online	Closed	3D	Cartoon	Free-to-play	2009	2017		Client download required.
Hero Online	Active	3D	Mythology (Chinese)	Free-to-play	2006			
Hypixel SkyBlock	Active	3D	Fantasy	Free-to-play	2019			Played on the Hypixel Minecraft server.
Illyriad	Active	2D	Fantasy	Free-to-play	2011			Browser Based
Infantry Online	Active	2D	Science fiction	Free-to-play	1999			Shut down 2012, relaunched by community.
Istaria: Chronicles of the Gifted	Active	3D	Fantasy	Free-to-play / Pay-to-play	2003			Name changed from Horizons
Jade Dynasty	Closed	3D	Fantasy, martial arts	Freemium	2008	2018		Last expansion in 2013
Knight Online	Active	3D	Fantasy	Free-to-play	2004		Steam	
LaTale	Active	2D (side-scrolling)	Fantasy	Freemium	2009			
The Legend of Ares	Closed	3D	Fantasy	Free-to-play	2007	2009		
The Legend of Mir 2	China; South Korea	2D (sprite-based)	Fantasy	Free-to-play	2001			European and North American servers closed 2009 and 2012.
The Legend of Mir 3	Closed	2D (sprite-based)	Fantasy	Pay-to-play	2004	2012		Sequel to The Legend of Mir 2
Lineage	Asia	2D (sprite-based)	Fantasy	Pay-to-play	1998			North American servers shut down on 2011-06-29.
Lineage II	Active	3D	Fantasy	Freemium	2003			Sequel to Lineage, formerly pay-to-play until the 2011 expansion
The Lord of the Rings Online	Active	3D	Fantasy	Freemium	2007		Standalone & Steam	Formerly pay-to-play
Lost Ark	Active	3D Isometric	Medieval fantasy	Free-to-play with optional subscription model	2019 (Korea); 2022 (Global)		Steam	
Love	Active	3D	Fantasy	Free-to-play	2010			Builder
Mabinogi	East Asia; North America	3D	Fantasy, mythology (Welsh)	Free-to-play	2004		Steam	
MapleStory	Active	2D (side-scrolling)	Fantasy	Free-to-play	2003		Launcher; Steam (GMS only)	
MapleStory 2	Closed	3D	Fantasy	Free-to-play	2015	2020 (Global, Japan), 2022 (China), 2025 (Korea)		Sequel to MapleStory
Marvel Heroes	Closed	3D	Superheroes	Free-to-play	2013	2017		
Master of Epic	Active	3D	Fantasy	Free-to-play	2005			Has not been released outside of Japan
The Matrix Online	Closed	3D	Science fiction	Pay-to-play	2005	2009		
Meridian 59	Active	2.5D	Fantasy	Free-to-play	1996			Formerly pay-to-play
Metin2	Active	3D	Fantasy	Freemium	2004			Publisher: Gameforge
Minions of Mirth	Closed	3D	Fantasy	Freemium	2005	2017		
MonsterMMORPG	Active	2D	Fantasy	Free-to-play	2009			Browser-based
Mortal Online	Active	3D	Fantasy	Free-to-play	2010		Steam	Formerly pay-to-play
Mortal Online 2	Active	3D	Fantasy	Pay-to-play	2022		Steam	
MU Online	Active	3D	Medieval fantasy	Free-to-play	2001 (Korea) 2003 (Global)		Browser	Downloable client (only Windows)
Myst Online: Uru Live	Active	3D	Ancient fantasy	Free-to-play	2007			Online version of Uru: Ages Beyond Myst; Open source; formerly pay-to-play; multiplayer adventure game; customizable homeworld; development led by the game's community
Mythos	Closed	3D	Fantasy	Free-to-play	2011	2014		
Neocron	Active	3D	Cyberpunk	Free-to-play	2002 2026 (Relaunch)		Standalone	FPS-style gameplay
Neocron 2: Beyond Dome of York	Active	3D	Cyberpunk	Free-to-play	2004 2016 (Relaunch)||	Standalone (Neocron Evolution)	FPS-style gameplay, second installment run by the game's community	
NEStalgia	Closed	2D	Fantasy	Buy-to-play	2011	2018		
Neverwinter	Active	3D	Fantasy	Freemium	2013		Steam	Manual aim action combat
New World	Active	3D	Fantasy	Buy-to-play	2021		Steam	Publisher: Amazon Games
Nexus: The Kingdom of the Winds	Active	2D (sprite-based; overhead)	Mythology (Korean)	Pay-to-play	1996			
Old School RuneScape	Active	3D	Medieval fantasy	Freemium, but with bulk of content pay-to-play	2013		Standalone & Steam	Java-based fork of the 2007 version of RuneScape 2, started in 2013
Omerta	Active	Text-based	Crime (mafia)	Free-to-play	2003		Browser	Mafia-themed
Order and Chaos Online	Closed	3D	Fantasy	Free-to-play	2011	2023		
Order & Chaos 2: Redemption	Active	3D	Fantasy	Free-to-play	2015			
Pantheon: Rise of the Fallen	Development	3D	Fantasy		TBA			Spiritual successor to the original EverQuest
Parallel Kingdom	Closed	3D	Fantasy	Freemium	2008	2016	iOS, Android	
Pardus	Active	2D	Science fiction	Free-to-play	2004			Browser-based, space war and trading game
Perfect World	Active	3D	Fantasy (Chinese)	Freemium	2005			Latest expansion in 2018
Pax Dei	Development	3D	Fantasy		TBA			
Perpetuum	Active	3D	Science fiction (Mech)	Free	2010		Steam	Persistent sandbox MMORPG.
Phantasy Star Online	Closed	3D	Science fiction	Buy-to-play	2000	2010		
Phantasy Star Online 2	Active	3D	Science fiction	Freemium	2012			
Phoenix Dynasty Online	Closed	2D	Fantasy	Free-to-play	2007	2010		
Pirate101	Active	3D	Fantasy, kids	Freemium	2012			Pirate game, kid-safe chat
Pirates of the Burning Sea	Active	3D	Historical (maritime)	Free-to-play	2008			Vision Online Games takeover 2019
Pirates of the Caribbean Online	Closed	3D	Adventure	Free-to-play	2007	2013		
PlaneShift	Active	3D	Fantasy	Free-to-play	2002			Open source
Playmobil WORLD	Closed	3D	Medieval fantasy	Free-to-play	2011	2014		Browser-based
Poptropica	Active	2D (side-scrolling)	Cartoon, kids	Freemium	2007			Browser-based, no downloadable client required
Prime World	Closed	2D (isometric)	Fantasy	Freemium	2014	2021		
Priston Tale	Active	3D	Fantasy	Freemium	2001			
Priston Tale 2	Closed	3D	Fantasy	Freemium	2008	2013		
Throne and Liberty	Active	3D	Fantasy		2024			Sequel to Lineage II, previously announced as Lineage Eternal and Lineage III
Puppet Guardian	Closed	2D (isometric; adventure)	Fantasy	Free-to-play	2007	2014		
Puzzle Pirates	Active	2D	Fantasy	Free-to-play	2003			
Ragnarok Online	CIS countries North America	2D/3D	Fantasy, mythology (Norse/mixed)	Freemium/Pay-to-play (Depending on the server)	2002	2018 (Europe); 2021 (MSP)	Steam	Servers shut down in most of Europe 2018, excluding CIS countries. Malaysia, Singapore, Philippines (MSP) server closed 2021.
Ragnarok Online 2	CIS countries North America	3D	Fantasy	Free-to-play	2012	2014 (Korea); 2014 (SEA); 2018 (Europe)	Steam	Sequel to Ragnarok Online. Servers shut down in South Korea, Southeast Asia, and most of Europe excluding CIS countries.
Ran Online	Closed	3D	Campus fantasy	Freemium	2004	2021		
Rappelz	Active	3D	Medieval fantasy	Free-to-play	2006	2016 (SEA)		Servers active in Europe, North America, MENA, Japan, and Korea. SEA server closed 2016.
Realm of the Mad God	Active	2D	Fantasy	Free-to-play	2011		Steam	Browser-based
The Realm Online	Active	2D (sprite-based)	Fantasy	Free-to-play	1996			Buy-to-play until 2018-06-01
Red Stone	Active	2D	Fantasy	Free-to-play	2004			
Requiem: Memento Mori	North America; South Korea	3D	Dark fantasy	Free-to-play	2008			
RF Online	Europe; North America; South Korea	3D	Science fiction	Pay-to-play	2006			
Rift	Europe; North America	3D	Fantasy	Free-to-play	2011		Steam	Formerly pay-to-play
Rohan: Blood Feud	East Asia, SEA; North America	3D	Fantasy	Freemium	2008			
ROSE Online	Active	3D	Fantasy	Free-to-play	2005	2019		
Royal Quest	Closed	2D (isometric)	Fantasy	Freemium	2015	2020		
Rubies of Eventide	Closed	3D	Medieval fantasy	Free-to-play	2003	2009		
Runes of Magic	Active	3D	Medieval fantasy	Freemium	2009			Publisher: Gameforge
RuneScape	Active	3D	Medieval fantasy	Freemium, but with bulk of content pay-to-play	2001		Standalone & Steam	RuneScape has been developed continuously since 2001. It is sometimes referred to as RuneScape 3 to distinguish it from Old School RuneScape, which was forked from its 2007 version in 2013.
Rusty Hearts	Closed	3D	Fantasy	Free-to-play	2011	2014		Hack and slash
Ryzom	Europe; North America	3D	Science fantasy	Freemium	2004		Steam	Free-to-play (up to level 125), pay-to-play (to max level). Open source
Salem	Active	3D	Historical (17th century) fantasy	Free-to-play	2012		Standalone	Crafting-based
Sangokushi Online	Closed	3D	Historical (Chinese)	Pay-to-play	2008	2010		Part of the Romance of the Three Kingdoms series by Koei
Scions of Fate	East Asia; Indonesia; USA	3D	Fantasy	Free-to-play	2005			Korean name: Yulgang.
Seal Online	East Asia; USA	3D	Fantasy	Freemium	2003			
The Secret World	Europe; North America	3D	Modern	Buy-to-play	2012		Steam	Formerly pay-to-play
Shadowbane	Closed	3D	Fantasy	Pay-to-play	2003	2009		Switched to "free-to-play" on 2006-03-15, supported by ads
Shin Megami Tensei: Imagine	Closed	3D	Fantasy	Free-to-play	2007	2016		
Shot-Online	Active	3D	Sports (golf)	Freemium	2004			
Shroud of the Avatar: Forsaken Virtues	Active	3D	Fantasy	Free-to-play	2018			Spiritual successor to the Ultima series
Silkroad Online	China; Europe; USA	3D	Fantasy	Free-to-play	2005			Servers in China, Europe and USA.
Skyforge	Closed	3D	Fantasy (Mythic/Sci-fi)	Freemium	2015			Russian-based developers. Manual aim action combat
Soul of the Ultimate Nation	Closed	3D	Fantasy	Pay-to-play	2007	2013		
Space Heroes Universe!	Closed	2D	Kids	Freemium	2011	2015		Originally Little Space Heroes
Spiral Knights	Active	3D	Fantasy	Freemium	2009		Steam & Standalone	Java
StarQuest Online	Closed	3D	Science fiction	Free-to-play	2007	2014		Downloadable client (Windows)
Star Citizen	Development	3D	Science fiction	Buy-to-play			Standalone	Currently in alpha
Star Trek Online	Active	3D	Science fiction	Freemium	2010			Switched to "free-to-play" on 2012-01-17
Star Wars Combine	Active	2D	Science fiction	Free-to-play	1998		Browser	Spiritual sequel of a mid-90s Internet game called Star Wars Simulation
Star Wars Galaxies	Closed	3D	Science fiction	Pay-to-play	2003	2011		First Star Wars MMORPG, using a "sandbox" approach with a player-driven economy.
Star Wars: The Old Republic	Active	3D	Science fiction	Freemium with optional subscription model	2011		Standalone & Steam	Spiritual sequel of 2003's Game of the year Star Wars: Knights of the Old Republic, formerly pay-to-play
Stellar Dawn	Terminated	3D	Science fiction		N/A			Development started back in 2006 as MechScape (scrapped in 2009). In 2010 Stellar Dawn was announced, in March 2012 Jagex paused development. Paused indefinitely 2015.
Tabula Rasa	Closed	3D	Science fiction	Pay-to-play	2007	2009		
A Tale in the Desert	Active	3D	Mythology (Egyptian)	Pay-to-play	2003		Standalone	Non-combat-oriented RPG
Tales of Pirates	Closed	3D	Fantasy (Maritime)	Free-to-play	2007	2016		During 2010 server data was transferred to a revamped client called Tales of Pirates II
TERA: Rising	Console only	3D	Fantasy	Freemium	2011		Steam, consoles	Manual aim action combat (True Action combat)
Terra	Active	3D	Science fiction	Free-to-play	1996			
The Chronicles of Spellborn	Closed	3D	Fantasy	Free-to-play / Pay-to-play	2008	2010	Standalone	
Tibia	Active	2D (sprite-based; overhead)	Fantasy	Free-to-play	1997			Downloadable client (Windows, Linux).
Toontown Online	Closed	3D	Fantasy, Cartoon	Freemium	2003	2013		Designed for families, mostly targeted towards children.
Toontown Rewritten	Active	3D	Fantasy, Cartoon	Free-to-play	2014		Standalone	Fan-made revival of Toontown Online, created using publicly available downloads and information.
Torn	Active	Text	Crime (mafia)	Free-to-play	2004		Browser	Mafia-themed
Tower of Fantasy	Active	3D	Science fiction	Free-to-play	2021		Steam, PC Launcher, iOS, Android, PlayStation	Open world, action combat
Trickster Online	Closed	2D (isometric; adventure)	Fantasy, Mythology (Greek/mixed)	Free-to-play	2003	2014		
Trove	Active	3D	Fantasy, Cartoon	Freemium	2013			
Twelve Sky	Closed	3D	Fantasy	Free-to-play	2007	2010		
Twelve Sky 2	East Asia, SEA; Europe; North America	3D	Fantasy	Free-to-play	2008			
Ultima Online	Active	2D/3D Isometric	Medieval fantasy	Subscription	1997			The term MMORPG was first coined by Ultima Online creator Richard Garriott in 1997.
Uncharted Waters Online	Active	3D	Historical (maritime)	Free-to-play (on international server)	2005 (Japan); 2010 (West)			
Underlight	Active	2.5D	Fantasy (Dream)	Free-to-play	1998		Standalone & Steam	Original servers were shut down in December 2006. Re-launched in September 2014 by KoiWare.
Vanguard: Saga of Heroes	Closed	3D	Fantasy	Pay-to-play	2007	2014		
Vendetta Online	Active	3D	Science fiction	Free-to-play	2004		Cross-platform	Space vehicle piloting and twitch-based interface
Villagers & Heroes	Active	3D	Fantasy	Free-to-play	2011		Cross-platform	
Vindictus	Active	3D	Fantasy (Celtic)	Free-to-play	2010		Steam	Manual aim action combat
Voyage Century Online	Active	3D	Historical (maritime)	Free-to-play	2006			Many localised language versions shut down in 2010s: German, French, Spanish, Portuguese, Turkish.
Wakfu	Active	2D (isometric)	Fantasy	Freemium	2012			Downloadable client (Windows, Mac, Linux). Tactical combat.
Warhammer Online: Age of Reckoning	Closed	3D	Fantasy	Freemium	2008	2013		
WildStar	Closed	3D	Fantasy, Science fiction	Free-to-play	2014	2018		Manual aim action combat (telegraphed). Became free-to-play on 2015-09-29
With Your Destiny	Active	3D	Fantasy (Scandinavian)	Free-to-play	2003			
Wizard101	Australasia; Europe; North America	3D	Fantasy, kids	Freemium	2008	2015 (China & Taiwan)		Wizard game with cards, kid-safe chat. China & Taiwan servers shut down late 2015.
Wizardry Online	Closed	3D	Fantasy	Freemium	2013	2014		Based on Wizardry series
WonderKing Online	Closed	2D (side-scrolling)	Fantasy	Free-to-play	2006	2011		
Wonderland Online	Closed	2D (special)	Fantasy	Free-to-play	2008	2019		Anime/Manga based
World of the Living Dead	Closed	2D	Survival strategy	Free-to-play	2014	2014		Map-Based Survival Game with PvP, Factions, Customization, Upgrades & Crafting.
World of Warcraft	Active	3D	Fantasy	Subscription	2004		Launcher	Free-to-play until level 20
Wurm Online	Active	3D	Medieval fantasy	Freemium	2006			Sandbox game with hundreds of skills, multiple kingdoms, and a deep crafting system.
Wynncraft	Active	3D	Fantasy	Platform is buy-to-play, server is free-to-play	2013		Minecraft	Inspired by Runescape. Includes completing quests, joining guilds, completing dungeons and raids, and fighting bosses
Xsyon	Early access	3D	Apocalyptic fantasy	Buy-to-play	2011		Steam	Apocalyptic fantasy sandbox. Early access since 2011. Pay-to-play 2012–2015, freemium 2012–2014.
Yogurting	Closed	3D	Modern		2005	2011		Anime-based. Set in modern school life.
Zhengtu	Closed	2D	Mythology (Chinese)	Freemium	2008	2018		
Blue Protocol: Star Resonance	Active	3D	Fantasy	Free-to-play	2025		Steam	

== See also ==
- List of MMOGs
- List of free MMOGs
- List of MUDs
- List of multiplayer browser games
- History of MMORPGs
- Online game
- Turn-based MMORPG
