= Open Network Entertainment =

Open Network Entertainment (ONE)
- Type: Private
- Industry: Video games
- Founded: Englewood Cliffs, New Jersey (2009)
- Key people: Peter Grubb (Vice President, Sales & Marketing)
- Website: ONE website

Open Network Entertainment (ONE) is a joint venture between parent company LTI Global, Inc./ Locus Communications (a US-based marketer and distributor of prepaid products including phone cards) and Korean company PayLetter, Inc. (a service provider handling content related and micro-transaction billing processes). The company was created in 2009 with the stated mission of “providing value added services to online game publishers, retailers and gamers” through game cards available at retail stores and online.

== Products ==
=== ONE Universal Power-Up Game Card ===
In October 2009, ONE announced the availability of its first product, the ONE Universal Power-Up Game Card, a prepaid game card that enables purchasers to play a variety of massively multiplayer online games and purchase virtual goods within those games (micro-transactions). The cards are carried in Rite-Aid stores in North America and are available in denominations of $10 and $20. Customers may add more currency to the card in order to maintain its use.

== Games Playable using the ONE Power-Up Game Card ==
Game	Developer
Asda Story	OnNet USA
Atlantica Online	Ndoors
Cue Online	OnNet USA
Dragon Sky	Aeria Games
Dream of Mirror Online	Aeria Games
Fantage	Fantage
FreeStyle Street Basketball	JCE GSP
Last Chaos	Aeria Games
Luminary: Rise of the Goonzu	Ndoors
Manga Fighter	OnNet USA
MLB Dugout Heroes	OnNet USA
Project Torque	Aeria Games
Shaiya	Aeria Games
Shot Online 2009	OnNet USA
Sudden Attack	GameHi
Turf Battles	Smilegate
Twelve Sky	Aeria Games
Twelve Sky 2	Aeria Games
Wolf Team	Aeria Games
Xiah Rebirth	OnNet USA
