= SQO =

SQO or sqo may refer to:

- Sorkhei language, spoken in Iran.
- Standard Query Operator
- StarQuest Online
- Storuman Airport, serving Storuman, Sweden
