= Neverness to Everness =

2026 action role-playing video game

- Developer: Hotta Studio
- Publisher: Perfect World Games
- Director: Kee Zhang
- Producer: Yang Lei
- Engine: Unreal Engine 5
- Platforms: Android; iOS; HarmonyOS; Windows; macOS; PlayStation 5
- Release: CN: April 23, 2026; WW: April 29, 2026
- Genres: Action role-playing, gacha
- Modes: Single-player, multiplayer

Neverness to Everness (NTE; simplified Chinese: 异环; traditional Chinese: 異環; pinyin: Yì Huán, lit. 'Strange Ring') is an open world action role-playing hack and slash game developed by Hotta Studio, a subsidiary of Perfect World. In the city of Hethereau, the player is an Appraiser who explores the open world and fights hostile forces.

== Gameplay ==
The game is a 3D action role-playing game played with a 3rd-person view. The player controls different characters and collects items as they travel around in the open virtual world. The player character can run, jump, sprint, climb, swim, and drive various vehicles to move around in the world. The character's special movements, except for sprinting, are limited by a regenerating stamina bar that slowly depletes as they continue in that movement mode. Each character has different skills, called Esper Abilities, which synergize with other characters.

Players are able to switch between characters in a team of 4, and can perform common hack and slash gameplay mechanics like basic dodges, perfect dodges, and parries. Characters also have different Esper types which are split into Lakshana, Cosmos, Anima, Incantation, Chaos and Psyche. There are also class types which are split into the gas, solid, liquid, plasma, and synthesis.

The game features vehicle customization and upgrading business.

== Plot ==
Neverness to Everness takes place in Hethereau, a modern fictional metropolis where supernatural anomalies and everyday urban life coexist. As an Appraiser, players are tasked with investigating these anomalies, manifestations that range from disturbances to overtly dangerous phenomena, and using Esper abilities to contain or neutralize them.

As the Appraiser delves deeper into the anomalies, they encounter a rotating cast of companions with their own Esper powers that are crucial for unraveling the larger mysteries of Hethereau. These characters help reveal how the anomalies affect different parts of the city and its inhabitants. Their interactions and investigations gradually uncover a layered web of cause and effect behind the supernatural occurrences.

== Development and release ==
Neverness to Everness is produced by Suzhou-based Hotta Studio, a subsidiary of Perfect World Games. The game was developed in Unreal Engine 5.

The combination of Hotta Studio developers enjoying making Mirroria (a cyberpunk city) for their previous title, Tower of Fantasy, and the positive feedback from players, inspired them to make an open world game. Their "year and a half" experience developing urban content helped them complete Neverness to Everness in less than two years.

Neverness to Everness was first officially announced, via the release of a promotional video, on July 16, 2024. In November 2024, the game held its first closed beta in China. A global closed beta test followed in July 2025, with a second and final global closed beta conducted in February 2026.

Neverness to Everness launched in China on April 23, 2026, and worldwide on April 29.

In July 2026, Neverness to Everness launched in Steam, Epic Games Store and Samsung Galaxy Store.

== Reception ==
On launch day, Neverness to Everness generated CN¥ 100,000,000 in revenue globally across all platforms.

As of August 2026, the game's PlayStation 5 version has a review score of 73 on Metacritic, indicating "mixed or average reviews" for the platform. The game's Steam version's reviews are "Very Positive".

Reviewing for Nexus Hub, Ryan Pretorious gave the game's launch build a positive review, stating "Hotta Studio (of Tower of Fantasy fame) has taken the best elements of similar gacha titles, mixed in a healthy dose of Persona-esque slice of life goodness, and topped it all off with a thick layer of horror-inspired imagery and themes", scoring the game 8.5/10. He compared the side activities and open world elements to the Yakuza/Like A Dragon games and praised NTE's open world, rewarding gatcha system, light-hearted story elements, horror elements, combat system, side activities, and NPC interactions, but criticised some of the English translations, some English voice acting in "the early chapters", the dialogue box staying on-screen for too long, and the story's slow pacing in the first chapters; however they stated "Once the introductory phase steps back, the story quickly shifts to more exciting areas."

Scott Adams from The Outer Haven scored the game's launch build 4 out of 5, comparing the open-world to the Grand Theft Auto series and praising the game's combat, open world, activities, and "generous" gatcha system, but criticising its overwhelming amount of content and the large amount of "elements from other games" that it "doesn't do as much as those specific games" with.

In a more mixed review, Miles Penrith from PSU scored the game 6.5/10 on launch, praising the open world, activities, graphics, and the "Lights On" and "Flipped Phone Booth" side missions, but calling the story "underdeveloped" and criticising the rest of the game's side missions, the story's "abrupt" ending, the small open-world, the menu navigation, and launch state's ease of combat. However, Penrith stated the game "is decent quality for a free-to-play game" and further praised the fact the player isn't forced to spend money to enhance their progression.

=== AI usage controversy ===
In the days after Neverness to Everness was released, players accused the game of using AI art and AI-generated video. Multiple associates of NTE reacted publicly to the controversy. Ironmouse, a VTuber who produced sponsored content for the game, ended her partnership with Hotta Studio and claimed they told her that there would be no generative AI assets in the game. Shylily, a VTuber ended her sponsored NTE livestream early after being notified of suspected AI generated assets. Meggie Elise, an English voice actor for NTE made a post on X many believe was aimed at Hotta Studio for "using AI and has been dishonest about it" and stating “If this is not addressed and removed, I will not be continuing work with this team.”. NTE's executive producer Yang Lei disclosed use of AI assets in NTE before the game was released. Hotta Studio issued a statement via the official NTE X account, writing that "AI-assisted tools were used only on a small number of background and environmental assets, not on the characters or stories that define this game." They also announced that they would review and rework the relevant assets.

Community response to Hotta's statement was mostly positive. Many players were happy that Hotta was addressing the situation and were not bothered by AI usage, they also thought less AI generated artwork would improve the game. On the other hand, some commenters accused Hotta Studio of not addressing all AI generated content since they believed generative AI was used for NTE's advertising.

=== Awards ===
| Year | Award | Category | Result | Ref. |
|---|---|---|---|---|
| 2026 | Golden Joystick Awards | Still Playing Award (Mobile) | Nominated | |
| 2026 | The Game Awards | Best Mobile Game | Pending | |
