= GXD =

GXD may refer to:

- GXD, abbreviation for Gene Expression Database, resource defined by the Global Biodata Coalition
- GXD game engine, used to develop Twelve Sky 2
- GXD, Australian model for the Isuzu Forward commercial vehicle
