= Dreamlords =

2007 video game

- Developer(s): LockPick Entertainment
- Publisher(s): LockPick Entertainment, Paradox interactive (paradox plaza), Gamigo AG (Germany), Akella (Russia)
- Engine: Torque Game Engine Advanced
- Platform(s): Windows
- Release: February 15, 2007
- Genre(s): Massively multiplayer online real-time strategy
- Mode(s): Single player, multiplayer

Dreamlords was a massively multiplayer online real-time strategy (MMORTS) game, developed by Swedish game developers Lockpick Entertainment. Dreamlords was online only, and was free to play with an option to pay for additional benefit. It included in-game currency called Tribute that was used to buy items like spells to aid the players. The game used both a browser game and a downloadable real-time strategy client. Dreamlords also includes elements of role-playing video games.

== Development and release ==
The game was developed by Swedish game developers Lockpick Entertainment and the game was released on February 15, 2007. Metacritic, a review-aggregator website, gave the game an average score of 46/100 based on four reviews. A German version of the game was published by gamigo in July 2007. Dreamlords was acquired for North American release in July 2008 by Aeria Games and Entertainment and was re-launched in with new features and the new sub-title Dreamlords: The Reawakening. Dreamlords: The Reawakening closed on November 2, 2010.

The third iteration of the game, Dreamlords: Resurrection, was launched by Lockpick Entertainment in conjunction with Paradox Interactive on March 11, 2011. The game was supported by Paradox' online platform Paradox Connect that added community features. Dreamlords: Resurrection ran until September 28, 2011 when it was closed down.

== Gameplay ==
The game was free-to-play with no monthly costs. After Aeria Games acquired the game, optional items were available for purchase within the game's economy using Aeria Points. In the web-based game, players were given a section of land under their control. Tasks such as founding cities, researching technologies, building structures, and engaging in trade are accomplished through the web interface. Furthermore, players are given tasks to complete, build armies and can play either in cooperative PvE play or PvP combat.

With a downloaded client, the Dreamlords client functioned similar to a real-time strategy game. The client was used primarily to fight battles and do quests.
