= Chi Yufeng =

Chinese Internet entrepreneur

- 池宇峰
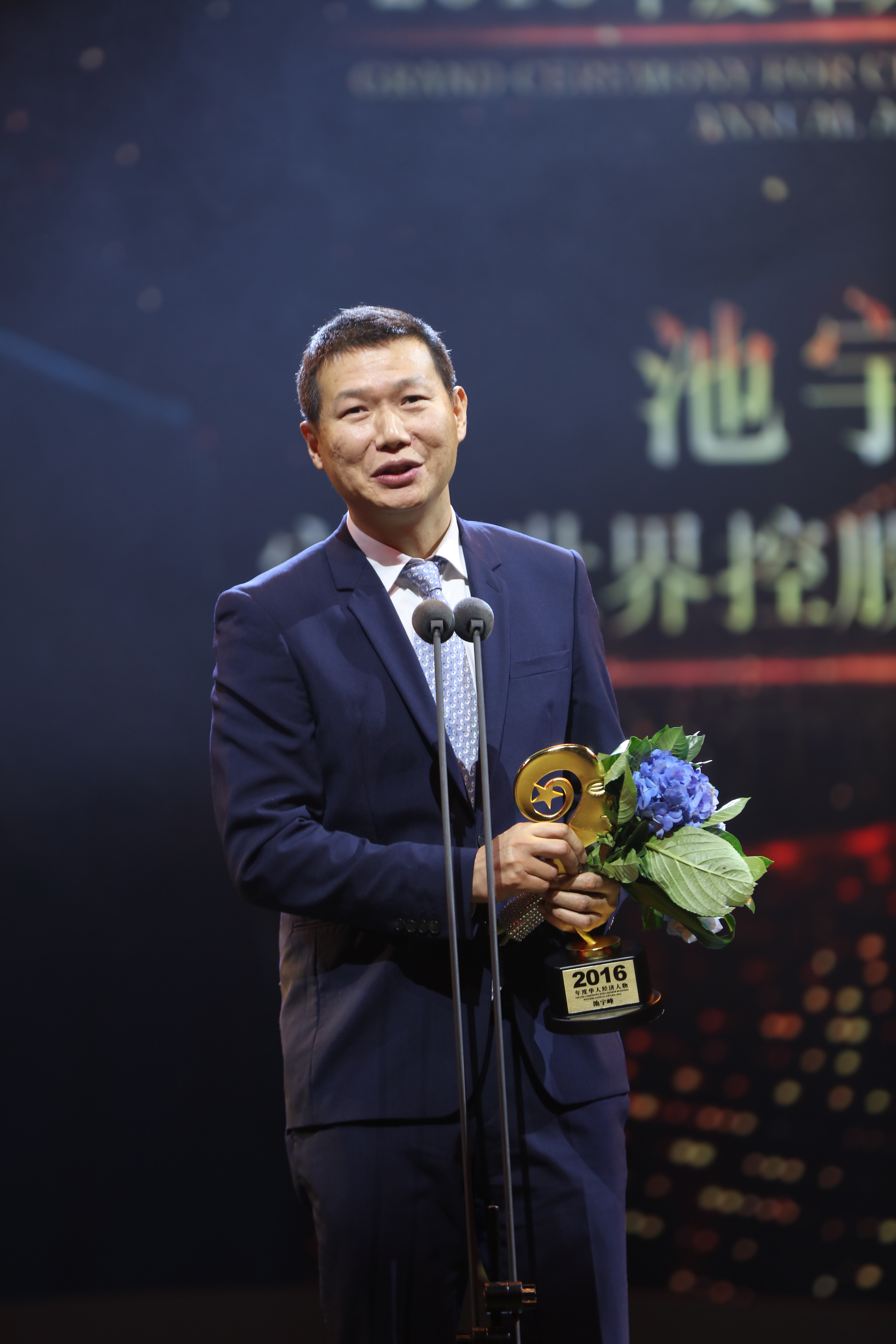
- Chi Yufeng at the Grand Ceremony for Chinese Business Figures Annual Award at Beijing University, Beijing, China, on December 13, 2016
- Born: September 15, 1971 (age 55)
- Education: Tsinghua University
- Occupations: Founder, Chairman and CEO of Perfect World; Chairman of Beijing Hongen Education and Technology

Michael Chi or Chi Yufeng (Chinese: 池宇峰; pinyin: Chí Yǔ Fēng; born on September 15, 1971) is a Chinese Internet entrepreneur. He is the founder and chairman of the Perfect World Investment & Holding Group, a China-based entertainment industry group.

== Education ==
Chi received his bachelor's degree in chemistry from Tsinghua University in 1994 and his Master of Business Administration degree from China Europe International Business School in 2004.

== Career ==
Chi founded Beijing Hongen Education and Technology Co., Ltd. in 1996. The company aimed to help millions of Chinese families learn to use computers in the 1990s. At present, Hongen educational products occupy a 50%-70% share of China market.

Chi founded Perfect World Games in 2004 and served as the CEO and then co-CEO until March 2013. Chi led the company's initial public offering on the Nasdaq in July, 2007. In January 2015, he submitted a proposal to the board of directors to take the company private and completed the privatization in April 2015.

Chi created Perfect World Pictures Co., Ltd. in 2008. And he led the asset reformation of Perfect World Pictures and Perfect World Games to list on China's A-shares market (ticker: 002624) in 2016.

Now, Perfect World is one of the largest Film & Game merging entertainment companies in China.

== Recognition ==
In 2001, Chi was named one of the “Outstanding Young Persons of China’s Software Industry”.

From 2007 to 2011, Chi was consecutively named one of “Most Influential Individuals in Chinese Game Industry”.

In 2010 Chi was selected as one of “The best 20 Influential Individuals in Global MMO Games area by Massive Online Gamer”.

In 2013 and 2015, he was selected as one of “Persons of the Year for China’s Internet Industry”.

In December 2016, Chi was named one of “2016 Chinese Business Figures of the Year”.
