= Perfect World (company) =

Chinese video game company

Perfect World Co., Ltd.

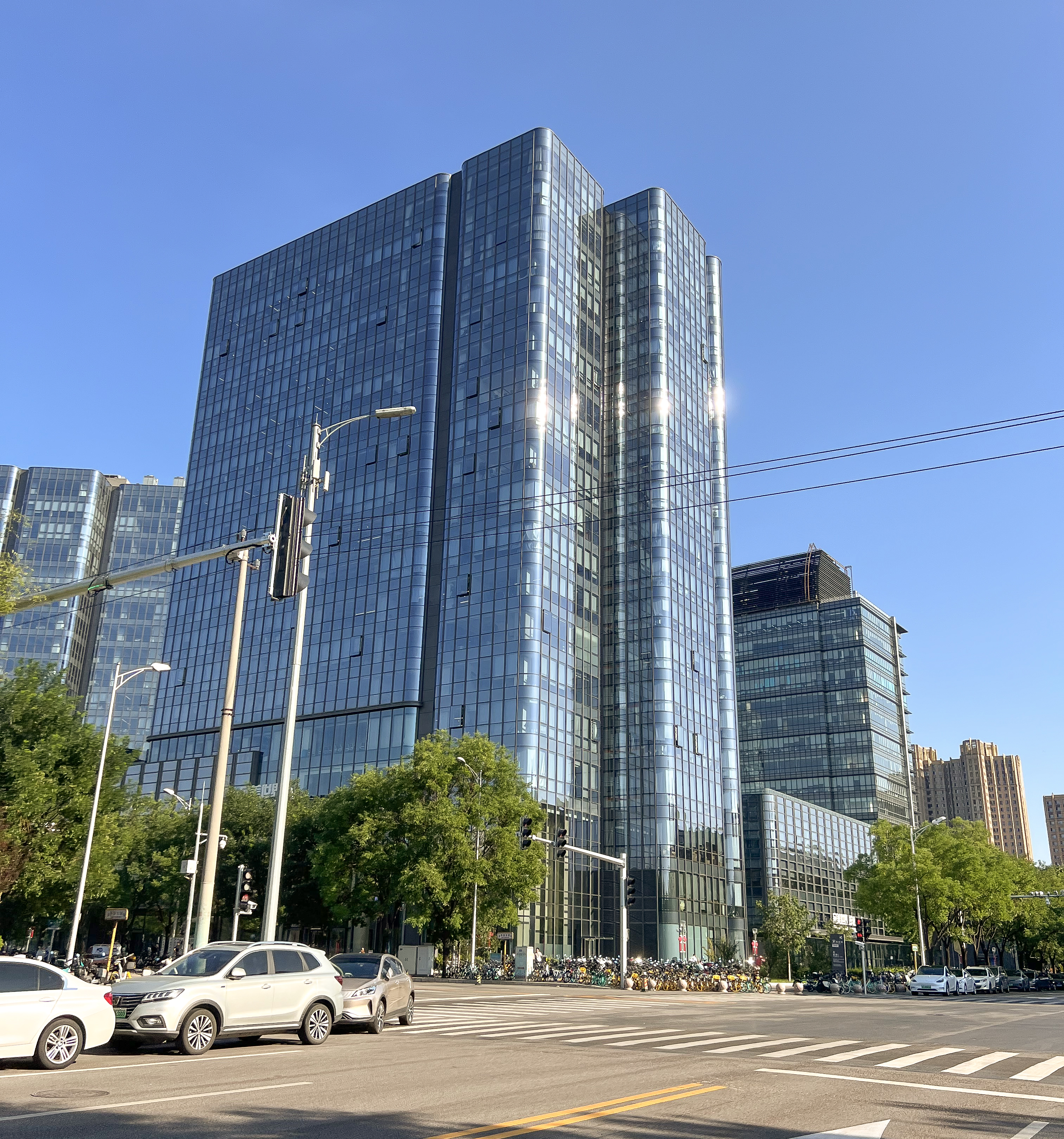
- Perfect World Beijing headquarters
- Native name: 完美世界股份有限公司
- Romanized name: Wánměi shìjiè gǔfèn yǒuxiàn gōngsī
- Type: Public
- Traded as: SZSE: 002624
- ISIN: CNE1000018W6
- Industry: Video games
- Founded: 2004; 22 years ago
- Founder: Chi Yufeng
- Headquarters: Beijing, China
- Key people: Chi Yufeng (chairman); Robert Xiao (CEO)
- Owner: Perfect World Investment & Holding Group (controlling interest)
- Number of employees: 4,500 (2013)
- Website: pwrd.com

Perfect World Co., Ltd. (Chinese: 完美世界股份有限公司) is a Chinese mass media company based in Beijing. It was founded in 2004 by Chi Yufeng. The company consists of two business segments: Perfect World Games, a video game publisher, and Perfect World Pictures, a film production company.

Perfect World is the exclusive distributor of Valve's games Dota 2 and Counter-Strike 2 in China.

== History ==
Perfect World was founded in 2004 by Chi Yufeng. A 1994 graduate of Tsinghua University, Chi had founded Beijing Hongen Education and Technology in 1996, which sold educational software to teach Chinese consumers how to use personal computers and learn English. He established Perfect World, then also known as Perfect World Games, as a developer and publisher of online multiplayer video games. The company became listed on the Nasdaq stock exchange in 2007. In 2008, Chi founded the film production company Perfect World Pictures. After Perfect World Games was delisted from Nasdaq in 2015, it was merged with Perfect World Pictures, which was traded on the Shenzhen Stock Exchange, in 2016. The combined company was renamed Perfect World. Perfect World Investment & Holding Group (Chinese: 完美世界控股集团有限公司), a holding company founded by Chi on 14 August 2013, owns a controlling interest in Perfect World.

Perfect World bought the developer Cryptic Studios from Atari, SA in May 2011 for ¥341,157,500 (€35 million). The transaction was completed by August that year.

Perfect World Entertainment was Perfect World's North American video game subsidiary. It was established in June 2008.

In December 2021, Perfect World sold Perfect World Entertainment and Cryptic Studios to Embracer Group. In June 2024, Perfect World reportedly laid off over 1,000 employees.

== Subsidiaries ==
=== Perfect World Europe ===
Perfect World Europe B.V. is Perfect World's European video game subsidiary. It was established in early 2010 in Amsterdam. Gabriel Hacker was appointed as Perfect World Europe's general manager in May 2012. In early 2020, a large portion of the company's staff was laid off, leaving only the finance, customer support, and localisation departments. The subsidiary formerly owned Perfect World Entertainment, the publishing arm of the company which was sold to Embracer Group in 2021.

=== Hotta Studio ===
Developer of Tower of Fantasy and Neverness to Everness.

=== Black Wings Game Studio ===
Developer of Persona 5: The Phantom X

=== Runic Games ===
Runic Games was a developer founded in 2008 and based in Seattle. Perfect World acquired a controlling interest in the studio in May 2010 for US$8.4 million. On 3 November 2017, Perfect World shut down Runic Games, citing the publisher's focus on games as a service.

== Collaborations with Valve ==
On 25 February 2016, Perfect World hosted Dota 2's Shanghai Major. While the tournament itself was well received in regards to the player performances, the event garnered criticism due to delays on stream, spotty broadcasts, and various other problems within the tournament, including the theft and deterioration of the competing teams' equipment. In the month that followed the event, the president of Perfect World, Yunfan Zhang, apologised for the issues with the event.

In June 2018, Perfect World and Valve announced that they were developing a version of Valve's Steam service for the Chinese market.

On 13 November 2023, it was announced that Perfect World would be hosting the second Valve-sponsored Counter-Strike 2 Major Championship in Shanghai, China, with the event scheduled for 30 November 2024.

== Games developed ==
Year	Title	Platform(s)	Ref.
2006	Perfect World	Windows	
2006	Legend of Martial Arts		
2007	Jade Dynasty		
2008	Chi Bi		
2008	Hot Dance Party		
2008	Ether Saga Odyssey		
2009	Battle of the Immortals		
2009	Fantasy Zhu Xian		
2010	Dragon Excalibur		
2010	Forsaken World		
2013	Saint Seiya Online	Windows	
2014	Swordsman Online		
2017	Final Fantasy Awakening		
2022	Tower of Fantasy		
2024	Persona 5: The Phantom X	Android, iOS, Windows	
2024	One-Punch Man: World		
2026	Neverness to Everness	Android, iOS, HarmonyOS, Windows, macOS, PlayStation 5	
