= Battle of the Immortals =

2010 video game

- Developer(s): Beijing Perfect World
- Publisher(s): TR: Joygame; CN: Beijing Perfect World; NA: Perfect World Entertainment; SK: Nexon; VN: Vinagame
- Designer(s): Liao (Fruit) Shuiguo
- Platform(s): Windows
- Release: May 4, 2010
- Genre(s): MMORPG
- Mode(s): MMO

Battle of the Immortals was a free-to-play massively multiplayer online role-playing game (MMORPG) by Perfect World Entertainment. Beta began on April 14, 2010, and is open to all users with a Perfect World account. On April 30, 2010, the closed beta ended and the open beta began on May 4, 2010. The Guardians of Fate was released on February 22, 2012. Battle of the Immortals takes place in Western Europe, where the player takes the role of a hero to help revive Odin. Besides, Battle of the Immortals is published by Joygame in Turkey since July, 2012. The closed Beta started on September 18, ended on October 11. The open beta which started on October 25 is still on. The game closed all its servers on January 8, 2018.

The central gameplay consists of completing quests by NPCs (non-player characters) and hunting monsters to gain experience, which can level a player up and obtain and use better gear in the game. The game is free to download and play, with an optional in-game cash shop that can be used to purchase items to help assist the player in leveling faster or getting better gear.

== Gameplay ==
Battle of the Immortals features an expansive pet system, a mount upgrade system, and six playable classes. In the new Guardians of Realms update there were the new systems introduced: Fate Cards and Exaltation.

== Quests ==
There are various quests in the game. Players are given experience and coins and in some cases items from these quests. These items can be armour, weapons, potions and other materials. The more quests that are completed the quicker a character will level up. Several Battle of the Immortals encounters and zones are based on player vs player combat. there are also sub divisions of quests which can be separated into different parts. some of them being branch, scenario, within the day, instance, and such. doing scenario quests will unlock different chapters which make up the foundation of the game, also the rewards from the scenario quests tend to be greater than that from an average quest.

== Gear and equipment ==
Armor and weapons can be collected as drops from monsters ingame, as well as being purchased from other players who sell their wares. Each of the five classes have different abilities, so picking the right equipment is essential (a spellcaster will be considerably weakened by using a blade, and the same applies to melee fighters who use a staff.)

The game also features "Soul Gear", which has stats that are more powerful than any other gear at that level. Soul Gear is the best gear in the game to date, and when more than one piece of gear is equipped at one time it provides additional bonuses (more hp/mp, attack power, etc. to help your class). The soul gear system in the game allows for the user to purchase an item that will upgrade the soul gear as it is to the next level gear, allowing transfer of almost all stats (blessing and soul insignias excluded). This helps the player avoid expensive costs of having to remove all the stats in their previous gear and having to redo every piece of armor each time they hit a level gap.

Soul gear is obtained by either doing instanced events (level 45 gear in Dragon Emperor, level 60 gear at Specter Island, level 75 at Giza Temple, 90 at Lava Heights, and 100 Doing Pit of Reckoning. In the recently released 'Titan Update', the new level 115 soul gear is obtain by doing the Titan's Trial.) Primal Gear is also newly introduced, giving soul gear-like properties with additional combat-related benefits (more damage per attack or higher defense.)

In addition to the Soul Gear system, Battle of the Immortals has extensive weapon and armor upgrade systems which includes Fortification, Gem Embedding, Stardust and Starwords Combination, Gear Blessing, and Soul Insignia Charm. Lastly, the armors can be enhanced with "glow effects" in game.

== Pet system ==
The game features a pet system. Pets can be caught by fighting monsters or using items from the Cash Shop and buying them from an in-game merchant. Pets like players have 5 stats. Pet can have up to 6 skills. And another 6 exalted skills, once the pet's fortification level is above 10. Pets can be melded which result in higher generation pet, the highest being Generation 3. They can also be boosted which increases their growth. Growth is used to determine how many HP and MP they gain from their stats.

As of the new Guardians of Fate update pets also have 4 types of gear.

Items included in the cash shop can either be used as cosmetic (used to change the look of your avatar), upgrades (gems to help improve your gear or pets), and functionality (warcries, which can shout to everyone who is logged into the game server at the time).

== Fate cards ==
Fate cards are fairly new system, so some mechanics are locked. However it mostly consists of participating in events, or killing monsters in order to acquire them but also increasing your fate energy which determines how much fate cards you can equip. Fate cards are used to boost stats, but some also cut down other stats. They are divided in 3 ways: Type, Grade and Energy
