= Empire of Sports =

- Developer(s): F4
- Publisher(s): F4 Group
- Platform(s): Microsoft Windows
- Genre(s): Sports MMORPG
- Mode(s): Multiplayer

Empire of Sports was an online multiple-sport MMORPG developed by the French company F4, that advertised itself as the first ever of that style. It was first demo-ed at the Leipzig Games Convention in August 2007 and was afterwards in a so-called Prologue phase which objectives were similar to a beta testing. It was downloadable and playable free of charge, although one could spend money on optional items in the title. In April 2016 the game was shut down permanently.

== Gameplay ==
Empire of Sports combined role-play and competitive sports games in a persistent world. The player controlled a single character, or avatar, which they played with through the game. This was capable of increasing in ability with playing.

The following sports were available for competitive play (friendly and official mode): football, tennis, skiing, basketball, bobsleigh and track & field. There were also a series of training/fitness games. There were plans for this list to be expanded post-launch.

Players were able to compete against AI (artificial intelligence) controlled characters or other players. For team sports they could team up with AI or other players as well. Players were able to form their own teams and clubs, and tournaments and competitions were organized.

== Critical reception ==
Eurogamer examined the Empire of Sports preview and found it prone to bugs, with a sluggish interface and unfinished NPCs and shops. However, the sports events themselves were considered slick and playable.
