= Eden Eternal =

2010 video game

- The logo for Eden Eternal
- Developer: X-Legend
- Publisher: Aeria Games
- Engine: Gamebryo
- Platform: Microsoft Windows
- Release: TW: 28 October 2010; CHN: November 2010; HK: November 2010; JP: January 2011; WW: 16 June 2011; (Open Beta)
- Genre: Massively multiplayer online role-playing game

Eden Eternal, also known as Finding Neverland Online (Chinese: 聖境傳說; pinyin: Shèng Jìng Chuánshuō, or Chinese: 梦之传说; pinyin: Mèng Zhī Chuánshuō in Hong Kong), or Eternal Atlas (エターナル・アトラス, Etānaru Atorasu)—The Refined FNO in Japan, was a free-to-play, anime-styled massively multiplayer online role-playing game developed by X-Legend and published internationally in Western European languages by Aeria Games. The Open Beta was released on 15 June 2011.

Critics praise its gameplay, visuals, game systems and innovative guild system but heavily criticized its conventional item mall, story and leveling.

Eden Eternal announced it was stopping registration of new accounts in February 2021, and that the service would entirely cease on April 29, 2021.

== Gameplay ==
=== Races ===
There are five races: Human, Ursun, Halfkin, Anuran, and Zumi.

Halfkins are notable for appearing just like human children, except they're another species of human who never physically age past looking like children. Hence, this makes Eden Eternal one of the few MMORPGs out there today that includes child characters.

=== Class System ===
The game features a plethora of unlockable classes which include:

Melee DPS	Ranged DPS	Magic DPS	Defense	Support	Other
Thief	Hunter	Magician	Warrior	Cleric	Mimic
Martial Artist	Engineer	Illusionist	Knight	Bard	
Blade Dancer	Ranger	Warlock	Templar	Shaman	
Samurai	Inquisitor	Luminary	Dragon Knight	Sage	

As a player trains each class, they will be able to level up both their characters levels and class levels. Gaining character levels unlocks branch skills, techniques that work among all classes under the same branch as indicated by color: yellow, orange, green, blue, and purple representing Defense, Melee DPS, Range DPS, Support/Healing, and Magic DPS branches respectively. These branch skills come at level 1 and can be leveled using the game's monetary currency until equal to the player's current character level. Class experience points and class points (CP) are gained only for the current class being used, so classes may level independently of character level, though a class level may not surpass the player's current character level. If a class has gained 100% of the class experience it needs to level but is inhibited by character level, then it will increase upon any gain of class experience once the character level has increased first. As class level increases, class specific skills are unlocked in increments of 5 levels until level 30 where skills are unlocked in increments of 10 levels, thereafter, until level 60. Class points are used to level these class specific skills and are typically gained in a 1:1 ratio with the class experience, but class points will continue to increase once class level ceases to increase and no class experience is gained. Each class has its own pool of class points independent of other classes. The only exception to class points not being gained in an equal amount to class experience gain is when a daily recommended event is completed; at this time, class experience is awarded but no class points are gained.

In addition, leveling classes unlocks certificates which provide passive boosts when assigned to a class. All certificates unlocked are available for every class to use independently of those assigned to other classes. At levels 10, 20, and 30, a class will unlock new certificates while leveling the same class to levels 40, 50, and 60 will replace an older certificate with an augmented version with the same type of effect in the same order they were acquired. The number of certificates that can be used at any one time depends on character level - an initial two certificate slots can be used at level 10 and an additional slot is unlocked every 10 levels until level 60 where all seven are available. Using certificates in certain arrangements and combinations (only with certificates from the same branch) may trigger up to two more passive boosts or effects that influence the power of specific skills.

Players can switch between any unlocked classes at any time outside of combat throughout the game starting from level 5. Beginning with Warrior and Magician as the initial unlocked classes, a player must gain both specific character levels along with class levels to unlock each of the alternative classes starting at character level 5, subsequently unlocking one new class every 5 levels except for when two classes become available each at levels 60 (Templar and Samurai) and 70 (Sage and Dragoon). No class requirements are imposed when unlocking classes up to character level 20 (Cleric, Hunter, Thief, and Bard). Thereafter, a class can be unlocked reaching the required character level and by training its required class or classes to a specified level until level 65 (Engineer, Illusionist, Martial Artist, Shaman, Blade Dancer, Warlock, Templar, Samurai, and Ranger). Sage and Dragoon are unique in that they have no class requirements, but can only be unlocked by completing a special quest line. Sage acquires its quest line at level 69 but the final task cannot be completed until level 70.

The players' clothing depends on the class they are currently using; although all classes have different unlockable outfits depending on their class levels (Usually in increments of 10). There is a dye system featuring regular and rare exotic dyes, which can be used to color these outfits. New players can receive dyes from shops, and quests as they pass through the game. (There are random dyes, which contain 4 colors and are picked at random for the portion of the outfit chosen) The dye store does not include rarer colors, and "Beginner" dyes cannot be used after reaching level 15. It also includes a title system based on in-game achievements, some of these have perks associated with them as long as a player has the title set. Legendary Achievements are listed as special titles, but do not need to be set to use the passive boosts and are all simultaneously active.

=== Storyline ===
The player has been found trapped inside of a blue crystal and has no memory of anything that has happened to them before being found. Throughout the game, this person, also known as a "Crystal Child", will try to look for clues about what has happened to them and the recent troubles that have been appearing around populated areas.

The game's unofficial mascot is the Grass Mud Horse, (alpaca in the English version), which in-game, is a popular mount and method of transport.

=== Guilds ===
Players in Eden Eternal may found guilds for 50 gold coins in the city of Aven (the biggest city on the main continent). A guild starts at level 1 and can be leveled with increasing amounts of gold donated by members or earned by the guild through taxes and fame accumulated through player actions such as completing special quests or using buildings in one's own guild's town. These player actions contribute to personal guild fame and to an overall guild fame that is the sum of all members' guild fame. If a player is evicted from or leaves a guild, his or her guild fame is reset to 0 though the overall guild fame remains unchanged. Each guild can build their own town starting at level 3, containing up to five unique buildings, which can be upgraded in accordance to guild level. These towns contain a guild vault that grows larger when the guild level increases. At certain levels, statues of players can be constructed in the central part of a guild town with permission of the guild leader and 500 gold from the guild funds. The number of players that can be part of a guild increases with guild level.

Territory Wars are large-scale player versus player (PvP) events where guilds compete to take control of different maps by capturing large crystals on a single battlefield and defeating players from other guilds for 30 minutes. A guild can control up to three territories and players who participated (must be level 30+ and have contributed 200 fame to the guid) gain one War Chest for each crystal captured by their guild which contain between 1-100 War Stones. These War Stones can be used to craft certain accessories or can be traded for other prizes in increments of 10. During a Territory War, players can complete special quests which involve communicating with specific non-player characters (NPC) on the battlefield map and traveling to certain areas finally to be turned in at Aven for a reward of several more War Chests. When talking to a certain NPC in a map their guild controls, players can acquire a salary and additional War Chests once a day that corresponds to their character level and the number of territories owned by their guild overall. When defeating monsters within a territory controlled by one's guild, bonus experience is awarded. Another way to acquire War Stones is to accept a daily quest from an NPC in Aven and participate in 3v3 Arena matches where players of similar levels are randomly pitted against one another in teams of three and Monster Battle Arenas which are similar but involve each player transforming into a monster reminiscent of bosses found in the game.

Guild Elimination matches are held on weekends and allow guilds that have accumulated a large amount of fame during the week to participate in a tournament style series of guild versus guild battles staged in a closed arena. There is a crystal capture system similar to that of Territory Wars and also have a time limit of 30 minutes, but only two guilds participate at a time in each arena (though multiple matches may occur at the same time in different instances). However, Guild Elimination matches can be ended earlier if one guild captures and keeps control of enough crystals simultaneously while defeating players from the enemy guild. The amount one guild is overwhelming or is overwhelmed by the other guild in this fashion is tracked through a morale gauge of split colors (representing one's own guild's and the opposing guild's morale levels), and the battle ends if one guild has lost enough morale. The top three guilds in this competition are rewarded a number of prize bags containing random items corresponding to their ranking are given to guild leaders to be distributed among members of their guilds. In addition, the members of these winning guilds receive a floating crown icon in gold, silver, or bronze and stat boosts of 3%, 2%, and 1% respectively to core stats depending on ranking for the week. These boosts are removed when next weekend's Guild Elimination begins anew.

== Reception ==
An early reviewer for ggFTW praised Eden Eternal's class system as "unique and interesting". A DotMMO review of the game during beta testing called it "a solid MMO."
