= Atriarch =

- Developer: World Fusion
- Designer: Serafina Pechan
- Platform: Windows
- Release: Cancelled

Atriarch is an unreleased sci-fi massively multiplayer online role-playing game (MMORPG) that was in development by World Fusion.

== Gameplay ==
The game takes place on Ariana, a living alien world where every element—creatures, structures, weapons, and objects—exists as an organic lifeform to some degree. The player explores one of the planet's six continents, navigating environments that, while alien in appearance, function in familiar ways; buildings resemble buildings, dangerous objects appear sharp, and large creatures signal their toughness through their size and form. The player's Tyrusin character begins in a valley containing windmills, small structures, and a spiked fortress surrounding a deep central pit. Items found in the world appear exactly as they are—swords look like swords, spears like spears—even when lying on the ground, rather than appearing as generic containers or icons. Approaching the pit reveals a platform suspended over a seemingly bottomless drop, held aloft not by ropes but by the extended tongues of massive creatures, consistent with the world's fully organic design.

== Development ==
Atriarch was in development by World Fusion, a company located in Costa Mesa, California.By 1999, Atriarch was in development for two years. Around eight people were working on it.

Atriarch was announced in May 1999. World Fusion showcased Atriarch at the 2000 Game Developers Conference.
