= Fighting Legends Online =

2001 video game

- Developer: Maximum Charisma Studios
- Publisher: Maximum Charisma Studios
- Platform: Windows
- Release: November 2001
- Genre: Massively multiplayer online role-playing game

Fighting Legends Online is a 2001 video game from Maximum Charisma Studios. It was formerly known as Project TROG.

== Gameplay ==
Fighting Legends Online is a massively multiplayer online game set in the world of Exisle, where players assume control of an immortal squad leader called an Avatar. After customizing the Avatar's traits—like health, damage, and speed—the player enters a faction-divided world shaped by a sci-fi-fantasy backstory involving a crashed ship and frozen alien specimens. Gameplay centers on strategic base management rather than traditional role-playing. This base handles everything from resource mining to squad creation, but its limited range forces frequent relocation. Combat is simple and console-like: target enemies, switch mood from passive to aggressive, and click to attack. The recharge system adds rhythm, and squad control is intuitive, allowing players to divide units and assign formations using keyboard macros.

== Development ==
Fighting Legends Online was announced in December 2000. It was developed by Maximum Charisma Studios, a company founded in November 1999.

== Reception ==
Reception

Review scores
Publication	Score
All Game Guide	2/5
Games Domain	2.5/5
GameSpy	63%
GameSpot	4/10
IGN	6.5/10

IGN gave Fighting Legends Online a score of 6.5 out of 10 stating "Overall, neither Fighting Legends' unique features nor its innovative world are significant enough to alter the fact that the game is just a bland, simplistic alternative to other prominent MMOGs".
