= Xsyon =

2011 video game

- Developer: Notorious Games
- Publisher: Notorious Games
- Producer: Jordi Grau Davis
- Designer: Jordi Grau Davis
- Programmers: Jordi Grau Davis; Ilia Novikov; Nikolay Hundentsov
- Artists: Aleksey Egoshin; Dmitriy Chernov; Evgeniy Myasnikov; Ilia Pantyhov; Yuri Vinokurov; Katya Andreeva
- Composer: Maurici Grau Ribes
- Platform: Microsoft Windows
- Release: WW: 15 March 2011
- Genre: MMORPG
- Mode: Multiplayer

Xsyon is a sandbox massively multiplayer online role-playing game developed by the independent company, Notorious Games. Xsyon is set in an apocalyptic fantasy environment, closely modeled on the real world area of Lake Tahoe which spans the California and Nevada border, west of Carson City using US Geological Survey data. Xsyon is a persistent world crafting sandbox game. It has been designed to have a completely player-driven economy and player-created questing system. This is unusual among MMORPGs, which often rely upon non-player character vendors and quest givers to perform these functions. Xsyon can be found on many sandbox MMORPG game lists. The game world is currently both Player versus Environment (PvE) and open Player versus Player (PvP), with players being safe from other players only in the starter area (Founder's Isle) and on their own tribe land.

== Development ==
Xsyon entered a pre-release phase in March 2010. The official 'Prelude' phase launched in the following year. A third, fully featured phase 'Xsyon: Apocalypse' was planned. In November 2012, a Kickstarter campaign was launched to raise funds to pay for faster development of the game. The game runs a premium subscription model to access all content.

In January 2013, Xsyon entered the Steam Greenlight program, the entry program for games that eventually launch on Steam. That September, Xsyon reached the top 100 of over 1300 games in the Steam Greenlight program. Xsyon was officially released on Steam as an Early Access game in December 2014.

== Setting ==
Xsyon provides an alternate reality fantasy setting in an apocalyptic environment.

Set in the near future, Xsyon is an apocalyptic fable, drawing its inspiration from Native American history, mythology, and prophecies of the Apocalypse. Most aspects of modern life are gone. The leaders of the new world, under the guidance of the once forgotten gods, have hidden traces of the scientific progress that led to the devastation of the earth. Modern vehicles, weapons, appliances, computers and even the books that describe these things are practically nowhere to be found. The landscape of the Lake Tahoe basin provides a wilderness setting with few traces of modern civilization as a clean slate for the first settlers of Xsyon to construct their world.

The society of the past, primarily the Washoe Indians and the early pioneers live once more juxtaposed with the remnants of modern society.

Players role-play as 'Survivors', who have woken up after the Apocalypse, having forgotten all technology they knew before, and begin trying to make sense of their new surroundings.

As an explorer and settler of this new world players have many choices. They can specialize their skills or become a jack-of-all-trades. They can play as part of a tribe, socially involved with many other players, or can explore the world as a lone adventurer.

== Features ==
The in-game world has a dynamic environment which features a realistic day-night cycle, seasonal changes and weather conditions including snow and rain.

The environment is influenced and managed by players. Natural resources in the world are affected by the actions of players. They can be harvested to extinction or preserved. Trees age, grow and can be planted and chopped down. Animals age, breed, mutate and migrate to balance their population. Xsyon features a terraforming system which allows players to sculpt the land and prepare foundations for roads and structures. Towns and buildings are player-designed and created.

Xsyon is a social game relying on a tribal political system and player-run economy.

Combat is twitch-based, featuring manually controlled left and right attacking and parrying and charged attacks.

=== Playable area ===
The Map is divided into a number of zones in a grid, with the starter area on an island in the lake, slightly north of the center of the map. The edge of the playable world is surrounded by a toxic green mist, which will kill players which venture too far into it, and causes animals to mutate. The zones have varying Danger Levels depending on the types and amount of hostile creatures in the zone. The Danger level generally increases as the player moves away from the center of the map towards the mist.

Players claim protected areas of land by forming a tribe and placing a totem.

=== Tribes ===
In order to claim land upon which to settle and build, players must form a tribe and place a totem.

There are four categories of tribe in Xsyon, determined by the number of tribe members. A 'homestead' has up to 4 members, a 'band' has 5 to 9 members, a 'clan' has between 10 and 19 members, and a 'tribe' has more than 20 members.

A tribe's land is square, with the totem at the center. Which each new member, the radius of the tribe land increases, up to a maximum of 197 metres. As a tribe's size increases, the expanse gained per member decreases incrementally as the number of members grows. Depending on the category of tribe, an area of land is also reserved which will prevent other tribes from expanding into that area. A tribe cannot expand its area into another tribe's land. If expanse is blocked by another tribe, an increase in tribe area gained by adding new members will not be awarded until the neighboring totem is removed.

If a tribe has no active members, the totem will begin to decay through various stages. Revenants spawn at totems beyond the deserted stage, haunt abandoned towns, guard ruins and are hostile NPCs that can loot and equip weapons and armor from players they kill. If players can defeat the revenants haunting a totem, they can loot the items left behind by previous players. Tribe leaders have a large degree of control over their own tribe land, can create and assign ranks, and set permission as to what accesses and actions they will allow individual members to perform on tribe land, such as planting trees or gathering resources. Players from outside a tribe cannot perform certain actions on a tribe's land, and a player cannot be attacked by another player on their own tribe land, but the players from outside a tribe, are able to be attacked by tribe members whilst on that tribe's own land. If a player dies, they will respawn at their own Tribe Totem.

=== Quests ===
Players can create Quests, listed on tribal totems for other players to perform. These can be used as a way of trading for items whilst players are offline. Three different types of quests are available: Collect, Hunt and Craft. As well as providing an exchange of goods, the quests also generate 'Experience Points' for both parties. The amount of experience gained depends upon the quantity and rarity of quest goals and difficulty of travel in order to attain and complete the quest.

=== Events ===
Xsyon is supported by a team of 'Guides' that assists players and run regular weekend events. Events involve players in a range of contests and activities including PvP tournaments, scavenger hunts, obstacle courses and fashion shows.

== Accolades ==
In March 2011, Xsyon was chosen as the featured game in Massively's 'Choose My Adventure' series. The following month, Xsyon was the subject of Massively's 'Community Detective Issue'. In January 2013, Xsyon was voted as the #2 Best P2P MMO on MMOSite's Reader's Choice contest. In January 2015, Xsyon was voted as the #3 Best Sandbox MMO of 2014 on MMOGames.
