= Manga Fighter =

2007 video game

Manga Fighter (Offline)
- Developer: OnNet (Korea)
- Publishers: OnNet (USA), GamesCampus, Realfogs (Germany and the Netherlands)
- Platform: Microsoft Windows
- Release: NA: December 3, 2007
- Genres: Action, MMO Third-person shooter
- Modes: Single-player, Co-operative

Manga Fighter was a multiplayer online third-person shooter developed by OnNet and hosted by game portal GamesCampus, for Microsoft Windows-based PCs. Players will join other combatants in a 3D manga-style world, with multiple modes of combat and a variety of character customization options. The game first began its open beta on July 31, 2007, and was released to the public on December 3, 2007. The game was shut down on July 30, 2010. Before that happened, GamesCampus held a series of events to commemorate the 3 years of service. A Dutch version of the game remained in operation until June 2013 under the name QPang.

== Characters ==
Players can choose from and switch between the six characters at any time. Each character has their own strengths and weaknesses.

- Ken: A young; mischievous boy who gets into trouble quite often. He is the troublemaker so to say.
- Hana: Hana is Ken's good friend and is always fun to be around.
- Kuma: Despite his size and fierce look, Kuma the bear is very kind and has a noble spirit. Kuma is a friend of Miu Miu.
- Miu Miu: This fast and agile cat has a great sense of fashion, good fighting skills and is pretty mysterious.
- Dr. Uru: Dr. Uru is an explorer and also a robotic alien that gets into a lot of trouble.
- Sai: Sai is a friend of Dr. Uru and an alien too. He is shy and tend to be the most cautious of the two aliens.

== Match Modes ==
There are six modes of gameplay which is chosen by the room master, namely Death Match, Team Death Match, Protect Essence, Tag Play, VIP Mode, and Practice Mode.
Two players are required to start Team/Death Match and four players are required to start Essence/VIP. There are no player requirements to start Practice.
In protect essence mode, the player has to protect a purple diamond shaped object called an "Essence" for the longest time, in VIP mode, the aim is to kill the "VIP" who will be assigned to be one randomly, in Tag Play one player is randomly selected to become "Battery Man" while the rest of the player have to kill him, then there is practice mode which serves as a training ground for beginners, and no experience is gained.

== Maps ==
A variety of entertaining and challenging maps are created to reflect the Japanese style of anime and especially the manga category. Each map is independent from the others in style and function. A player may choose to be in a map inspired by the real-world Thames River in London for one game, and then switch over to one that's a larger than life recreation of a detailed dollhouse. The current maps are: Moon, Garden, City Front, Diorama, Doll House, Flying Castle, Ossyria, Ground Zero, Temple of Fear, and Bridge. Games Campus even considered making a jungle map which was inspired by some members on the forums.

== Skills ==
Skill Cards can be obtained from the CardShop or inside a game. Every player will have four card slots when they are in a game. Skills can be used when the Skill Gauge reaches a certain level. The skill Gauge is filled when the player inflicts or takes damage. Skills grant special abilities to a player temporarily, such as becoming invisible or transforming into a powerful being. Skill cards can be enabled or disabled in specific game rooms.

== GM Events ==
Occasionally, there are GM events. These are events where players can obtain rare or good items (sometimes even CC) from a game master (GM). Players are notified 10 minutes before an event starts. The GM will create a room and announce the password so the fastest players can enter. Usually the event is just a normal match, but could also be a set of tournaments.

== Campus credits ==
CC otherwise known as Campus Credits is the game currency. Whenever you buy an item or a weapon, you can use CC. CC could be brought from their official website or win in a GM Event.

== Private Server ==
As of September 2020, a private server of the game has been launched and players can enjoy the game again like it was 2012. But only a few months after QpangIO was released Deluze randomly decided to delete the server as well as the Discord server. Their hard work has been open-sourced on GitHub which motivated new teams to start working on a new game server.

- QFighter is forked off QPang.IO and focuses on a free-to-play game while giving it a little twist by adding custom weapon skins. After November 2023 they stopped due the lack of players and funding.
- AnimeShooter is another free-to-play server that started around the same time of QFighter, and is committed to providing a long lasting service that replicates the original game.
- QPangEU is forked off QFigther, and was launched in the start of 2025 but failed a couple of months later. It was plagued with instability issues and failed to receive proper funding to keep the servers going.
