= Echo of Soul =

2013 video game

- Developer: Nvius
- Publishers: papaya play (NA)(EU); NHN Entertainment (KR); Changyou.com (CN)
- Engine: Unreal Engine
- Platform: Windows
- Release: SK: September 11, 2013; CH: October 31, 2014; EU: May 28, 2015; NA: May 28, 2015
- Genre: Massively multiplayer online role-playing game

Echo of Soul is a massively multiplayer online role-playing game developed by Korean game developer Nvius and published in North America and Europe by Aeria Games.

Open beta began in South Korea on September 11, 2013, in China on October 31, 2014, and in Western territories on May 28, 2015.

Echo of Soul shut down in South Korea on October 22, 2015. Nearly a year later, publisher Kakao Games relaunched Echo of Soul in South Korea.

== Gameplay ==
Echo of Soul is a free-to-play fantasy MMORPG. Players take control of adventurers, called Soulkeepers, who are tasked by the gods of the world to combat evil. Players have the unique ability to collect souls from the monsters they kill, which they can then use to customize their character.

The game has a wide array of both PvE and PvP modes. For example, PvE includes solo dungeons, party dungeons, and raids. PvP content includes 5 vs. 5 and 15 vs. 15 battles, as well as guild vs. guild combat in both the open world and a separate instanced battlefield. PvP is available at level 10, so players are able to reap the benefits of this feature early on in the game.

=== Soul system ===
Souls are collected after defeating opponents in combat and can be collected from both solo challenges or multiplayer activities. As the Soul comes from a corrupted source, it must be purified from one of the Soul Sanctums or with another player for it to be transformed into a beneficial source of power for the quest. Four Soul skills are available: Hope, Innocence, Courage and Peace. Each of them gives the player the ability to trigger a powerful buff during battle.

The combat system in Echo of Soul does not follow the standard "trinity" in MMOs consisting of tanks, healers, and DPS classes. Players can choose to tank or DPS; there are no dedicated healers. Healing is a group responsibility and strategic party play is critical to success.

=== Game classes ===
There are seven classes in the game: Warrior, Guardian, Archer, Rogue, Sorceress, Warlock and Templar. There are also player professions such as Jeweler, Resource Collector and Alchemist.

=== Jewels and runes ===
Jewels are used to enhance weapons and armor. There are seven types of Jewels, each relating to a different type of equipment.

== Plot ==
The story begins with a war between the two creators: The Gods and Giants. The Gods win the war, but the corrupted blood of Ymir the Giant King spread and threatened to contaminate the World Tree, the source of all creation. The Gods attempted to purify the world from the malicious spirit, but were unable to. The player must become the 'Soulkeeper' of the Gods and protect the world from harm.

== Development and release ==
On 19 March 2020, Blue Potion Games took over the publishing duties from Kakao Games and self-published it.

== Reception ==
Echo of Soul has won the "Best MMORPG 2014" award at the Thailand Game Show Festival.

== Sequels ==
On 28 August 2019, a sequel titled EOS Red was launched for Android. EOS Red takes place 50 years after the events of the original game. On 20 June 2024, another sequel titled EOS Black was released by Blue Potion Games.

In 2025, Blue Potion Games announced a sequel MMORPG developed with Unreal Engine 5.
