= Ether Saga Odyssey =

2008 video game

- Developer: Beijing Perfect World
- Publishers: (China) Perfect World Entertainment (Taiwan) Gameastor
- Platform: Windows
- Release: CN: June 26, 2008; NA: July 1, 2009 - 2016; TW: August 26, 2009
- Genre: Fantasy MMORPG
- Mode: MMOG

Ether Saga Odyssey (commonly abbreviated as ESO), was a free-to-play MMORPG developed by Perfect World. The International version was released worldwide in an English-language format. Ether Saga launched its closed beta February 2, 2009. The open beta began on March 17, 2009. And was fully released on July 1, 2009. Arcgames shut down Ether Saga Odyssey on January 4, 2016.

Ether Saga Online is heavily based on the Chinese novel Journey to the West.

== Races ==
Ren is the archetypal human race. The Ren run most of the major cities. They have advanced technology, societies and political systems. Their influence extends far and wide. It is the Human task to collect fragments of the Divine Chalice which were scattered about the world when a clumsy official dropped it.

Shenzu is the Demigod race. These individuals keep mostly to themselves focusing on spiritual cultivation and reaching higher levels of consciousness. They have been instructed to capture a certain pig demon who is actually the reincarnation of a powerful yet unruly heavenly general.

Yaoh were once animals but through advanced spiritual cultivation they were acknowledged by Heaven and granted acceptance as powerful and worthy of respect. Yaoh communities are found in various parts of the land. Their goal is to find a Sacred Ark that was discovered missing during the Peach Yard Banquet. Without this vessel the sacred knowledge cannot be brought to the Middle Kingdom.

Mogui are descents of Dragons. They are dark skinned with horns who live in volcano like area called Zappah Altar, where they Worship their deity, the Zappah Dragon. Currently all Mogui players are set on a mission to advertise their existence and power to the other races, the world, and to the gods.

== Classes ==
Dragoon Considered as a Tank. Engages in battle using a spear and wears Guardian armor.

Rogue Considered as a damage dealer. Uses poison-tipped daggers and wears Scout armor.

Mystic is a healer, can cast Buffs. Uses a staff for battle and wears Arcane armor.

Ranger Considered a ranged damage dealer. Can cast debuffs on enemies. Wears Scout armor and fights with a bow.

Conjurer is an offensive spell-caster. Can cast positive buffs. Equips a type of weapon called 'invokens' and wears Arcane armor in battle.

Shaman is a healer with great debuffing abilities. Wears Guardian armor and fights with a hammer.

Maven is an offensive spell-caster with many bleeding curses. Wears Arcane armors and fight with a scepter

Hellion is an offensive melee class. Has a special system, rage system that means they get mana by being hit. They can sacrifice their own hp to get rage. Wears Guardian armor and fights with dual-axes

== Features ==
Pet System Ether Saga Online has an expansive pet system in which pets can be leveled, trained, evolved and combined with each other. All four races have a starter pet. The starter pets consist of:

- the Shenzu race get a Baby Matou Longtail
- the Yaoh race get a Baby Katsu Fox
- the Mogui get a Redmalkin Cub
- the Ren race get a Baby Dewdrop Bunny
