= NEStalgia =

2011 video game

- Title screen
- Developer: Silk Games
- Publisher: Silk Games
- Designer: Ben Mallahan
- Engine: BYOND
- Platform: Microsoft Windows
- Release: February 23, 2011; Steam: April 15, 2014
- Genre: Role-playing game
- Mode: Multiplayer

NEStalgia was a massively multiplayer online role-playing game for Microsoft Windows created by American indie developer Silk Games. NEStalgia was launched on February 23, 2011, then released for Steam on April 15, 2014. The core gameplay follows the classic Japanese role-playing game format (particularly Dragon Quest) with turn-based battles, random encounters, and explorable towns and dungeons.

== Gameplay ==
There are eight character classes in total. The focus of NEStalgia is a cooperative party system in which players join up to battle monsters and complete quests together.

In addition to the classic elements, the game has world chat, a guild system, Player versus player combat, rare items and gear to find, a quest log, and a player auction house for item trading.

== Development ==
The game was designed by Ben Mallahan, who has been creating online games using the BYOND game creation system since 2001. NEStalgia was in development for two years, which included an 11-month public beta period. The game was launched on February 23, 2011.

Since release, NEStalgia has undergone many changes. Notable changes include improved framerate, graphical and interface upgrades, and a "companion" system that allows solo players to recruit and fight alongside most monsters in the game. Although NEStalgia was developed and powered using BYOND, it became downloadable as a standalone game in June 2012.

NEStalgia was submitted to Steam Greenlight in August 2012. It was Greenlit on August 28, 2013, then launched on Steam on April 15, 2014.

The last update for the MMO was in September 2016. All official game servers have been offline since October 2018. The official forum has been offline since December 2019.
