= MonsterMMORPG =

2011 video game

- Developer: Furkan Gözükara
- Publisher: MonsterMMORPG
- Programmer: Furkan Gözükara
- Engine: ASP.NET
- Platforms: Browser game Android
- Release: WW: September 1, 2009
- Genre: MMORPG
- Mode: Multiplayer

MonsterMMORPG is a free-to-play browser-based indie massively multiplayer online role-playing game published in 2011.

== History ==
MonsterMMORPG was developed in 2009 by Furkan Gözükara as part of his computer engineering program. The game was published in 2011 and since then has been in continual development. The game is available on Google Play, Facebook, and as a standalone web application. The Android version is a wrapper that accesses the game's website.

== Gameplay ==
The concept and gameplay of MonsterMMORPG have been compared to Pokémon. Players control a team of monsters, which they can use to battle other wild monsters, typically to weaken and capture them. There are more than 2,000 monsters to collect, with a maximum of 6 monsters per team. Additional monsters are automatically added to the player's storage. An index of collected mosters feature makes organizing the group more simple. Each monster has a unique value in the game, allowing for difference within the monster type.

The game boasts over five hundred maps and hundreds of monster battle moves, as well as buildings which players can use to heal their monsters or buy and sell monsters and items. There is also a player versus player mode and results are displayed publicly.
