= Argentum Online =

RPG game

The game's logo

Argentum Online is a 1999 Argentine MMORPG video game, available on Microsoft Windows. The game is a modification of ORE v0.4 (developed by Baronsoft), made in 1999 by Pablo Ignacio Márquez (aka "Gulfas Morgolock") and Fernando Testa together with a group of friends in Argentina.

The game was the first MMORPG developed in Argentina. A sequel entitled Argentum 2 was at one point in development.

The developers and fans worked together to create variants and mods of the game, and by 2001 four different versions had been made.

The game's source code was released in 2003 under the GNU GPL license and can be downloaded from SourceForge.
