= Aeria Games =

German video game publisher

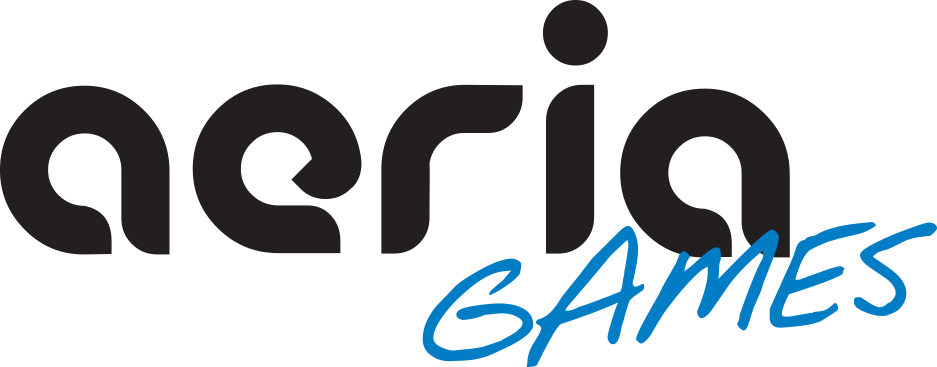
- Type: Subsidiary
- Industry: Video games
- Founded: 2006
- Defunct: 2023
- Headquarters: Berlin, Germany
- Key people: Remco Westermann (CEO)
- Parent: Gamigo

Aeria Games, formerly known as Aeria Games and Entertainment, was an online game publisher. The corporate headquarters were located Santa Clara, California, USA; and later, in Berlin, Germany.

Aeria Games was a privately owned organization by Aeria Games & Entertainment Inc, later a subsidiary of ProSiebenSat.1 Media, and later of Gamigo, which operated an Internet gaming portal for massively multiplayer online games. It focused on online games in multiple formats, client games, browser games, and mobile games. It published games for North America, South America and Europe. It closed down in 2023.

== History ==
Aeria Games was founded in Santa Clara, California, as Aeria Games & Entertainment. Two years later they opened their first international office in Berlin, Germany, which later became the company's headquarters. On January 5, 2012, the company acquired ijji, and later that year merged with Gamepot.

In February 2014, all its worldwide PC games business including its subsidiary Aeria Games Europe GmbH were sold to ProSiebenSat.1 Media. In May 2016, Aeria Games merged with Gamigo and let go 100 of their formerly 260 employees in Berlin.

Its games were free-to-play and used a micropayment system to generate revenue (in-game item malls and advertising).

=== Portal Closure ===
On December 20, 2022, Aeria Games announced the transfer of all its current games (Aura Kingdom, Grand Fantasia and Shaiya) to other publishers. The publishing company additionally released information that the Aeria Games portal would be closing down in February of 2023.

Gamigo, the parent company of Aeria Games, subsequently confirmed on February 22, 2023, that the Aeria Games portal would be closing down on February 28, 2023.

== Games ==
=== Client Games published ===
- Echo of Soul – Fantasy MMO RPG
- Ironsight – FPS – Developed by Wiple Games
- Twin Saga – Anime MMO RPG
- WolfTeam – Sci-Fi FPS

=== Browser games published (Aeria Browser) ===
- DDTank – Turn-based Action Game
- Wartune – Browser Based MMORTS/RPG

=== Mobile games published ===
- Goal 1 – Football Manager
- Heroes and Puzzles – Match 3 Mobile Game

=== Client games published via Aeria Ignite ===
- Digimon Masters – Anime MMORPG

=== Games no longer published by Aeria Games ===
- Aura Kingdom – Anime-themed MMORPG
- Age of Conan: Unchained – Fantasy MMORPG
- Alliance of Valiant Arms – Military FPS
- Armygeddon – Turn-Based Strategy
- Battlefield Heroes – Cartoon-styled TPS
- Battles and Monsters – Fantasy CCG RPG
- Bless – Fantasy MMORPG
- Call of Gods – Browser Based MMORTS
- Chaos Heroes Online – MOBA
- Command & Conquer: Tiberium Alliances – Browser Based MMORTS
- Crystal Saga – Browser Based RPG
- Dawn of Gods – Mobile Real Time Strategy
- DK Online – Fantasy MMORPG
- Dragomon Hunter – Anime MMORPG
- Dragon Sky – Fantasy RPG
- Drakensang Online – Action MMORPG
- Dreamlords – Strategy / Browser
- Dream of Mirror Online – Fantasy RPG
- Dynasty Warriors Online – Action MMORPG
- Eden Eternal – Anime-themed MMORPG
- Eden Eternal – Monster Arena – Fantasy RPG
- F.E.A.R. Online – Horror FPS
- Golden Age – Browser Based MMORTS
- Grand Fantasia – Anime-themed MMORPG
- GunZ: The Duel – Third Person Shooter
- Heroes of Gaia – Browser Based MMORTS
- Immortalis – Fantasy CCG RPG
- Kingdom Heroes – Fantasy RPG
- Kitsu Saga – Fantasy RPG
- Last Chaos – Fantasy RPG
- Latale – Fantasy RPG
- Level R -
- Lime Odyssey – Anime themed MMORPG
- Lord of Ages – History-based Based MMORTS
- Lord of Ultima – Browser Based MMORTS
- Luminary:Rise of GoonZu – Fantasy RPG
- Maestia – Fantasy MMORPG
- Magimon – Fantasy CCG RPG
- Metal Assault – Platform Shooter
- Ministry of War – History-based MMORTS
- Monster Paradise – Fantasy CCG RPG
- Need for Speed: World – Action Driving
- Perfect World – Fantasy MMORPG (Spanish Only)
- Pi Story – Fantasy RPG
- Pirate Galaxy – Sci-fi browser MMORPG
- Pirate Maidens – Pirate CCG RPG
- Project Torque – Action Driving
- Ragnarok Online 2 – Fantasy MMORPG
- Repulse (later republished as R.A.F.: Run and Fire on Steam Russia)- Sci-fi online FPS
- Runes of Magic – Fantasy MMORPG (Spanish, Portuguese, Turkish)
- S4 League – Anime FPS
- Scarlet Blade – Sci-Fi/Fantasy MMORPG
- Shaiya
- Shin Megami Tensei: Imagine – Fantasy RPG
- Soldier Front – MMOFPS Game (rebrand of Special Force)
- Soldier Front 2 – MMOFPS Game (rebrand of Special Force 2)
- Star Supremacy – Sci-fi browser MMORTS
- Stone Age 2 – Fantasy RPG
- Stronghold Kingdoms – Client Based MMORTS
- Tuff Tanks – Turned-Based Artillery Shooter
- Turf Battles – MMO PK (PVP)
- Twelve Sky – Martial Arts RPG
- Twelve Sky 2 – Martial Arts RPG
- Twin Saga - 2017
