= Aura Kingdom =

2013 video game

Aura Kingdom Online
- Developer: X-Legend
- Publisher: Aeria Games
- Engine: Gamebryo
- Platforms: Windows, Android
- Release: December 23, 2013 (CBT); January 6, 2014 (OBT); March 6, 2018 (Android version); July 2, 2025 (OBT)
- Genre: MMORPG
- Mode: Multiplayer

Aura Kingdom, also known as Fantasy Frontier Online (Chinese: 幻想神域) in Taiwan and Hong Kong and Innocent World in Japan, is a massively multiplayer online role-playing game made by the Taiwanese game developer X-Legend. In Japan, it was originally called Gensō Shin'iki (幻想神域; lit.: "Fantasy Sanctuary"). After a significant update, the name was changed to Gensō Shin'iki: Cross to Fate (幻想神域 ~ Cross to Fate ~).

Aura Kingdom was published by Aeria Games in January 2014. It is a free-to-play game that was announced on August 12, 2013 at Otakon 2013. Attendees at Otakon were given beta keys for the MMO.

== History ==
- August 1, 2013: Closed Beta testing begins.
- August 6, 2013: Character creation open to players before Open Beta testing.
- August 8, 2013: Open Beta) testing begins.
- September 13, 2013: X-LEGEND ENTERTAINMENT JAPAN announces acquisition of publishing rights; Japanese server scheduled to launch in fall 2013.
- October 17, 2013: Official launch announced, followed by release of v1.0 'Lord of The Sky Tower'.
- June 10, 2022: Chinese operator (Changyou) announces end of service; servers to close and player data deleted on August 13, 2022.
- February 13, 2023: X-Legend Entertainment officially announces takeover of North American operations; player data can be transferred to new servers.
- May 29, 2024: Hong Kong and Macau operator (Alta Multimedia) announces license agreement ends July 2024; servers to close July 31, 2024, ending nearly 11 years of operation.
- June 11, 2024: Mainland China operator (Chuangtian Interactive) announces official open beta without data wipe starting June 26, 2024, after data wipe testing.
- July 2, 2025: 'Aura Kingdom - Impact' global version officially launches, featuring collaboration with popular Taiwanese IP 'Lan Lan Cat' | Official Website

== Gameplay ==
The game begins by villagers asking the player to help with tasks around the village.

Players take on the role of Envoys of Gaia, who they are tasked with the mission to save Azuria, the fantasy world of Aura Kingdom, from Darkness. Players can choose sixteen classes to play from: Guardian, Ravager, Duelist, Gunslinger, Grenadier, Bard, Wizard, Sorcerer, Brawler, Ranger, Ronin, Reaper, Crusader, Ninja, Lancer, and Performer. Players can then choose one of the four starting pet Eidolons, with the opportunity of recruiting more as the game progresses.

Players can have spirits as companions that grow and evolve. These spirits are known as ‘Eidolons’ that retain memories of players' accomplishments, such as boss kills, and can be conversed with.

== Critical reception ==
Games in Asia rated the game 6.1/10, noting a strong storyline, well-done anime-style character designs and impressive graphics, but noted a lack of dungeons, repetitiveness, and unchallenging gameplay as weak points of the game.
