= Turf Battles =

- Developer: EonicGames
- Publisher: EonicGames
- Platform: Microsoft Windows
- Release: KOR: 2003 (official service); TWN: 2003 (official service); CHN: 2003 (official service); JPN: 2009 (official service); NA: 2010 (projected release of official)
- Genre: Fantasy MMORPG
- Mode: Multiplayer

Turf Battles, often referred to as TB, is a massively multiplayer online role-playing game (MMORPG). It is IMAZIC's first released game first introduced in 2002. Turf Battles takes place within the world of Fomalhaut, years after a major war. Originally published under HyperEngines LLC, the open beta was announced around September 2005. Due to many technical issues, the game ultimately failed, and Hyper Engines LLC closed its operations mid-2008, but due to popular player support, the title was picked up for the American audience by Aeria Games and Entertainment, who announced Turf Battles in December 2008. After three closed betas, Turf Battles has gone into a final Beta Stress Test, which moved into an open beta. Aeria Games closed down the Turf Battles servers in June 2010, citing several technical issues that continued during the development.

In 2014, Eonic Games, a MMORPG development company, re-released the title as a complete rebuild based on the original HyperEngine LLC system, including the Island PK system. The new release proceeded out of open beta and is currently undergoing what they call, "Seasons", by testing out new improvements, items, nerfs, etc. and implementing what was well received into the game; seasons last 3 months at a time and undergo roughly 1-month break in between seasons.

== Gameplay ==
=== Starting a character or a play session ===
As with other MMORPGs, players control a character avatar within a game world, exploring the landscape, fighting monsters, completing quests and interacting with NPCs or other players. In common with many other MMORPGs, Turf Battles does not require the player to pay for a subscription, but in-game items can be purchased with real-world money.

To enter the game, the player must select a realm (or server). Each realm acts as an individual copy of the game world. Servers are both Player versus player (PvP), where open combat among players is common, and Player versus environment (PvE), where the focus is on defeating monsters and completing quests. On a server, a player may create characters belonging to either of two races: Human or Nephilim. Each server has several channels, which players can change between freely during gameplay, and either select one of their previously made characters, or create a new one.

To create a new character, players must choose between the two races of Humans or Nephilim. Characters from the two races can communicate and trade, and members of the two races can speak, email, group, and share tribes. The player selects the new character's class, such as Archers or Blue Mages for the Nephilim, or Blades, Fists or Red Mages for the Humans. Each class is unique to a particular race.

=== On-going gameplay ===
As characters become more developed, they gain skills, requiring the player to further define the abilities of that character. Crafting materials, such as leather, herbs, metal, wood, and gems, can also be used by characters. Characters may form or join tribes, allowing characters in the same tribes unified communications, a shared tribe name, and possibly identity, tribe bank and dues.

Much Turf Battles play involves questing. These quests, also called tasks or missions, are usually available from non-player characters (NPCs). Quests usually reward the player with experience points, items, and/or in-game money. It is also through quests that much of the game's story is told, both through the quest text, and through scripted NPC actions. Quests are linked by a common theme. Each quest is triggered by the completion of the previous quest, forming a quest chain. Quests commonly involve killing a number of creatures, gathering a certain number of resources, finding a difficult-to-locate object, speaking to various NPCs, visiting specific locations, interacting with objects in the world, or delivering an item from one place to another.

While a character can be played on its own, players can also form groups with others, in order to tackle more challenging content. In this way, character classes are used in specific roles within a group. In Turf Battles, when a character dies, they are resurrected in the nearest Safe Zone. When a character is killed by a monster, they lose some experience. Also, there is a possibility of dropping items the character had equipped, requiring the player to attempt to return the location they died at, to regain dropped items. When a character fights, the items equipped degrade, requiring in-game money and a NPC to repair them. Items that degrade heavily can become unusable until they are repaired.

Turf Battles contains a variety of mechanisms for player versus player (PvP) combat. Each server allows player versus player combat almost anywhere in the game world. In PVP environments, players can attack each other at almost any time or location. On all servers, there are special areas of the world where free-for-all combat is permitted. Battle arenas, for example, allow all players to engage each other without fear of penalty or loss of rank.

=== Setting ===
Turf Battles is a massively multiplayer online role playing game (MMORPG). It takes place in a 3D-representation of the world of Fomalhaut, which players can interact with through their characters. The game features two main lands on the continent of Fomalhaut, as well as numerous smaller lands and islands. In the game world, players use their characters to explore locations, defeat creatures, and complete quests, among other such activities. By doing these things, characters gain experience points. After a set number of experience points have been gained, a character gains a level and new stat points, opening up the option of learning new skills, using new items, exploring new areas, and attempting new quests. As a player explores new locations, they can "save" locations, both for future reference, and in order to teleport back to these locations, should the desire arise. Players can discover "crystal shifters" in newly discovered locations, and then use those NPCs in order to teleport to previously discovered locations in other parts of the world. Players can also use facilities such as NPCs, or "crystals", in order to move from one area of Fomalhaut to another. Although the game world remains reasonably similar from day to day, locations have changeable weather such as dust, snow, and storms.

A number of facilities are available to characters when in towns and cities. In each major city, characters can access a warehouse, in order to deposit items, such as treasure or crafted items. Each warehouse is unique to that character, with players able to purchase additional storage space. In the major cities of Fomalhaut, players can expect to see player hosted booths. These are effective for selling items that players have gained, or while the players wish to remain connected to the game, should they decide to go away from their keyboard.

Some of the harder challenges in Turf Battles require players to group together to complete them. These usually take place in dungeons and other difficult areas, which a group of characters can enter together. This allows players to explore areas and complete quests, with other players outside the group. Each major area has one main dungeon, and are designed for characters of varying progressions.

== Development ==
Turf Battles was first announced by HyperEngines LLC in October 2005. Development of the game from the Korean version has taken about 2 months, with extensive testing. The game was designed to be an open environment, where players are allowed to do what they please. Quests are optional, and were designed to help guide players, allow character development, and to spread characters across different zones, to try to avoid what developers call 'player collision'. The game interface allows players to customize appearance, controls, and other modifications.

=== Regional variations ===
IMAZIC distributed Turf Battles in the following countries: Japan, Korea, Taiwan, China, and the United States.

In Korea, the game is called Sephiroth (세피로스). Sephiroth is the base version of Turf Battles, written in Korean, and allowing those with only Korean Social Security Numbers to play.

In Taiwan, the game is called Sephiroth (凱旋). The game is written in the Chinese language, and is restricted solely to players who are located in Taiwan, Hong Kong, or Macao.

In China, the game is called Kaixuan (凯旋/Triumph). The game is written in the Chinese language, and is restricted solely to players who are located in Asia.

In Japan, the game is known as Sephiroth (セフィロス). Written in Japanese, the client download is currently only available to those who live in Japan.

== Community ==
Aside from playing the game and conversing in discussion topics, Turf Battles players often participate in the virtual community in creative ways. This includes, but is not limited to, fan artwork.
