= Perpetuum =

2010 video game

- Developer: Avatar Creations Ltd
- Engine: Custom (unnamed)
- Platform: Microsoft Windows
- Release: WW: 25 November 2010
- Genre: Vehicular combat MMORPG
- Mode: Multiplayer

Perpetuum is a video game by Avatar Creations Ltd. It is a player-driven persistent-world MMORPG set in a science fiction ground setting. Players pilot customisable robots on various islands connected by several teleports. These islands are either alpha ('safe' from attacks by players) or beta/gamma, meaning players can freely engage each other.

Players of Perpetuum are able to participate in a number of in-game professions and activities, including mining, logistics, missions, manufacturing, trading, artifact hunting and combat (both player versus environment and player versus player). The range of activities available to the player is facilitated by a character advancement system based upon extension points accumulation (EP) in real time, even while not logged into the game.

Perpetuum was first released worldwide via a digital distribution scheme on 25 Nov 2010, following a period of closed and open beta testing. The first major upgrade was the version of Perpetuum dubbed Terra Incognita, which was released on 4 May 2011. The second (current) major upgrade was released 1 June 2012, and is dubbed Gamma Frontier. The main feature of the upgrade is 24 new terraformable islands where player-built settlements (networkable buildings and defensive structures) can be constructed. In April 2014, Perpetuum has dropped its subscription payment model for a pay to play payment model., and released on Steam, being previously greenlit. The game closed its servers on 25 January 2018, with the server code being open sourced and handed over to the community.

== Setting ==
Set somewhere after 2208, the back story of Perpetuum explains that humanity, in search of alternative energy sources, has stumbled upon technology to create tiny particle-sized wormholes, creating shortcuts through spacetime. After sending miniature probes out to map known extrasolar planets, one of them stumbled upon a planet designated Nia, home to a synthetic, robot-like lifeform. It was soon discovered these lifeforms have unique and efficient ways to produce energy, so it was to become an objective for conquest. Earth-based IT specialists found a way by using probes to hack into the alien information system, enabling them to take over several lifeforms and set up a base, facilitated by the fact that most of the alien lifeforms were already divided by a long-standing war and were unable to respond quickly to the takeover. Now that the conquest has begun, the aliens have reinforced their networks and the war will have to be decided on the ground. As it stands, human pilots known as agents control their robots remotely, participating in the Perpetuum Project, with their main goal to transfer as much energy as possible back to earth.

Nia is home to three alien factions: the Pelistal Empire (green, preferring missile launchers), the Nuimqol Union (blue, preferring railguns) and the Thelodica Clan (yellow, preferring lasers). The faction representing Earth is known as the Syndicate, which will also provide new agents with an Arkhe, a weak but fully featured beginner robot. Alpha islands are represented by a syndicate foothold, also providing security for agents against other agents.

== Gameplay ==
Players start the game by either selecting a previously-created character or by creating a new one. Each Perpetuum account allows for up to three characters to be made. When players create a new character they start by choosing one of the three Earth megacorporations (ICS, Truhold-Markson, Asintec), followed by schools (combat, industrial, logistics) and further specializations. These choices also affect starting extensions and attributes. Choosing an Earth megacorporation also determines for which alien faction you'll receive starting extensions for, but by no means limit or determine what faction the player eventually can or cannot use.

=== Universe ===
The playing environment in Perpetuum consists of several islands, and have either alpha, beta or gamma status. Islands are connected by a teleport network.

Alpha islands are relative safe; player vs player (PvP) can not be initiated unless players activate their PvP flags, and NPC's are (with some rare exceptions) of relative low difficulty and/or value. Beta islands offer more of rarer resources, more challenges and higher rewards, but players can always attack each other. Additionally, beta island offer corporation-owned outposts, to be conquered from other corporations in what is known as an intrusion. This system was later improved, with a more organic mechanic, where ownership of an outpost must be reinforced by completing small objectives randomly set every 8–16 hours, ensuring the owner has a convincing foothold in the area.

All islands originally belonged to one of the three alien factions, and feature faction-specific textures and architecture.

=== Advancement ===
Unlike most other massively multiplayer online games, player characters in Perpetuum advance continuously over time by the accumulation of extension points (EP), a passive process that occurs in real world time so that the advancement process continues even if the player is not logged in. One EP is assigned every minute to a player's account's EP pool, from which the player can install abilities, or extensions, to any of up to 3 characters.

Any extension can be installed, depending on their prerequisites, but their rank (1 to 9) and attributes determine the cost for increasing levels. Although older players seem to have the advantage (having acquired more EP), younger players can install a wide assortment of extensions straight away, while older players will pay an increasingly larger amount of EP for smaller nominal advantages. Additionally, if a new player is willing to specialize, they can catch up quickly.

=== Economy ===
The in-game economy in Perpetuum is an open economy that is largely player-driven. Non-player character (NPC) merchants sell low level modules and ammo. The players themselves gather the necessary raw materials to manufacture a large portion of all of the robots, modules and ammunition in the game. NPC robots can be looted for items, kernels (to be sold or used for research, providing base knowledge to build items) and materials. The in-game currency is called NIC, an abbreviation for Nian Credit (the events of the game take place on the planet Nia).

The amount of money or materials in the universe is not fixed and, as such, the economy operates under supply and demand. The game provides support for the trading of in-game resources, including graphs of item price history. Some players operate primarily as traders, buying, selling and transporting goods to earn profits. Others operate primarily as producers, purchasing components or raw materials and transforming them, sometimes on massive scales, into useful items such as modules, robots, ammunition, or various technologies wanted by players. Others still operate as miners, collecting and sometimes processing the raw materials used in manufacturing to sell on to others in bulk.

=== Robots ===
Robots in Perpetuum are organized into four general classes: Light robots, assault robots, mechs and heavy mechs. With the 3 alien factions, the game follows a rock-paper-scissors scheme, where each faction is weak to one faction, but strong to the other. Additionally, there is a fourth industrial faction, but they feature no significant offensive capabilities.

Each robot has a different set of characteristics and can be fitted with different combinations of modules subject to their fitting requirements. Robots have a wide variety of characteristics, including (but not limited to) reactor size, CPU (robot's computer processing power), accumulator size and accumulator recharge rate (functionally, a battery for activating high powered systems), armor, maximum velocity, locking range, time and maximum number of lockable targets. Robot systems also receive bonuses to performance depending on the level of various appropriate extensions that have been activated by the robot's pilot. These bonuses usually correspond closely to the particular role that the robot has been designed for, and thus vary as widely as the roles of the robots.

One of the most important characteristics of a robot is the slots it has available for fitting modules. Each robot has a number of slots available, ranging from a handful to ten or more. Slots and modules come in three variants: head, legs, and chassis slots, with head modules fitting in a corresponding head slot and so on. Generally speaking, head slots can be considered electronics (such as scanners or sensor amplifiers), legs slots for engineering and chassis slots are for offensive and industrial modules.

== Players and communities ==
Players have several options when playing Perpetuum in regards to how they interact with the community. Some activities can be completed as a solo player, but most activities are more suitable for groups of players, for example corporations (similar to guilds in other MMOs), are run by a chief executive officer (CEO), who also controls the corporation's assets. Several other roles can be given to other corporation members, covering aspects such as finances, storage space, production, promotion, recruitment and diplomacy.

== Accounts and subscriptions ==
Users start playing Perpetuum by buying the game. No subscription is required.

== See also ==
- EVE Online
