= Twelve Sky =

2007 video game

- Developer: GXCW
- Publishers: Alt1, Aeria Games and Entertainment, Vortex Gaming, GXCW
- Engine: Vortex Gaming GX24VEngine
- Platform: Windows
- Release: NA: 2007; WW: 2023; CN: 2015
- Genre: Oriental Fantasy Massively Multiplayer Online Role Playing Game
- Modes: Multiplayer, Online

Twelve Sky, often referred to as 12 Sky, was a massively multiplayer online role-playing game. It is Korean developer Alt1's first released game set in the Oriental Fantasy universe launched in its home market in 2004. Aeria Games announced Twelve Sky Closed Beta on September 5, 2007. The Closed Beta date was set to be on September 18, 2007. Twelve Sky then went into Open Beta on October 12, 2007. AeriaGames announced the closing of the game on April 6, 2010 on their forums. The game officially closed on April 30, 2010 with their item mall closing on April 13, 2010.

On March 4, 2016, Shuangyashan Xincheng Network signed an agreement with South Korea's ALT1 company to transfer the copyright of the classic Korean martial arts 3D online game "Twelve Sky" series. The game was launched in mainland China in the same year, and GXCW will develop and operate subsequent versions.

There are multiple private servers running as of 2023 for the EU/NA communities, most prominent among them is the international project V-Sky, ran by Vortex Gaming.Vortex Gaming - 12 sky 2 The main premise of V-Sky is constant new updates of the latest CN version of the game, including 4th new faction, the Hangin.

== Gameplay ==
=== Starting ===
Twelve Sky does not require the player to pay for a subscription.

Each player can have 3 characters on a single account, with multiple accounts possible. Servers are all Player versus player (PvP) and Player versus environment (PvE). On any server a player may create characters belonging to only a single faction; Guanyin, Fujin or Jinong on any single account.

To create a new character players must choose between the factions of Guanyin, Fujin or Jinong. Characters from the factions can communicate and trade with only players of their faction, with the exception of a single zone in the game, and form guilds with only their faction. Each faction has a unique appearance and skill set available to them and players much choose their play style based on the attributes of the separate factions.

=== On-Going Gameplay ===
As the player gains levels, they receive stat points which may be used to upgrade the four stats: Strength, Dexterity, Vitality and Chi. Characters may also form or join guilds. Characters in the same guild have a private chat channel, a shared guild name, guild storage and possibly battle in duels.

Much Twelve Sky play involves questing, which through much of the game's story is told. Some quests are linked by a common theme, with the next quest triggered by the completion of the previous, forming a quest chain.

=== Setting ===
Twelve Sky takes place in a world based on Middle Ages China. The game features three main homelands, one for each faction. Although the game world remains reasonably similar from day to day, locations have changeable weather such as dust, snow and storms.

A number of facilities are available to characters when in towns and cities. In the major cities of Twelve Sky, players can expect to see player hosted booths.

== Development ==
Twelve Sky was first released by GigasSoft in Korea, 2004. Since then it has expanded to China, Japan, and North America.

=== Regional Variations ===
ALT1 distributes Twelve Sky in the following countries: Korea, China.

=== Closing of the AeriaGames Version ===
Aeria Games, the publisher of the English version of Twelve Sky, announced the closing of the game on April 6, 2010 on their forums, and officially closed the game on April 30, with their item mall closing on April 13.

=== Twelve Sky NA ===
The newest Twelve Sky (12Sky) Private Server launched on May 1, 2023 boasting reduced ping for North American players and updated in game features from the original version.

==== Vortex Gaming ====
Vortex Gaming has announced the grand reopening of 12Sky for the international English speaking community under the name of their project V-Sky. Closed beta testing took place on 2 February 2023 and is still running nowadays.

== Early Engine ==
GigasSoft was established at 8 December 2002 by C.E.O Changwoo-Hong and 15 employees.
