= Tower of Fantasy =

2022 action role-playing video game

- Developer: Hotta Studio
- Publishers: Android, iOS, Windows: CN/KOR: Perfect World; TW: Iwplay World; WW: Level Infinite (11 August 2022 - 25 February 2024); WW: Perfect World (25 February 2024 - ); PlayStation 4, PlayStation 5: WW: Perfect World
- Engine: Unreal Engine 4
- Platforms: Android, iOS, Windows, PlayStation 4, PlayStation 5, HarmonyOS NEXT
- Release: Android, iOS, Windows: CHN: 16 December 2021; WW: 11 August 2022; PlayStation 4, PlayStation 5: WW: 8 August 2023
- Genre: Action role-playing
- Modes: Single-player, multiplayer

Tower of Fantasy (Chinese: 幻塔; pinyin: Huàn Tǎ; lit. 'Fantasy Tower') is a free-to-play action role-playing game developed by Hotta Studio, a Suzhou-based subsidiary of Perfect World. The game is set in a planet called Aida, contaminated with a radioactive energy called Omnium after a cataclysm that nearly wiped out human civilization and mutated the ecology of the planet. The player plays a wanderer that explores a futuristic planet and fights aliens and hostile forces as they advance through the story.

Tower of Fantasy was released on 16 December 2021 in China, and 11 August 2022 internationally.

== Gameplay ==
Tower of Fantasy is a 3D "shared world" action role-playing game played with a 3rd-person view. The player controls a customizable character avatar who interacts with non-player characters and other entities and collects items as they travel around in the open virtual world. The player character can run, jump, sprint, climb, swim, and can equip various vehicles to move around in the world. The character's special movements with the exception of sprinting are limited by a regenerating stamina bar that slowly depletes as they continue in that movement mode. As the player character interacts with the world and the story, they earn experience points which increases their level and improves their combat stats.

The player fights enemies with various equippable weapons through a hack-and-slash combat system where the player character swaps between weapons to access their unique attacks and abilities. Up to 3 weapons can be equipped and can be switched at any time. Each weapon has a basic and a charged attack, and jumping into the air enables stamina-consuming aerial attacks and a plunging attack form. Ranged weapons have a basic auto-target attack mode and an aimed mode. Weapons also have a unique cooldown-based skill. As the player attacks enemies the inactive weapons build up charge and when fully switching weapons unleashes a powerful discharge attack. To evade enemy attacks the player can dodge in any direction, but are limited by a dodge stamina meter. Timing a dodge just before an enemy attack lands activates 'phantasia' mode that freezes time and all enemies within a certain radius for a few seconds as well as fully charging the player's alternate weapons, giving the player a window of time to deal massive damage while their enemies are immobilised.

There are different types of weapons and each weapon also has one of 3 roles (offense, defense, support) and various stats that affect how they work in the game. In addition to base damage values weapons have an elemental attack type (flame, ice, altered, volt, physical), a shatter statistic that affect its effectiveness against shields, and a charge statistic that affects how quickly weapons charge up when using that weapon. An elemental attack can be activated by charging an attack and when used grant certain effects and debuffs against enemies. Equipping weapons with certain combinations of roles also creates Weapon Resonance that grants various buffs. Certain weapons, known as Simulacrum, possess an AI representation of their former wielders. In addition to having high upgrade potential Simulacrum can be activated to transform the player character into the Simulacrum character and gain access to their unique Traits. Upgrading these Simulacra also unlocks content that allows the player to learn about the characters within the Simulacra.

As a "shared world" RPG, players on the same server co-exist with and can encounter other players in the same instance of the game world. Tower of Fantasy supports co-op play where up to 4 players on the same server can team up to play together to explore the world, complete general or multiplayer-specific missions, or fight world bosses, and PvP where players can challenge each other to duels in open-world combat, or fight in an arena mode called Apex League to advance up a leaderboard to obtain special rewards.

== Plot ==
In 2653 the comet Mara was discovered, and within it a vast reserve of the potent energy called Omnium. To harness this energy the people of planet Aida constructed the Tower of Fantasy, but just 5 years after its completion it suffered a catastrophic overload and explosion of Omnium energy. The fallout heavily irradiated the planet, mutated living things into dangerous monsters, devastated human society, and fractured Aida's regions into isolated spacetimes. Decades after the disaster, humanity has survived thanks to "suppressors" developed to counteract the radiation. Aida is crawling with aggressive mutant humans and wildlife turned into monsters called Aberrants by exposure to Omnium radiation, while the scientific organization Hykros helps people adapt and further utilize Omnium. Opposed to Hykros is a shadowy organization called the Heirs of Aida, which views Omnium as a source of misery, and fights to end Omnium research.

The customizable protagonist is known as a Wanderer, who suffers a violent confrontation that drains their personal energy suppressor, causing them to lose consciousness and suffer amnesia. The Wanderer is rescued and taken in by Zeke and his younger sister Shirli, two prominent residents of the peaceful local outpost known as the Astra Shelter. Peace is short-lived as the Astra Shelter is brutally attacked by the Ravagers, a faction of mutated, hostile marauders. During the raid, Shirli is infected by Omnium radiation. Desperate to save his sister from certain death, Zeke makes a harrowing decision to turn to the mysterious Heirs of Aida—who claim to possess a method to save her—and departs with her. The Wanderer must journey across the expanse of Aida, tracking down Zeke and Shirli, navigating political intrigue between Hykros and the Heirs of Aida, and investigating the Omnium Towers.

== Development ==
Tower of Fantasy was developed by Hotta Studio and published by Perfect World Games. It began production in 2018. Producer Kee Zhang said that more and more online games began to label them as open worlds, which popularized the concept of open worlds and promoted the birth of such games. Due to his love for this type of game, Hotta Studio decided to develop an open world game. It was developed in Unreal Engine 4.

On 28 October 2020, Tower of Fantasy opened its first test. The production team received a lot of feedback from players. KEE pointed out that the overall design framework of the first test was recognized by players, but the quality of the game did not meet players' expectations. KEE also said: "For games that have not been tested by test users, its completion level is in a "quantum state", which may be very high or very low" Subsequently, the members of the production team decided to continue to improve the quality of the game and compiled and released an optimization list called baldness list 1.0, which lists hundreds of content that needs to be optimized in the game.
