= Fantage =

2008 video game

- Logo
- Platform: Online
- Release: March 17, 2008 (discontinued June 30, 2018)

Fantage was a MMORPG (massively multiplayer online role-playing game) involving a virtual world containing a range of online games and activities, developed by Fantage Inc. The game featured a customizable anime-style cartoon avatar, called a "Fantagian", that users can customize with items ranging from hair to clothing and accessories. Fantage was released to the general public on March 17, 2008, and had since expanded into a large online community— the game had over 16 million registered users by January 2012 and over 30 million by December 2014.

The game was designed for the ages of 6 to 16. According to its founders, Fantage was focused on child safety, made possible by a three-tiered safety system. This safety system had several features, such as professional chat moderation, automatic word filtering, an in-game user reporting system, and varying chat options for parents.

On May 17, 2018, Fantage announced that the game would shut down on June 30, 2018. At 12:36 am EDT on July 1, 2018, Fantage closed down its servers to all users.

== History ==
According to Dean Takahashi of VentureBeat, Fantage began development after the founders of the game, David Hwang and Peter Bae, created their company in January 2007, and the game was initially an educational math website until they received negative reception from a focus group of kids. A closed beta version of the game was available on October 29, 2007, which granted beta testers full access to features normally available through a paid membership, and the game went open beta on January 1, 2008. The game eventually released on March 17, 2008, where beta testers were gifted with a month of free membership, 1,000 Stars, and exclusive Beta Tester hair items, while new members received two weeks of free membership.

In 2009–2010, Fantage received strategic investments from Nexon. These investments allowed Fantage to hire additional designers and key developers. The resulting site expansion and quality enhancement led to swift growth. In less than four months, from November 2009 to February 2010, Fantage completed the entire site renewal, which involved upgrades of more than thirty mini-games. Within a year, the user base grew from 3 million to 7.7 million registered users.

Fantage developed and employed its own real time mass data processing technology, which enables 20 million users to access the site without any inconvenience. This database and server side program was created by Byungsoo Son, Frank Kim, Sungwon Um, and Dongpyo Lee, who were all key developers for the game. Fantage Inc. was headquartered in Fort Lee, New Jersey and run by Nexon.

The message Fantage's development team left for the game's users regarding the game's discontinuation.

=== Overseas ===
On December 14, 2009, it was reported on a Japanese online gaming news site, Game Watch, that Nexon was releasing Fantage in Japan in February 2010. The game was eventually released on February 10, 2010, as "Oshare Land Fantage" (おしゃらんどファンテージ), which was nicknamed "Fantage Japan" by players outside of Japan. As Nexon of Japan owned this version of the game, a Nexon Japan ID was required to create an account and to log in, and Nexon Points were used as another currency for the game. Some features from the game made for this version eventually were released internationally, such as two eye sets and some clothing items (though they were altered somewhat for unknown reasons). Notable features exclusive to this version of the game were Rare items being accessible from shops (they are normally available by gem combinations in the original game), the absence of a paid membership, and Magic Boxes, which contained special items. Oshare Land Fantage shut down on December 15, 2010.

Nexon of Europe released a version of Fantage for European users in 2010, and similar to Oshare Land Fantage, the game required a Nexon Europe ID to create an account. The game shut down on July 20, 2011. Fantage has also been released onto France and Germany.

=== Mobile development ===
Since 2011, Fantage Inc. has created several mobile applications of web game features, such as Fantage IDfone, Fantage Bullseye, Fantage Fish Fish, LeShop - Fashion Designer, and Starblaze. Their apps were available on App Store and Google Play, with a few exceptions not being available on Google Play. In 2014, Fantage released an iPad app called Fantage Comet, which was similar to the original game, but took place on a different area. Like some of the other apps, Fantage Comet was compatible with the original game, where users were able to log in and buy exclusive items from the app that could also be used into the online game. In recent times, many of the apps received negative reception from players. The company's Google Play page was shut down upon announcement of the game's closure.

=== Discontinuation ===
On May 17, 2018, Fantage announced that the game would be permanently closed on June 30, 2018. The game stopped receiving membership payments as of May 17, 2018, and the game's payment page and related mobile apps have been closed down. In commemoration of the game's discontinuation, the game hosted its final event, called "Farewell Party", which ran through May 17 through May 23, 2018. Users were given free items on each day of the event they have logged into the game, and Premium Membership was given to all users from June 1 through June 30, 2018. Fantage finally closed its doors on July 1, 2018, at 12:36 AM.

== Business model ==
Fantage started out as a self-funded organization, but the company later received an infusion of capital from Nexon. Initial admission into Fantage was free and users can continue to use it as such; however, premium membership was required to access the full site including most clothing items, rare items, most gems, customization options, and most pets.

Users could also purchase eCoins or Gold, which were additional currencies alongside Stars, in bulk amounts for set fees to use in-game for micro transactions. eCoins and Gold could be used to purchase almost every item, but only eCoins could be used to buy pet codes to speed up pet hatching, while only Gold could be used to purchase Limited items and items from other players in MyMall, an area in the game that provided users with premium membership the ability to sell items.

== Environment ==
Screenshot of in-game environment

Once users created an account, they were given a basic tutorial and eventually a few items and a basic house. To move around in the world, players would click on where they wanted their avatar to go. Players had the option of opening their home to everyone, just their buddies, or no one other than the owner themselves. Players were also given ID Cards (later changed to IDfones, which were initially called "myFones" in 2009), which were accessible by clicking on the user's avatar and provided information about said user, such as the amount of in-game money the user had or the player's overall level, which was made up by the Medals the player earned for their user. Many of these Medals would be invisible to others unless the user had a premium membership.

Fantage took place on the titular floating island, which consisted of 13 main areas for users to explore: Downtown, Uptown, Mt. Fantage, Castle, Carnival, Beach, Forest, Fantage School, Pet Town, User Home, Sea Breeze, Lighthouse, and the Island; inside most of these main areas had additional smaller areas, such as shops and areas containing mini-games. There were several shops where players could purchase items with any of Fantage's 3 currencies; Stars, eCoins and Gold. Stars could be earned by playing games; eCoins by buying with real money, watching advertisements, or daily check-in; and Gold by buying, or through a transfer system in MyMall.

=== Games ===
Fantage had a selection of mini-games, some of which were multiplayer games. Some of the website's notable games were Top Models Fashion Show (a fashion show game), Splash! (a water balloon game), and Rocket Board (a roller coaster game). Users would earn a quantity of Stars depending on the player's score. After 2014's "Fantage Cataclysm" event, an event for the game's 6th anniversary that also included additions to the game's lore and a new redesign for the game's map, most of the mini-games in Fantage were compiled and moved to the Retro Arcade, located at the Carnival area.

There was also the Creature Area, which had contained the Creature Arena and Creature Shop. Users could enter as a Creature purchasable from the Creature Shop and play with a variety of trampolines, cannons, and other things while collecting Stars. After the "Fantage Cataclysm", the Creature Area was removed, with the Creature Arena and Creature Shop being moved to the Forest.

=== Pets ===
In 2010, Fantage introduced Pets and the Pet Town to players. Users could collect pets by purchasing and hatching eggs or by using pet codes. Premium Members could hatch all pets using eggs; non-Premium members could only hatch two pets using eggs. Users who obtained eCoins were able to purchase Magic Codes to hatch a specific pet they wanted and at a faster rate. There were three magic code hatching times available 1 hour, 20 minute, or Instant. Occasionally, Fantage would release certain holiday-themed eggs that premium members can buy for a certain number of stars to get limited holiday pets. An additional family, Codies, were only available by collecting and assembling multiple items from Captain Cody, Fantage's resident superhero.

Premium members also had the option to have their pets trail behind them as they explored Fantage and to let pets wander on the first floor of their home. All users could use their pets for Pet Games, which were located in the Pet Town area that specifically features pets. For players without pets (or enough pets, in the case of one game, Wild Rumble), Pet Games would lend them a pet to play with. The Top Models Fashion Show game was eventually updated to allow all users to use their pets to earn more points.

=== Farming ===
In 2013, Fantage introduced Farms to all players. Farms were accessible from the player's house or through their IDfone. Players were given 3 plots of land to plant seeds of various plants, which could be bought with Stars and planted with Sun Energy. After a specified period of time, the resulting crops could be harvested with Sun Energy to earn Stars. Farming also gave points to a certain Farming medal for the user's overall level.

Much like FarmVille, players had to wait real time for plants to grow and could have helped out farms belonging to other players. Players could help out an unlimited number of people a day, but each farm could only be helped out three times per day.

=== Mission Center ===
Fantage had a Mission Center where players could participate in Missions. There were various Missions for users to play from and each Mission could be replayed once they were finished at least once. Upon completion (or re-completion) of a Mission, players were rewarded with points on their Mission Medal, which, like all Medals, counts toward the overall level of the user. Many of these missions had segments with mini-games and puzzles, which must be completed in order to progress further into the mission. These missions were often related to the creation of certain areas, such as the Lighthouse being created for the Mad Scientist mission, and some have provided some characterization to Fantage's NPCs.

=== Parties and socialization ===
Users may add up to 200 friends, or "buddies", and chat through instant messenger one-to-one or through a group chat. Users could also click on a player's avatar and click the ignore button, so that the ignored user's chat won't be seen to the player. Users could delete a buddy any time. If any user is bullying or using inappropriate behavior, players may click on the report button and the reported user is immediately ignored.

Fantage's chat system allowed players to have one of three chat modes set on their avatar. The first mode, "Fantage Chat", was the normal mode where users can chat freely, though some messages will be filtered and will not be visible to others if they contain private information. The second mode, "Safe Chat", has the normal chat bubble disabled in favor of limited chat phrases, and was the mode recommended to parents concerned for their children during the game's run. The third mode, "No Chat", completely disables the user from chatting or seeing others chat in the game.

Parties were later introduced in 2010 and could be used to invite large numbers of people to the player's house. Players may choose the theme of the party and whether the party was for everyone in the server or their friends (with later features allowing different music tracks to be played). Only one party could only be hosted at a time, even if the player leaves one server and tries to create another party in another server. Hosting a party costs 50 Stars, but players could buy additional features to the party, such as piñatas and exclusive party-themed stickers. Parties were previously limited to premium members, but in 2014, all users were able to host their own parties.

=== Community Features ===
Fantage featured a weekly in-game magazine called The Comet , which was released every Wednesday. The Comet headquarters were located in Mt. Fantage. Each week, users could submit entries for the magazine's art contest and writing contest. Sections of the magazine included the Writer's Den, Comic, Fanart, and Reporters.

=== Education and charity ===
The Fantage School was introduced in 2011 as a new area with a variety of educational mini-games, ranging from math and chess to language arts and geography. The first floor contained art, math, social studies, and language arts, while the second floor had chess, checkers, and a trivia game. The bottom floor also contained an area where players could create their own Private Classrooms, where groups of players can enter and try to beat each other's scores on the mini-games provided in this area.

Fantage has collaborated with a school in Los Angeles in 2012, where a fifth-grade class would participate in the "Fantage School Challenge". The challenge consists of the fifth-grade class being separated into two teams, where they would play Fantage's educational games to see which team had the better scores.

Fantage has also held events in the past where users can donate their Stars to charity. Some charity sites the game has been noted to work with include Child's Play in 2011 and Delivering Good (which was known then as K.I.D.S.) in 2013.

== Reception ==
Within its first few years of launch, Fantage has gained positive reviews, with most of the praise going towards the game's kid-friendly environment. On March 9, 2010, Fantage received the Editor's Choice Award from the Children's Technology Review for excellence in children's interactive media, with the website's review on the game saying: "Fantage, or 'fantastic age' is a responsive, safe and no-fail MMO that resembles Club Penguin back in the good old days." Dean Takahashi of VentureBeat notes that Fantage offers "fun games and social activities in a safe, parent-friendly setting", and how the game developed much more than 200 kid-friendly virtual world games that were then reported of being under development. A user on GamersInfo.net by the name of "Alladania" states that the game "has the potential to be more socially involving than games for the younger set but has enough other things going on that a lot of social chit-chat isn't a requirement to have fun." Jo McClelland of Time has acknowledged the site as one of the best social networks for preteens. Carolina Ribeiro of Portuguese online magazine TechTudo believes the game can be enjoyed by kids while protecting their real identity and appearance with the game's avatars.

== Legacy and Pixel Park ==
A day after Fantage announced their discontinuation, rumors of an attempt to recreate Fantage's environment by creating a private server with the game's files surfaced. This project was then confirmed under the name Fantage Legacy. The project, which promised fan-requested ideas such as all users being given Premium Membership and the absence of in-game currencies other than Stars, gained many support from fans of the original game.

The Pixel Park logo. A rainbow effect was previously used during the 2019 Pride Month.

On July 12, 2018, the Fantage Legacy team announced on the project's official blog that the project was being discontinued, due to an e-mail from the official Fantage team that warned them of possible legal action that would accuse the team of Fantage copyright infringement. Despite this, it was also announced that same day that they would be working on a game similar to Fantage (codenamed Plan Z), as the Fantage Legacy team continued posting updates through their blog until May 28, 2019, when they revealed Pixel Park, the successor to Fantage Legacy. The Fantage Legacy website closed on May 31, and Pixel Park eventually launched its public beta on November 28. The first few hours of launch saw 156 users playing the game. The game had features such as clothing, chat, Player Cards, events, and other features.

On January 10, 2020, Pixel Park closed its public beta, and registration for the game closed. Existing users (more than 1,500) were still able to play the game. On April 12, 2020, it was announced that development for Pixel Park would be suspended due to lack of finances and support. The game shut down on April 30. As of May 5, 2020, the website is no longer online.
