= StarQuest Online =

2007 video game

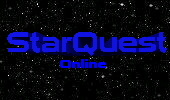
- Developer: NeXeon Technologies Inc
- Publisher: NeXeon Technologies Inc
- Platform: Windows
- Release: 2007
- Genre: MMORPG
- Mode: Multiplayer

StarQuest Online was a massively multiplayer online role playing game taking place in a large universe. It was created by Castle Thorn Software. In 2009 NeXeon Technologies partnered with Castle Thorn to support development of the game, but in mid-2014 the game had been shut down.

== Description ==
The game was set in the 23rd century whereby the players undertake the one of several roles across four playable factions. The player is set on a ship on their own, or with several other real players from around the world, and take the role aboard a starship such as the Helmsman, Tactical Officer or even the Captain of the ship. The player can walk around the ship as one of five races depending on their faction and customize the ship to their liking. The ships can then partake in combat with the NPC Pirate faction, or in PvP with other factions or player pirates.

The game itself is an online persistent sandbox where there anything can happen at any time. A hostile player ship can sneak up on another player and attack at any time, in any solar system. Typically combat takes place in the vast endless plane of 'Hyperspace' the method used to travel between star systems. When the player logs off, the world still develops, civilians will still have their colonies growing, ships will still fly towards a destination while offline, and players can still be attacked if their ship is moving.

There are over 17,000 star systems in StarQuest Online, and approximately 100,000 individual planets. Star positions were taken from Hipparcos satellite data for positional accuracy. Each planet was then created using a stellar dust accretion program based on the mass of each star. There are over 150 non-player character (NPC) races, and many other alien creatures inhabiting these worlds. Players can choose from three unique races when creating their characters. Several different classes of starships are available for players to command, explore, and battle with.

Main bridge of UAS starship.

StarQuest Online went live on September 21, 2007, after more than two years of beta testing. After a free thirty-day trial period, players are required to pay a fee of $9.99 per month.

== Gameplay and game dynamics ==
Players were able to do things like command ships, and set up colonies. There are no pre-programmed game environments, and no instance dungeons. Therefore, actions, victories, or colonies set up by players will remain, and affect game outcomes.

StarQuest Online was one of the only space-based MMORPG where individual players can work together as crewmen on the same vessel, operating different control stations on the bridge.

Administrators provide some scripted missions. However, players are fully able to create their own organizations, colonies and other structures within the game. The main organization within the games is the United Systems Alliance, which is the "official" player organization. Players may choose to create characters which are independent of the Alliance, but several alien empires are fully controlled by non-player characters.

Starships require several players to function. Almost all starships have a real-world schedule to function, and cannot be used at all without at least one of the players present who serves as a senior officer in the game. Exception to this rule is civilian owned shipping which may by its nature vary a great degree.

== Reception ==
PC Gamer editors James Davenport and Wes Fenlon described StarQuest Online in retrospect as an "unconventional, and ugly, sci-fi MMO that let players fly starships together. It was Star Citizen before Star Citizen, minus the millions of dollars."

The German gaming magazine MeinMMO remarked that StarQuest Online had a decent 7-year run despite its "very weak graphics". In a survey asking which of 17 dead MMORPGs readers would like to see return, StarQuest Online came out last.
