= Twelve Sky 2 =

- Developer: BEGA Games
- Publishers: (European Union) Genius Orc Entertainment (United States) Red Fox Games
- Platform: Windows
- Genre: Fantasy MMORPG
- Mode: Multiplayer

Twelve Sky 2 is a massively multiplayer online role-playing game (MMORPG) by Begagames.

Set in Ancient China, players are thrown into an age old conflict between three warring Clans. Centered on the reemergence of a new faction, players must fight for the honor of their brothers or turn their backs in their hour of need.

The Twelve Sky 2 development team attended the 6th. annual ChinaJoy exposition, which featured their game, in 2008. As a result of ChinaJoy, Twelve Sky 2 was also featured on the udn.com news site in their report on 18 July 2008.

On March 4, 2019, BEGA Games signed an agreement with South Korea's ALT1 company to transfer the copyright of the "Twelve Sky" series of classic Korean martial arts online games. The agreement stipulates that BEGA Games enjoys the copyright, development rights and independent operation rights of the "Twelve Sky" series of online games.

== Gameplay ==
While these two games can be played independently of each other, many elements introduced in Twelve Sky, have subsequently been imported into Twelve Sky 2, although somewhat modified. For example, once again there are 3 established factions, each with their respective territories, weapon classes and armours to choose from, when first creating a character avatar. However, with the equalization of the 3 factions' statistics and attributes, as well as the addition or resurgence of a fourth faction, and that faction's influence and territories, the similarities between the two games end there.

This fourth faction or Sky, is voluntarily populated by players from the first 3 factions. The fourth faction choice is automatically made available as a character path, only when a player has reached the status of Master level 1(or Adept Level 1 in other countries), which is the equivalent of 113 levels. In order to join the fourth faction, a player must relinquish all ties to his original faction and their territories, i.e., a guild membership, if any, must be terminated and friend lists cleared. Also, once the player has joined the fourth faction, the bond is permanent. That character avatar cannot return to his previous status. He may choose not to participate in any one faction's efforts, in essence becoming a lone or rogue player.

In addition to a fourth faction, an alliance system has also been put into place, to allow for a formal recognition of power sharing and especially, of offensive battle plans. This alliance system, restricted to a maximum of 2 factions, once established by the leaders, extends to all of the members of the two allied factions. As a result, during battles, the allied players will no longer be red-flagged as enemies to one another. Allied players will be able to communicate with each other at any time, just as they would with members of their own faction, as long as the alliance is in effect.

This game's developer is especially proud of the GXD game engine, which was designed in-house, and from which the game greatly benefits.

There is a wide variety of mobs, all artistically rendered which, when attacked, display the typical color-coded alerts, with respect to the level of the mobs in the environment, versus the players' levels. The generally accepted protocol is used, i.e., grey, pink or red colors to denote mobs below, within or above the attacking player's level.

Level tiers
	NA	Global
Beginner	1-112	1–112
Master/Adept	M1-M33	A1-A33
God/Deity	G1-G12	D1-D12
(Final phase)	G12 (R1-R12)	D12 (R1-R12)

== Publishing history ==
- 2008 GF YOYO, (China)
- 2008 Game Flier, (Taiwan) and (Malaysia)
- 2008 KTH, Inc., (South Korea)
- 2009 YNK Japan Inc., (Japan)
- 2009 MAYN Interactive Pte Ltd., (Europe)
- 2009 Aeria Games & Entertainment, Inc., (North America)
- 2009 Gamesoft Technology Inc., (Philippines)
- 2009 PT Teracord Indonesia., (Indonesia)
- 2017 Red Fox Games (North America)
- 2021 Genius Orc Entertainment (Europe)
