= NProtect GameGuard =

Anti-cheating root toolkit

nProtect GameGuard
- Developer: INCA Internet Co., Ltd.
- Operating system: Microsoft Windows
- Type: Anti-cheating
- License: Proprietary
- Website: nprotect.com/en/products/nprotect/gameguard

nProtect GameGuard (sometimes called GG) is an anti-cheating rootkit developed by INCA Internet. It is widely installed in many online games to block possibly malicious applications and prevent common methods of cheating. nProtect GameGuard provides B2B2C (Business to Business to Consumer) security services for online game companies and portal sites. The software is considered to be one of three software programs which "dominate South Korea's domestic online game security market".

GameGuard uses rootkits to proactively prevent cheat software from running. GameGuard hides the game application process, monitors the entire memory range, terminates applications defined by the game vendor and INCA Internet to be cheats (QIP for example), blocks certain calls to DirectX functions and Windows APIs, keylogs keyboard input, and auto-updates itself as new possible threats surface.

Since GameGuard works like a rootkit, players may experience unintended and potentially unwanted side effects. If set, GameGuard blocks any installation or activation of hardware and peripherals (e.g., a mouse) while the program is running. Since GameGuard monitors any changes in the computer's memory, it will cause performance issues when the protected game loads multiple or large resources all at once.

Additionally, some versions of GameGuard had an unpatched privilege escalation bug, allowing any program to issue commands as if they were running under an Administrator account.

GameGuard possesses a database on game hacks based on security references from more than 260 game clients. Some editions of GameGuard are now bundled with INCA Internet's Tachyon anti-virus/anti-spyware library, and others with nProtect Key Crypt, an anti-key-logger software that protects the keyboard input information.

== List of online games using GameGuard ==
GameGuard is used in many online games.

- 9Dragons
- Atlantica Online
- Blackshot
- Blade & Soul
- Cabal Online
- Combat Arms: Reloaded
- Combat Arms: The Classic
- Darkeden
- Digimon Masters Online
- City Racer
- Dragon Saga
- Flyff
- Grand Chase
- Horizon Walker
- La Tale
- Legend of Mir 3
- Lineage 1 & 2
- MapleStory
- Metin2
- Mir4 Global
- Mu Legend
- Mu Online
- Fleet Mission: NavyField
- PangYa
- Phantasy Star Online 2
- Phantasy Star Online: Blue Burst
- Playpark Moxiang
- Priston Tale
- Ragnarok Online
- Ran Online
- Rappelz
- Return of Warrior
- RF Online
- Riders of Icarus
- Rohan: Blood Feud
- Royal Crown
- Rumble Fighter
- Seal Online
- Smash Legends
- Soul of the Ultimate Nation: Classic Edition
- SoulWorker
- Starseed: Ashina Trigger
- Summoners War: Chronicles
- Summoners War: Rush
- Uncharted Waters Online
- Undecember
