= I.O. Entertainment =

- Industry: Video games
- Founded: 2001
- Headquarters: Seoul, South Korea
- Key people: BangBokir (CEO)
- Products: Survival Project; Lost Saga
- Website: ioenter.com

I.O. Entertainment was a South Korean-based Developer of Lost Saga and Survival Project. I.O. Entertainment's Survival Project was developed prior to November 2001, and was officially released in 2003. I.O. Entertainment's second game, Lost Saga was developed, and released independently on February 26, 2009, and continues to be updated as the source version of the game with occasional updates.
On March 24, 2011, Joymax announced the acquisition of I.O. Entertainment.

== Survival Project ==
Currently, all versions of the game have shut down, with the South Korean version having shut down last on February 24, 2013.

== Lost Saga in the Western Market ==
North American Lost Saga (NALS) was hosted by Z8Games for Canadian and American users, with availability on Steam. The service was shut down on September 13, 2019, with no indication on whether or not the closing would be permanent. However, in February 2021, a company called Papaya Play emerged with an announcement that they would be taking over the service for NALS, bringing the game back to the market. Their tenure began with a closed beta that started and ended the same month. However, less than 24 hours before official launch, it was announced by Papaya Play that they would not be launching the game after all, citing issues with the native developers of the game. This effectively kept Papaya Play's version of NALS from ever getting out of beta. Lost Saga has not been launched in the western market since, keeping Z8Games as NALS' last official host. Prior to Z8Games' tenure, NALS was hosted by both WeMade USA and OGPlanet, both of whom shut down and transferred their service of NALS during different parts of 2013.

South American Lost Saga (SALS) was hosted by Softnyx, until it shut down on July 31, 2015. SALS serviced the Latin American region, which included South America, Central America, The Caribbean's, and Mexico. Brazil was removed from the service region due to poor connection speeds, and difficulties of communication with the otherwise majority Spanish speaking players.

European Lost Saga, (EULS) was hosted by OGPlanet's Europe division, then was re-released by Nexon Europe, who shut it down for the second time on April 8, 2015.

== Lost Saga in the Eastern Market ==
Korean Lost Saga (KLS) is published by VALOFE co Ltd in partnership with Wemade, and is available for South Korean users.

Thai Lost Saga (THLS) has shutdown, after being originally hosted by Garena Thailand. On January 7, 2019, GODLIKE Games announced that they acquired the publishing rights for Lost Saga from Valofe, and a new server will be launched early in 2019 The Thai server seems to be available as of 15 June 2026.

Taiwanese Lost Saga (TWLS) was being hosted by Valofe, after having received a transfer, and has shutdown on June 27, 2022.

Indonesian Lost Saga (ILS) was hosted by Gemscool, until it shut down on June 30, 2020. It is currently being hosted by Gravity Game Link, under the name Lost Saga Origin which opened on April 6, 2021.

Japanese Lost Saga (JPLS) has shut down, and was hosted by CJ Internet Japan.

Chinese Lost Saga (CLS) was hosted by Tencent's gaming division, and featured exclusive content creation licensing rights. It was closed in October 2016.

== See also ==
- Survival Project
- Lost Saga
