= .erl =

Files with the .erl filename extension may be:

- Erlang source code files
- nProtect GameGuard files
