= Wemade Max =

South Korean video game developer

- Type: Public
- Traded as: KRX: 101730
- Industry: Video games
- Genre: MMORPG
- Predecessor: Joymax (1997-2010)
- Founded: April 10, 1997
- Headquarters: Seoul, South Korea
- Key people: Gil Hyung Lee
- Products: Silk Road Online, Digimon Masters
- Number of employees: 218
- Parent: WeMade Entertainment
- Subsidiaries: IO Entertainment
- Website: www.wemademax.com

Wemade Max is a South Korean video game developer. Wemade Max initially published games for the PC then expanded to other platforms (including mobile devices). Wemade Max runs a data center in the United Kingdom and a customer service center in the Philippines. They are the creators of Silkroad Online and Karma Online. They also hosted the English version of Digimon Masters until 2016.

== History ==
Joymax was founded in 1997.

The company's original name was Joymax, but it was acquired by Wemade in 2010 and subsequently renamed Wemade Max. It specializes in developing and servicing PC online and mobile games. Notable PC online games include Silkroad Online, while its mobile games portfolio includes MIR4, MIR4 Global, Wind Runner, God of Matgo, Everytown, Restaurant Paradise, Abyssrium, and Cat for You. The company operates through its subsidiaries, including LightCON, Wemade Connect, and Wemade Next. The company is currently developing more than ten new mobile game titles. In 2022, they were the eleventh largest company in South Korea's software and programming market sector by market capitalization.

== Games ==
| Title | Developer | Genre | Status | Ref. |
|---|---|---|---|---|
| Silkroad Online Marviex | Wemade Maximos | MMORPG | Active since 2004. | |
| Karma Online | Dragonfly | FPS | Closed | |
| Digimon Masters | Digitalic | MMORPG | 2011-2016 (moved to Gameking). | |
| ICARUS Online (aka NED Online) | Wemade Max | MMORPG | Active since 2014. | |
| Deco Online | Rocksoft | MMORPG | Shut down in 2010. | |
| Final Odyssey | Wemade Max | RTS | Released in January 1999 | |
| Tangoo & Ullashong | Wemade Max | Arcade | Released in July 2001 | |
| Atrox | Wemade Max | RTS | Released in Germany in 2001. Released in English in May 2002. | |
| Tangoo & Ullashong 2 | Wemade Max | Arcade | Released in December 2002 | |
| Age of Wanderer | Wemade Max | Beat 'em up | Released in January 2003 | |
| Yorang, Little Fox | Wemade Max | Arcade | Released in August 2003 | |
| Bumpy Crash | Wemade Max | Arcade, racing | Released in January 2010 | |
| Wind Runner Adventure | Wemade Max | Arcade | Released in September 2016 | |
| Aero Strike | Wemade Max | Arcade | Released in November 2016 | |
| Star Wars: Starfighter Missions | Wemade Max | Arcade | Released in November 2020 | |
