= Astellia =

2018 video game

- Developer: Studio 8
- Publishers: Barunson E&A, Friends Games Corp.
- Engine: Unreal Engine 3
- Platform: Microsoft Windows
- Release: KOR: late 2018; NA: Summer 2019
- Genre: MMORPG
- Mode: Multiplayer

Astellia (sometimes known as Astellia Online) was a massively multiplayer online role-playing game developed by Korean Studio 8.

== Development and release ==
Astellia was developed by Studio 8. It was announced in 2016 at G-Star.

It was originally released in Korean in late 2018. It launched in summer 2019 in North America. Publisher Barunson released the game free-to-play in Korea and buy-to-play in the West. The game is a high fantasy MMORPG that uses a system of summonable companions called Astels. The player can summon an Astel to complement their weaknesses or strengthen their own power. The Astels are collectable in-game.

Barunson abandoned the game by April 2020 and gave it back to developer studio to found a new publisher. New version of the game called Astellia Royal was released as free-to-play in Steam March 2021. Game service (both western versions) was terminated in October 2021.

The game was rerereleased in west as a NFT game called Astel of Atra in December 2022. In this version of the game the Astels are tradeable NFTs stored in Polygon blockchain. Players can earn cryptocurrency in game, but they need to own an Astel NFT to obtain it. It's one of the first play-to-earn blockchain/cryptocurrency titles released (along with other Korean MMORPG title MIR4 of The Legend of Mir series). Astel of Atra was shut down Feb 10th 2023.

== Sequel ==
Sesisoft released Astellia M on 14 October 2025 for Windows, iOS, and Android. Nexus announced in July 2026 Astellia M will be available on the company's blockchain game platform One.
