= Natus Vincere =

Ukraine-based esports organisation

- Nickname: Black and Yellow; NAVINATION
- Short name: NAVI
- Games: Brawl Stars; Counter-Strike 2; Dota 2; League of Legends; Mobile Legends: Bang Bang; PUBG: Battlegrounds; VALORANT; Fatal Fury: City of the Wolves; Chess
- Founded: 17 December 2009; 16 years ago
- Location: Kyiv, Ukraine (HQ); Berlin, Germany
- Colors: Black and Yellow
- Owner: Founder: Oleksandr "ZeroGravity" Kokhanovskyi; CEO: Yevhen "HarisPilton" Zolotarov; Owner: Maksym Krippa
- Partners: GG.BET; Logitech G; RedBull; Napster; VISA; Saucony; Limitless; white market; Backforce; PrivatBank
- Website: navi.gg

Natus Vincere (Latin for "born to win"), commonly referred to by the abbreviated name NAVI (formerly Na`Vi), is an Ukrainian esports organization based in Kyiv. Founded in 2009, the organization has teams and players competing in various games, such as Counter-Strike 2, Dota 2, FIFA, Brawl Stars, World of Tanks, Paladins, PlayerUnknown's Battlegrounds, Clash of Clans, Apex Legends, Rainbow Six Siege, Mobile Legends: Bang Bang, Fortnite, VALORANT, and League of Legends. NAVI's VALORANT team is currently a partnered member of VCT EMEA, while their MLBB division is a franchised team in MPL Indonesia and their League division is a franchised team in the League of Legends EMEA Championship (LEC).

== Counter-Strike division ==
=== History ===
==== 2009: Formation ====
In October 2009, Murat "Arbalet" Zhumashevich declared the creation of an esports organization during the Intel Extreme Masters tournament being held in Dubai. He was to provide the finances required to run the organization and also provide a place for players to train in, while starix, a Counter-Strike professional player, took up the duty of creating a lineup for the organization.

On 17 December 2009, Natus Vincere, at the time with the name of Arbalet UA, was formed, based around their Counter-Strike team, which consisted of players Ioann "Edward" Sukharev, Yegor "markeloff" Markelov, Sergey "starix" Ischuk, Arsenij "ceh9" Trinozhenko and Danylo "Zeus" Teslenko, with ZeroGravity taking the position of manager.

The abbreviation Na'Vi was inspired by the film Avatar, with its full form being decided by the fans through a competition.

==== 2010: Multiple championships ====
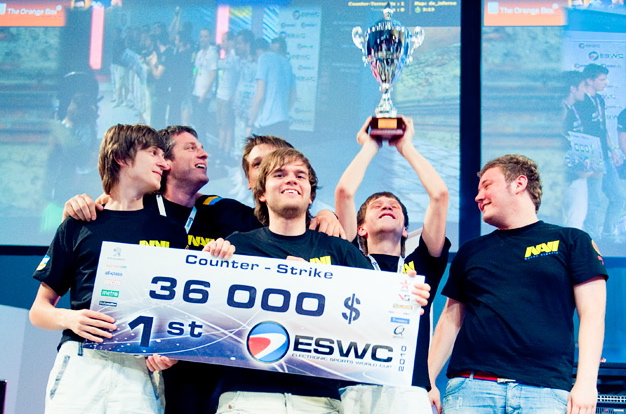
Na'Vi winning ESWC 2010

After a poor performance at the Arbalet Cup CIS 2010 (4th place), Markeloff, the team's top player, decided to skip the next big tournament, ASUS Winter 2010, so that the team could prepare for the Arbalet Cup and the Ukrainian qualifications for the ESWC.

In the middle of May 2010, Na'Vi took 2nd place in the prestigious Arbalet Cup Europe 2010 in Stockholm, losing to Fnatic in the finals and earning $10,000 in prize money.

Na'Vi finally gained victory at ESWC Ukraine.

In the final part of the ESWC, the team hit the highest seeding, along with SK Gaming, Fnatic, and mTw.dk.

On 4 July 2010, Natus Vincere achieved the highest accolade in the history of Ukrainian e-Sports, winning the ESWC (which previously could not be reached by any CIS team), defeating SK Gaming in the finals: 16:5 (de_train) and 16:4 (de_inferno).

During the tournament Na'Vi passed through the group stage thanks to fortune, but got outplayed by Fnatic and mTw.dk in the playoffs.

After being victorious in the world championship, Natus Vincere announced their participation in 2 more tournaments—Arbalet Cup Dallas and GameGune 2010 (Bilbao). On 18 July 2010, Na'Vi won Arbalet Cup Dallas beating Mousesports in the final match: 19:15 (de_dust2), 16:12 (de_inferno).

After receiving $25,000, Na'Vi took the first place in quantity of prize money earned by European teams that year.

Na'Vi took 3rd place in GameGune 2010 and Intel Extreme Masters Shanghai.

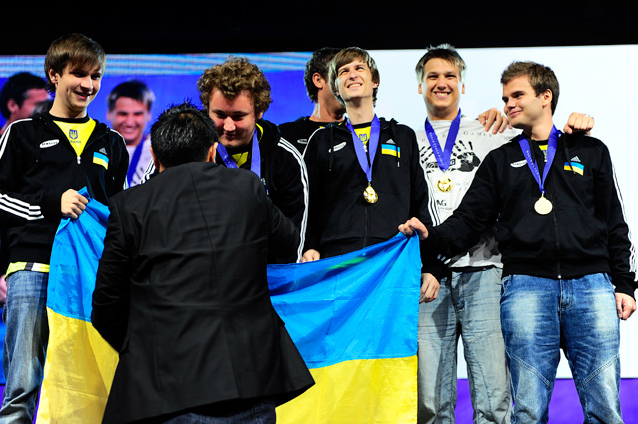
Na'Vi winning World Cyber Games 2010

On 15 August, Na'Vi won the Ukrainian qualifications for the 2010 World Cyber Games and received a paid voucher to the finals in Los Angeles from 30 September to 3 October 2010.

The next tournament for Na'Vi was ASUS Summer 2010, to which the team received a direct invitation. This tournament became first in the ASUS Open series, which was held at Kyiv gaming center "Kyiv CyberSport Arena". In the semi-finals Na'Vi lost to Kazakh team k23 and as a result took the 3rd place.

On 4 October 2010, Natus Vincere became the World Cyber Games world champions by defeating Danish team mTw.dk in the finals. This victory made Na'Vi the first team in the world which had managed to hold the three most prestigious championship titles at once (IEM, ESWC, WCG).

At the end of October 2010, ESL TV commentator Bakr "KinGSaicx" Fadl proclaimed that SK Gaming was going to invite the Ukrainian team to take place of its Swedish squad, but the manager of Natus Vincere declined this information.

In early November 2010 Natus Vincere took part in the World e-Sports Masters tournament (WEM 2010), which annually gathers the best teams from all over the world in the Chinese city of Hangzhou. Among the eight participants of the tournament, Na’Vi took 4th place as well as $7,500.

From the 25th to the 27 November 2010, in the Swedish city of Jönköping the largest LAN party in the world took place—DreamHack Winter 2010. To go to this tournament, Natus Vincere had to skip a major Russian tournament, ASUS Autumn 2010, since it was coinciding with DreamHack's dates. After finishing the group stage Na'Vi consistently outplayed teams puta, Fnatic, Frag Executors, and mTw.dk in the finals, winning the tournament.

During the four playoff matches the Ukrainians lost only one time to Fnatic on the new map—de_mirage. "Starix" (Serhiy Ischuk) received the tournament's MVP award.

After winning DreamHack Winter 2010, the team established a new record: winning $220,000 in one year.

The previous record belonged to Swedish team Fnatic, who earned $189,000 in 2009 (before that, the record was held by Swedish team SK Gaming with earnings of $183,000 in 2003).

In 2010, popular website HLTV.org had made rankings for the 20 best Counter-Strike players. Yegor "markeloff" Markelov was 1st place, Sergey "Starix" Ischuk 4th, Ioann "Edward" Sukharev 5th, and the captain of Na'Vi, Daniil "Zeus" Teslenko had 19th place, as well as "The best captain of the year".

==== 2011 ====
On 5 March 2011, Na'Vi defended their position in Hannover as the champions of the Intel Extreme Masters and earned $35,000. They defeated Polish team Frag Executors in the finals: 16:12 (de_train) and 16:10 (de_dust2).

$4,550 of the prize money was deducted (13% of the total) as a penalty for breaking the rules.

==== 2015 ====
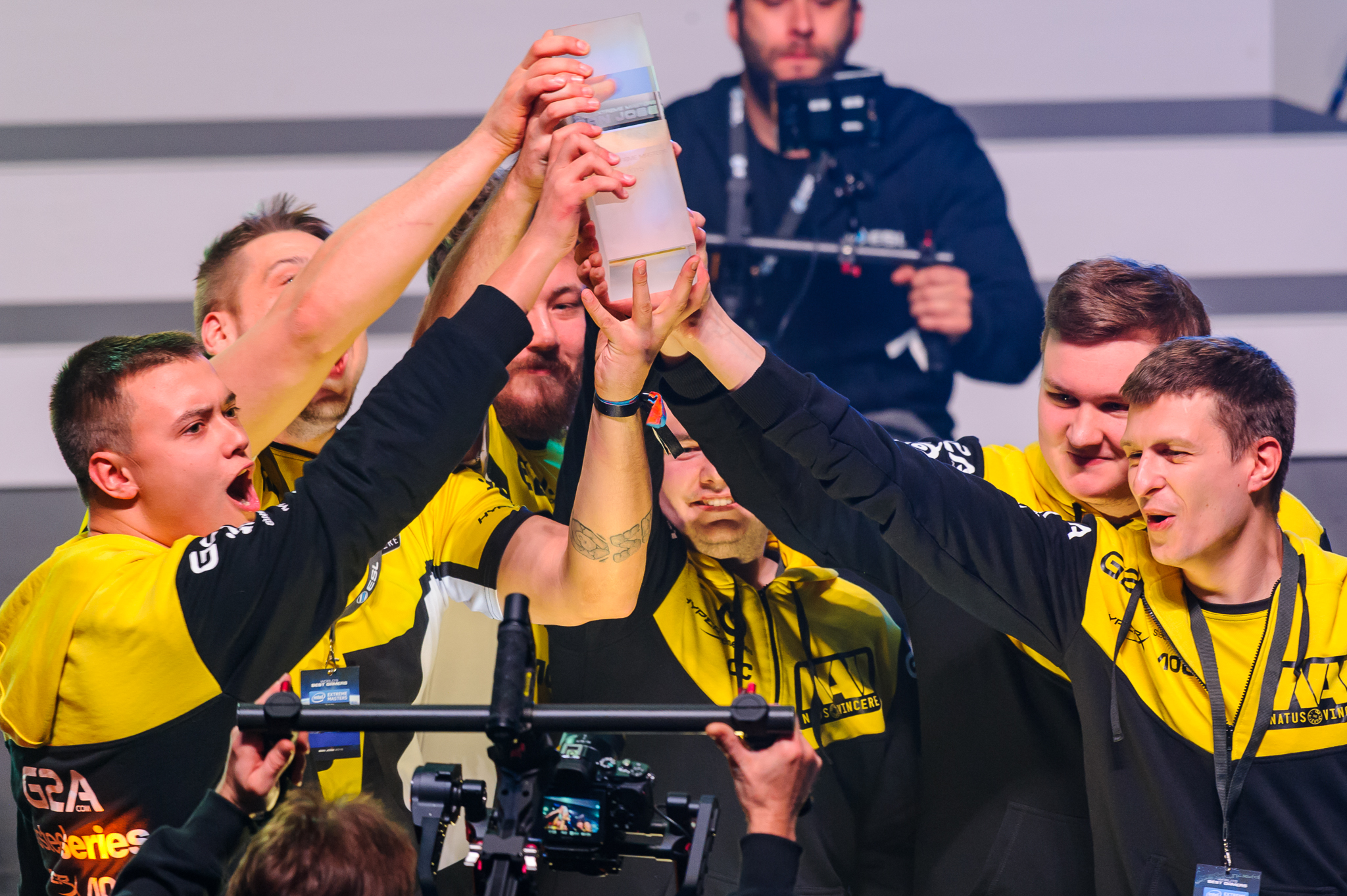
Natus Vincere won IEM San Jose 2015.

Na'Vi reached the finals of DreamHack Open Cluj-Napoca 2015 where they were beat 0–2 by Team EnVyUs. Na'Vi won Intel Extreme Masters Season X - San Jose after beating Team SoloMid (Now Astralis) in the grand finals 2–0.

==== 2016 ====
Na'Vi had a successful year in 2016, starting with their victory over Luminosity Gaming (now MiBR) at DreamHack Leipzig 2016 on 22 January.

They followed up with a 3rd–4th place finish at the Intel Extreme Masters Season X – World Championship and a second-place finish at MLG Columbus 2016, where they lost to Luminosity in the finals. On 17 April, they placed second at DreamHack Masters Malmö 2016.

Later, on 22 May, Na'Vi secured a second-place finish at the StarLadder i-League Invitational #1, losing to Virtus.pro in the finals. They achieved a 5th–8th place finish at ESL One Cologne 2016 and a 3rd–4th place finish at ELeague Season 1 on 29 July 2.

On 4 August, Oleksandr "s1mple" Kostyliev joined the active roster, replacing Daniil "Zeus" Teslenko.

Finally, on 22 September, Na'Vi became the champions of ESL One: New York 2016, defeating Virtus.pro in the finals.

==== 2017 ====
On 10 March, team coach starix stepped down from his role in the team. He is replaced by team analyst Andrey "Andi" Prokhorov.

On 28 July, Denis "seized" Kostin and Ladislav "GuardiaN" Kovács stepped down from Natus Vincere.

On 9 August, Mykhailo "Kane" Blagin was brought in and seized and Zeus returned.

On 6 November, Na'Vi brought in Denis "electronic" Sharipov in place of seized who stepped down from the roster.

==== 2018 ====
On 8 July, Na'Vi ended up winning ESL One Cologne 2018 over BIG 3–1.

==== 2019 ====
On 9 September, Na'Vi announced that Zeus would retire after BLAST Pro Series Moscow 2019. He retired on 14 September.

On 20 September, Na'Vi acquired GuardiaN from FaZe Clan and Andrey "B1ad3" Gorodenskiy joined as a coach. GuardiaN later stepped down and was replaced by Perfecto.

==== 2021 ====
On 12 September, Na'Vi became the 3rd team ever to complete the Intel Grand Slam after winning IEM Katowice 2020, IEM Cologne 2021, DreamHack Masters Spring 2021 and ESL Pro League Season 14.

On 7 November they won their first CS:GO Major, PGL Stockholm 2021, defeating G2 Esports 2–0. Team Na'Vi placed 1st at BLAST Premier Fall Final 2021 and BLAST Premier World Final 2021.

Na'Vi also cooperated with Hator, producer of gamers oriented computer equipment, in coorganizing esport events in 22 cities of Ukraine.

==== 2022 ====
They proceeded to qualify for the Blast Spring Final and made it to the playoffs of IEM Katowice 2022, being favored to win the event.

On 1 March 2022, following the Russian invasion of Ukraine, Natus Vincere cut ties with their holding company, Russian esports conglomerate ESForce, saying that the company "publicly denies the horror that is now happening in Ukraine."

Na'Vi CEO Yevhen Zolotarov stated his hope "that we are going to keep this roster and that the Russia-based players are going to relocate."

After qualifying to the Legends stage for the PGL Major Antwerp 2022 through the Europe Regional Major Rankings they proceeded to go 3–0 in that stage, beating G2, BIG, and NIP.

They defeated Heroic 2–1 in the quarterfinals and ENCE 2–0 in the semifinals for their fifth major finals appearance. FaZe Clan won 2–0 for their first major victory.

On 28 May, Boombl4 was removed from the active roster. The organization said his removal was "related to high reputational risks for the club, and it is not the result of his game." Na'Vi COO Oleksii "xaoc" Kucherov said that the other two Russian players, electronic and Perfecto, were relocating.

Viktor "sdy" Orudzhev was brought in as a replacement for Boombl4 for Blast Premier Spring Final in Lisbon, and electronic became IGL. His continued play for Na'Vi "depends on his performance in the upcoming tournament". Na'Vi went on to win the event, beating Team Vitality in a dominant 2–0 in the final. Following this success, sdy continued being the fifth player for IEM Cologne.

While FaZe and Na'Vi had been the only teams occupying the HLTV #1 spot during the 2022 season, IEM Cologne 2022 had many viable contenders. Many teams had a so-called "stand-in buff" during 2022, where many teams had success after introducing a stand-in or new player. Whether or not Na'Vi could continue after their success with their new player and IGL was uncertain. FaZe had dipped in form after the Antwerp Major, ENCE has been a playoff contender but had not lifted trophies, Cloud9 had won IEM Dallas and BIG had won Roobet Cup.

The quarter-finals were filled with unexpected contenders but the semifinal contenders were occupied by the top 2 teams, FaZe and Na'Vi. Both teams won 2–0 in the semifinals to set up the grand final to "decide who the number one team is".

In a very close 2–3 finish, FaZe came out on top.

The second half of 2022 started with Blast Premier Fall Groups 2022. NAVI Junior AWPer headtr1ck stood in for s1mple for the group stage, who could not be in Copenhagen for personal reasons. They lost the opening game to Complexity but won successfully went through the lower bracket to win their group. They then qualified for the Blast Fall Final with a 2–0 victory over Vitality.

==== 2023 ====
NAVI qualified to the Legends Stage of the Blast Paris Major 2023, where they failed to make it to the playoffs after being eliminated by FaZe Clan.

On 30 June, NAVI announced a new international roster made up of Finnish in-game leader Aleksi "Aleksib" Virolainen, Lithuanian Justinas "jL" Lekavičius, and Romanian Mihai "iM" Ivan playing alongside s1mple and b1t, following the benchings of npl, Perfecto and electronic. Npl transferred to Ukrainian organization B8 on 9 July. On 14 July, Cloud9 confirmed the signings of Perfecto and electronic.

On 26 October, s1mple announced his intention to take a break from competitive play. His place on the active roster was replaced by Ihor "w0nderful" Zhdanov on 31 October.

==== 2024 ====
On 19 February, it was announced that s1mple had returned to professional Counter-Strike, with a one-month loan to Saudi Arabian organization Team Falcons.

On 31 March, NAVI won the first CS2 Major Championship tournament, beating FaZe Clan 2-1 in the finals of the PGL CS2 Major Copenhagen 2024. Justinas "jL" Lekavičius was named the Most Valuable Player.

Following their major win, NAVI finished 9th-12th at ESL Pro League Season 19 and IEM Dallas 2024. They proceeded to appear at six consecutive grand finals, winning 3 of the events: BLAST Premier Spring Final 2024, losing to Team Spirit 1-3; Esports World Cup 2024, beating G2 2-1; IEM Cologne 2024, losing to Vitality 1-3; ESL Pro League Season 20, beating Eternal Fire 3-2; BLAST Premier Fall Final 2024, losing to G2 1-3; and IEM Rio 2024, beating MOUZ 3-1.

NAVI was named the HLTV Team of the Year of 2024.

=== Current roster ===
Natus Vincere Counter-Strike 2 roster
Players
Coaches

| Handle | Name | Nationality |
|---|---|---|
| Aleksib | Virolainen, Aleksi | Finland |
| iM | Ivan, Mihai | Romania |
| b1t | Vakhovskiy, Valeriy | Ukraine |
| w0nderful | Zhdanov, Ihor | Ukraine |
| makazze | Shaqiri, Drin | Kosovo |

Head coach

- Andrey "B1ad3" Gorodenskiy

Legend:
- (I) Inactive
- (S) Suspended
- Substitute
- (injured) Injury / Illness

Latest roster transaction: 1 July 2026.

NAVI Junior Counter-Strike 2 roster
Players
Coaches

| Handle | Name | Nationality |
|---|---|---|
| FAZERY | Procházka, David | Czech Republic |
| yoki | Istomin, Danil | Ukraine |
| kodak | Buchma, Nazar | Ukraine |
| MahaR | Horáček, Samuel | Czech Republic |
| skizzyee | Novkovikj, Novica | North Macedonia |

Head coach

- Michał "snatchie" Rudzki

Legend:
- (I) Inactive
- (S) Suspended
- Substitute
- (injured) Injury / Illness

Latest roster transaction: 31 March 2026.

== Dota division ==
=== History ===
In October 2010, the creation of a Defence of the Ancients (DotA) squad was announced, which included the best Ukrainian players. Initially the team was composed of Aleksandr "XBOCT" Dashkevych, Artur "Goblak" Kostenko, Bogdan "Axypa" Boychuk, Oleksandr "Deff" Stepaniuc, and Andriy "Mag~" Chipenko. However, in December 2010, Mag~ and Deff- left the team. The empty slots on the team were filled by Ukrainian players from DTS.Chatrix—Danil "Dendi" Ishutin, and Ivan "Artstyle" Antonov, who became the captain of this new squad.

A roster change on 17 June 2011, resulted in the replacements of Goblak and Axypa with Clement "Puppey" Ivanov and Dmitriy "LighTofHeaveN" Kupriyanov. In August 2011, Na'Vi was invited to The International, the first in a series of annual Dota 2 tournaments. The event featured 16 of the top teams from all over the world with an impressive amount of prize money—$1,600,000. Na'Vi was the ultimate winner, beating Chinese team EHOME 3–1 in the grand finals and winning a cash prize of $1,000,000.

On 13 October 2011, shortly after their victory, Artstyle left the team. The captain position was taken up by Puppey, and Sergey "ARS-ART" Revin, from Russian team Moscow Five, took the fifth slot on the roster.

2012 was a very successful season for Na'Vi as they won multiple tournaments throughout the year, including four consecutive seasons of Star Ladder's Star Series, the premier tournament for the CIS region.

At The International 2012, Na'Vi attempted to defend their title where they ultimately placed 2nd, losing to the Chinese team Invictus Gaming 1–3 in the grand finals.

At the end of February 2013, ARS-ART was replaced by Gleb "Funn1k" Lipatnikov from Russian squad Team Empire. Kuro "KuroKy" Salehi Takhasomi from Mousesports also joined the team, while LighTofHeaveN went inactive. In April 2013, after his contract expired, LighTofHeaveN officially left for Team Empire. In June 2013, Na'Vi announced an all female squad.

The first half of 2013 was difficult for Na'Vi as they struggled to gain a footing in major tournaments with their new lineup. Their first major tournament win was against RoX.KIS at the first season of the ESL Major Series One in April. In July, Na'Vi competed against 9 of the best Eastern teams at the Alienware Cup. They defeated LGD Gaming.cn 3–2 in the grand finals, and became one of the few Western teams to win a major Chinese tournament.

In August 2013, Na'Vi once again reached the Grand Finals of The International 2013, but they lost 2–3 in a very close fifth game against the Swedish team Alliance.

In July 2014, Na'Vi was knocked out in the lower bracket knockout phase of The International by Cloud9, placing at 7/8th place and earning $519,208. This would be the first time Na'Vi would not make it to the Grand Finals of The International. Many fans attributed this to a lack of adaptation and even went as far to mark it as an end of an era. Soon after this, Kuro "KuroKy" Salehi Takhasomi and Clement "Puppey" Ivanov left the team.

On 13 February 2015, Gleb "Funn1k" Lipatnikov retired from the Na'Vi Dota 2 team.

On 4 March 2015, DkPhobos joined Na'Vi, replacing Funn1k.

On 9 March 2015, DkPhobos left Na'Vi to rejoin ASUS.Polar.

On 25 March 2015, Goblak left Na'Vi with SoNNeikO taking his spot.

On 5 April 2015, Na'Vi announced the return of Funn1k and ArtStyle with VANSKOR moving to reserve after battling a long-term illness.

On 27 August 2015, Na'Vi announced the departure of captain Ivan "Artstyle" Antonov following a disappointing finish at The International 2015.

On 2 September 2015, Artstyle returned, but as a substitute. The main roster spot was filled by acquiring M.Batbileg "Ra", and the second substitute spot was filled by Ilnur "Kudes" Khafizov.

On 16 October 2015, Na`Vi announced the disband of their main roster.

On 19 October 2015, Na`Vi posted on their website that Danil "Dendi" Ishutin and Akbar "SoNNeikO" Butaev will pick out the remaining 3 players for a new Na`Vi roster.

On 23 February 2016, Na'Vi's new team was finalized with the team moving forward in the Dota Pit tournament after a disappointing defeat in the final qualifying round for ESL Manila.

On 3 September 2018, Danil "Dendi" Ishutin noted that he was looking for a new team and players for that team, signaling his departure as team captain of Na'Vi's DOTA 2 team.

On 25 March 2021, Na'Vi's DOTA 2 team decided to withdraw from the One Esports' Singapore Major tournament due to COVID-19.

On 2 September 2021, Na'Vi announced a new roster managed and coached by ArtStyle. It includes Alexey "Solo" Berezin, Ilya "ALOHADANCE" Korobkin and Victor "GeneRaL" Nigrini. Vladimir "No[o]ne" Minenko and Alik "V-Tune" Vorobei retained their places in the team.

Results of DPC EEU 2023 Tour 1: Division I: NAVI are relegated to the second division

=== Current roster ===
Natus Vincere Dota 2 roster
Players
Coaches

| Handle | Name | Nationality |
|---|---|---|
| gotthejuice | Linnikov, Taras | Ukraine |
| NiKU | Bachkur, Artem | Ukraine |
| pma | Prots, Yurii | Ukraine |
| Daze | Tokpanov, Tamir | Kyrgyzstan |
| Riddys | Mitroshkyn, Stanislav | Ukraine |

Head coach

Aske "Cy-" Larsen

Legend:
- (I) Inactive
- (S) Suspended
- Substitute
- (injured) Injury / Illness

Latest roster transaction: 09-27-2026.

=== Tournament result ===
| Tournament | Location | Date | Placement | Prize money |
|---|---|---|---|---|
| IEM 4 European Finals | Germany, Cologne | 15–17 January 2010 | 1st | $1,250 |
| Arbalet Asia | Kazakhstan, Almaty | 30–31 January 2010 | 1st | $10,000 |
| IEM 4 World Championship Finals | Germany, Hannover | 3 April 2010 | 1st | $50,000 |
| Arbalet Cup Best of Four | Ukraine, Kyiv | 9–11 April 2010 | 1st | $12,000 |
| Arbalet Cup Europe | Sweden, Stockholm | 14–16 May 2010 | 2nd | $10,000 |
| Arbalet Cup Dallas 2010 | United States, Dallas | 16–18 July 2010 | 1st | $25,000 |
| Fragnet Summer Tour 2012 | Bosnia and Herzegovina, Sarajevo | 25–26 August 2012 | 3rd | $500 |
| Extreme Masters: Shanghai | China, Shanghai | 29 July – 1 August 2010 | 3rd | $5,000 |
| ASUS Summer 2010 | Ukraine, Kyiv | 28–29 August 2010 | 3rd | $3,000 |
| Dreamhack Winter 2010 | Sweden, Jönköping | 25–27 November 2010 | 1st | $28,200 |
| Intel Challenge Super Cup 7 | Ukraine, Kyiv | 19–20 March 2011 | 1st | $5,000 |
| OSPL Spring 2011 | Kazakhstan, Almaty | 3 April 2011 | 1st | $5,500 |
| ASUS Spring 2011 | Ukraine, Kyiv | 28–29 May 2011 | 1st | $4,430 |
| DreamHack Summer 2011 | Sweden, Jönköping | 18–20 June 2011 | 1st | $1,600 |
| Adepto BH Open | Bosnia, Sarajevo | 24–26 June 2011 | 1st | $7,500 |
| GameGune 2011 | Spain, Bilbao | 22–24 July 2011 | 1st | $4,000 |
| ASUS Summer 2011 | Ukraine, Kyiv | 13–14 August 2011 | 1st | $1,000 |
| The International 2011 | Germany, Cologne | 17–21 August 2011 | 1st | $1,000,000 |
| e-STARS Seoul 2011 | South Korea, Seoul | 19–21 August 2011 | 3rd | $9,200 |
| SEC 2011 | Poland, Warsaw | 6–9 October 2011 | 1st | $10,000 |
| ESWC 2011 | France, Paris | 21–23 October 2011 | 1st | $6,000 |
| DreamHack Winter 2011 | Sweden, Jönköping | 24–27 November 2011 | 1st | $4,275 |
| IEM 6 Global Challenge Kyiv | Ukraine, Kyiv | 19–22 January 2012 | 1st | $16,000 |
| IEM 6 World Championship Finals | Germany, Hanover | 6–10 March 2012 | 1st | $20,000 |
| TECHLABS Cup 2012 | Russia, Moscow | 17–18 March 2012 | 1st | $10,000 |
| Copenhagen Games 2012 | Denmark, Copenhagen | 4–8 April 2012 | 1st | $6,200 |
| DreamHack Summer 2012 | Sweden, Jönköping | 16–19 June 2012 | 1st | $3,600 |
| The International 2012 | United States, Seattle | 31 August – 2 September 2012 | 2nd | $250,000 |
| Pro Gamer Series Exponor 2012 | Portugal, Porto | 10–14 October 2012 | 1st | €4,000 |
| Alienware Cup | China, online | 16 June – 7 July 2013 | 1st | $25,000 |
| RaidCall Dota 2 League Season 3 | Spain, Valencia | 20 May – 21 July 2013 | 1st | $5,000 |
| The International 2013 | United States, Seattle | 7–11 August 2013 | 2nd | $632,370 |
| DreamHack Winter 2013 | Sweden, Jönköping | 28 Nov – 1 December 2013 | 1st | $25,000 |
| SLTV Star Series Season 8 | Ukraine, Kyiv | 25 November 2013 – 19 January 2014 | 1st | $62,000 |
| The International 2014 | United States, Seattle | 8 July 2014 – 21 July 2014 | 8th | $516,131 |
| The International 2015 | United States, Seattle | 3 August 2015 – 8 August 2015 | 15th | $55,289 |
| IEM Season X - San Jose | United States, San Jose | 21 November 2015 – 22 November 2015 | 1st | $115,000 |
| SL i-League StarSeries Season 2 | United States, Los Angeles | 21–24 July 2016 | 1st | $135,000 |

== League of Legends ==
=== Current roster ===
Natus Vincere League of Legends roster
Players
Coaches

| Role | Handle | Name | Nationality |
|---|---|---|---|
| Top | Maynter | Sorokin, Volodymyr | Ukraine |
| Jungle | Rhilech | Uçan, Enes | Turkey |
| Mid | Poby | Yoon Sung-won | South Korea |
| Bot | SamD | Lee Jae-hoon | South Korea |
| Support | Parus | Çiçek, Polat Furkan | Turkey |
| Mid | Larssen (I) | Larsson, Emil | Sweden |

Head coach

- Vasilis "TheRock" Voltis

Assistant coach(es)

- Adrien "GotoOne" Picard
- Jorge "Lopon" López

Legend:
- (I) Inactive
- (S) Suspended
- Substitute
- (injured) Injury / Illness

Latest roster transaction: 13 January 2026.

== Mobile Legends: Bang Bang division ==
On 4 November 2021, the organization announced their entry into Mobile Legends: Bang Bang by signing the CIS roster Deus Vult before the M3 World Championship, the biggest tournament for the game. The roster would finish tied for 7th place, losing 2-3 to Malaysian team TODAK in the lower bracket. The team disbanded in 2022 having failed to qualify for M4, with most of the players returning to Deus Vult; the team was later signed by Team Spirit.

On 8 February 2025, NAVI announced that they would return to Mobile Legends, acquiring Rebellion Esports and their franchise slots in the MLBB Professional League Indonesia (MPL Indonesia) and MLBB Development League Indonesia (MDL Indonesia). On 14 May 2025, they would sign two women's rosters, one based in Malaysia and one in the Philippines, with the Filipino roster being the former Smart Omega Empress roster that won the prior year's Women's Invitational.

=== Current rosters ===
Natus Vincere MLBB (Main Team) roster
Players
Coaches

| Handle | Name | Nationality |
|---|---|---|---|
| EXP | Karss | Karsten William Tjugito | Indonesia |
| Jungle | Andoryuuu | Andrew Lew Flora | Philippines |
| Jungle | Joshuaa | Joshua Adonai Nathan Kurniawan | Indonesia |
| Middle | Jiizee | Muhammad Najiyyullah | Indonesia |
| Gold | Zeonn | Budi Liunardi | Indonesia |
| Roamer | APHRO | Muhammad Azzidan Marchiano | Indonesia |
| EXP | Febbb | Rio Wijaya | Indonesia |

Head coach

Anthony Dennis "YnoT" Senedrin

Assistant coach(es)

Hafizun "Jacklee" Ahmad

Legend:
- (I) Inactive
- (S) Suspended
- Substitute
- (injured) Injury / Illness

Latest roster transaction: 6 August 2026.

Natus Vincere MLBB (MDL Team) roster
Players
Coaches

| Handle | Name | Nationality |
|---|---|---|---|
| EXP | DAVIANNN | Davian Nurdiana | Indonesia |
| Jungle | Ren | Jeremy Rondonuwu | Indonesia |
| Middle | SuperPinzz | Moehammad Panji Noegraha | Indonesia |
| Gold | Kell | Michael Prawira | Indonesia |
| Roamer | Kazeemen | Yusquona Agtasya | Indonesia |

Head coach

Alanuari "Fluent" Wicaksono

Legend:
- (I) Inactive
- (S) Suspended
- Substitute
- (injured) Injury / Illness

Latest roster transaction: 7 March 2026.

Natus Vincere MLBB (Female Philippines) roster
Players
Coaches

| Handle | Name | Nationality |
|---|---|---|---|
| EXP | Ayanami | Gwyneth Berdin Diagon | Philippines |
| Jungle | Keishi | Kaye Maerylle Alpuerto | Philippines |
| Middle | Rain | Honey Jemlan Talagtag | Philippines |
| Gold | Rianne | Lhoureain Hadiyah Samon Alcaraz | Philippines |
| Roamer | Meraaay | Mery Christine Vivero | Philippines |

Head coach

Salman "KingSalman" Macarambon

Legend:
- (I) Inactive
- (S) Suspended
- Substitute
- (injured) Injury / Illness

Latest roster transaction: 14 April 2026.

== PlayerUnknown's Battlegrounds division ==
On 11 April 2018, the organization announced the acquisition of a PlayerUnknown's Battlegrounds (PUBG) team. It includes four Russian players: Vadim "POKAMOLODOY" Ulshin, Ivan "Ubah" Kapustin, Dmitry "Shade1" Roshchin and Svyatoslav "Drainys" Komissarov.

On 19 November 2018, a new PUBG team was announced.

In April 2019, after unsuccessful performance at the LAN-tournament of the PUBG Europe League, which was held in Berlin (NA’VI at the end of the first phase of the tournament took 14th place out of 16 teams), the management of the organization decided to renew the team. From the previous squad only Vadim «POKAMOLODOY» Ulshin remained, who, however, lost the status of team captain. Alexander "BatulinS" Batulin, Dmitry "Recrent" Osintsev and Artem "Sadovnik" Danilyuk were sent to "inactive".

On 1 October 2020, Natus Vincere signed a PUBG Mobile roster hence entering the PUBG Mobile Competitive Esports.

On 5 October 2020, they received an invitation to Peace Elite Championship which boasted a massive prizepool of $1.7 million.

On 26 October 2020, Na'Vi won the PUBG Mobile EMEA League and hence advanced to the PUBG Mobile Global Championship.

On 20 November 2022, Natus Vincere team won PUBG Global Championship 2022 and earned $1,008,338.

=== Current roster ===
Natus Vincere PUBG roster
Players
Coaches

| Handle | Name | Nationality |
|---|---|---|
| Mellman | Levkin, Konstantin | Georgia |
| alya | Pirogov, Aleksandr | Russia |
| xmpl | Adarkin, Artem | Russia |
| ubah | Kapustin, Ivan | Russia |

Head coach

- Vacant

Legend:
- (I) Inactive
- (S) Suspended
- Substitute
- (injured) Injury / Illness

Latest roster transaction: 21 November 2022.

== World of Tanks division ==
In July 2013 Russian–Ukrainian team Red Rush began competing under the Natus Vincere banner in World of Tanks.

Na'Vi won the first Wargaming.net League of World of Tanks in Warsaw, Poland in April 2014 and won it again in April 2016.

== Rainbow Six Siege division ==
Natus Vincere made an entrance into Rainbow Six Siege Pro League by acquiring the German roster of Mock-it E-sports in February 2019. The original Na'Vi Rainbow Six Siege roster was Pascal "Cry1NNN" Alouane, Lukas "Korey" Zwingmann, Jan "ripz" Hucke, Niklas "KS" Massierer, and Lasse "Lazzo" Klie. On 30 May 2019, the organisation announced that the Korey was to join another team and the rest of German roster had been released and Na'Vi would announce a new roster the following day.

On 1 June 2019, Na'Vi announced that they had signed on the British roster of MnM Gaming shortly after it had qualified for Pro League Season 10. The roster consisted of Ben "CTZN" MacMillan, Jack "Doki" Robertson, Luke "Kendrew" Kendrew, Leon "neLo" Pesić, Szymon "Saves" Kamieniak, and Ellis "GiG" Hindle as coach. On 11 October, Doki was banned by Ubisoft, the developers of the game, for severe toxicity and the ESL, the organizers of Pro League, chose to honor the ban and required NaVi to sign a stand-in for the duration of Doki's ban which lasts until 11 April 2020. Ellis "Pie" Pyart was announced as the stand-in for Doki four days later. With Pie, Na'Vi qualified for the Pro League Season 11 Finals, where they placed first and won $100,000. About a month after on 18 December, GiG left the roster and analyst Cyril "jahk" Renoud would be the team's acting coach. This roster would remain until after the Six Invitational 2020 in February 2020, when Pie and CTZN both left Na'Vi. On 13 March 2020, Byron "Blurr" Murray was announced as the stand-in for the remainder of Doki's ban. On 21 March, Dimitri "Panix" de Longeaux joined the team as a permanent player.

=== Current roster ===
Natus Vincere Rainbow Six Siege roster
Players
Coaches

| Handle | Name | Nationality |
|---|---|---|
| Nathan | Sharp, Nathan | United Kingdom |
| Kayak | Morley, Jordan | United Kingdom |
| Skiddy | Diamond, Jamie | United Kingdom |
| Leadr | Fortunado, Jake | United Kingdom |
| T3b | Treglia, Edoardo | Italy |

Head coach

- Alonso "Alo" Díez

Legend:
- (I) Inactive
- (S) Suspended
- Substitute
- (injured) Injury / Illness

Latest roster transaction: 5 October 2022.

=== Notable achievements ===
| End date | Tournament | Location | Placement | Prize |
(United Kingdom) British Roster
| 2019-07-04 | ESL Premiership Summer 2019 Group Stage | United Kingdom and Ireland | 1st | Finals |
| 2019-07-07 | Dreamhack Valencia 2019 | Valencia, Spain | 9–12th | $0 |
| 2019-07-27 | ESL Premiership Summer 2019 Finals | Leicester, United Kingdom | 1st | $5,488 |
| 2019-10-14 | Pro League Season 10 EU | Europe | 1st | Finals |
| 2019-11-09 | Pro League Season 10 Finals | Tokoname, Japan | 1st | $100,000 |
| 2019-11-13 | ESL Premiership Winter 2019 Group Stage | United Kingdom and Ireland | 2nd | Finals |
| 2019-11-23 | ESL Premiership Winter 2019 Finals | Manchester, United Kingdom | 1st | $10,268 |
| 2020-02-16 | Six Invitational 2020 | Montreal, Quebec, Canada | 9–12th | $80,000 |
| 2020-04-13 | Pro League Season 11 EU | Europe | 4th | $16,000 |
| 2020-06-07 | European Open Clash | Europe | 3–4th | $0 |
| 2020-07-20 | European League Season 1 – Stage 1 | Europe | 5th | $4,497 |
(Germany) Former German Roster
| 2019-04-26 | Pro League Season 9 EU | Europe | 8th | $3,000 |
| 2019-05-15 | Twitch Rivals 2 – Europe | Europe | 2nd | $4,250 |

== Valorant division ==
Natus Vincere signed No Pressure on 16 July 2021, marking their entrance into Valorant.

Natus Vincere VALORANT roster
Players
Coaches

| Handle | Name | Nationality |
|---|---|---|
| ANGE1 | Karasov, Kyrylo | Ukraine |
| Shao | Kiprsky, Andrey | Russia |
| Alexiiik | Hawlasek, Alex | Czech Republic |
| hiro | Kat, Emirhan | Netherlands |
| Ruxic | Güç, Uğur | Turkey |

Head coach

- Vincent "Happy" Schopenhauer

Legend:
- (I) Inactive
- (S) Suspended
- Substitute
- (injured) Injury / Illness

Latest roster transaction: 26 June 2025.

== Contribution to the development of esports ==
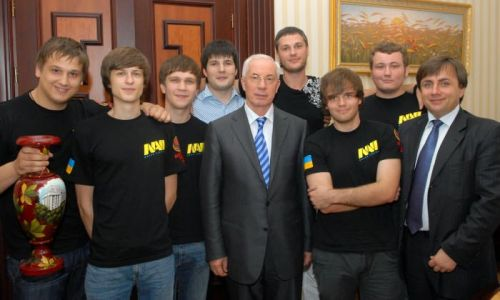
Na'Vi and former prime minister of Ukraine Mykola Azarov

Na'Vi's Counter-Strike team was the first in history to win three premier tournaments—Intel Extreme Masters, Electronic Sports World Cup, and World Cyber Games 2010—in one calendar year. Their Dota 2 squad won The International 2011, becoming the most successful esports organization at the time.

In July 2010, Prime Minister of Ukraine Mykola Azarov met the team in the Cabinet of Ministers building in Kyiv. During the meeting issues pertaining to the development of the IT industry in Ukraine were discussed. The Prime Minister promised to hold the esports International Open Cup of Ukraine in 2011. Ukrainian players were enrolled in to the so-called "Gold Reserve", enlisting the support of the government.

In 2024, Na'Vi donated the organization's portion of the prize money they earned winning the PGL Major Copenhagen 2024, totaling US$125,000, to support the use of unmanned ground vehicles in the Ukrainian armed forces during the Russian invasion of Ukraine.

NAVI are members of the Esports World Cup Foundation Club Support Program, funded by Saudi Arabia's Public Investment Fund, which gives teams monetary rewards for painting the Esports World Cup tournament series in a positive light and driving engagement to the tournament.

Awards and achievements
| Preceded by Inaugural | The International winner 2011; With: Artstyle, Dendi, XBOCT, Puppey, LighTofHeaveN, and McDee (coach) | Succeeded by Invictus Gaming |
| Preceded by StarLadder Major: Berlin 2019; Astralis | PGL Major Stockholm 2021 winner 2021 | Succeeded by PGL Major Antwerp 2022; FaZe Clan |
| Preceded by BLAST Paris Major 2023; Team Vitality | PGL CS2 Major Copenhagen 2024 winner 2024 | Succeeded by Perfect World Shanghai Major 2024; Team Spirit |
