= The Legend of Mir 2 =

2001 video game

Legend of Mir 2
- Developer(s): WeMade Entertainment; ActozSoft
- Publisher(s): Digital Bros; Shanda; Gamepot; Softworld
- Platform(s): Windows
- Release: (Italy) (South Korea) (China) 19 September 2001 (United States) May 2009
- Genre(s): Fantasy MMORPG
- Mode(s): Multiplayer

The Legend of Mir 2 (Korean: 미르의 전설 2) is a sprite-based isometric 3-D massively multiplayer online role-playing game developed by Korean-based WeMade Entertainment. There are currently two versions available: Korean and Chinese. The European version (published by Game Network) came to a close on 31 March 2009, after running for 8 years, and the North American version (published by Gamepot) came to a close on 14 May 2012.

Whilst being moderately successful in Europe, it has been well received in Asia and was the most popular MMORPG in China in 2002 and 2003, with over 250,000 simultaneous users being reported. The game has also claimed to have 120 million players worldwide.

The sequel, The Legend of Mir 3, has a similar gameplay but has updated graphics, as well as providing larger maps. It has not quite reached the popularity levels of its predecessor and has so far been released in the same countries as Mir 2, as well as in North America.

== Gameplay ==
=== Characters ===
Players have the option of playing one of four professions, with no more than three characters per server. Professions range from Taoist, healers who use magical and melee attacks. This is the support class of mir and not suited to solo game play. Taoists can summon pets to assist in battle, poison targets and heal. Warriors, who are the "tanks" of Mir use melee attacks and have the highest defense and attack attributes of all classes. Wizards depend on magic and can kill multiple monsters with ease using AoE spells. Wizards have low health and defense against physical damage and are especially weak against higher level warrior magic attacks. Assassins have taken over as the primary melee damage dealing class but have much weaker defense attributes than warriors. Conversely this instead of undermining the warrior class, has strengthened its position and clarified its role as the 'tank'.

=== PK/PVP ===
Players are allowed to attack and kill other players ingame for any given reason, though it is generally frowned upon. Once a player has killed another player they are labeled with either yellow or later, red, that informs other players that they have killed somebody recently. Red players are not allowed in most cities and are generally ignored by NPC's. Red players are also fair game to other players, a punishment for their PK status.

Another punishment is the chance of having one's weapon cursed by killing another player. Curses cause weapons to deal less of a melee blow. Increased number of curses will render a weapon useless.

While attacking another player, the attacker will be labeled with a Brown player name. Any other player can attack and kill the offending player without accumulating PK points.

=== Point System ===
Players are labeled with a PK status after successfully killing another player. Each kill is considered 100 PK points. One point is removed every minute. The point system consists of:

- 0-99 points - the player continues to have a white character name, even though the character still has PK points.
- 100-199 points - the player's name will turn yellow, a symbol that the player has killed somebody recently.
- 200 and above - the player's name will be red, showing that the player has killed at least Two people. While red the player can be killed without any ill effect to the attacking player. Red players will lose almost all of their bag when dying. Some players joined guilds specific to player killing, resulting in characters that could spend months if not years waiting for their PK points to expire.

Any towns that are guarded by a Guard, Archer Guard or a Town Archer will attack any red named player on sight. This stops any red named players from entering towns, or if they're already in the town it decreases their safe areas dramatically. The damage caused by a guard or archer is considerably high, requiring only a few strikes to take down even the highest level character.

== History ==
=== European Mir ===
The Italian games company Game Network (originally owned by Digital Bros) was responsible for the operation of the European version of the game. Game Network originally had their own satellite television channel (which also has a dedicated show to it, Me in Mir), but was later closed in 2005 (in Italy) and 2006 (in UK) due to lack of funding.

In January 2006, gwyl, who played on the Phoenix server, became the first player to reach the level 50 milestone and has a statue of his character erected in the game.

In the 2007 yearly review and the September quarterly review, Digital Bros made it clear that they not only intended to replace The Legend of Mir 2 but also another MMORPG service they provided, the Myth of Soma. Digital Bros cited declining subscription revenues (from €178,000 the previous year, to just €32,000) as the reason.

The Legend of Mir 2, The Legend of Mir 3, and the Myth of Soma were all closed in Europe in March 2009.
