= Hator =

Ukrainian manufacturer of gaming equipment

HATOR
- Native name: ХатОр
- Industry: Consumer electronics
- Founded: 2015; 11 years ago in Kyiv, Ukraine
- Headquarters: Kyiv, Ukraine
- Website: hator.gg

HATOR Gaming (Ukrainian: ХатОр) is a Ukrainian registered brand that manufactures gaming-specialized computer equipment such as mice, keyboards, chairs, mouse pads, headsets, and more. All products of the brand have Ukrainian localization. In addition to Ukraine, the company sells its products in Moldova, Armenia, and Georgia.

== History ==
The HATOR brand was founded in Kyiv in 2015, when the trademark of the same name was registered. And the company's first product appeared on the market on October 1, 2018.

The initiator of the brand was Oleg Moroz, who was one of the first in Ukraine to form the market for gamers, starting distribution of Razer, SteelSeries, DXRacer, and co-founder TM "Zona51" and z51.ua, which operates a retail network of specialized stores for gamers.

In 2019, the company entered the market of Moldova, and in 2020 entered the markets of Armenia and Georgia.

HATOR is working with e-sports organization Natus Vincere in organizing esport events and launching PC accessories with Na'Vi logo.

In 2021, HATOR also sponsored The International 10's Dota 2 tournament translation in Ukraine.

The official distributor of the HATOR brand in Ukraine is Eletek.
