= Digimon Masters =

2009 video game

- Developer: movegames
- Publishers: movegames, Joymax (English version, 2011-2016), GameKing (English version, 2016-present)
- Designer: movegames
- Series: Digimon
- Engine: Gamebryo (2009–2022); Unity (2022–)
- Platform: Windows
- Release: KOR: October 30, 2009; WW: October 20, 2011
- Genre: Massively multiplayer online role-playing
- Mode: Multiplayer

Digimon Masters (Korean: 디지몬 마스터즈) also known as Digimon Masters Online is a free-to-play, massive multiplayer online role-playing game (MMORPG) with microtransactions. The game is based on the Digimon media franchise, specifically the universe and characters of the fifth anime series; Digimon Data Squad (though many aspects of Digimon Adventure, Digimon Adventure 02, Digimon Tamers, Digimon Frontier, and Digimon Fusion are incorporated). The game was first released in South Korea on October 30, 2009. An English version was scheduled to be released in December 2010 by WeMade Entertainment (the company responsible for the English Version of Digimon Battle), but it was delayed to 2011. It was announced in July 2011 that Joymax, a subsidiary of WeMade Entertainment would publish the English version of the game. On August 30, 2011, Joymax held a pre-CBT for players, which ended on September 6, 2011. After the conclusion of the pre-CBT, Joymax announced on September 22, 2011 that the OBT will be held on September 27. The OBT for Digimon Masters concluded on October 11, 2011, with the game going into commercial service globally on October 20, 2011, except for some countries, including Japan and Indonesia.

In June 2022, a remaster of the game was announced, with the game engine changing to Unity and a target release date of the second half of 2023.

As of August 2026, the remaster has not been released, and the game has been affected by recurring DDoS attacks. Following player reports of disruptions, Move Games updated its Terms of Service to state that it is not responsible for providing compensation and that players should not expect any compensation due to such disruptions.

== Background ==
=== Digital World ===
In the Digimon franchise, the Digital World is a virtual space built from Earth's communication networks, inhabited by creatures called Digimon. Digimon are life-like organisms with independent intelligence that grow similarly to organisms on Earth. They can become stronger and more resilient by undertaking an evolution. The Digital World is a parallel universe to the Real World where humans live. It exists inside a host computer called King Drasil, which Artificial Intelligence controls. Digimon can be transported into the real world as the Digital World grows more powerful.

=== Growth and evolution ===
In the series, all Digimon are born from Digi-Eggs and evolve and grow through Digivolution. A Digimon grows by hunting other Digimon and absorbing data from them. The Digimon prepare to devolve into the next evolution type when they reach a certain level. Some Digimon establish friendly relations with humans as their Partners and can digivolve through "mortal power." The human is called a Tamer and the Digimon a Partner Digimon.

== Gameplay ==
Players control an avatar of one of the four main Tamers of Digimon Data Squad: Marcus Damon, Thomas H. Norstein, Yoshino Fujieda, and Keenan Crier. The avatar is not meant to represent the actual Tamer, and thus players can choose their own name and modify the appearance of the Avatar. After selecting a Tamer, players are then able to select a Partner Digimon. The Partner Digimon will be used in battle to accomplish NPC-given missions. The player may also hatch new Mercenary Digimon from DigiEggs dropped by enemy Digimon. Over the course of the game, Partner and Mercenary Digimon will Digivolve into stronger forms (some of which may require special items or quests to unlock) and learn new skills.

=== Mercenary System ===
This system allows the player to get Digimon, which is not Partner Digimon. The player must hatch the Mercenary Digi-egg using an incubator and the right type of DATA (chips) items. Mercenary Digi-eggs and data items can be acquired through gameplay (after defeating enemy Digimon) or purchased in the cash shop. After injecting DATA three times successfully, the player can hatch the Mercenary Digimon, each time representing one stage of development. The player may inject additional DATA until the fourth or fifth stage. The higher the stage, the bigger the Digimon. However, the Mercenary Digi-egg may break after one or several attempts past the third stage. The alternate way to hatch a Mercenary Digi-egg is to buy it from the cash shop. The Mercenary Digi-egg bought from the cash shop has a 100% success rate for at least 3 bars.

=== Battle System ===
Battling is done in real-time. The player's Digimon has a health bar measuring health and a Digi-soul meter. The Digi-soul meter measures the energy of Digimon to use special attacks, and when empty, the Digimon can only use standard attacks. While in combat, Tamers can use items that restore health and Digi-soul but must wait several seconds before being able to do so again.

Unlike Digimon, Battle combat takes place in real-time, with nearby players watching and even joining in on battles.

=== Digivolution ===
In the series, all Digimon possess a "digivolution tree", which consists of a hierarchy of possible evolutions. As they level up, users can complete quests in order to trigger digivolution. Upon reaching the digivolution limit or completing certain quests, the digivolution tree becomes automatically available. Users can advance the development of their Digimon by utilizing a Tamer's DNA Charge.

The game features 10 of the 11 available crests and Digi-Eggs (Armor type). Each crest corresponds to a particular Digi-Egg, and the crests are utilized to open the digivolution tree. After combining certain elements, an entity of its digivolution tree is available. Each Digi-Egg has a distinct quantity of DNA, and digivolving consumes a certain amount of DNA. Consequently, digivolving to a higher level necessitates a greater amount of DNA.

=== Probability Item System ===
The newest addition to the game added rare coins bought from the cash shop or just plain cash for crowns, along with the new probability box item system. These boxes have very rare pieces required to unlock more powerful digivolutions such as X-evolution (i.e., OmegamonX). Although released in events inside these boxes, the events around these boxes have been controversial because they require the person to spend lots of real-life money to win the rarest item from the event, which is usually the most desirable item. This same probability system was first used as an in-game event system which did not require a player to spend any real currency, just in-game items or currency, but has recently gone to the cash shop and seems to be here to stay.
