= XBOCT =

Ukrainian esports player

ХВОСТ
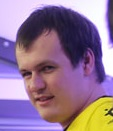
- Dashkevich in 2014

Personal information
- Name: Alexander Dashkevich
- Born: Yalta, Ukrainian SSR, Soviet Union
- Nationality: Ukrainian

Alexander Yuriyovych Dashkevich (born 1990), also known as XBOCT ("Hvost"), is a Ukrainian former professional Dota and Dota 2 player. He is best known for his tenure with Natus Vincere (Na'Vi), where he was part of the team that won The International 2011.

== Early life ==
Dashkevich was born in 1990 in Yalta, then part of the Ukrainian SSR in the Soviet Union. He developed an early interest in video games, starting with Warcraft III and later moving to DotA.

Dashkevich studied finance at the Kyiv National University of Trade and Economics. While in Kyiv, he competed with a local team named Hard Team and won a prominent regional tournament, leading to his recruitment by the professional team Planet-X.

== Professional career ==
=== Natus Vincere (2010–2015) ===
In October 2010, Dashkevich joined Natus Vincere.The team soon became one of the strongest in Eastern Europe, especially after acquiring Danil "Dendi" Ishutin and Ivan Antonov (ArtStyle) from the rival team DTS.

The team won The International 2011, the first edition of Dota 2 premier tournament and earning a $1 million grand prize.

Following ArtStyle's departure, Dashkevich moved into the carry role, becoming known for his aggressive playstyle. Between 2011 and 2013, Na'Vi reached three consecutive TI grand finals, though they only won in 2011. Despite early dominance, Na'Vi's results declined after 2013. In 2015, the organization disbanded its roster, and Dashkevich left the team.

=== Later career (2015–2017) ===
After Na'Vi, Dashkevich played for several other teams, including Team Empire, Fantastic Five, and Team Spirit, and briefly stood in for Virtus.pro and HellRaisers. However, these stints yielded limited success.

In March 2017, he joined the esports division of Russian football club FC Anzhi Makhachkala, known as Cyber Anji. Due to interpersonal issues, he left the team within two months.

=== Coaching (2017–2018) ===
In July 2017, Dashkevich returned to Na'Vi as a coach. He held the role until September 2018.

== Legacy ==
XBOCT is regarded as one of the most iconic players from the early competitive Dota 2 scene, especially in the CIS region. In 2015, he was ranked among the ten most popular Dota 2 players globally.

== Achievements ==
- The International Champion – 2011 (with Na'Vi)
