= INCA Internet =

South Korean software company

INCA Internet Co., Ltd. (주) 잉카인터넷
- Company type: Private
- Industry: Software
- Founded: January 31, 2000; 26 years ago in Seoul, Republic of Korea
- Founder: Young Heum Joo
- Headquarters: Guro Digital Complex in Seoul, South Korea
- Area served: Computer security
- Key people: Young Heum Joo: President and CEO
- Products: nProtect Netizen nProtect GameGuard; GameGuard Personal 2007 nProtect Anti-virus/Spyware 2007 nProtect Internet Security 2007 nProtect Enterprise nProtect Scanner USB

INCA Internet Corporation (Korean: 잉카인터넷), also known as nProtect, is a corporation which sells computer software. INCA Internet was founded by Young Heum Joo, the current CEO and President of INCA Internet, in 2000. It offers anti-virus, anti-spyware, game security, and unified corporate security. It is headquartered in Seoul, Republic of Korea.

== Company overview ==
INCA Internet is an information security company based in Republic of Korea, and develops the 'nProtect' line of computer security products. Young Heum Joo founded the company on January 31, 2000, and is currently the CEO and President. The company currently holds more than 70% of the market share of information security for Korean financial institutions and more than 90% of game portal security. It is a public company limited by shares, Young Hem Joo being the largest stockholder, followed by JAIC from Japan and MeesPierson from the Netherlands. Other major investors include JAIC, Japan's largest independent venture capital firm, and KDB (Korea Development Bank).

The main business areas of INCA Internet include online PC security services for financial institutions, internet business corporations, and online game corporations, among others; online game security solutions, a united PC security solution for corporate internal security and a B2C business such as an online Anti-Virus for normal internet users.

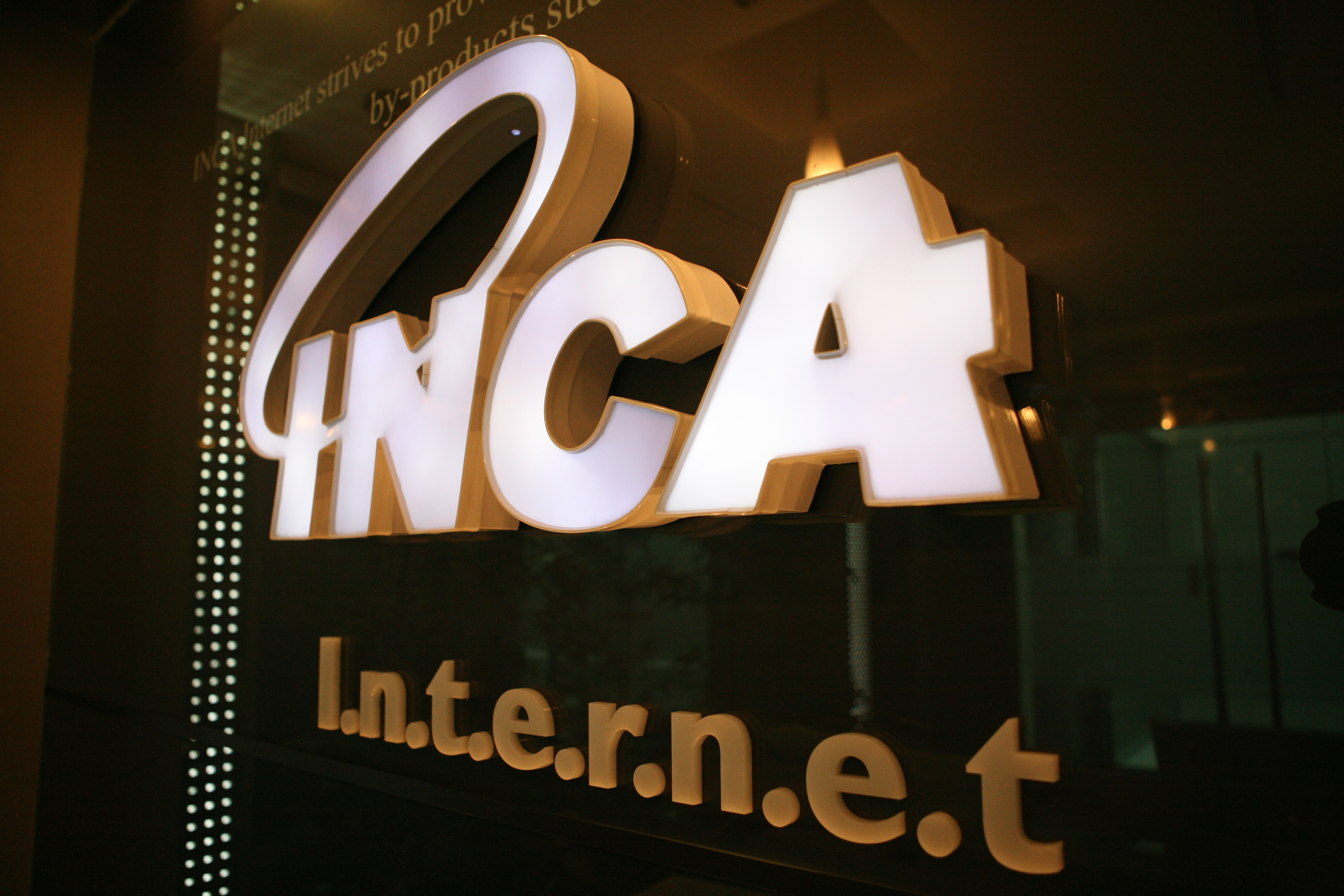
INCA Internet Headquarters Entrance at Guro Digital Complex, Seoul

INCA Internet was one of the first Application Service Provider (ASP) companies in the online PC security industry. The products are widely used by Korean and Japanese financial institutions, public institutions, worldwide on-line game companies.

INCA Internet was awarded the IR52 Jang Yeong-sil award, which is regarded as the highest and most reputable award in the Korean industrial technology field. It acquired the ISO 9000 Certificate by TUViT, an IT certification institution affiliated to the German RWTUV group. INCA Internet was the only information security company in South Korea to be included in the Deloitte Technology Fast500 Asia Pacific 2007. INCA Internet currently has client companies in 23 countries and a total of more than 200 million users in over 170 countries.

== History ==
INCA Internet first entered the market in January 2000, and acquired a global patent through 'nProtect Netizen' which was the first program to provide a real-time client PC information security service. INCA Internet has developed into a strong corporation with an independent technology and is leading the Korean and Japanese security market in the financial and electronic commerce industry.

Since December 2005, INCA Internet has been located within the Guro Digital Complex, which is the largest IT industrial complex of South Korea and played a role in the economic growth of Korea, referred to as the "Miracle on the Han" contributing 10% of national exports in the 1970s. It is a futuristic industrial hub, centering on research and development, advanced information, technology, and knowledge industries. The relocation has had a synergy effect on INCA Internet and many IT corporations located here have benefited through information sharing and partnerships.

== Markets ==
All INCA Internet nProtect products apply a SaaS (software as a service) model. It was the first company of the security industry to provide internet banking security online and has since spread the SaaS model into PC security and web security.

The company currently holds more than 70% of the market share of information security for Korean financial institutions and more than 90% of game portal security. Internationally, INCA Internet mainly provides security solutions for China, Japan, South-east Asia, and Europe. Companies such as JCB Card, UFJ, Tokyo Star Bank are among some of the corporations using INCA Internet's protection.

== Products ==
=== nProtect GameGuard ===
Online Game Security System

- Provides game security for online game companies and portal sites in the form of B2B2C to provide security to games and game users (from hacking, cracking, user account information stealing, system viruses and other cyber crimes)
- Bundled with many multiplayer online games such as Aion: The Tower of Eternity, Phantasy Star Universe, MapleStory, GunBound, GunZ: The Duel, Sudden Attack, FlyFF, Ragnarok Online and 9dragons
- Hides the game application process, monitors the entire memory range, terminates applications defined by the game vendor and INCA to be cheats, blocks certain calls to DirectX functions and Windows APIs and auto-updates itself to change as new threats surface.
- GameGuard is a subject of some controversy as the program itself is a rootkit that is installed without user authorization on their client machine.

=== nProtect Netizen, nProtect Personal, nProtect Keycrypt ===
ASP based PC Security

- Provides protection for internet banking, electronic commerce and online transactions
- 24-hour stabilization service and provides customization for clients
- Many business models are possible such as B2B2C, B2C, B2B according to the customer and client preferences and goals

=== nProtect Anti-Virus/Spyware, nProtect GameGuard Personal 2007 ===
Anti-virus Solution

- Provides end-user clients with real-time protection from viruses, spyware, hacking tools and other malware
- GameGuard Personal product which contains PC optimization, game account protection, and Game Mode features for game users
- File Management feature for file encryption/decryption and Secure Deletion.

=== nProtect Enterprise ===
Unified Solution

- Provides protection for corporations, public institutions, research facilities and educational institutions in the form of B2B based on PC firewall technology and provides a unified PC security solution for corporate users,
- Provides unified administrator features for security managers and electronic managers within the organization.
- Prevention of information leakage of sensitive and confidential information through information asset security.

=== nProtect WebScan ===
Web Security

- Provides web security by inspecting the security vulnerabilities of applications providing services through the web and providing detailed descriptions and solutions to the vulnerabilities.
- Inspects the Top 10 recommended security inspections by OWASP and further inspects for new, popular attacks and vulnerabilities of the server or service.
- It provides fast inspection through multi-thread inspection and also provides a simulated hacking tool that can be used to simulate a security breach for security vulnerabilities found to provide a better understanding of the vulnerability.

== See also ==
- nProtect GameGuard
- Anti-Virus Software
