= Digimon Battle Online =

2002 video game

- Developers: movegames WeMade Entertainment (online)
- Publishers: movegames, Bandai, CDC Games; WeMade Entertainment (online); GAMEKING (English, 2022)
- Designer: DIGITALIC
- Series: Digimon
- Platform: Windows
- Release: KOR: January 22, 2002; CHN: September 25, 2008; NA: April 14, 2010
- Genre: Massively multiplayer online role-playing
- Mode: Multiplayer

Digimon RPG (Korean:디지몬 RPG), previously released in North America as Digimon Battle, is a free to play micro-transaction supported massively multiplayer online role-playing game in a setting based on that of the Digimon media franchise, specifically the Digimon Tamers anime. The game was first released in South Korea, but an English version was released on April 14, 2010, by WeMade Entertainment titled Digimon Battle, which ran for 3 years. The South Korean version still runs to this day. On July 22, 2022, the game was relaunched in North America.

== Game basics ==
Players control an avatar of one of the four main characters of Digimon Tamers: Takato Matsuki, Rika Nonaka, Henry Wong, and Jeri Katou. The players are not intended to be representing the actual characters, and thus are allowed to choose their own name and modify their appearance to some extent. Players then choose a "starter Digimon." The starter Digimon selected is one of the three used by Takato, Rika, and Henry in Tamers: Gigimon, Gummymon, or Viximon. In addition, different starter Digimon are sometimes offered during special events. So far, events have offered DemiVeemon, Hopmon, Yaamon, Dorimon, and a Digimon Savers-themed Koromon. Regardless, the player chooses a starter Digimon, which they use in battle to obtain stronger Digimon and accomplish NPC-given missions. Over the course of the game, starter and captured Digimon will digivolve into stronger forms with more powerful attacks.

=== Capturing Digimon ===
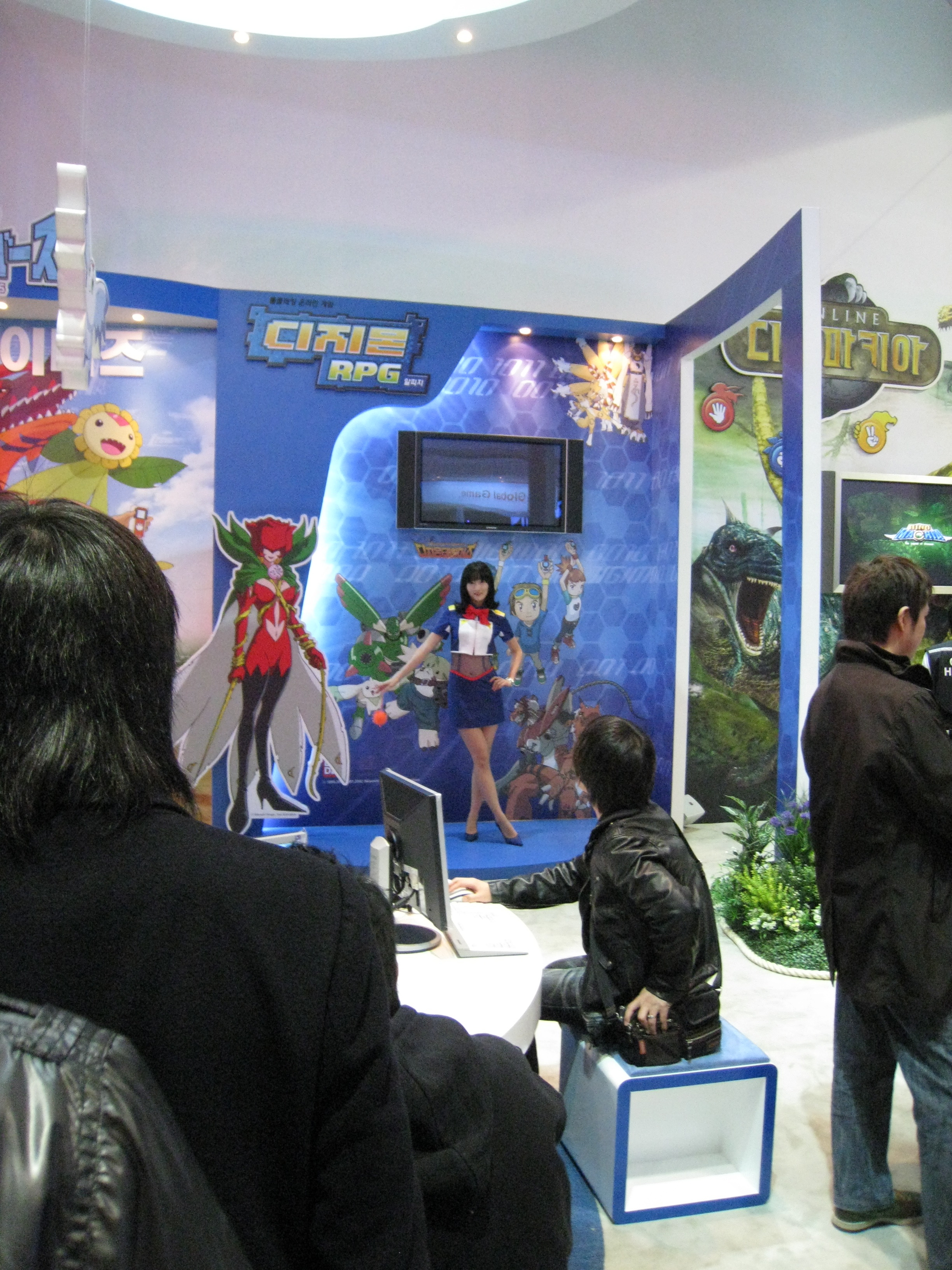
A presentation at a Digimon RPG booth in South Korea

Most Digimon begin at In-Training and generally are able to digivolve to either Ultimate or Mega Level. During battle, the player has three tries to capture an In-Training level Digimon, via the "capture" option in the in-game interface. Rookie level Digimon can also be captured with a special item "Taming Net: Rookie X".

=== Battle ===

Battling is done in a turn based style. The player does not directly fight in battle. Instead, a Digimon chosen by the player as his or her "main" Digimon fights in their stead. Each Digimon has a time bar that goes up over the course of the battle. When the time bar fills, the Tamer may take action with that Digimon, such as attacking, fleeing, or using items to recover health.

In battle, the player is only directly able to use card items to temporarily alter their Digimon's stats, induce digivolution, or switch in other Digimon they own. A tamer can only use 3 cards at a time, and are limited to a certain number of card uses per battle. Cards are bought in-game or traded with other players.

== English version ==
In early 2010, WeMade Entertainment signed a contract with Digitalic allowing them to release Digimon RPG along with its sequel, Digimon Masters. Originally Digitalic had signed a contract with CDC Games, however the contract was cancelled.

Digimon Battle is the English version of the Korean Digimon RPG, which was originally scheduled to be released sometime in 2009 by CDC Games. An open beta was released, with Korean MMO developer and service provider "WeMade Entertainment" handling its operation, and the game was officially released April 14, 2010.

On March 27, 2013, WeMade announced Digimon Battle would be closed on 25 April 2013.

Nine years later, in June 2022, the game re-launched in English under the name Digimon RPG, without any of the gameplay changes present in the previous North American version.

== Development ==
Kevin Seo, CEO of WeMade, looked to comments from fans for inspiration when creating the English adaptation. From May 19 to June 2, players could level up their characters as quickly as possible and train five of their Digimon to the Mega stage, both in order to win prizes. Also, a "Mystery Box" containing randomly generated items was set during this time to appear more frequently than normal in the "Sky Dungeon" area.
