= OGPlanet =

Video games publisher

Gamefactory, Inc. T/A OGPlanet
- Industry: Video games
- Founded: 2005
- Defunct: September 29, 2017
- Headquarters: Torrance, California (HQ) (Subsidiary Companies); Vancouver, British Columbia; Seoul, South Korea
- Area served: Global
- Services: MMO games publishing
- Website: www.ogplanet.com

OGPlanet was a publisher of free-to-play, massively multiplayer online (MMO), downloadable PC games, based in Torrance, California, with offices in Vancouver, Berlin, London and Seoul. Although their games were free-to-play, OGPlanet offered "Astros", an in-game currency that players could purchase online through Xsolla using a variety of payment methods including credit and debit cards and PayPal; Astros were used for in-game enhancements. On 29 September 2017, the final game being published by OGPlanet, Uncharted Waters Online, was shut down for transfer to Papaya Play and the OGPlanet website taken offline.

== History ==
OGPlanet was established in 2005 with the goal of bringing MMO games from around the world to North American and global audiences. The company first established itself with the magical golf game Albatross18: Realms of Pangya in 2005. Albatross18 was well received by players. With the success of Albatross18, and its second season in 2006, OGPlanet began to expand with other titles. In 2007, the company launched the popular MMO fighting game Rumble Fighter, as well as Season 3 of Albatross18 and BB Tanks. The first MMORPG title for OGPlanet, CABAL Online, launched early in 2008 to both player and critical acclaim, followed by the whimsical two-dimensional MMORPG, La Tale. In the summer of 2009, Rumble Fighter Europe was released. Shortly after, the online fighting game, Lost Saga launched with its closed beta in mid-October and final release in November. It was showcased at the World Cyber Games 2010 in Los Angeles, California. OGPlanet then launched Zone 4, another MMO fighting game but with more of an arcade brawler/beat’em up feel. On October 19, 2011, SD Gundam Capsule Fighter Online joined OGPlanet's game roster, through an agreement with Bandai Korea."OGPlanet to publish SD Gundam Capsule Fighter Online".

In the years following, OGPlanet would close its services for all hosted games which included Lost Saga in March of 2013, Tales Runner on 20 April 2017, La Tale on 27 June 2017, and Uncharted Waters Online on 9 September 2017. After OGPlanet's closure of services for Uncharted Waters Online, the company would soon take their website offline and later become defunct. Uncharted Waters Online and La Tale are both currently being published by Papaya Play.

== Published games ==
- La Tale
- Rumble Fighter
- Zone 4: Fight District
- Red Stone
- Heva Clonia Online
- Dizzel Online
- Lost Saga
- Tactical Intervention
- Heroes of the Realm
- SD Gundam Capsule Fighter
- Metro Conflict
- Albatross 18
- BB Tanks
- Tales Runner
- Legends of honor
- Uncharted Waters Online
- GunDog
