= SD Gundam Capsule Fighter Online =

2007 video game

- Developer(s): Softmax
- Publisher(s): Netmarble
- Series: Gundam
- Release: KOR: Q2/Q3 2007
- Genre(s): MMOTPS
- Mode(s): Multiplayer

SD Gundam Capsule Fighter Online (SDGO) is a MMOTPS developed by South Korea based PC game company Softmax that allows players to take command of Units involving all Gundam eras such as: Universal Century, Anno Domini(Gundam 00), Future Century(G Gundam) and many more.

== History ==
It started online service since summer 2007 in the Republic of Korea.

Later on January 4, 2008, Shanghai-based game company 9You today announced its licensing agreement with Bandai Korea to operate online action casual game SD Gundam Capsule Fighter Online (SD Online) in Mainland China, Hong Kong and Macau.

On March 20, 2009, the Japanese export contract was signed for SDGO with publisher CJ internet, the game now has a Website for Japan

On October 19, 2011, the North American-based online gaming publisher, OGPlanet, announced its agreement with Bandai Korea to release the game in North America. It was released in December 2011.

On January 19, 2012, Shanda Games International announced that it has entered into an agreement with Bandai Korea, to distribute SD Gundam Capsule Fighter Online in Singapore, Malaysia, Philippines and Australia under Cherry Credits. The closed-beta test for these countries rolled out on February 14, 2012.

On March 14, 2012, Indonesian based-game company Megaxus announced its agreements with Bandai Korea to release the game and the closed beta test for Indonesian SDGO began at April 30, 2012, then officially released at May 15, 2012.

In July 2012, the game was featured at TGX Thailand 2012.

On April 30, 2015, Bandai Korea announced the closure of SD Gundam Capsule Fighter Online on the Korean server. They offered a refund on things bought within the year and were unused. The Game closed on May 29, 2015. All servers other than NA had either been shut down or have announced their closure. OGP NA Server had yet to announce anything about the status of their server.

On June 30, 2015, OGPLANET announced the closure of NA server and that marked the final server of this game to be closed.

== Structure ==
The game was played through multiplayer matches of up to 12 players, or co-op missions of up to 4 players. Multiplayer matches provided rewards of points (in-game currency) and experience, with bonuses for the winning team or players, and additional bonuses based on game length. Mission rewards are randomized, and may sometimes include additional items.

Mobile suits could be obtained via rental, random purchase through capsules (hence the title), and through mixing. Mixing requires the purchase of a Mixing Plan, a fully upgraded "key" mobile suit, and a number of specific component suits that get discarded during mixing.

The strength of a mobile suit is described by its rank. C ranks are the weakest and most common, having four lives in the deathmatch game mode. B ranks have three lives, but are more difficult to obtain. A ranks are even stronger, but have only two lives. S rank units have 2 lives and are currently the strongest units in the game and can be bought with real currency or their mix plans can be bought with points. Some mobile suits have rare CR, BR, and AR variants, which can only be capsuled, and have different weapons or abilities. Additionally, there are CS, BS, AS and SS mobile suits, which are similar, but can only be acquired through mixing.

Mobile suits were formerly further categorized into rock, paper, and scissor types, with a self-explanatory relationship. Rocks are traditionally oriented toward hand-to-hand combat, whereas papers were long-range, and scissors were mid-range.

There was a high degree of customization available in the game. The player can purchase paint sets and stickers to change the appearance of mobile suits, and tweak their stats slightly. Especially rare items, such as red paint, extra storage, operators, and room themes, however, were unattainable with in-game currency, and could only be purchased with real money.
