= The Legend of Mir =

The Legend of Mir may refer to:

- The Legend of Mir 1
- The Legend of Mir 2
- The Legend of Mir 3

== See also ==
- Mir (disambiguation)
