= Survival Project =

- A promotional poster
- Developer(s): I.O. Entertainment
- Publisher(s): HanbitSoft
- Platform(s): Microsoft Windows
- Release: SK: November 2001 (closed beta); SK: April 22, 2002 (public beta); SK: February 17, 2003 (full release); WW: June 9, 2003 - November 3, 2003
- Genre(s): Action RPG, MMORPG
- Mode(s): Multiplayer

Survival Project: Search for the Legendary Orb (Korean: 서바이벌 프로젝트) was a 2D fantasy massively multiplayer online action role-playing game with emphasis on real-time combat and PvP. It was the first game HanbitSoft commercialized and was released in 2003. The International version was also released in 2003 for the 2003 WCG Survival Project Tournament as a Korean Government sponsored game. The international servers were later closed on October 31, 2004, after the partners of the game built up their own localized sites. E-Games Malaysia hosted the English servers from then on, providing many feature updates to the original game. However the Malaysian servers also closed down on March 31, 2007. Lastly, the Korean Server closed down on February 24, 2013.

== Gameplay ==
Survival Project featured various gameplay modes including various PVP and PVE-based game modes, along with quests that could be played alone or with other players. Players could also join guilds.

== See also ==
- HanbitSoft
- Massively multiplayer online role-playing game
