= World Cyber Games 2010 =

The 2010 World Cyber Games (also known as WCG 2010) took place from September 30 to October 3, 2010, in the Los Angeles Convention Center, Los Angeles, US. The event hosted 450 competing players from 58 countries competing over prizes worth over $250,000.

== Official games ==
=== PC games ===
- Carom3D
- Dead or Alive Xtreme Beach Volleyball
- FIFA 10
- StarCraft: Brood War
- TrackMania Nations Forever
- Warcraft III: The Frozen Throne

=== Xbox 360 games ===
- Forza Motorsport 3
- Guitar Hero 5
- Tekken 6

=== Mobile games ===
- Asphalt 5
- Angry Birds
- Minesweeper
- Fun Run
- Grand Theft Auto
- SNAKE

=== Promotion games ===
- League of Legends
- Lost Saga
- Quake Wars Online

== Results ==
=== Official ===
Event	Gold		Silver		Bronze	
Asphalt 5	(Australia) Charlie Elliott (Tenshii)		(South Korea) Won-Joon Lee (KimBuJa)		(Russia) Phillip Mussuri (Mussuri)	
Carom3D	(Brazil) Fernando Rogoski (Pantaneiro)		(Brazil) Fabio Fonseca (TheLogaN)		(South Korea) Hee-Chul Kim (MARCJACOBS)	
Counter-Strike 1.6	NaVi (Ukraine)	Yegor Markelov (markeloff)	mTw.dk (Denmark)	Christoffer Sunde (Sunde)	Frag-Executors (Poland)	Jakub Gurczynski (kuben)
Counter-Strike 1.6	NaVi (Ukraine)	Sergey Ischuk (starix)	mTw.dk (Denmark)	Alexander Holdt (ave)	Frag-Executors (Poland)	Mariusz Cybulski (Loord)
Counter-Strike 1.6	NaVi (Ukraine)	Danylo Teslenko (Zeus)	mTw.dk (Denmark)	Danny Sørensen (zonic)	Frag-Executors (Poland)	Filip Kubski (Neo)
Counter-Strike 1.6	NaVi (Ukraine)	Arsenij Trynozhenko (esenin)	mTw.dk (Denmark)	Martin Heldt (trace)	Frag-Executors (Poland)	Jarosław Jarząbkowski (pasha)
Counter-Strike 1.6	NaVi (Ukraine)	Ivan Sukharev (Edward)	mTw.dk (Denmark)	Oliver Ari Minet (minet)	Frag-Executors (Poland)	Wiktor Wojtas (TaZ)
FIFA 10	(United Kingdom) Michael Patsias (MikeZy)		(China) Zheng Yeng (Zola)		(Slovakia) Michal Polívka (bl4ck_p01nt)	
Forza Motorsport 3	(United Kingdom) David Kelly (d.Daveyskills)		(Germany) Niklas Krellenberg (Johnson)		(Netherlands) Wouter von Someren (Handewasser)	
Guitar Hero 5	(United States) Alec Castillo (vVv Acai28)		(United Kingdom) George Boothby (ti.Monkey)		(Netherlands) Boy Kremers (Kaos.Boyke)	
StarCraft	(South Korea) Young-Ho Lee (Flash)		(South Korea) Goo-Hyun Kim (Goojila)		(South Korea) Jae-Dong Lee (Jaedong)	
Tekken 6	(South Korea) Jae-Min Bae (Knee)		(Japan) Akihiro Abe (AO)		(Japan) Shutaro Kitahara (honnda)	
TrackMania	(Sweden) Kalle Videkull (FrostBeule)		(Austria) Peter Strele (PeZi)		(France) Dorian Vallet (Carl)	
Warcraft III: The Frozen Throne	(South Korea) Sung-Sik Kim (ReMinD)		(Netherlands) Manuel Schenkhuizen (Grubby)		(South Korea) June Park (Lyn)	

=== Promotion ===
Event	Gold		Silver		Bronze	
League of Legends	Counter Logic Gaming (United States) (Canada)	George Georgallidis (HotshotGG)	IWEARCAPEIRL (Germany) (Switzerland)	Shawn Roger Bourquin (Osaft22)	AnotherStory (Singapore)	Siong Chong Teo (Opio)
League of Legends	Counter Logic Gaming (United States) (Canada)	Sam Hartman-Kenzler (Kobe24)	IWEARCAPEIRL (Germany) (Switzerland)	Benjamin Hiller (SleazyWeazy)	AnotherStory (Singapore)	Lian-Quan Chen (amnesia)
League of Legends	Counter Logic Gaming (United States) (Canada)	Micheal Tang (bigfatlp)	IWEARCAPEIRL (Germany) (Switzerland)	Johannes Lüder (Severus)	AnotherStory (Singapore)	Pei-Xiang Daryl Koh (iceiceice)
League of Legends	Counter Logic Gaming (United States) (Canada)	Steve Chau (Chauster)	IWEARCAPEIRL (Germany) (Switzerland)	Wai Noch Shum (Reyk)	AnotherStory (Singapore)	Xing-Lei Wong (Chawy)
League of Legends	Counter Logic Gaming (United States) (Canada)	Cody Sigfusson (Elementz)	IWEARCAPEIRL (Germany) (Switzerland)	Christian Dietze (Zylor)	AnotherStory (Singapore)	Zhi-Ping Lim (d4rkness)
Lost Saga	Sanarae (South Korea)	Young-Ho Jeon (Cheetah)	TheFootClan (United States)	Joshua Thomas (Blavebliss)	GoodLuck (United States)	Michael Muller (Mike)
Lost Saga	Sanarae (South Korea)	Hyun-Sub Kim (Fate)	TheFootClan (United States)	Gustavo Calix (MonopolyGuy)	GoodLuck (United States)	Eddie Valdez (Professor)
Lost Saga	Sanarae (South Korea)	Tae-Kyung Park (Quixote)	TheFootClan (United States)	Eric Moore (TakuyaSugi)	GoodLuck (United States)	Anthony Piggott (Sonic)
Quake Wars Online	AmeriMiX (United States)	Richard Singh (H4rdc0re)	-ET- (South Korea)	Suk-Song In (Beatles)	FOOOOT (Australia)	?
Quake Wars Online	AmeriMiX (United States)	Michael Penna (ras.)	-ET- (South Korea)	Hyun-Ki Lee (ByukO)	FOOOOT (Australia)	?
Quake Wars Online	AmeriMiX (United States)	Ben Pratte (Adhesive)	-ET- (South Korea)	Jong-Woo Back (heroes07)	FOOOOT (Australia)	?
Quake Wars Online	AmeriMiX (United States)	Michael Free (raccoon)	-ET- (South Korea)	Tai-Ho Kim (iLIn)	FOOOOT (Australia)	?
Quake Wars Online	AmeriMiX (United States)	Kregg Malcolm (SoulVoid)	-ET- (South Korea)	Hyun-Choong Shin (skywest)	FOOOOT (Australia)	?
Quake Wars Online	AmeriMiX (United States)	Aleks Kostrikin (INF3RN0)	-ET- (South Korea)	Woo-Seong Jang (Woos)	FOOOOT (Australia)	?
