= La Tale =

2006 video game

- Developer: Actoz Soft
- Publishers: KOR: Actoz Soft; NA: Papaya Play; EU: Aeria Games; JP: Happytuk; TW: MangoT5; THA: Happytuk
- Platform: Windows
- Release: 21 July 2006
- Genre: MMORPG
- Mode: Multiplayer

La Tale is a side-scrolling online game developed and published by Actoz Soft. Player takes the role of an adventurer in a mythological fantasy world with three continents, Jiendia, Freios, and Eastland.

The game was released on 21 July 2006.

== Gameplay ==
Gameplay of La Tale is based on most MMORPGs. Players control a single character that combats monsters, obtains and completes quests, and participates in other activities. The game has a 2D side-scrolling setting similar to MapleStory and Ghost Online. The keyboard is used to hotkey character actions while the mouse is primarily used to speak to Non-player characters (NPCs), purchase items, and manipulate the items (via Enchants, Upgrades, etc.).

There are two types of currency in the North American version of La Tale: Ely and LTC. Ely is the normal in-game currency, used to buy equipment and other usable items. Ely is gained through killing monsters, selling items, and completing quests. LTC (an abbreviated version of "La Tale Coins") are the currency used to purchase fashion-shop items. LTC must be purchased through PapayaPlay, similar to buying NX Cash for Nexon products.

=== Gameplay and characters ===
One player account has three slots for characters. By purchasing an item called the Character Slot Card from either other players or the fashion shop, players can add up to eight more slots to their account. Players have the choice of choosing their character's gender, class, and appearance. Names are also given to characters at this point, but if a character is deleted, the name will not be reusable.

The game features experience points, which are gained through killing monsters and completing quests, though they can also be gained by saving at a Stone of Iris or Returning Stone. These experience points are used for a variety of leveling systems: normal levels, which are instanced per character and cap at 235 before progressing to account-wide Ascension and Ascension 2 levels, Ascension/Ascension 2 levels, which are account-wide, cap at 9999 and 100.00 respectively, and are able to be utilized for stat points that can be reallocated at will, and Awakening/Awakening 2 levels, which unlock stat nodes and new versions of skills that characters can utilize depending on the situation or desired play style.

=== Classes ===
There are 15 starting classes in La Tale. Each class specializes in one of the four stats in the game: Strength, which determines flinch rate and physical damage capability; Stamina, which determines HP and defense capability; Magic, which determines magical damage and magic defense; and Luck, which determines critical rate, Ely gain, and item drops.

- Warrior - A Strength-specializing class that focuses on close-ranged combat and can advance into either the greatsword and spear wielding Hero, or the dual sword-wielding combo-focused Blade Master.
- Knight - A Strength and Stamina-specializing class that serves as the vanguard and can control enemy crowds, which can advance into the sword and mace-wielding Savior, or the knuckle-wielding Sefirot.
- Wizard - A Magic-focused staff-wielding class that can support the party and use a variety of elemental magic, which can advance into the offensive orb-wielding Archmage, or the supportive guitar-wielding Pop Star.
- Explorer - A Strength and Luck-focused class that can either wield daggers, bows, or crossbows to attack enemies nimbly, which can advance into the trap-using, loot-seeking Wind Stalker, or the dual revolver-wielding Der Freischütz.
- Engineer - A Strength-focused class that uses a toolbox to deploy turrets around the map, which advances into the Mecha-piloting Swordian.
- Soul Breaker - A Magic-focused class that swaps between different monster souls in combat, which advances into the Soulless One.
- Card Master - A Magic-focused class that utilizes magical playing cards in combat, which later advances and incorporates monster summons either into melee attacks as a Force Master, or channeling attacks as an Arc Master.
- Wanderer - A Strength-focused class that either utilizes a katana for an offensive playstyle, or a Black Jade for a supportive playstyle, which advances into the Black Anima.
- Monk - A Magic-focused class that utilizes a large staff to attack enemies and utilizes two different stances to attack enemies, which advances into the Demigod.
- Mercenary - A Strength and Stamina-focused class that utilizes a colossal club to attack enemies and can create a barrier around themselves for protection. This class advances into the Agni.
- Fencer - A Strength-focused chained rapier-wielding swordfighter that focuses on nimble combat and advances into the Dark Chaser.
- Lancer - A Magic-focused lance-wielding knight who can turn into a berserk state after dying or at will, and advances into the Shadow Walker.
- Traveler - A Strength-focused chakram-wielding master of portals who can teleport crowds of enemies using portals to their advantage, which advances into the Gatekeeper.
- Sword Guardian - A Strength-focused sword-wielding fighter that can charge their attacks and cancel their attacks via sheathing their sword in order to deal maximum damage to enemies, which can advance into the Sword Saint.
- Dokkaebi - A Magic-focused baseball bat-wielding spiritualist who can utilize wisps in their attacks and even turn into one to fly. Notably, this class does not have any advancement, having the majority of its moveset unlocked upon leveling up instead.

==== Subclasses ====
After reaching level 140 in any primary class, the player can pick from 12 subclasses in the game that they can swap between within cities, regardless of stat focus.

- Highlander - A Strength-focused Fūma shuriken-wielding fighter that can launch their shuriken at enemies and fight at close range with it.
- Sword Dancer - A Strength-focused floating sword-wielding class that can manipulate their swords to attack enemies.
- Terror Knight - A Strength-focused gauntlet-wielding fighter that attacks enemies at close range and utilizes dark energy.
- Psykicker - A Strength-focused brawler that also utilizes psychokinetic abilities to fight enemies.
- Phantom Mage - A Strength and Magic-focused scythe-wielding magician that can augment their physical attacks with magic.
- Maestro - A Magic-focused baton-wielding magician that utilizes a summoned band to attack enemies and steal their life energy.
- Rogue Master - A Strength and Luck-focused dual dagger-wielding combo-focused class that focuses on swift combat.
- Judgment - A Strength-focused pistol sword-wielding fighter that specializes in shredding enemies and firing ammunition.
- Star Seeker - A Strength-focused mechanic that commands a variety of robots to attack enemies.
- Jewel Star - A Magic-focused jewel craftsman that utilizes a variety of magical jewels to support the party and attack enemies.
- Windia - A Strength-focused Japanese war fan-wielding class that can manipulate wind energy.
- Rainia - A Magic-focused parasol-wielding class that can manipulate water magic.

== Release ==
La Tale was officially launched in South Korea on 21 July 2006. In February 2007, Actoz entered into an agreement with Chinese game operator Shanda to open a server in mainland China. In March 2008 OGPlanet signed a contract with Actoz Soft to bring La Tale to North America. Aeria Games launched La Tale in Europe on July 30, 2009, and closed the server in October 2010.

Sign-ups for North America closed-beta testing began on July 10, 2008. Testers were selected from 22 to 30 July. Closed-beta testing began on July 31, and ended on August 6. An open-beta test was held for fileplanet subscribers from August 15-18. Official open-beta testing began on August 21, and ended on September 3. La Tale was officially released on September 18. La Tale was also published by GameNGame, but this version closed in May 2015. As of June 2017, La Tale has been relaunched by Papaya Play.

== Sequel ==
On 16 May 2024, VFive Games released La Tale Plus for iOS and Android.
