= The Legend of Mir 3 =

2004 video game

Legend of Mir 3
- Developer: WeMade Entertainment
- Publishers: WeMade Entertainment; Shanda; Softworld; Eye Entertainment; Optic Communication; Quality Games Online
- Platform: Windows
- Release: October 2004
- Genre: Massively multiplayer online role-playing game
- Mode: Multiplayer

The Legend of Mir 3 is a sprite based isometric 3-D massively multiplayer online role-playing game, developed by WeMade Entertainment. It is a sequel to The Legend of Mir 2.

The basic game mechanics remain largely unchanged from the previous version, with the exception of the graphics being upgraded from 8-bit color to 16-bit high color. There is also improved player customization, far larger maps, and a revamped quest system.

Like its predecessor The Legend of Mir 2, The Legend of Mir 3 is hugely popular in China and South Korea. It was certified by the Guinness Book of Records for having 750,000 subscribers online.

Game screenshot

By the time the game had closed in February 2012, it had 120 million registered users. The game also had a peak of 750,000 concurrent users online.

== Murder of Zhu Caoyuan ==
An October 2004 dispute between two Chinese players of the game erupted into murder. Qiu Chengwei, who had won the Red Dragon Sabre, an in-game virtual sword, had lent the sword to his friend, Zhu Caoyuan, who then sold the sword on eBay for 7200 yuan ($870). This enraged Qiu who then stabbed Zhu to death.
