= Uncharted Waters Online =

2005 video game

- Developer: Koei Tecmo
- Publishers: Netmarble→OGPlanet→Papaya Play (NA, EU); Koei→Koei Tecmo (Japan); Netmarble (Korea) Softstar→Cayenne Tech (Taiwan)
- Series: Uncharted Waters
- Platforms: Windows, PlayStation 3, PlayStation 4
- Release: JP: March 3, 2005; EU/NA: October 7, 2010
- Genre: MMORPG
- Mode: Multiplayer

Uncharted Waters Online (Japanese: 大航海時代 Online; lit. "Great Age of Sail" or "Age of Great Voyage") is an MMORPG set in the Age of Exploration, with the English version published by Papaya Play. It features over a hundred different sailing ships and an open world based on real Earth geography, with players engage in many activities such as combat, exploration, and trade on both sea and land while interacting with each other. It has a sandbox style game play and skill based character development. The game requires monthly subscription fee in Japan but the international server is free to play. It is developed by KOEI based on the Uncharted Waters series of games, and originally released in Japan.

Uncharted Waters Online is available on the Windows platform in English, simplified Chinese, traditional Chinese, Japanese and Korean. Six years after the initial Asian release, Netmarble published the game, under its traditional English title, for the non-Asian market in North America and Europe. The official English site was opened in August 2010. The closed beta test was conducted from August 25 to September 6, followed by its open beta test October 1. The game was officially launched on October 7. In November 2013, the global Netmarble service ended and was transferred to OGPlanet. In September 2017, the OGPlanet service ended and was transferred to Papaya Play, with a complete reset.

The Japanese version of the game was also available on the PlayStation 3 from 2009 until 2018, and is available on the PlayStation 4 since September 2015.

== Gameplay ==
Sailing on sea in Uncharted Waters Online

Uncharted Waters Online features a variety of gameplay concepts. The game can be divided into sea-based areas, land-based areas, and towns. Like most MMORPGs characters gain experience in skills and levels.

The player may choose from among 6 nationalities: Kingdom of England, Dutch Republic, Kingdom of France, Spanish Empire, Kingdom of Portugal, Republic of Venice. As well the player may choose from several "occupations" after choosing a basic class: adventurer, merchant, and soldier. However players can learn and upgrade skills from other classes, albeit needing more experience points. Under certain conditions a player may change their class, occupation, and nationality. Players are able to trade, explore, battle and join in live events such as the "Epic Sea Feud".

As an online game it offers Player vs. Player combat areas and factional warfare as well as socialization in the form of in-game chat and card games.

== Synopsis ==
=== Setting ===
Uncharted Waters Online is set within several timelines during the Age of Exploration as a romantic and historic fictional account of the era. Inconsistencies are found in the presence of Christopher Columbus and Elizabeth I of England as well as in some quests. Despite some of these timeline inaccuracies, the game offers educational content in the form of exploration of geography and culture. Players can discover quests with historical value such as learning about the economic decline of Venice, or the rise of England as a naval power.

=== Plot ===
Uncharted Waters Online also includes event storylines for each of the nationalities adding single player depth to a multiplayer environment. Each nation's storyline revolves around a protagonist and their journey much like in previous games of the series. The following contains a translation from the Beginner's Guide as well as basic character information.

==== Portugal ====
Portugal is a mercantile nation that prospers by trade from profits of the land facing the Atlantic Ocean. They quickly rode the advances of navigation, and were the first to round the Cape of Good Hope. Recently, after returning from the discovery of the Indian route, and fiercely compete with their neighbor, Spain.

Alvero Sarmiento (17) – a trader playing the marketplaces near Portugal. He is a leader among boys his age, and his smile endears himself towards people.
Diego Sarmiento (42) – the head of the Sarmiento Company, a major company representing Portugal.
Juan (10) – a boy who accompanies Alvero on his journeys.
Vasco da Gama (28) – Portuguese naval officer born to a noble house. He became a national hero by discovering the Indian route.
Sanjai (18) – Indian spice trader.

==== Spain ====
Spain is a powerful authoritarian kingdom dominated by the royal house of Habsburg. The Habsburgs' rise to the royal throne came because of the premature death of the late king's son. Spain came into possession of the Netherlands which is the territory of the current royal family.

In order to support the country's finances, the Netherlands have been taxed heavily, and as a consequence has raised support for their independence movement in recent years.

Baltasar Oliveira (38) – captain of the mercenary fleet working for Spain. He lives to hunt down the leader of the Barbary pirates named Khair ad Din. He is the leader of the Black Orca fleet.
Eduardo de Mascareñas (20) – the newest captain of the Black Orca fleet. He was born into just a normal house instead of the famed Hidalgo class. In order to fulfill his dream of promotion to a hidalgo he joins with Baltasar.
Augustino (39) – an officer originally from an artisan family in the heart of Italy.
Barbarossa Khair ad Din (38) - leader of the Barbary pirates. He sails out into the Mediterranean from his base of operations in Algeria.
Irene (29) – the barmaid at Marseille. Sophisticated and "high-maintenance" she is known as an "adult woman" who is chased after by many adventurers.

==== England ====
England is a small island country to the north for whom wool is the key industry. However, the wool market became unstable because of the Spanish political meddling in the Netherlands, which is England's biggest trading partner. The wool trade decreased, and a heavy recession ensued. The Queen wishes to repair the situation, but there is no method to compete with powerful Spain.

Liza Middleton (21) – an English naval officer from the former pirate Middleton house. She has gained notoriety for her courage.
Gordon (40) – a veteran crewman who has served the Middleton house for more than 14 years. He runs around trying to protect Liza.
William Middleton (29) – the family head of the Middleton house who was pirating 10 years earlier. He has passed on naval activities to his sister. He maintains friendly relations with the courier Fredrik nowadays.
Count Kilingrew (45) – the chief vassal who serves the English Royal Family. He treats the navy as his personal property.
McGregor (35) – a pirate who stood out after he had beaten the Middleton family.

==== Netherlands ====
The Netherlands is a rising maritime courier nation facing the North Sea. They are a producer of wool fabric. The main Habsburg territory of the Netherlands became Spanish territory by inheritance of the Spanish king. The Spanish political meddling awoke the independence movement, but the military strength of the House of Alba prevents the movement.

Fredrik Van Metteren (24) – specializing in the transport of 'dangerous' goods and naturally independent.
Egmont (25) – a nobleman representative to the Netherlands government. Recently he has been trying to increase monetary support from other nations for the independence movement.
Hoorn (28) – a revolutionary of commoner origins.
Amalia (18) – a towngirl liked by many who lives in Amsterdam.
Ines (25) – the trusted retainer of the House of Alba, who indirectly rule the Netherlands, and is a female officer of the Spanish navy.

==== France ====
France is an agrarian kingdom holding territory from the Mediterranean to the North Sea. France is surrounded by strong ocean-faring countries, and its seafaring business was delayed because of a long line of monarchs who were obsessed with themselves. The half-century delayed Renaissance starts from the Italian peninsula, and there are many nobles who collect rare treasures and artifacts.

Julien Clarence (23) – a quiet man who belongs to a treasure hunting family who holds the patronage of many nobles. He has excellent eyes in regards to art.
Countess DuBois (42) – the wife of a count in Marseille who wields much power. She has a proud and sadistic demeanor. She makes servants out of those who are unable to pay for services.
Augustine (39) – a one-eyed priest who recently came to Marseille.
France's Queen Mother (48) – the Queen Mother who holds real governmental power in France in place of the young King. At 17 she was married from the Medici family in Firenze, and after a while the king died.
Ogun (20) – a warrior who travels the continent of Africa. He knows the spirit of animals and how to survive.

==== Venice ====
Venice is a small city-state floating on the sea. It is called the "City of Water". Venice's maritime industry had long been prosperous, and Venice had long held a monopoly on the profits of the Mediterranean trade on pepper from Alexandria, but recently the Ottoman Empire appeared in the East and Portugal discovered a sea route to the Indies. The story line is intertwined with the French story line, and they have many of the same main characters.

Vittoria Orseoro (22)
Alvise Orseoro (30)
Harun (12)
Gradenigo (61)
Faisal (31)

== Development ==
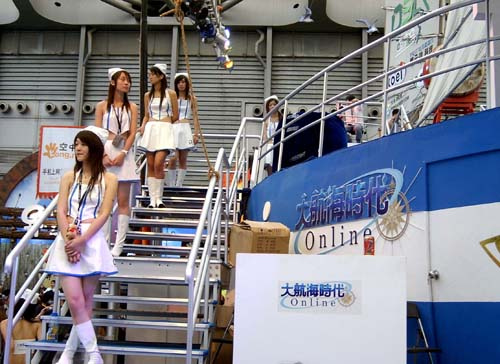
Cosplayers advertise the new Uncharted Waters Online at ChinaJoy 2006.

The Japanese version of Uncharted Waters Online offers mobile-to-game mail service for I-Mode, EZweb, or Vodafone Live! capable mobile phones. This service was beta tested until August 30, 2006.

== Expansions ==
=== La Frontera ===
"La Frontera" is the first expansion pack for Uncharted Waters Online released in 3 installments the first of which is titled "Aztec" on August 30, 2006. This extends the Age of Exploration from the early 16th century into the 17th century with new areas in South America & North America. The second chapter of the expansion titled "Angkor" was released on December 6, 2006, expanding the world map through Southeast Asia. The third chapter of the expansion titled "Spice Islands" continues to expand the world map throughout Southeast Asia.

Apart from new storyline the expansion includes "pirate islands" for irreputable players, "debates" using discovery card battles for adventurers' bragging rights, "joint built shipwrightery" for craftsmen, duels in towns, housing for all players, and a commissioned ferry service between large cities. The expansion also includes interactive towns that players can change from being a Merchant, Adventurer, or Navy town.

The land battle system was overhauled into a "Ranged-Shift Battle" system , where players choose from short, mid, and long-ranged combat positions with strengths and weaknesses. As well, 3 combat classes were released to enhance land combat-oriented players. New "Imperial Quests" allow players to run quests pertaining to a specific country.

=== Cruz del Sur ===
The second expansion pack titled "Cruz del Sur" was released in the late summer of 2007. As with the first expansion pack, "La Frontera", this second expansion includes 3 chapters, the first of which is entitled "Circumnavigation".

The second chapter (Special Ornaments) opens the special ornaments in players' flat and allows players to have a pet.

The third chapter (Grand Anniversary) and the fourth chapter (Inca) have been released.

The fifth chapter (Menace Of Ottoman) enabled players to be part of Ottoman by contract.

The extra chapter (Expedition) added new ports and fields in pacific region.

=== El Oriente ===
The third expansion pack 'El Oriente' was released in December 2009. The new expansion opened 4 east Asian countries: Japan, Taiwan, Korea, and China. Unlike previous chapters, the first chapter was released respective to the countries the game was hosted, which changes the order of chapters depending on the countries of the players.

The first chapter (Zipang) opens new ports and fields in Japan.

The second chapter (Ilha Formosa) opens new ports and fields in Taiwan.

The third chapter (The Morning Calm) opens new ports and fields in Korea.

The fourth chapter (The Land of The Dragon) opens new ports and fields in China.

=== Tierra Americana ===
Tierra Americana was released in the US version and introduces two new cities: Paris and Firenze ( Florence ), and also includes the possibility of colony founding by companies. The City of Panama update was later added.

=== 2nd Age ===
The expansion pack "2nd Age" added a number of new features into the game. In Chapter 1, the World Clock function was added. The era of time in-game will now change with players' actions. Each era represents a century of time with collaboration of historic events that happened in Europe during that century.

=== Gran Atlas ===
Released on Dec 13, 2013.

Chapter 1 (February 2015):

- 90% of the world map has been completed.
- A new map making feature has been added to allow players charting all sea regions.
- New story line quests have been added.
- New Bounty Hunter and Piracy system added.
- Game balances adjusted.

Episode Atlantis (March 3, 2015)

Chapter 2 - Astronomy (June 2015):

- New Adventurer skill Astronomy added.
- New type of Astronomy quests and discoveries added.
- New storyline quests added.

Chapter 3 - Wild West (October 2015):

- New City San Francisco.
- New feature Gold Mining (Gold Rush).
- Honorary Mayor system allowing players to become city mayors.
- New storyline quests added.

Chapter 4 - Ancient Glory (February 2016):

- New treasure hunts and adventure discoveries.
- New hidden location Hanging Garden.
- Sea Region Battle quests.

=== Age of Revolution ===
Chapter 1 Industrial Revolution (April 19, 2016)

Chapter 2 Cross a Continent (August 2016)

Chapter 3 Age of Reason (February 2017)

=== Order of the Prince ===
Chapter 1 (August 2017)

Chapter 2 Horizon (January 2018)

Chapter 3 Honor (April 2018)

=== Lost Memories ===
Chapter 1 (August 2018)

Chapter 2 Colossus (January 2019)

Chapter 3 Cetus (July 2019)

Seven Wonders (March 2020)

== Music ==
Different game score soundtracks for the different expansion packs have been released over the years: "La Frontera" on August 30, 2006; "Tierra Americana" on February 22, 2011; "2nd Age" on September 30, 2012; "Gran Atlas" on December 3, 2013; and a 10th anniversary complete soundtrack on March 3, 2015, encompassing the aforementioned four albums and some previously unofficially released tracks from the installation disc of "El Oriente".
