= Rumble Fighter =

2007 video game

- Logo for Rumble Fighter
- Developer: Nimonix
- Publishers: OGPlanet (2007–2014), GamesCampus (2014–2016), RedFox Games (2016–present)
- Platform: Microsoft Windows
- Release: August 2007
- Genres: Fighting, Online multiplayer
- Mode: Multiplayer

Rumble Fighter (Korean: 젬파이터) is a free-to-play online multiplayer fighting game developed by South Korean studio Nimonix. Rumble Fighter is an intense action fighting MMO game in which up to 8 players simultaneously battle each other in energized hand-to-hand combat. The game features martial-arts-themed combat where players can equip collectible fighting styles known as Scrolls and special transformation abilities called ExoCores.

== Gameplay ==
Rumble Fighter combines beat-'em-up and arena-fighting mechanics in an online environment. Players create customizable avatars that equip Scrolls—representing martial-arts fighting styles—and ExoCores—special transformations and abilities that unlock unique attacks. Matches support up to eight players in free-for-all or team-based formats. The game modes include: Battle Mode (elimination combat in 1 v 1 or team formats), Rumble Mode (variants with special rules such as King-of-the-Hill, Potion Battle, and other formats) and Adventure Mode (cooperative missions versus AI-controlled enemies).

To create a new character, players have to choose between several classes with different strengths and weaknesses. Striker is a warrior class with physical combat skills - using the ExoCore improves their strength and speed, dealing more damage to the opponents. Soul Fighter call upon the living souls to boost their power and rely on hit and run attacks, with their strong points being speed and jump. ExoCore transforms them into beasts, increasing all the abilities. Elementalists have psychic powers that they use to create ranged attacks, while their ExoCore allows them to summon spirits that will assist them in fights. Alchemists are specialized in tanking the incoming damage to compensate for their lack of speed and agility.

The progression is tied to two in-game currencies: Carats (earned through gameplay) and RC (premium currency purchased with real money, formerly known as Astros).

== History ==
Rumble Fighter is a free to play fighting game published by RedFox Games. It was originally available through OGPlanet for some time, but GamesCampus took over the service, then RedFoxGames took over. Despite the game's age, it still maintains a small, but loyal playerbase. The game is a lobby based PvP brawler, but does have some staged based PvE gameplay.

=== OGPlanet Era (2007–2014) ===
Rumble Fighter was first released in North America under publisher OGPlanet in August 2007. During this period the game developed a competitive community centered around many maps such as “Moonlight Valley”, “Glacier Cove”, and “Dos Palmas”. OGPlanet delivered seasonal content updates and balance patches in collaboration with developer Nimonix.

The rights to Rumble Fighter was purchased by Wemade Entertainment, with the international publication and service transferred to the company on 11 June 2008. The original developer, Gretech, stopped video game development altogether after selling off Rumble Fighter.

=== GamesCampus Era (2014–2016) ===
Following OGPlanet’s closure of its North American service in 2015, the publishing rights were transferred to GamesCampus (operated by OnNet USA). Unfortunately OGP did not transfer any player data to GamesCampus, but GamesCampus did a transfer event where each player could transfer up to 30 items, which maintained gameplay continuity and regular updates for roughly two years. Although the player population declined during this transition, Rumble Fighter retained a loyal fan base that organized independent tournaments and community events.

=== RedFox Games Era (2016–present) ===
In early 2016, the game’s publishing rights moved to RedFox Games, which continues to operate the North American version as of 2026. All account data from GamesCampus were transferred to new servers operated by RedFox, while Nimonix continued as the developer. The publisher implemented new in-game events and balance updates aimed at maintaining long-term stability. Rumble Fighter remains one of the longest-running free-to-play fighting MMOs still in service, supported by a dedicated player community across official forums and Discord servers.

== Reception ==
Rumble Fighter received mixed reviews from independent gaming outlets. Critical Gamer described it as "a very basic online fighter which will dissatisfy if you are expecting anything else... unless you are willing to pump money in to this you will find yourself without many options". MMOS.com praised its "good customization ... good combo system ... good map variety", though it also noted "dated visuals" and "some pay-to-win elements".
