= Lost Saga =

2009 video game

- Developer: Valofe
- Publisher: Valofe
- Platform: Microsoft Windows
- Release: NA: November 17, 2009
- Genre: Fighting
- Mode: Multiplayer

Lost Saga is a free-to-play 3D fighting game developed by I.O. Entertainment. The game was composed of characters from science fiction, culture, and real-world history and offered players the ability to switch characters on the fly to improve gameplay, combinations, and the overall combat experience.

== Development and release ==
In the North American market, Lost Saga was originally launched in 2009, hosted by OGPlanet and playable on Microsoft Windows via a standalone client. The service was transferred to WeMade USA in 2013, who then transferred it over to Z8Games during the same year. Z8Games would eventually cross-launch Lost Saga on Steam, starting on November 27, 2014, with each version of the game being identical to each other.

On September 19, 2019, the service for North American Lost Saga was shut down in its entirety by Z8Games. As there was no immediate notice on whether the service would be transferred to another company, it was assumed Lost Saga's time in the North American region had come to an end. However, in February 2021, Papaya Play announced their own North American Lost Saga launch for April 6, 2021, once again returning Lost Saga to the region. Prior to an official launch, a closed-beta period was run throughout most of February 2021.

It would later be announced on April 6, 2021, less than 24 hours prior to launch, that Papaya Play's version of North American Lost Saga would not be launched, citing issues with the original developers of the game.

Indonesian Lost Saga (ILS) was hosted by Gemscool, until it shut down on June 30, 2020.

In 2020, Wemade Entertainment sold Lost Saga to Valofe, which took over its service management. Lost Saga celebrated its 17th anniversary in 2026.

== Reception ==
In February 2009, reviewing the open beta version, ThisIsGame praised the character action gameplay but criticized the map design.
