= Wemade Entertainment =

South Korean video game developer

Wemade
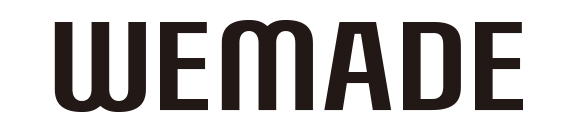
- Native name: 위메이드
- Type: Private company
- Industry: Video games
- Founded: 2000
- Founders: Kwan Ho Park
- Headquarters: Seongnam, South Korea
- Key people: Henry Chang (CEO)
- Products: The Legend of Mir series
- Total assets: ▲KRW₩ 1,875,683M (2024)
- Number of employees: 1600 (4Q 2022)
- Website: www.wemade.com

Wemade Co., Ltd (Korean: 위메이드), formerly Wemade Entertainment Co., Ltd, is a South Korean video game developer, based in Seongnam. They are the creators of the Legend of Mir series of MMORPGs, the two most successful being The Legend of Mir 2, and its sequel The Legend of Mir 3.

According to Forbes, Wemade's founder, Kwan Ho Park, has a net worth of $1.2 billion, as of October 2021.

== History ==
Wemade was founded on February 10, 2000, by the original Legend of Mir 1 developers. They chose the name Wemade Entertainment to acknowledge a copyright infringement lawsuit filed by their South Korean publishing partner Actoz against the Chinese game operator Shanda. Shanda had copied Legend of Mir under the name The World of Legend, prompting the lawsuit. In choosing their company name, the developers were making the point that "We made Legend of Mir". Shanda settled the lawsuit by acquiring Actoz and operating it as Shanda

In 2007, Wemade Entertainment's CEO and founder Kwan-Ho Park hired Kevin "Sookiel" Seo as co-CEO to turn the development company into a publisher and operator of online games in South Korea. Mr. Seo was formerly the CEO of Actoz/Shanda Korea. The company grew from 300 to close to 600 employees as it expanded to provide full hosting services in South Korea.

Today, Wemade Entertainment Co. Ltd. hosts and operates several games in South Korea. This includes games developed by Wemade such as Legend of Mir 2, Legend of Mir 3, Master of Fantasy and Chang Chun (aka Three Kingdom Chronicles). In addition, Wemade also hosts games from other developers including Chaps Online, Tartaros and Avalon. Wemade continues to license these games to other operators in other global territories. Shanda operates Legend of Mir 2 and Chang Chun in Greater China, while Softworld operates Mir 2 in Taiwan. GameFactory operates Rumble Fighter in the United States and Europe.

In the summer of 2008, Wemade established its US headquarters in the Seattle, Washington area. Wemade Entertainment USA, Inc. is a wholly owned subsidiary of the South Korean entity. Headed up by CEO Kisung Kim, the US company is responsible for the Western Games market including Europe and the Americas.

Wemade Entertainment USA, Inc. is currently hosting the North American servers of Lost Saga, a game developed by I.O. Entertainment. It initially planned to transfer accounts from OGPlanet Lost Saga to the new servers (although the accounts were never made available to them to do so) and the game was fully released on May 2, 2013.

On November 20, 2013, Wemade Entertainment USA announced from the North America Lost Saga homepage, that they would be ending Lost Saga's service in North America on December 8, 2013. No answer or reason was given as to why Wemade USA is ending its service of Lost Saga, though there have been rumors. Currently, the company Z8Games will be resuming Lost Saga's services in the North America region on December 18, 2013. With the change of services, all the content obtained while under Wemade USA's service will transfer over when Z8Games resumes when the Lost Saga servers come online, with the transfer period being from December 9 through December 17, 2013. Further information regarding how the transfer will work is currently unknown.

In November 2020, Wemade released Mir 4 in South Korea. The game was made available globally, across 170 countries in 12 languages, on August 26.

In May 2022, Wemade made a strategic investment in Froyo Games – a Singapore-based GameFi platform that is co-developing play-to-earn titles with iCandy Interactive.

In November 2022, Wemade has announced that its investment round raised $46 million from a number of companies, including Microsoft. Microsoft has invested $14.8 million in Wemade by purchasing convertible bonds.

In January 2023, Wemade launched its MMORPG MIR M: Vanguard & Vagabond (MIR M) in more than 170 countries.

'Night Crows', an MMORPG developed by Madngine and published by Wemade, began servicing in South Korea in April 2023. An immediate hit, it topped the sales charts both in Apple App Store and Google Play. The international version will follow in the same year, the company official said.

In August 2025, Wemade invested ₩10 billion (approx. US$7.2 million) to acquire a 25% stake in Studio Rasa, a studio founded by core developers of Neowiz's Lies of P.

== Wemade FOX ==
From 2007 to 2011, Wemade Entertainment operated a professional gaming team called Wemade FOX that maintained high-ranking Counter-Strike, StarCraft: Brood War and Warcraft III players. Sponsored by Pepsi, Skechers, GomTV and Mizuno, Wemade FOX possessed several high-earning players including NaDa and Jang Jae "Moon" Ho. On August 31, 2011, the team was officially shut down, with the former players placed in the care of KeSPA, until new sponsors were to be found.

== WEMIX Coin ==
WEMIX Coin is a blockchain-based cryptocurrency issued by Wemade. It is mainly used within a gaming ecosystem, particularly centered on the Play-to-Earn (P2E) model. Through its mainnet "WEMIX 3.0," it also supports DeFi and NFT services. It previously faced controversy after being delisted from major domestic exchanges. Currently, it is pursuing various projects to expand its global blockchain platform. The Wemix exchange was hacked by a foreign entity on February 28, 2025, seizing 8.6 million assets.
