= Soft-World =

Taiwanese games distributor/developer

Soft-World is a games distributor/developer in Taiwan, based in Taipei, Taiwan. Founded in 1983 and now public, Soft-World currently focuses on MMORPG operation in Taiwan, Hong Kong, Macau, Southeast Asia. It is the largest games software company in Taiwan.
