= List of Shangri-La Frontier episodes =

Key visual for the series

Shangri-La Frontier is an anime television series based on Katarina and Ryosuke Fuji's manga series of the same name, which itself is based on Katarina's web novel of the same name. The anime series is produced by C2C, directed by Toshiyuki Kubooka, assistant directed by Hiroki Ikeshita, supervised and written by Kazuyuki Fudeyasu, character designed by Ayumi Kurashima, and music composed by Monaca's Ryūichi Takada, Kuniyuki Takahashi, and Keiichi Hirokawa. The 25-episode first season aired from October 1, 2023, to March 31, 2024, on the Nichi-5 programming block on all JNN affiliates, including MBS and TBS. For the first cours, the opening theme song is "Broken Games" performed by FZMZ, while the ending theme song is "Ace" performed by Chico. For the second cours, the opening theme song is "Danger Danger" performed by FZMZ feat. Icy, while the second ending theme song is "Gajumaru: Heaven in the Rain" (ガジュマル ～Heaven in the Rain～) performed by Reona.

Immediately following the airing of the first-season finale, a second season was announced, which aired from October 13, 2024, to March 30, 2025, on the same programming block. For the first cours, the opening theme song is "Queen" performed by Lisa, while the ending theme song is "Anya no Dancer: Dancer in the Dark Night" (闇夜のダンサー -Dancer in the Dark Night) performed by Otoha. The second opening theme song is "Frontiers", performed by Awich, and the second ending theme is "RealitYhurts", performed by Cvlte.

A third season was announced immediately following the airing of the second-season finale. It is set to premiere on January 10, 2027, and will run for two consecutive cours. Hiro Ōki directs the third season, with Kubooka serving as chief director and Naoki Kotani as assistant director.

Crunchyroll streams the series outside of East Asia. Muse Communication licensed the series in Southeast Asia. Aniplex collected the anime series on four Blu-ray and DVD disc sets, with two for each season.

== Series overview ==
Season	Episodes	Originally released	
Season	Episodes	First released	Last released
1	25	October 1, 2023	March 31, 2024
2	25	October 13, 2024	March 30, 2025

== Episodes ==
=== Season 1 (2023–24) ===
No. overall	No. in season	Title	Directed by (Note: Production staff information is taken from the ending credits of each episode)	Storyboarded by	Original release date
1	1	"What Do You Play Games For?"; Transliteration: "Anata wa Nan no Tame ni Gēmu o Shimasu ka?" (Japanese: 貴方はなんのためにゲームをしますか？)	Hiro Ohki	Toshiyuki Kubooka	October 1, 2023
In the near future, screen based gaming is replaced with full dive VR games. The market is soon flooded with low quality games filled with glitches known as "trash games". A percentage of players are obsessed with completing trash games despite the glitches. One "trash game hunter" is Rakuro, who goes by his screen name Sunraku. His classmate Rei has a crush on him, but is too nervous to talk to him. After spending weeks completing his latest game, Rakuro suffers mental burnout and is convinced by local shop owner Mana to play a mainstream game instead, completely free of glitches with 30 million players, Shangri-La Frontier. Sticking with his preferred play style Rakuro creates a Wanderer character with twin blades, extra luck bonuses and minimum armor except for swimming shorts and a bird head mask. Choosing to skip the game introduction, Rakuro begins fighting monsters while heading to the starting town Firstia. With increased luck, Rakuro levels up rapidly and is amazed by the glitch free gameplay, eventually deciding to skip Firstia and go to the more advanced town Secondil. The bridge there is blocked by Firstia's area snake boss whom Rakuro attacks with reckless enthusiasm. The introduction Rakuro skipped earlier reveals players may choose any playstyle, including non-combat characters such as academics, merchants and farmers.
2	2	"A Peculiar One"; Transliteration: "Tokui Naru Mono" (Japanese: 特異なる者)	Hiroyuki Morita	Hiroki Ikeshita	October 8, 2023
Rei, already a powerful warrior in Shangri-La, visits Firstia hoping to encounter Rakuro when he starts the game. She is disappointed when he does not appear and assumes Rakuro already visited Firstia and left before she arrived. Despite his expertise of boss fights, Rakuro almost dies, not having known the snake boss usually requires at least three players. His victory promotes him to level 14, but his health continues to drop from the snake venom. He is forced to run all the way to Secondil, where veteran player Reiji helps him register a respawn point before he dies so he will not have to start the game over again. After respawning, Rakuro realizes his swimming shorts make him stand out, and not in a good way, forcing him to buy normal armor, though he keeps the bird mask. Requiring new weapons, the blacksmith sends him to Diremarsh swamp to mine ore, which is more difficult than Rakuro first assumed as the realistic swamp mud slows his movement. Now equipped with Marsh Daggers, Rakuro ignores the Blacksmiths warnings and goes hunting monsters at night. Rei decides to search for Rakuro in Secondil, despite the unlikelihood of a new player making it that far alone. Rakuro encounters Lycagon the Nightslayer, a completely unique monster, which is so high level not one of the games 30 million players have ever defeated it.
3	3	"Black Wolf Nightslayer"; Transliteration: "Kokurou Yashū" (Japanese: 黒狼夜襲)	Hiro Ohki	Michio Fukuda	October 15, 2023
Rei learns Rakuro has already reached Secondil. Other players notice Rei belongs to one of the seven clans formed to hunt the seven unique beasts, in Rei's case her clan hunts Lycagon. Despite executing perfect strikes on Lycagon's critical weak points, Rakuro isn't able to hurt her, and his legs are bitten off, but he swears to find and defeat Lycagon before he completes anymore of the game. Respawning he finds himself afflicted with Lycagon's Curse; he cannot equip armor to his legs or body, though they are now immune to magic, he can no longer fight monsters weaker than himself and NPC's will treat him differently. Plus the curse is permanent unless removed by a Saint or killing Lycagon. Forced to return to his swim shorts, Rakuro suddenly encounters a Unique Scenario, an invitation to the rabbit city Rabituza which he accepts, unaware the recommended skill level is 80. Inside the scenario, he is congratulated by white rabbit named Emul for embodying the spirit of the Vorpal Rabbit; willingly attacking a superior enemy while hitting only the weak points. For Lycagon to curse him was actually Lycagon marking him as a worthy opponent, as such, Rakuro is the first player ever invited to meet Rabbit King Vysache. A brief flashback shows Rei started playing the game on Mana's advice, on the promise Mana would also have Rakuro start playing so Rei could get close to him.
4	4	"A Trash Game Realignment of Elevated Tastes"; Transliteration: "Koeta Kachikan o Kusogē de Susugu" (Japanese: 肥えた価値観をクソゲーで濯ぐ)	Hiroyuki Morita	Noriaki Saito, Toshiyuki Kubooka & Hiroki Ikeshita	October 22, 2023
Rei still cannot locate Rakuro, but Mana convinces her to keep trying. Rakuro reads online walkthroughs and confirms he is definitely the first to meet Vysache. He offers him Vorpal training and equips him with a collar that reduces his experience gains by 50%, but increases his status gains by 250%. Rakuro is unexpectedly invited to BERP, an old trash game used as a meeting spot for hardcore trash hunters, by his online friend Katzo. He is confused Rakuro would play a mainstream game, until Rakuro explains his rivalry with Lycagon. Katzo considers playing Shangri-La too, as does Arthur Pencilgon, another trash hunter and fan of Rakuro. Due to many new players over summer break, Rakuro temporarily leaves the Unique Vorpal Scenario to focus on reaching the next town, Thirdrema. Emul accompanies him as an NPC follower so they can teleport back to Rabituza at any time. Unfortunately, having never been seen before, players quickly take pictures wanting to know how they can get an Emul NPC. Rakuro confirms weak monsters now flee from him. He chooses to instead defeat the area boss, Mud Digger, so he can travel to Thirdrema. Unfortunately, Mud Digger lives in a swamp which slows Rakuro's movements again. That night, Rakuro has a nightmare Emul is a demon eating his character when he logs out.
5	5	"Lo, Thou Art Assailed on All Sides"; Transliteration: "Kakute Nanji, Sōdō no Yaribusuma ni Kakomaren" (Japanese: かくて汝、騒動の槍衾に囲まれん)	Yoshitaka Nagaoka	Takebumi Anzai	October 29, 2023
Rakuro tries to rely on skills but almost dies, until Emul saves him, realizing he was being so used to solo playing, he forgot Emul was his party member and can help fight. After dealing Mud-Digger, a lot of damage Rakuro is thrown into the air to die from the extreme fall which cannot be avoided by any skill. Luckily, Emul teleports him on top of Mud-Digger, turning his fall into an overpowered headbutt that kills Mud-Digger instantly. Rakuro is pleased by the victory but disappointed in himself for using Emul since she is stronger than him. Approaching Thirdrema, Emul disguises as a human girl, though Rakuro only wearing shorts still draws unwanted attention. Unfortunately the photograph of him has spread and players now know he has a unique NPC and has fought Lycagon, bringing him to the attention of Psyger, a member of Rei's Lycagon hunter clan, as well as many members of Ashura Kai, an assassin clan that kill other players for fun. Rakuro is accosted by Animalia, an animal obsessed player who wants her own vorpal rabbit NPC. Suddenly, they are ambushed by Arthur Pencilgon, a level 99 player killer, who has come for Rakuro.
6	6	"The Writing Tool Knight-Queen"; Transliteration: "Hikkiyōgu no Kishi-ō" (Japanese: 筆記用具の騎士王)	Takaaki Nagano	Takayuki Inagaki	November 5, 2023
Rakuro recognizes Arthur as a fellow trash game hunter. They met in a post-apocalyptic trash game where gamers often ignored the impossible main quests to focus on fighting each other for resources. Arthur fought her way to becoming queen and the games unofficial final boss, the Dystopian Empress. In the end, Rakuro killed her in a suicide mission, beginning their unusual friendship/rivalry. Arthur has travelled all the way from the 50th city Fifticia to kill him. Animalia reveals Arthur is the level 99 second-in-command of Ashura Kai, specializing in assassinating player's even higher level than herself. As they fight, Arthur passes a demand from Ashura Kai's leader to publicly share how to access the unique scenario for vorpal rabbit NPC's. Emul cannot sustain her human form and reverts back to a rabbit. To protect Emul, Animalia attacks Arthur, allowing Rakuro to dash for Thirdrema's gate to establish a respawn point, but is stopped by Arthur's fellow assassins. Animalia is defeated and begins dying of poison magic. From nowhere, Rakuro is rescued by Rei, having finally learned his location from her sister, Psyger-100, from the photograph of him with Lycagon's mark. Arthur is delighted to see Rei, whom she knows in-game as Psyger-0, but the distraction lets Animalia attack her with her unique magic spell.
7	7	"Remnant of the Divinity: The Aberrant Loser"; Transliteration: "Shiindai no Zanshi, Mōshū no Haisha" (Japanese: 神代の残滓、妄執の敗者)	Hiroyuki Morita	Yoshimasa Hiraike	November 12, 2023
Animalia's spell kills both herself and Arthur, surprising the assassins so much Rakuro is able to escape into Thirdrema. Rei is ecstatic Rakuro briefly spoke to her, but blames the assassins for the conversation not lasting longer, and kills them all. Arthur takes her loss good naturedly and invites Rakuro to talk later in the post-apocalyptic game, along with his other online friend Katzo. Rakuro teleports to Rabituza to begin playing the unique scenario. For his first training session he is forced to fight a group of Packhounds, all level 65 or higher. Rei decides next time she sees Rakuro in-game she will send him a friend request. After dying seven times in a row, Rakuro figures out the Packhounds attack patterns and kills them. His opponents grow progressively stronger; a Tentacle Parasite, a Goblin Berserker, a Dino-boar, a Toxic Eagle, an Armored Larva, an Execu-panther, a Twinhead Tiger and a Golem. This only promotes him to level 31 due to the reduced experience points of the vorpal collar. Vysache turns up to watch the tenth fight against a monster he caught just for Rakuro, Aberrant Woodmage level 120, a tree-type sorcerer so strong Vysache only demands Rakuro survive 5 minutes in order to win the round.
8	8	"The 300-Limit Pandemonium"; Transliteration: "Sanbyaku Rimitto Kyōsō Kyoku" (Japanese: 300リミット狂騒曲)	Akihiko Ota	Shinji Ishihira	November 19, 2023
Rakuro discovers the Woodmage is impervious to physical attacks, so all he can do is dodge the attacks. After two minutes, Rakuro starts to suffer mental strain and considers just dying as there are no penalties for dying in training matches. He then feels disgust at himself, having grown used to always taking the easiest path to victory in trash games. He successfully steals Woodmage's staff, removing his ability to use spells. Dodging until the time expires becomes easier and Rakuro wins. Woodmage angrily breaks the rules and tries to kill him, but Vysache kills Woodmage and gives Rakuro his reward, a title as an honorary Rabituzan citizen and removal of the troublesome vorpal collar. Rakuro is disappointed, until his citizenship unlocks another unique scenario, the Vorpal Epic. As it has complicated instructions that require researching Shangri-La's highly detailed world history, Rakuro decides to play the main game and go exploring for a while. While unable to equip clothes to his torso, Emul's brother Peatz gives Rakuro a Keffiyeh headdress with full body robe, so assassins will not recognize him. While deciding which city to visit next; Fourfolkshire, Fivelle or Sixenveldt, Rakuro spots Rei watching him ominously.
9	9	"A Dazzling Sea of Trees"; Transliteration: "Hanayaka Naru Ki no Umi" (Japanese: 華やかなる樹の海)	Mitsutoshi Satō	Takayuki Inagaki	November 26, 2023
Arthur is disgusted by the weakness of Ashura Kai and their leader Orcelott; they used to be proud assassins until the game began applying penalties to murderers. Now they are just another clan collecting experience and hoarding equipment. Ashura Kai is also the only clan who know the location of unique monster, Wethermon the Tombguard, but dare not attack him in case they lose their valuable equipment. Arthur decides to kill Wethermon herself. Rei surprises Rakuro with a friend request. Still unaware Psyger-0 is Rei, Rakuro assumes she is trying to manipulate him for access to the unique scenario and accepts the request, planning to manipulate her instead. Having become online friends, Rei accepts he prefers to play solo and lets him travel to Fourfolkshire alone, planning to talk to him later now she has his contact information. Passing through the Prismatic Forest with Emul, Rakuro is amazed by the variety of insect type monsters, even witnessing a battle between Empire Bees and a Quad Beetle. After killing the weakened Beetle for its drop items, Rakuro sets out to find the area boss, Clown Spider.
10	10	"Let's Go Tomb Raiding!!"; Transliteration: "Yarō ze, Haka Arashi!!" (Japanese: やろうぜ、墓荒らし!!)	Yoshitaka Nagaoka	Noriaki Saito, Toshiyuki Kubooka & Hiroki Ikeshita	December 3, 2023
Rakuro is unable to enter the boss arena as other adventurers are currently attempting to beat it, so Rakuro must wait his turn. After watching those adventurers die, Rakuro confronts Clown Spider and requests Emul not to assist him. After knocking Clown Spider from its web, he weakens it by dropping boulders on it, then he stabs its critical weak point and beats it without taking any damage himself. Sunraku receives an email from Arthur, as does Katzo, who recently started playing the game and has already defeated Mud-Digger. Arthur invites them to help her defeat Wethermon in two weeks, the day after a massive update that adds new missions, characters and areas to explore. Rakuro is suspicious of her motives. In the real world, Rei is able to speak to Rakuro, who barely remembers her name or that they attend the same school. Before she can reveal she is Psyger-0, Rakuro rushes off to meet Arthur, but Rei considers talking to him at all a big success. Emul is terrified Rakuro plans to fight Wethermon and rushes to tell Vysache. Rakuro later learns why from Arthur; in Shangri-La if an NPC dies they are dead and gone permanently, Emul will never respawn and her role in the unique Vorpal scenario will be over.
11	11	"The Glimmer of Truth"; Transliteration: "Makoto no Kagayaki" (Japanese: まことのかがやき)	Teppei Taketani	Takebumi Anzai	December 10, 2023
Vysache is unhappy with Rakuro's plans, but Rakuro explains Ashura Kai are exploiting a game mechanic; harvesting experience by starting a fight with Wethermon, then running away without actually fighting. Arthur plans to give Wethermon the fight he deserves. Vysache feels sympathy for Wethermon, cursed with being undead and unable to join his wife in the afterlife, so instead Wethermon guards her tomb. Granting him death is therefore honorable and true to the Vorpal Soul. Vysache takes Rakuro's Vorpal Chopper knives and personally "ascends" them, combining Rakuro's experience of fighting Lycagon with the armor of the Quad Beetle, resulting in the Vorpal knives Moonblade (Waxing) and Moonblade (Waning), one which sacrifices health for powerful strikes, and one that restores health at the same speed as it is lost. Unfortunately, he must be level 50 to use them, meaning he needs to go up 19 levels in only two weeks. Arthur sends him and Katzo to train in the futuristic Iron Ruins of the Divinity near Sixenveldt, though Rakuro is confused when Arthur gives him a fishing rod, claiming he will definitely need it to survive the ruins.
12	12	"Regrets Always Lie in the Past"; Transliteration: "Kōkai wa Itsumo Kako ni Iru" (Japanese: 後悔はいつも過去にいる)	Kenta Kushiya	Yoshimasa Hiraike	December 17, 2023
After defeating sentry robots, Rakuro and Katzo follow Arthurs' complicated map to a hidden room within the ruins rumored to be tailored for fast levelling. Emul is amazed by Rakuro's explanation that Katzo is a man in a female character body. They find the room, Tearlight Lake, which according to Arthur contains the monster Lifestide Lake Serpent. If caught with a fishing rod it bestows a lot of experience points. After dragging Lifestide to the surface, Rakuro reveals his temporary weapons, Empire Bee Twinblades, made for him by Emul's sister Bilac until he can use the Moonblades. After defeating Lifestide, Katzo reveals Skill-Linking, a core game mechanic along with the ability to get a job or join a guild, all which Rakuro missed by skipping the tutorial in Firstia, making the game almost unnecessarily difficult for him. After several days, Rakuro and Katzo reach level 42 and 40, respectively, though Rakuro hides his foolishly skipping Firstia from Arthur to avoid embarrassment. Arthur gives them until full moon, the one time a month they can talk to unique ghost NPC Setsuna of Bygone Days, who provides access to Wethermon.
13	13	"Only Resentments About the End of Life Remain"; Transliteration: "Miren Dake ga Soko ni Iru" (Japanese: 未練だけがそこにいる)	Hiro Ohki	Takebumi Anzai	December 24, 2023
Arthur leads them to Setsuna's secret hiding place in the Prismatic Forest. She explains Wethermon blames himself for her death which occurred during a silly marital argument, so he sealed her grave behind a barrier powered by moon magic, hence why it is only accessible once a month when the moon is dark. She hopes they defeat Wethermon so they can be together again. From her modern clothing and language, Rakuro suspects her backstory involved dying in the games Age of Divinity, and wonders if she knows anything about the Vorpal Scenaria. Rakuro is aware Arthur's real identity is Towa, a supermodel constantly hounded by her fans, and suspects it causes her to feel sympathy for Setsuna. Based on Wethermon's fighting style, Rakuro skips levelling up and instead trains his own play style not in Shangri-La, but in the BERP trash game. There he meets Dragonfly, a first time novice gamer. Agreeing to a duel, Rakuro shows Dragonfly how to take advantage of glitches. Elsewhere, Rei attempts to write a letter to Rakuro asking to join his party and play together, but everything she writes embarrasses her so she does not send him any of the letters.
14	14	"Squish"; Transliteration: "Puchitto" (Japanese: ぷちっと)	Yūma Imura	Noriaki Saito	January 7, 2024
Dragonfly eventually wins one duel using a double-punch glitch Rakuro and other players have not seen before, impressing them as no one has discovered a new BERP glitch in years. In exchange, Rakuro shows her a glitch he discovered; Doppleganger, which creates a glitch clone of himself as an ally in duels. Dragonfly decides to invent a name for her new glitch. Returning to Shangri-La, Rakuro decides to try Skill-Linking by visiting one of Emul's triplet siblings, Elke the Skill Gardener in Rabituza. He acquires six linked skills and a Vorpal Moonblade skill, not initially realizing Elke is completely money obsessed, and convinces him to spend almost all his coin. Arthur reveals the next problem; since Ashura Kai use Wethermon to harvest experience, there will definitely be Ashura Kai members there on the day of the duel unwilling to let Wethermon actually die. Luckily, a new update has placed a restriction on assassins; if an assassin dies, all their accumulated money and some equipment gets transferred to whoever killed them, leaving them totally harmless when they respawn. Therefore, before they can fight Wethermon, Arthur decides they must completely destroy Ashura Kai by assassinating all its members.
15	15	"Putting Feelings Into a Moment, Part 1"; Transliteration: "Setsuna ni Omoi o Komete – Sono Ichi" (Japanese: 刹那に想いを込めて 其の一)	Masakazu Yoshimoto	Takayuki Inagaki	January 21, 2024
Shangri-La undergoes a major update with new quests, maps and a new job title. Players notice all shops are sold out of resurrection items. Rei finally sends her letter to Rakuro inviting him to explore the update, but she then receives a message from Psyger-100 that someone revealed the location of Ashura-Kai's headquarters, so players are organizing a massive revenge attack. Rei is forced to quickly send a letter cancelling Rakuro's invite. Both letters leave Rakuro confused. Emul reveals she cannot go with him against Wethermon, but gives him a mysterious good luck necklace she made. Ashura-Kai are wiped out by a massive army led by Rei, so Orcelott and four surviving assassins flee to Wethermon's arena, but find the entrance closed as Arthur, Rakuro and Katzo are already inside. Orcelott furiously realizes his sister, Arthur, betrayed Ashura-Kai. As they confront Wethermon, a Samurai in futuristic armor, they carry out their plan. Arthur has determined Wethermon varies his fighting style in stages, so the only way to win is surviving all the stages and hope Wethermon surrenders. Rakuro takes the first stage which lasts 10 minutes, but he is killed. Katzo quickly resurrects him, revealing it was Arthur who bought every resurrection item from every town in preparation for the battle.
16	16	"Putting Feelings Into a Moment, Part 2"; Transliteration: "Setsuna ni Omoi o Komete – Sono Ni" (Japanese: 刹那に想いを込めて 其の二)	Hiroki Ikeshita	Michio Fukuda	January 28, 2024
Arthur hands Rakuro and Katzo the Tearjewel of Rebirth (four per person since she bought twelve for extras and emergencies) before the battle with Wethermon, and the Divine Lifesalve that lets them revive at half their max HP (five per person). She relays the plan they'll follow in order to conquer Wethermon. After they survive the battle for ten minutes, Wethermon summons his horse, a tactical mount named Kirin. Together they attempt to prevent Wethermon from mounting Kirin by Katzo attracting its attention and Rakuro continuing to fight Wethermon. In Phase two, they have to survive for another ten minutes. When Arthur realizes that Rakuro and Katzo are in trouble, she uses the Reward Scale, a very difficult to acquire item she borrowed from NPCs, which allows one to sacrifice expensive items in return for the ability to bestow temporary stat boosts. She spends he whole fortune for 300 points, giving 100 to Rakuro's Luck and Stamina and he succeeds in taking away Wethermon's sword. After surviving 20 minutes in the battle against Wethermon, Arthur explains the last time Ashura Kai reached Phase three in the battle against Wethermon, he unleashed a massive instant kill explosion. This time though she knows Wethermon is an undead, so as he prepares his explosion she douses him with holy water.
17	17	"Putting Feelings Into a Moment, Part 3"; Transliteration: "Setsuna ni Omoi o Komete – Sono San" (Japanese: 刹那に想いを込めて 其の三)	Kenichi Domon	Takayuki Inagaki & Hiroyuki Taiga	February 4, 2024
As Wethermon burns, Kirin reconfigures itself into a robot to fight Katzo and Arthur who prevent it helping Wethermon. Rakuro fights Wethermon alone, but decides just surviving another ten minute stage is boring, instead he wants to really defeat him. As such, he equips a real helmet of Quad Beetle armor and his Moonblades since Wethermon's armor is crumbling from the holy water, meaning he can now take damage. Rakuro's critical attacks succeed in causing Wethermon to fall to the ground. Arthur gives Katzo an item that boosts him to level 99 temporarily, in exchange for dropping his real level from 50 to 20 afterwards, hoping to destroy Kirin, much to his chagrin. Wethermon notices the good luck necklace Rakuro received from Emul and abruptly stops fighting. He mentions someone named Alice, an ID key fragment and Shangri-La's true frontier. They resume fighting only Wethermon is now far quicker, more savage and reveals multiple attacks he would not used before. His next attack destroys Rakuro's helmet and kills him, but Wethermon fails to notice Rakuro had already set up another resurrection tool in advance to revive himself instantly.
18	18	"Putting Feelings Into a Moment, Part 4"; Transliteration: "Setsuna ni Omoi o Komete – Sono Shi" (Japanese: 刹那に想いを込めて 其の四)	Hironori Tanaka	Hironori Tanaka	February 11, 2024
Wethermon begins using the same set of multiple attacks repeatedly, ending with the same unavoidable instant death attack, claiming he will not fall until Rakuro surpasses his ultimate move. Rakuro quickly runs out of full resurrection items, leaving only the 50% health recovery items. Rakuro deduces the only way to win is to somehow perfectly parry Wethermon's unavoidable instant kill attack. Arthur and Katzo manage to shatter the armor around Kirin's waist, exposing its critical weak point. Combining both their strongest attacks they pierce the weak point and Kirin is destroyed, allowing them to collapse from exhaustion. Rakuro, with no health items remaining, has only one chance for a perfect parry or the whole battle will be a failure. For luck he dons his original bird mask while Wethermon begins his unavoidable attack. Fusing his Moonblades into the single weapon Twin Moon, Rakuro increases his chance of performing both a perfect parry and critical damage. He also stabs himself, dropping his health to 1, allowing him to use a skill to increase his speed. With one perfectly timed move Wethermon's unavoidable attack is parried, snapping his sword and shattering his armor wide open, signaling his defeat. Wethermon congratulates Rakuro on his victory as the arena fills with swirling cherry blossoms.
19	19	"The World Progresses, the Heroes Are Revealed"; Transliteration: "Susumu Sekai, Akasa Reru Eiyū" (Japanese: 進む世界、明かされる英雄)	Mitsutoshi Satō	Takayuki Inagaki	February 18, 2024
Wethermon praises Rakuro for his skills and names him Descendant of the Frontier, before crumbling to dust over Setsuna's grave. Setsuna's ghost thanks them and reveals she is not actually the real Setsuna, but is a perfect copy left behind by the real Setsuna to help Wethermon find peace, hence her title Setsuna of Bygone Days. Now that he can rest in peace, Setsuna's fate is to disappear, but first she tasks them with discovering the truth behind the world by finding Bahamut, though what this is she leaves unclear. The game announces to all players the first defeat of a Unique Monster and the start of the next stage of Shangri-La's World Story, which even the games lore researchers did not know existed. Furious at being betrayed, Orcelott and his surviving assassins attack, hoping to take whatever loot they got from Wethermon's defeat, but Arthur activates a "friend summoning" ability for help, which summons Rakuro's friend Rei. Orcelot and the assassins are killed, passing all Ashura-Kai's remaining rare items to Arthur. As the only assassin left, Arthur asks Rei to kill her in a duel to atone for her many kills and end Ashura-Kai forever, which Rei accepts.
20	20	"Current Situations and Next Steps"; Transliteration: "Sorezore no Ima to Ji" (Japanese: それぞれの今と次)	Masahiko Suzuki	Takebumi Anzai	February 25, 2024
After batting and killing Arthur, Rei asks if Rakuro and Arthur are lovers and is relieved they are not. The friend-summoning expires, sending Rei back where she came from before she can ask to join his party. Rakuro retrieves one of Arthurs swords Rei forgot to pick up. At Utopia Entertainment, the company that created Shangri-La Frontier, everyone is panicked as the World Story called for Wethermon to be the fourth unique monster killed, not the first, especially the lead world designers Tsukuyo and Ritsu, and marketing executive Sakai. Vysache is satisfied at Wethermon finally moving on and offers Rakuro knowledge of the truth behind the world, though he requires Rakuro fetch a receiver, a positioner and a transmitter from a place called Lightless Barrens, though he gives no indication where in Shangri-La this is. Rakuro finds beating Wethermon made him level 78. He also received the book Wethermon's Truth, a biography of Wethermon's life, and a list of his unique sword moves, though Rakuro must acquire weapons from the Age of Divinity before learning them. He also receives a unique item storage that will protect his items even if he dies. He also finds the storage space already contains armors, weapons, vehicles and other items, much to his confusion. Starting over from level 1, Arthur says goodbye to Setsuna before setting off to find Bahamut. Out in the wilderness, Lycagon continues to wait for Rakuro.
21	21	"Errands, Cultivation, and Game Progress"; Transliteration: "Otsukai to Ikusei to Kōryaku to" (Japanese: お使いと育成と攻略と)	Yuri Hagiwara	Yoshimasa Hiraike	March 3, 2024
Examining the items in the Inventoria, Arthur determines none of the armors will function without a "none-standard Ether Reactor", and without the armor, they can't equip any of the weapons. Katzo reveals he received one reactor as loot for defeating Kirin, but it is broken and none of the NPC blacksmiths can repair it. Rakuro suspects Vysache could repair it but before handing it over, Katzo demands to know how to access the vorpal unique scenario. Rakuro reveals about fighting Lycagon for 5 minutes without taking damage and Katzo reluctantly concludes he couldn't manage it anyway. Arthur reveals via a complex series of loopholes she managed to keep several items despite Rei killing her, namely the Reward Scales, Wethermon's biography, Setsuna's brooch and her favorite weapon. Having seen how much killing a unique monster is worth, they decide to form a clan, the Wolf-gang, that focuses on hunting all the unique monsters instead of just one like other hunter clans. A representative of the Lycagon clan tracks them down but they flee before he can ask questions. When he tries to find Vysache, he is nowhere to be found, so Rakuro asks if Bilac is interested in training to obtain the title Ancient Craftsmen needed to repair the reactor. She agrees after much persuading.
22	22	"The Walking Air Purifier"; Transliteration: "Wōkingu obu za Ea Kurīnā (Note: Walking of the Air Cleaner)" (Japanese: ウォーキング・オブ・ザ・エアクリーナー)	Hiro Ohki	Takebumi Anzai	March 10, 2024
To become an Ancient Craftsman Bilac requires a working Legacy Weapon from the Age of Divinity and a Magic Application Unit from the Road of Past Glories. Fortunately, the katana Harbinger is available in the Inventoria, but as joint-owners of Inventoria Rakuro needs Arthur and Katzo's permission for Bilac to dismantle it. Rakuro decides to head for Past Glories first, though it is a long distance away somewhere between the towns Eighdold and Eleventar. By chance, Lightless Barrens is close to Eleventar where Rakuro needs to find the receiver, positioner and transmitter for Vysache. They pass through Fourfolkshire into Ancient Soul Canyon where Lycagon's Curse protects him from miasma and repels undead monsters. After working together to defeat a Dullahan General Rakuro loots its rusty sword Decapitator and gives it to Bilac for repair. From there they move on trying to find the area boss hiding somewhere in the miasma.
23	23	"Bird with Rabbits vs. Skeletal Choir"; Transliteration: "Tori uizu Usagis bāsasu Gasshō Sharekōbe" (Japanese: 鳥 with 兎s vs 合唱髑髏)	Michita Shiraishi	Takayuki Inagaki	March 17, 2024
Rakuro is intrigued that the canyons upper cliffs are infested with Crystal Scorpions even Bilac is afraid of as scorpions are often over level 100. Eventually they confront the area boss Humming Lich, which can only be damaged by holy weapons, which Rakuro does not have. Bilac comes up with a solution, so Rakuro and Emul keep the Lich distracted but panic when it splits into 7 smaller skeletons. By polishing the Decapitator sword with holy water Bilac removes the rust and gives it a holy attribute which also makes it very fragile. Figuring out each skeletons attack patterns Rakuro decapitates 6 of them then works with Bilac to decapitate the original Lich with Decapitator only just avoiding being destroyed itself. With Lich beaten the miasma vanishes, allowing them to leave the canyon and enter Eighthold. Bilac and Emul teleport to Rabituza to rest while Rakuro explores Eighthold, but as soon as they are gone he recklessly dashes back to the canyon, unable to resist the urge to fight a Crystal Scorpion.
24	24	"Rare Items, Worth More Than Life Itself"; Transliteration: "Reā Itemu wa Inochi Yori mo Omoi" (Japanese: レアアイテムは命よりも重い)	Daisuke Chiba	Takebumi Anzai	March 24, 2024
Rakuro climbs the canyon walls and finds the Crystal Nest Cliffs. Immediately he is attacked by a gigantic scorpion made entirely from crystal and within moments he is surrounded by dozens of scorpions and killed. He refuses to accept defeat, at least until he has gotten something out of it. Returning to the nest he locates an unusual deposit of black crystals which he manages to collect before being killed again. The crystal turns out to be Aroncaleth Lapis which has high concentrations of magic. Still unsatisfied he returns again with a plan. He first tricks the scorpions into running into each other, shattering their hard shells, then teleports into the Inventoria as an emergency refuge. Then after the scorpions leave he teleports out again and collects the broken shells. Repeating this he collects vast amounts of materials but refuses to give up until he has collected one of their stingers as a trophy. With careful timing he tricks multiple scorpions into targeting the stinger of a single scorpion, snapping it off. Unfortunately, he mistimes his next attack and just misses grabbing the stinger before he is killed again. Despondent, he decides to quit temporarily and instead show the materials to Bilac. Emul worries Rakuro might be going mad with loot lust.
25	25	"Those Who Illuminate The World's Darkness"; Transliteration: "Sekai no Kurayami o Hiraku Mono" (Japanese: 世界の暗闇を拓く者)	Yoshihiko Iwata	Naoto Uchida	March 31, 2024
Bilac admits crystals are better suited to magic jewelry than weapons. Fortunately, she knows one of the best jewelers for the job, D'Arnyaata. Unfortunately, to get the jewels to D'Arnyaata, Bilac is forced to summon hyperactive Cait-Sith Aramiys, Vice-Captain of Cazzeria, the Cait-Sith Kingdom. Needing rest, Rakuro logs out and ends up ignoring messages from Arthur and Katzo to meet for something important. He returns to Bilac and discovers that, since Cait-Sith's are notorious for stealing from customers, she told Cazzeria's king all about Rakuro, who responded by offering him all of Cazzeria's support in the form of Aramiys as a party member. Bilac thus explains to Rakuro that due to being recognized by Lycagon and slaying Wethermon, in political terms Rakuro is now as powerful as an entire kingdom, which has some advantages, but comes with the risk if he is not careful it is possible to start a full scale war by accident. Rakuro decides to finally explore Eighthold, but even disguised he is immediately recognized by a Magical Girl with a deep male voice who turns out to be Professor, master of The Library, the player clan that collects the lore and history of Shangri-La. As the first person in history to defeat a Unique Monster he hopes to form a partnership with Rakuro to discover the real meaning behind the world of Shangri-La Frontier.

=== Season 2 (2024–25) ===
No. overall	No. in season	Title	Directed by	Storyboarded by	Original release date
26	1	"Half-Naked Birdman and the Gang in Golem Paradise"; Transliteration: "Hanra to Yukaina Nakama-tachi in Gōremu Paradaisu" (Japanese: 半裸と愉快な仲間達inゴーレムパラダイス)	Hiro Ohki	Yoshimasa Hiraike	October 13, 2024
Rakuro, Emul, Bilac and Aramiys reach the Road of Past Glories underneath an artificial construct from the Age of Divinity that resembles a giant ribcage. As they enter, they are attacked by a Machine Golem which Aramiys destroys. Before they can recover, they are attacked by a giant Cannonball Golem, which constantly spits out bombs. Rakuro notices the bombs prefer chasing Emul and Aramiys due to their much higher level combat abilities, so he and Bilac go after the Golem, which is easily defeated using the new and improved Decapitator from the Dullahan General. From its body, Rakuro loots a Blast Soil Idol, a tiny golem that will explode like a grenade if hit hard enough. Reasoning that the Age of Divinity ended due to war, Rakuro examines the area as though it were a battlefield, which points him directly to the underground manufacturing workshop where the Magic Application Unit should be. Unknown to Rakuro, they are being followed by Arthur and Katzo, who decides to ambush Rakuro for ignoring their messages and going on a quest behind their backs. In the real world, Mana tries to help Rei speak to Rakuro again by selling them both copies of a brand new trash game, even telling Rei to get on with it already.
27	2	"The Uncompromising Gatekeeper"; Transliteration: "Yūzū Shirazu no Monban" (Japanese: 融通知らずの門番)	Masahiko Suzuki	Takebumi Anzai	October 20, 2024
Arthur and Katzo capture Rakuro, having figured out he was up to something by all the crystal scorpion loot in Inventoria. They agree to help find the Magic Application Unit, since it will help them use the inoperable items in Inventoria. They descend into the Workshop and defeat a Security Robot. Arthur reveals the weapon she had to abuse loopholes to keep after her earlier death, Holy Spear Caledfwlch, one of only 5 hero weapons within Shangri-La. The Workshop turns out to be a scientific laboratory. Rakuro finds a hologram of a monster and wonders if it was responsible for destroying the civilizations of the Age of Divinity. After finding the Unit Arthur and Katzo send it away with Bilac so she can start work on becoming an Ancient Craftsman. They then force Rakuro to delay his Unique Scenario as they need him for Wolf-Gang business in Eighthold. That business turns out to be Animalia and her clan of animal lovers SF-Zoo, all wanting their own Emul rabbit NPC's. As they could not find Rakuro to ask him, they have become a feral mob constantly harassing Arthur and Katzo. Now seeing Rakuro, the mob swarms him instead, giving Arthur and Katzo some much needed peace.
28	3	"Accelerating Meetings, Surging Desire, and the Start of Various Threads"; Transliteration: "Kasoku Suru Kaigi, Hotobashi Yokubō, Soshite Sorezore no Itoguchi" (Japanese: 加速する会議、迸る(ほとばし)欲望、そしてそれぞれの糸口)	Hide Yamamoto	Takayuki Inagaki	October 27, 2024
Realizing Arthur and Katzo sold him out to SF-Zoo, Rakuro throws Emul to them, since she is who they want and unwilling to take the heat. Psyger-100 and Professor arrive for a meeting between the clans Wolf-gang, Schwarz Vulf, SF-Zoo and The Library. Psyger-100 wants information on Lycagon and is willing to remove Lycagon's Curse from Rakuro in exchange. Rakuro is reluctant to reveal Rabituza to SF-Zoo in case it causes trouble for Vysache. Instead he only talks about Lycagon and they theorize Legendary Beasts might only be beatable if you start their related Unique Scenario first; such as with Wethermon and Setsuna's unique quest. Professor reveals the only other Legendary Beasts known about; the kraken Ctarnidd of the Abyss, golden dragon Siegwurm the Sky Ruler, and Orchestra the Doom Echo, species unknown. Arthur sells Wethermon's biography to Professor, for 100,000,000 gold. Rakuro informs Psyger-100 everything he remembers about Lycagon. Animalia demands to know how SF-Zoo can get full access to Rabituza. Rakuro is astounded access to Rabituza is common via the quest Tour de Rabituza, but after the quest ends players are never allowed back in, so SF-Zoo only wants to know how to be allowed in whenever they want. Emul replies that permanent access could only be granted by her eldest brother Aydward, King of Rabituza. Arthur requests to form an alliance between their four clans.
29	4	"When Humanity Dreams of the Impossible and Takes to the Skies"; Transliteration: "Hito wa Fukanō o Yume ni Miru, Iza Sora o Aruku Toki" (Japanese: 人は不可能を夢に見る、いざ空を歩く時)	Yoshihiko Iwata	Takebumi Anzai	November 3, 2024
The clans agree to the alliance. Katzo believes Rakuro made a mistake giving away information on Lycagon. Arthur is wary of SF-Zoo having access to Rabituza, which could be disastrous. Rakuro returns to Crystal Nest Cliffs, still determined to loot a scorpion stinger. Unfortunately, his trick of teleporting into Inventoria fails, the scorpions kill him and he realizes the game admins have discovered his trick and made the scorpions smarter to compensate. He soon discovers a new way to potentially beat them but must level up first to unlock the jumping ability, Sky-Walker. Bilac discovers the Magic Application Unit is actually a helmet which allows her to understand how Legacy Weapons were forged. She hopes to make a new Legacy Weapon from Scorpion crystals. Having grown bored of twin-blades, Rakuro asks her for something different. Rakuro sells a doll dropped by the Cannonball Golem to Peatz and is astounded to learn it is modelled on Denier Sword, a valuable collector's piece. With the money Rakuro buys Emul a new spellbook they test fighting another Dullahan General. This allows him to unlock Sky-Walker. The next time he enters Crystal Nests he entices a dozen scorpions to chase him. Using Sky-Walker he jumps to safety, but the scorpions cannot stop in time and fall off the cliff to their deaths.
30	5	"The Impetus of Hunger; the Persistence of Thirst"; Transliteration: "Sono Shōdō wa, Kiga – Sono Shūnen wa, Katsubō" (Japanese: その衝動は、飢餓 その執念は、渇望)	Kazunobu Shimizu	Takebumi Anzai	November 10, 2024
Despite the scorpions deaths, Rakuro is confused why his status remains as In Combat. He is suddenly attacked by an immense gold Crystal Scorpion; a rare subspecies known as a Goldy that preys on the others. Despite possessing weaker armor, Goldy is larger, faster and smarter. Rakuro narrowly avoids being sprayed by poison by entering Inventoria. This gives Rakuro an idea so he equips his Empire Bee blades which emit corrosive acid to damage Goldy between its armor plates. Goldy heals itself by absorbing energy from the moon. Rakuro remembers that the moon was also important to the scenario of Wethermon and Setsuna, and starts to wonder if there is something special about Shangri-La's moon. Rakuro stops Goldy healing by attacking before it can absorb the moonlight, blinds its eyes and successfully cuts off its stinger which he sends into Inventoria as a trophy. Their battle lures in more scorpions that attack Goldy, severing one of its claws. With his Blast Soil Idol Rakuro severs the other claw. Now defenseless, Rakuro pierces Goldy's skull, defeating it and instantly jumps 20 levels from 79 to 99. Rakuro decides Shangri-La Frontier is the greatest game he has ever played.
31	6	"After the Fierce Battle, Despair"; Transliteration: "Gekitō no Hate ni, Zetsubō" (Japanese: 激闘の果てに、絶望)	Daisuke Chiba	Yoshimasa Hiraike, Takeshi Manabe & Daisuke Chiba	November 17, 2024
Bilac, now promoted to Ancient Craftsman, is astounded when Rakuro gives her the Goldy claws, stinger and crystal heart to make weapons. She reveals she has repaired the Ether Reactor so he rushes into Inventoria to try the Legacy Armor. Unfortunately, he realizes all his work has been for nothing since even with the Reactor, he still cannot equip armor due to Lycagon's curse. Realizing Arthur and Katzo wouldn't have this issue, Rakuro decides to keep the Reactor to ensure they can't try any of the armor before he does, since he has done most of the work for it. He logs out for a while and, after arguing with his sister Rumi, decides to just play another game, Nephilim Hollow, where players pilot giant robots in duels. Piloting his robot Kingfisher, Rakuro is challenged by Super Ballman in his robot Bound Dog, since Rakuro humiliated him in a duel the last time he played the game. Despite having to relearn how to pilot Kingfisher, Rakuro wins the duel. Rakuro is then challenged by his old nemesis Rust, Nephilim Hollow's long time reigning champion. The last time they met Rakuro just barely fought her to a draw, leaving the championship undecided.
32	7	"The Wings in a Draw"; Transliteration: "Sōyoku Aiutsu" (Japanese: 双翼相打つ)	Hiro Ohki	Takayuki Inagaki	November 24, 2024
Rust challenges him to a duel with her robot Crimson Twinewing. Rust destroys Rakuro's Kingfisher, but is unsatisfied since Rakuro is both out of practise and has not updated Kingfisher with new parts either. Rakuro promises to update Kingfisher for another rematch. Ballman points out Rust hasn't updated Twinewing since their last match either, since she stubbornly keeps the same robot until someone beats her. Ballman reveals the secret of Rust's strength is her subordinate Mordo, who can analyze her opponent's movements in real time and help her react faster. Rakuro decides to capture a new wild robot added to the game a few weeks ago, since not many people have fought with them yet. After working all night updating it, Rakuro confronts Rust with new robot Fiddler Crab. Rust and Mordo are confused why Crab is heavily armored, slow and has a crab claw as its primary weapon when Twinewing is built for speed and long-range attacks. Rakuro activates an invisibility mode, confusing Rust as she can still see the flames from his rockets. She sets off a massive explosion only to lose sight of him in the smoke. Rakuro suddenly appears behind her and with his crab claw severs her right arm.
33	8	"The Lion Catches a Rabbit With Its Full Strength; the Crab Catches a Phoenix With a Pizza Cutter"; Transliteration: "Shishi wa Usagi ni Zenryoku o, Kani wa Fushichō ni Piza Kattā" (Japanese: 獅子は兎に全力を、蟹は不死鳥にピザカッター)	Michita Shiraishi	Takayuki Inagaki	December 1, 2024
Mordo determines Rakuro switched his rocket legs for anti-gravity legs so there wouldn't be any flames for Rust to follow. Rust challenges Rakuro to close combat and cuts off his crab claw but Rakuro charges into her with the circular saw blades hidden on his back, destroying Twinewing. Rust demands another duel to settle their record of Win / Loss / Draw, but Rakuro admits he will be returning to Shangri-La to work on his armors. Rust cannot believe Shangri-La has robot armors so she offers to trade information on the armors in exchange for the secret of the unique scenario for Ctarnidd of the Abyss. Rakuro agrees but must first seek permission from Arthur and Katzo. Seeing the fairness of this, Rust reveals in Shangri-La's fifteenth city Fifticia it is possible to start the quest "Find the Abyss Disciples", which involves a ghost ship and a sea monster, though Rust never bothered to actually start the quest. Rakuro is grateful for the information and offers to duel Rust again once she has built a new robot. Rust sneakily reveals she already has a new robot in her item storage, Ashen Antimony, which Rakuro excitedly agrees to duel straight away. Meanwhile, Emul meets her other brother Ceecrue, who claims a human player has been acknowledged as worthy by Siegwurm the Sky Ruler, the young woman Akitsuakane.
34	9	"Run, Fueled by Impatience"; Transliteration: "Kakero, Shōsō o Nenryō ni" (Japanese: 駆けろ、焦燥を燃料に)	Yoshihiko Iwata	Takebumi Anzai	December 8, 2024
Rakuro struggles to accept that another player has been recognized by a Unique Monster and invited to Rabituza. In particular, he worries Akitsuakane might publicly share the information he has been keeping to himself about the Vorpal Epic. It is also a problem he can't currently focus on since he has to make it to Fifticia by 8am so Rust and Mordo can help him start Ctarnidd's unique scenario. He bribes Emul to stay in Rabituza and contact him as soon as Akitsuakane arrives to meet Vysache. Bilac gives Rakuro the weapons he wanted made from the Goldy scorpion; gauntlets for hand-to-hand fighting called Gilta Brille. Realizing he needs help, Rakuro reaches out to the one player least likely to interrogate him; Psyger-0, aka Rei, who gleefully arranges to meet him in Eleventar on the other side of Ruins of Past Glories. This means Rakuro must defeat the Past Glories area boss to get there in time; the giant boss made of scrap machinery from the Age of Divinity, Overdress Golem. Fortunately, its weakness is very publicly known; by climbing up its back to its head it is possible to defeat it in only 1 minute. Equipping Gilta Brille, Rakuro decides to set a new speed record by defeating Overdress in less than 60 seconds. Meanwhile, Rei arrives in Eleventar a whole hour early and just stands there scaring people.
35	10	"Track It Like a Bloodhound"; Transliteration: "Ryōken no Gotoku Kagitsukete" (Japanese: 猟犬の如く嗅ぎ付けて)	Hide Yamamoto	Takebumi Anzai	December 15, 2024
Animalia meets Arthur secretly. Rakuro defeats Overdress in 59 seconds. Rakuro asks Psyger-0 for help passing through Lightless Barrens. Rei explains Lightless Barrens is a battlefield from the Age of Divinity. There Rakuro sees a giant severed arm and wonders if it and the giant rib cage at Past Glories belonged to the monster from the hologram in the Workshop. He also ponders Setsuna's words on Bahamut and wonders if finding the truth behind the world relies on defeating all 7 unique monsters. Concerning Lycagon's Curse they discuss Eristella, a saintess NPC who can remove curses. Rei asks Rakuro to call her Rei instead of Psyger-0. Rakuro agrees but doesn't realise Psyger Rei is Rei Saiga he goes to school with. Rei shows him a shortcut to the area boss. Rakuro remembers needing a receiver, positioner and transmitter from the Barrens for Vysache. Eventually Rakuro realizes they are lost and Rei is too embarrassed to admit she forgot the route. Animalia and SF-Zoo suddenly appear, revealing that in exchange for money Arthur told them how to trigger Lycagon's unique scenario and receive the invitation to Rabituza. Rakuro questions why they are in the Barrens when Lycagon appears near Secondil. Animalia reminds him SF-Zoo are animal experts and they predicted Lycagon's movements. Rakuro is astounded when Lycagon suddenly appears from the sky.
36	11	"Embrace the Lamplight of Ambition, Part 1"; Transliteration: "Taishi no Tomoshibi o Daite – Sono Ichi" (Japanese: 大志の灯火を抱いて 其の一)	Masahiko Suzuki	Michio Fukuda	December 22, 2024
Animalia is able to use a unique spell to immobilize Lycagon for 60 seconds. According to Arthur, they only need to hit her 100 times for the unique scenario. Rakuro is confused since Emul told him embodying the soul of the Vorpal Rabbit unlocked the unique scenario. The moon suddenly disappears and Rakuro realizes why Lycagon is known as the Nightslayer; she can use the darkness itself as a weapon. The darkness takes shape as a second Lycagon that can teleport between shadows. Rakuro realizes this is how he lost the first time he fought her. Shadow-Lycagon kills Animalia and SF-Zoo, freeing Lycagon. Rakuro is desperate for their long awaited rematch, but can't risk Rei triggering the unique scenario herself then passing the secret to Schwarz Vulf. Plus he still has to reach Fifticia. He considers sabotaging the fight so Lycagon kills them both and the unique scenario remains secret. Rei is concerned she has never seen Rakuro so serious about anything and yet something is holding him back from the fight. Unsure what it is, she nonetheless reminds him what he once told her; enjoy games with all your heart. Rakuro realizes she is right and can't believe he almost let inter-clan politics make him consider dying on purpose. With joy in his heart, he forms a party with Rei and they attack Lycagon together.
37	12	"Embrace the Lamplight of Ambition, Part 2"; Transliteration: "Taishi no Tomoshibi o Daite – Sono Ni" (Japanese: 大志の灯火を抱いて 其の二)	Hiroki Ikeshita	Hiroki Ikeshita	December 29, 2024
Rakuro notices Shadow-Lycagon has simpler attack patterns; appear, attack once, then disappear. Staying in the moonlight, Rakuro is able to dodge Shadow-Lycagon. Lycagon shows she can move through shadows as well and Rakuro is forced to use his Inventoria trick. Rakuro realizes Lycagon can understand speech, meaning she has been listening to everything they say and learning their strategies. Rei reveals she has an ultimate attack, but to use it she must hit Lycagon ten times. Rakuro equips Gilta Brille to keep the Lycagon's focused on him while Rei starts her ten attacks. The moon disappears behind clouds making Shadow-Lycagon faster, forcing Rakuro into Inventoria again where he has an idea. Lycagon's curse stops him equipping armor to his body, but Inventoria contains other equipment he can use. He returns to battle with the helmet Adebane and the combat robot Suzaku. Rei is baffled by this but lands her fourth hit. Suzaku vaporizes the clouds, fully revealing the moon and limiting Shadow-Lycagon's movement. Rei starts to believe she and Rakuro might beat Lycagon by themselves. However, after landing her fifth hit, Lycagon smashes her into a wall. Nearby, Emul races through Past Glories, accompanied by Ceecrue and Akitsuakane, who is certain she has met Rakuro before and looks forward to seeing him again.
38	13	"Embrace the Lamplight of Ambition, Part 3"; Transliteration: "Taishi no Tomoshibi o Daite – Sono San" (Japanese: 大志の灯火を抱いて 其の三)	Daisuke Chiba	Takayuki Inagaki	January 5, 2025
Rakuro tries to distract Lycagon, but she ignores him to attack Rei. She is seemingly killed, only for Akitsuakane to save Rei with a ninja technique. Seeing scars on her face, Rakuro assumes Siegwurm cursed Akitsuakane like Lycagon did to him. He quickly adds her, Ceecrue and Emul to his party, upsetting Rei. Lycagon continues targeting Rei, giving her no opportunity to heal. Akitsuakane references dueling Rakuro in the trash game BERP, causing Rakuro to realize Akitsuakane is actually Dragonfly. Rakuro realizes they aren't dealing damage to Lycagon, as though she is covered by a magic barrier, so he has Emul cast a spell at her designed to damage ghosts. Lycagon actually stops chasing Rei to dodge the spell and Rakuro confirms Lycagon must be a spirit, explaining how she can move through shadows. Lycagon starts targeting Emul, forcing Rakuro to protect her, since NPC's like her die permanently. Suzaku starts to run out of fuel which risks the clouds covering the moon again. Rei lands her tenth attack, allowing her to begin her ultimate attack. Rakuro realizes whilst Rei is preparing she is vulnerable, meaning they have to protect her until she is finished, just as the moon disappears behind another cloud.
39	14	"Embrace the Lamplight of Ambition, Part 4"; Transliteration: "Taishi no Tomoshibi o Daite – Sono Shi" (Japanese: 大志の灯火を抱いて 其の四)	Hiro Ohki	Michio Fukuda	January 12, 2025
With a fire breath attack she learned from Siegwurm, Akitsuakane lights up the area, leaving Shadow-Lycagon no shadows to appear from. Rakuro reveals Gilta Brille also has an ultimate attack, the ability to generate a massive crystal bullet from moonlight. He fires the bullet, causing massive damage to Lycagon, but Rakuro's own health drops to 1. Rei finally strikes Lycagon with her ultimate attack, Armageddon. Somehow, Lycagon survives but to everyone's confusion Lycagon doesn't attack, instead she smiles, dissolves into mist and vanishes. Everyone receives the new title "Shadow-Wolf Revealer", the "Guiding Light" status, and the unique scenario "Light of Courage, Banishing the Dark" yet there is no system announcement for Lycagon's defeat, meaning she is still alive. Rakuro realizes they weren't fighting Lycagon and a Shadow-Lycagon, they were fighting two Shadow-Lycagons. The real Lycagon is out somewhere else watching their battle. Rei is happy anyway as they are still the first to have defeated a Shadow-Lycagon. For a split second, Rei reminds Rakuro of a girl he goes to school with. Rakuro's Lycagon scars start to glow and he hopes the curse will be lifted so he can equip armor. Suddenly, a cartoon likeness of Lycagon's head appears and swallows him.
40	15	"Embrace the Lamplight of Ambition, Part 5"; Transliteration: "Taishi no Tomoshibi o Daite – Sono Go" (Japanese: 大志の灯火を抱いて 其の五)	Yoshitaka Nagaoka	Takebumi Anzai	January 19, 2025
Cartoon-Lycagon spits him out after altering his curse. The real Lycagon will now hunt him herself. The curse can no longer be removed by a Saint. He can now equip armor, but the armor will slowly degrade, much to his annoyance. Rakuro finds Guiding Light will point them towards Lycagon if they come within a certain distance of her. Everyone accepts the Light of Courage scenario. Rakuro remembers he is supposed to be travelling to Fifticia and quickly defeats Lightless Barren's area boss, the Usurper Dragon. In Fifticia, Rakuro encounters Archanuum the Awakening Sage, who offers all players over level 99 the Arcanum, a skill buff that improves some stats but decreases others based on combat style. Rakuro is granted the Arcanum of The Fool; his skills in combat will recharge twice as fast so he can use them more often, but in exchange he is made more vulnerable to certain attacks and healing potions become less effective. Rei is surprised Rakuro actually has Level 99 Extend, which is only granted to players who defeated a monster of at least level 100 and is a vital step towards removing his level limit and allowing his abilities to level up infinitely. Elsewhere, Ctarnidd waits patiently at the bottom of the ocean.
41	16	"What Do You Play Games For? Their Answers"; Transliteration: "Anata wa Nan no Tame ni Gēmu o Shimasu ka?: Karera no Kaitō" (Japanese: 貴方はなんのためにゲームをしますか？：彼らの回答)	Takeya Nosaka	Takebumi Anzai	January 26, 2025
In the past, three days after Wethermon's defeat, Katzo levels up by killing the Lifestide Lake Serpent repeatedly. It is revealed Katzo is a professional gamer who started playing Shangri-La as practice for the new game Galaxia Heroes, which uses the same game engine. He encounters a Destrobster and remembers Rakuro once defeated a Destrobster with Emul's help, so he decides to defeat it solo and surpass Rakuro. At the same time, Arthur is dealing with her own penalties following the Wethermon battle. Forbidden from making transactions with money, she visits Schwartz Vulf and steals multiple weapons by lying to the boy on the desk. It is revealed Arthur started playing Shangri-La specifically to help Setsuna and Wethermon and almost quit playing after Wethermon's defeat. However, Setsuna's brooch keeps urging her to travel west, so Arthur is convinced Bahamut is there. In the present at Utopia Games, Sakai is forced to tell Tsukuyo and Ritsu that Shadow-Lycagon was defeated by the same player who defeated Wethermon. Surprisingly, Tsukuyo does not mind since it doesn't affect Shangri-La's larger story, though Ritsu is angry to find Tsukuyo had actually made Lycagon even smarter just before the fight without telling her, yet she was defeated anyway. This leads to a melee between Tsukuyo and Ritsu in which Sakai barely survives.
42	17	"A Straight Flush Mixed With Jokers"; Transliteration: "Jōkā Majiri no Sutorēto Furasshu" (Japanese: ジョーカー混じりのストレートフラッシュ)	Mitsutoshi Satō	Mitsutoshi Satō	February 2, 2025
Katzo has an important championship approaching at the Global Game Competition but loses two teammates, so he asks Rakuro and Arthur for assistance. Rei decides not to tell her sister about beating Shadow-Lycagon. Rei panics after realizing Akitsuakane can also visit Rabituza, meaning she can spend time with Rakuro without her. Rakuro finds he can wear armor for three minutes before it disintegrates and finds Rust and Mold in a bar fighting with thug NPCs and fills them in on everything, ending with getting the robot armors of Inventoria. Rust reveals that last time she won a bar fight she met NPC pirate captain Stude, who offered her the Ctarnidd quest. Having recreated the bar fight, Stude appears again but turns out to be an obnoxious young brat. Fortunately, as an NPC he is terrified by Rakuro's scars and invites him to the quest straight away to defeat the ghost ship Crying Innsman that murdered his father by sacrificing him to the Master of the Abyss. They aboard Stude's pirate ship called the Scarlet Whale. NPC delivery men suddenly drop off barrels for Rakuro containing vital supplies. After opening them up, Rakuro finds Rei, Akitsuakane and Ceecrue, who cannot remember why they were in barrels or what they are doing there.
43	18	"The Crimson Whale Meets the Monster Fish"; Transliteration: "Aka Kujira, Sakana Kai to Sōtai-su" (Japanese: 赤鯨、魚怪と相対す)	Kazunobu Shimizu	Takebumi Anzai	February 9, 2025
Akitsuakane reveals they are still in Rakuro's party, so when he accepted Stude's invitation they all received the invitation, were kidnapped by the NPC pirates and brought to the ship. As they set sail they learn the Crying Innsman is crewed by fish-men. Rei is relieved Rust doesn't seem to be romantically interested in Rakuro. Storm clouds appear from nowhere and the Crying Innsman is summoned from the ocean floor by a bolt of lightning. The Innsman attempts to ram them from the side to sink them, but Stude steers them into a head on collision, damaging the front of the ship but avoiding sinking. While the others battle the fish-men, Rakuro boards the Innsman with Rust and Mold to confront the captain, the Frijjshark Zombie. Stude overcomes his fear and decides to fight as well to avenge his father. Rei struggles as she is still suffering the after-effects of casting her Armageddon spell, which dropped her combat and armor levels by 50%. Rakuro throws Emul to Mold in the crows' nest to provide magical support from above, allowing him to go all out on Frijjshark.
44	19	"Revive, Broken City, Your Peace At an End"; Transliteration: "Seihitsu ga Owaru, Hai-to yo Nigiyaka Nare" (Japanese: 静謐が終わる、廃都よ賑やかなれ)	Yoshihiko Iwata	Takahiro Tanaka	February 16, 2025
Frijjshark heads right for Stude, causing Rakuro to realize the quest isn't to kill the boss, but an escort mission to keep Stude alive. Rei saves Stude, having overcome her level drop by equipping different armor. Akitsuakane jumps onto the Innsman and the game unexpectedly lags. Ctarnidd suddenly drags the Innsman to the bottom of the ocean, starting the unique scenario "The Abyss Lies Above in a World Turning Upside-Down". Rakuro awakens alone in a cave containing the Abyssal City Ruluiath where Frijjshark and the fish-men have all turned into normal fish, which Rakuro stores in Inventoria. A wounded shark-man realizes people have arrived. Rakuro suspects the lag occurred from the quest starting when Stude and all the players were on the Innsman. A timer appears and begins counting down from 168 hours, 7 days exactly, to defeat Ctarnidd. Rakuro spots the shark-man and helps him escape to a safe zone to set up a respawn point. Mermaids attack and Rakuro is injured. He attempts to heal but forgets that the Fools Arcanum negates some healing items. Araba scares the mermaids away and explains Ctarnidd is the Master of Inversion and Ruluiath is a city that exists upside down, so what Rakuro thought was the roof of a cave is actually the ocean floor, and the floor he is walking on is the surface of the ocean with the sky below it.
45	20	"Time to Fillet a Dragon Fish"; Transliteration: "Iza Ryū Sakana San-mai Oroshi" (Japanese: いざ龍魚三枚おろし)	Hide Yamamoto	Takayuki Inagaki	February 23, 2025
Araba notes Ctarnidd doesn't kill people, but kidnaps them to watch their struggles for its own amusement. Rakuro notices towers containing a Sealing General that nullifies abilities. The only one Araba knows is Clionaire who can seal spells. Araba also mentions only one person has escaped, his grandfather, who stabbed Ctarnidd's left eye and was teleported to freedom. Rakuro shouts as loudly as he can, attracting Emul and Stude, who are being chased by a dragon-fish. They manage to escape with help from Ceecrue and Rust while Rakuro fights the dragon-fish. Akitsuakane encounters Mold while elsewhere Rei logs out. Rakuro kills the dragon-fish and is irritated when Ctarnidd's inversion repairs the damaged buildings, certain Ctarnidd is mocking him. At Rust's insistence, Rakuro shows her a robot named Suzaku, though its power is still depleted. Rakuro is disappointed Rei hasn't found them yet. With only 164 hours remaining, Rakuro quickly schedules everybody's available time and accounts for their real lives, sleeping, and the two days he will be helping out Katzo. While he is gone, he leaves Araba in charge of protecting Emul, Ceecrue and Stude. Meanwhile, an American gamer arrives in Japan for the Global Game Competition and issues a challenge to Katzo.
46	21	"Venturing Wolves Then From the Seas to the Skyscrapers"; Transliteration: "Soshite Tabi Ōkami wa Umi kara Matenrō e" (Japanese: そして旅狼は海から摩天楼へ)	Yūma Imura & Asahi Yoshimura	Takebumi Anzai	March 2, 2025
Rakuro meets Katzo and Arthur in person for the first time; Kei Uomi and Towa Amane, respectively a celebrity gamer and a supermodel. Deciding to make an impression, Rakuro meets them wearing a limited edition mask from another famous trash game. Katzo introduces his other teammate Megumi. Katzo explains their opponents will be Star Rain, the American champions whose leader, Sylvia Goldberg, hasn't lost a single fight. Megumi doubts Rakuro or Arthur will be of use against Sylvia, but Katzo reveals they are actually his secret weapon. The competition is to be held in the unreleased Galaxia Heroes, which uses the same game engine as Shangri-La Frontier, giving himself, Rakuro and Arthur a huge skill advantage over Star Rain who has never played Shangri-La Frontier. They take time to practice in Galaxia Heroes where the avatars are all comic book characters. Megumi challenges Rakuro to determine his skill level. Rakuro finds he must change his play style between villain and hero characters, since acting villainous makes villain characters stronger, and acting heroically makes hero characters stronger. Rakuro picks the hero Ranzo who dual wields katanas and increases his strength by rescuing NPCs. Megumi picks the villainess Yggdrya who can control plants and increases her power by victimizing NPCs, intending to show Katzo she is superior to amateurs like Rakuro and Arthur.
47	22	"The Light Blazes Brightly, But for Just an Instant"; Transliteration: "Tada Isshun nite Kidoru wa Shakkō no Genkai" (Japanese: ただ一瞬にて気取るは灼光の限界)	Hiro Ohki	Hiro Ohki	March 9, 2025
Rakuro continues rescuing NPCs to fill his hero bar, revealing victory can also be obtained by exchanging a full hero or villain bar for a Chaos Cube. Rakuro encounters Megumi who sacrifices her villain bar to destroy the ground under his feet, but Rakuro predicts the attack and sacrifices his hero bar for an attack that drops Megumi's health by 50%. She attempts to flee to recharge her villain bar, but Rakuro follows and cuts her head off. Rakuro realizes Megumi fights like Arthur and Katzo, whereas Megumi realizes Rakuro fights like Sylvia. Katzo ponders changing his own tactics to beat Sylvia. Megumi is astounded when Arthur defeats Rakuro by causing a mob of frightened NPCs to swarm him asking for help, limiting his movements so she could crush the whole group with him in it. Rakuro and Arthur childishly assume Megumi has a crush on Katzo. Katzo asks for a duel but insists Rakuro use the character Metius, a hero that moves at super speeds but isn't very strong. Katzo chooses Armed Lava, another hero who can produce flaming projectiles and has arm amour that burns on contact. Despite being at a disadvantage, Rakuro wins the duel with superior agility. Katzo is disappointed Armed Lava can't defeat Metius, revealing that at a previous GGC match he used Armed Lava whilst Sylvia used Metius.
48	23	"Malice at 100 Meters Per Second"; Transliteration: "Byōsoku Hyaku Mētoru no Satsui" (Japanese: 秒速百メートルの殺意)	Hide Yamamoto & Akiba Tsang	Shinji Nagata	March 16, 2025
Katzo shows the recording of his loss to Sylvia at a previous GGC. Rakuro agrees she fights the same way he does, only with greater reaction times. As Katzo insists on dueling Sylvia, Rakuro decides to focus on defeating her teammates. He goes shopping for energy drinks and encounters a foreign girl in a mask he suspects is a gamer from how she looks at a poster of Shangri-La. The girl returns to her hotel where she is revealed to be Silvia. Having grown bored of practicing Galaxia Heroes, she impulsively decides to try Shangri-La Frontier for the first time. In his room, Rakuro is likewise bored and logs into Shangri-La where it is night time and all the fish-men have reverted back into normal fish. Araba warns him a King roams the city at night. Rakuro quickly spots King, a giant shark named Atlanticus that preys on dragon-fish using fire and electricity attacks. Rakuro provokes Atlanticus into chasing him towards a Sealing General tower to see if it is possible to destroy them. At one point, he barely dodges an attack and realizes the professional gaming chairs provided by the GGC have much faster reaction times than the helmets used by normal gamers. Atlanticus attacks again, destroying a huge area of Ruluiath with Rakuro seemingly caught in the blast.
49	24	"Great King of the Deep, I Humbly Seek to Crush You"; Transliteration: "Fukaki Umi no ō yo, Buchi no Meshi Tatematsuru" (Japanese: 深き海の王よ、ぶちのめし奉る)	Michita Shiraishi	Yoshimasa Hiraike	March 23, 2025
Rakuro escapes into Inventoria at the last second, but when he gets out he finds the city destroyed, with only the Sealing Tower remaining undamaged. Atlanticus returns and almost eats him, but he is saved by Araba who swims him up high over the city. Rakuro is surprised Araba can swim through the air. Araba reveals he figured out how Ruluiath works; as a human Rakuro perceives Ruluiath as being filled with air, but as a fish-based species Araba can choose to perceive it as water-filled in order to swim. Rakuro has an epiphany of his own; if Ruluiath works on Inversion then it makes no sense for the Towers to be indestructible, but to reflect all attacks away from itself. He then discovers he can use this in order to defeat Atlanticus. Working together, he and Araba provoke Atlanticus into shooting an electricity laser at Rakuro as he stands on the Tower. Rakuro uses Inventoria again so the laser misses him, strikes the tower and is reflected back onto Atlanticus, injuring it with its own attack. As it is still alive, Rakuro kills it with Gilta Brille, just narrowly missing its final fiery explosion as it dies. Collecting the loot, Rakuro suddenly realizes he has no idea how long he has been playing, meaning he has gotten no sleep before the first GGC match.
50	25	"The Anonymous (Asinine) A-Team and a Crisis"; Transliteration: "Tokumei (Baka) Yarō A-Chīmu, Soshite Fūun Kyū" (Japanese: 匿名(馬鹿)野郎Aチーム、そして風雲急)	Daisuke Chiba & Takeya Nosaka	Takebumi Anzai	March 30, 2025
Rakuro learns that in order to compete he must post his name on the competition website. Arthur chooses to register under an alias, as does Rakuro, so they respectively register as No Face and No Name. Arthur also decides she and Rakuro will cosplay for extra fun. Katzo receives news from his manager that one of his sponsors has demanded he take part in the War Hounds Championship on the same day. With the match schedules, Katzo will miss the GGC match by 2 hours. Rakuro decides they will simply make it so that Katzo goes last for the GGC matches, ensuring that their own matches last as long as possible. As the matches are also best of three, they can stretch the time limit even further by allowing Sylvia and her teammates to win one match each. All Katzo then has to do is win the War Hounds match within 3 hours and he should be able to make it to his GGC match as well. Unfortunately, when Sylvia's team post their names it turns out Sylvia is going third, not fourth, so in order to fight her Katzo has to win War Hounds in 2 hours instead of 3. The competition begins and the audience are baffled as Rakuro cosplays as Jack, a pumpkin headed mercenary, and Arthur as Nameless, a female knight. Sylvia immediately notices Katzo's absence, but Arthur explains that he's in the bathroom and will arrive for their match later. Meanwhile, a counter shows that Rakuro only has 95 hours remaining to defeat Ctarnidd.

== Recap special ==
No.	Title	Original release date
14.5	"Get Yourselves Caught up With This Light-Speed Recap!"; Transliteration: "Tokubetsu Bōnasu Episōdo" (Japanese: 特別ボーナスエピソード)	January 14, 2024
A recap special narrated by Rakuro, Katzo, Arthur and Emul

== Home media release ==
=== Japanese ===
Aniplex (Japan – Region 2/A)
Vol.	Episodes	Cover character(s)	Release date
Season 1
1	1–13	Rakuro Hizutome / Sunraku	March 27, 2024
2	14–25	Towa Amane / Arthur Pencilgon	June 26, 2024
Season 2
3	26–37	Rakuro Hizutome / Sunraku	March 26, 2025
4	38–50	Rakuro Hizutome / Sunraku & Emul	June 25, 2025
