= Phantasy Star 0 =

2008 video game

- Developer: Sega
- Publisher: Sega
- Director: Masayuki Kawabata
- Producer: Satoshi Sakai
- Designer: Masayuki Kawabata
- Programmer: Kenichi Tanase
- Artists: Akikazu Mizuno; Toshiyuki Kubooka
- Writers: Toru Shiwasu; Teru Arai
- Composers: Hideaki Kobayashi; Tadashi Kinukawa; Masaru Setsumaru; Fumie Kumatani
- Series: Phantasy Star
- Platform: Nintendo DS
- Release: JP: December 25, 2008; NA: November 10, 2009; AU: February 11, 2010; EU: April 12, 2010
- Genres: Hack and slash, role-playing video game
- Modes: Single-player, multiplayer

Phantasy Star 0, (Note: Japanese: ファンタジースターZERO, Hepburn: Fantashī Sutā Jiarō) also known in Australia and Europe as Phantasy Star: ZERO and sometimes in North America as Phantasy Star Ø, is a Nintendo DS game in the Phantasy Star series, developed by Sonic Team and published by Sega. The game was released in Japan on December 25, 2008; in North America on November 10, 2009; and in Europe on February 12, 2010. The game expands on the gameplay mechanics of Phantasy Star Online, partly by borrowing some elements from fellow online Phantasy Star title Phantasy Star Universe, such as a fully realized story mode for offline play.

== Gameplay ==
Phantasy Star Zero continues the character creation mechanics from Phantasy Star Online. The player first chooses a race, each with their own strengths: versatile Humans; powerful, hulking androids called CASTs; or nimble but fragile genetically engineered Newmans. The choice affects the character's perspective on the story and what order in which the first three zones are tackled, but all stories end identically. The player then chooses the character's gender and archetype. Males tend to favor physical strength and durability; females tend to favor accuracy, evasion and techniques, Phantasy Star's equivalent to magic. Archetypes determine which weapons and techniques a character can use.

=== Online and offline modes ===
Similar to Phantasy Star Online, players can shop, bank, accept quests, and access combat areas from a city-like hub world. In the offline Story Mode, the player gains AI allies and progresses a narrative, which includes multiple cut scenes and dialogue sequences. Once completed, the player can access higher difficulty levels to earn increasingly powerful gear and further grow their characters. The game also contains three online modes: Free Play, in which the player is randomly paired up with a party of one to three users; Play With Friends, where the player can invite friends into a private room (and vice versa); and Play Alone, where the player can play online alone to complete online-only missions and be notified of friends' connection status.

=== Communication ===
Featured in the game is "Visual Chat", a take on PictoChat where players communicate by drawing and writing on the DS touch screen. According to the February 2009 issue of Nintendo Power (Vol. 238, page 38), "Up to 20 messages may be saved to shortcuts so they're accessible at any time via a quick tap of the touch screen". Players can also write freely to each other throughout a game session without the use of pre-composed messages. However, communication among unfamiliar users is limited to preset chat. Even considering its limitations, the preset phrases offer an unprecedented amount of communication between anonymous users from anywhere in the world over Nintendo Wi-Fi Connection. Players will receive the preset phrase in their own languages as well as the speakers'.

=== Gear and character optimization ===
The game contains over 350 weapons, debuting two new weapon classes, shields and gunblades. Shields are blunt weapons that can be used to block enemy attacks, and gunblades are one-handed swords that also carry a gun barrel, allowing for long range and short range interchangeability by holding the Left Trigger button. Most equipment can be upgraded through various means. Items called grinders can further improve a weapon or armor's effectiveness. In addition, weapons can be upgraded with elements, allowing them special on-hit effects or additional damage, and "Photon Fortification," which increases a weapon's effectiveness against a hostile classification of the player's choosing. Characters can be further specialized by using materials, items that permanently increase a base stat.

== Development ==
The decision to develop Phantasy Star 0 for the Nintendo DS was made to expand the appeal of the series to younger gamers. The word Zero was affixed to the title to represent "a new start for the series" and separate itself from the main series games in favor of the GameCube games. Artist Toshiyuki Kubooka, made famous by his work on the Lunar series and Giant Robo anime, designed the game's characters with an "uplifting" aesthetic. The game was exhibited at Tokyo Game Show (TGS) 2008 as part of Sega's lineup of new DS games.

== DSiWare version ==
A smaller version of the game, Phantasy Star 0 Mini, was released for the Nintendo DSiWare service on March 25, 2009. Sega also mentioned the possibility of a new Nintendo DSi-exclusive downloadable stage for the game, possibly one from the original Phantasy Star Online. A poll for players to pick their favorite classic stage would be held on Sega of Japan's website at a later date.

== Reception ==
Reception

Aggregate score
Aggregator	Score
Metacritic	71/100

Review scores
Publication	Score
Famitsu	33/40
GamesMaster	81%
GameSpot	6.5/10
GameZone	7.8/10
NGamer	80%
Nintendo Life	7/10
Nintendo Power	8/10
Official Nintendo Magazine	71%
VideoGamer.com	6/10
The A.V. Club	D+

The game received "average" reviews according to the review aggregation website Metacritic.

Famitsu gave it a score of two eights, one nine, and one eight for a total of 33 out of 40; the authors praised the game's controls, game play, and online mode, noting, "it really feels like an online game in the palm of your hand." The publication criticized the game's "softness of the sound." Nintendo Power gave good remarks towards the game, but heavily criticized the menu setup and the loss to change weapons during gameplay. Phantasy Star 0 sold approximately 84,055 copies during its debut week in Japan.
