= Toshiyuki Kubooka =

Japanese illustrator and animator (born 1963)

Toshiyuki Kubooka (窪岡 俊之, Kubooka Toshiyuki; born 19 December 1963) is a Japanese animator, character designer, and director. He is particularly known for his work on the Giant Robo OVA series, as well as, his work on the Lunar series and The Idolmaster. He was born in Hokkaido.

== Notable works ==
=== Anime ===
- Batman: Gotham Knight (Segment: Working Through Pain; Animation director)
- Gunbuster (animation director)
- Nadia: The Secret of Blue Water (animation director)
- Giant Robo (character designer, animation director)
- Giant Robo Ginrei Special (character designer, animation director)
- Yamato 2520 (character designer)
- Gankutsuou (opening animator)
- Beck (storyboard)
- Time Jam: Valerian & Laureline (animation director)
- Berserk: The Golden Age Arc (director)
- Harukana Receive (director)
- Wandering Witch: The Journey of Elaina (director)
- Handyman Saitou in Another World (director)
- Shangri-La Frontier (director)

=== Games ===
- Lunar: The Silver Star (character designer, animation director)
- Lunar: Eternal Blue (character designer, animation director)
- Lunar: Walking School (character designer)
- Lunar: Silver Star Story (character designer, animation director)
- Albert Odyssey: Legend of Eldean (character designer)
- Magic School Lunar! (character designer, animation director)
- Lunar 2: Eternal Blue (character designer, animation director)
- Lunar Legend (character designer)
- Seishun Quiz: Colorful Highschool (character designer)
- The iDOLM@STER (character designer)
- Lunar: Dragon Song (character designer)
- Phantasy Star 0 (character designer)
