= Studio Alex =

Japanese video game company

Studio Alex, Ltd.
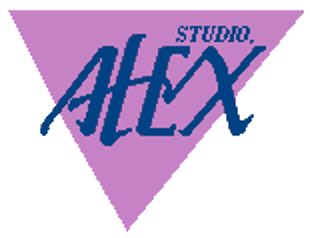
- Native name: 有限会社スタジオアレックス
- Romanized name: Sutajioarekkusu
- Founder: Kazunari Tomi
- Defunct: 2003
- Products: Video games

Studio Alex, Ltd. (Japanese: 有限会社スタジオアレックス, romanized: Yūgengaisha Sutajioarekkusu) was a Japanese video game development firm. It was founded by programmer Kazunari Tomi, a former employee of Nihon Falcom whose credits include Sorcerian, Star Trader, and Dinosaur. After leaving Nihon Falcom, he founded Studio Alex, which functioned primarily as a consultant company.

Studio Alex co-developed the initial three titles of the Lunar series with Game Arts, released in Japan between 1992 and 1996. The company would later file a lawsuit against Game Arts over secondary creator copyrights to Lunar: The Silver Star, claiming that its remake for the Sega Saturn, Lunar: Silver Star Story, was produced without their permission and requested royalties. Game Arts then counter-sued Studio Alex for damages and development issues related to the Saturn version of Mahō Gakuen Lunar!, as well as a theatrical animation meant to coincide with its release. In March 2003, the court ruled in favor of Game Arts, and Studio Alex bankrupted thereafter.

== Works ==
Title	Release date	Platform	Notes
Lunar: The Silver Star	June 26, 1992	Sega CD	Co-developed with Game Arts
Götzendiener	November 25, 1994	TurboGrafx-CD	Co-developed with Gainax
Lunar: Eternal Blue	December 22, 1994	Sega CD	Co-developed with Game Arts
Lunar: Sanposuru Gakuen	January 26, 1996	Game Gear	Co-developed with Ehrgeiz
Rema the Truth	September 17, 1996	Windows	Co-developed with Ehrgeiz
Cellophanes	December 11, 1997	PlayStation	Programming
Princess Maker: Go! Go! Princess	January 21, 1999	PlayStation	Programming
The Adventure of Little Ralph	June 3, 1999	PlayStation	Field graphics
