= Lunar: The Silver Star =

1992 video game

- North American cover art
- Developer: Game Arts (Note: Direction by Studio Alex)
- Publishers: JP: Game Arts; NA: Working Designs
- Artist: Toshiyuki Kubooka
- Writer: Kei Shigema
- Composers: Noriyuki Iwadare; Hiroshi Fujioka; Isao Mizoguchi
- Series: Lunar
- Platform: Sega CD
- Release: JP: June 26, 1992; NA: December 1993
- Genre: Role-playing
- Mode: Single-player

Lunar: The Silver Star (Note: Japanese: LUNAR(ルナ) ザ・シルバースター, Hepburn: Runa: Za Shirubā Sutā) is a role-playing video game developed by Game Arts in association with Studio Alex for the Sega/Mega-CD, originally published by Game Arts and released in Japan in 1992. After a successful release, the game was translated and localized by Working Designs for release in North America the following year.

Designed as a "different kind of RPG", Lunar: The Silver Star made use of the up-and-coming CD-ROM format by featuring high quality audio, full motion video, and voice acting to narrate a fantasy story set in a magical world. The game centers on the exploits of Alex, a young boy from a small town who dreams of one day becoming a great hero like his idol, Dragonmaster Dyne. When a childish adventure later turns to discovering an ancient dragon, Alex and his friends must journey across the world to gather the necessary power to become the next Dragonmaster, and save the world in the process.

Lunar: The Silver Star was critically and commercially successful, becoming the number one selling Mega-CD title in Japan and the second highest-selling Mega-CD title. As the first game in the Lunar series, it set the standard for other follow-up titles including the direct sequel Lunar: Eternal Blue in 1994. Since the game's original release, three enhanced remakes have been produced for various systems: Lunar: Silver Star Story Complete in 1996, Lunar Legend in 2002, and Lunar: Silver Star Harmony in 2009.

== Gameplay ==
Lunar: The Silver Star is a traditional, top-down role-playing video game featuring two-dimensional characters and environments. The player must navigate towns, fields, and harsh environments to complete story-based objectives that move the plot forward, as well as interact with non-player characters to expand the script and gain various rewards. Making use of the Sega CD's disc hardware capabilities, short video and audio interludes accompany the game's narrative, including full or quarter-screen animated images and CD-DA sound files. Players record their progress by saving to either the Sega CD's internal RAM, or a separately purchased RAM cartridge that fit into the accompanying Mega Drive/Genesis.

While traveling in the game's world, players randomly encounter enemy monsters that must be defeated or avoided to progress. Battle sequences utilize a turn-based approach, with the player and enemies acting in accordance with their "speed" rating. The player issues commands to each controlled character in their party, which are then carried out in sequence until the battle ends. While on the battlefield, players may choose to move their characters to attack the enemy, retreat into a corner, stand their ground, or flee the battle entirely, with characters only able to strike enemies if they are close enough to their target or use a ranged attack. Nall, a supporting character not directly involved in combat, is present throughout the game to analyze enemies before battles begin, gauging their relative strength to the player's group. Players may find weapons, equipment, and assorted items during gameplay that increase the effectiveness of characters in battle, such as causing more damage to opponents and increasing their stamina. Winning battles grant experience points that go towards making characters stronger and able to battle progressively more difficult enemies. Upon defeat, a player may choose to load a previous save file, or restart their game at an automatically saved checkpoint.

== Plot ==
=== Setting ===
The game takes place in the fantasy land of Lunar, a small habitable world orbiting the massive, barren blue planet (known as the Blue Star), forming a loose parallel between the game's world and the Earth and its moon. Centuries before the start of the game, the Blue Star was rendered unlivable by years of war. The powerful and benevolent goddess Althena relocated humanity to the Silver Star, the world of Lunar, and entrusted four dragons to safeguard the elements of the new world. From this point on, those who would use the power of the dragons to serve the goddess and protect the world were known as "Dragonmasters", and no such Dragonmaster was more revered than Dyne, a legendary hero who defended the goddess and succumbed to an unknown fate. The stories surrounding Dyne's exploits would form the life model for a young boy named Alex, the game's protagonist and central character, who also aspires to become a Dragonmaster himself. Many of the locations of Lunar: The Silver Star were given a deliberate "northern" feel to present an environment that was cooler than the settings of most role-playing games, if only to allow the characters to wear more clothing. Many towns and locations were based on areas of Russia and Medieval Europe.

=== Characters ===
The characters of Lunar: The Silver Star were designed by anime and manga artist Toshiyuki Kubooka. The main characters include Alex and his companions, each of which have their own reasons for joining his quest:

- Alex - a 15-year-old boy from a small town with dreams of becoming an adventurer. Alex is a mostly silent protagonist, typical of a Japanese RPG.
- Nall - a small, winged creature resembling a white cat who has been with him since birth.
- Luna - Alex's childhood friend and love interest who has the unique ability to heal with music.
- Ramus - son of the town mayor who dreams of one day opening his own shop, and begins Alex's adventuring career by having him fetch a priceless diamond from a dragon's cave.
- Nash - a junior premier of the floating city of Vane, often prone to rash decisions and occasionally despair.
- Mia - another junior premier of Vane, though much more reserved than Nash.
- Kyle - a headstrong and womanizing bandit.
- Jessica - a tomboyish daughter of a famous hero who is training to be a priestess.

Major supporting characters include the three surviving members of the Four Heroes, a legendary band of adventurers who aided Dragonmaster Dyne in protecting the Goddess Althena years before the game's story, whose ranks include:

- "Deadly" Mel D'Alkirk, father of Jessica and mayor of the bustling city of Meribia. In the original Japanese version, it is said that he governs Meribia, although Working Designs' translation adds that he founded the city.
- Lemia Ausa, mother of Mia and head of Vane.
- Ghaleon, powerful sorcerer and teacher of Nash who becomes the primary antagonist after assuming his alter ego, the Magic Emperor.

The party is aided by:

- Laike, a powerful swordsman and expert adventurer who acts as a mentor to Alex and is later revealed to be Dragonmaster Dyne after losing his powers.
- Tempest and Fresca, plains-dwelling fighters who have their own reasons for helping Alex and his group.

Many of the character's original Japanese names were altered for the game's North American release, such as Killy to Kyle, Faidy to Quark, Temzin to Tempest, and Pilya to Fresca; Mel's original epithet, "Hell" Mel, was changed to "Deadly" for censorship reasons. A witch named Xenobia serves as a secondary antagonist and Ghaleon's right hand servant.

=== Story ===
Much of the plot of Lunar: The Silver Star was written by novelist Kei Shigema, and involves a world of high fantasy and with emphasis on folklore and legend. The game begins in the small mountain town of Burg, where a young Alex frequently visits the monument to the fallen hero Dyne, his idol. At the behest of Ramus, eager son of the town mayor, Ramus and Alex embark on their first real adventure, with Alex's adopted sister Luna and their talking flying pet Nall, to the mysterious Dragon's Cave in search of a valuable diamond. Making their way through the cavern, the group meets Quark, an aged dragon who senses great potential in Alex, and urges him to complete the trials of other dragons to become the next Dragonmaster, champion of the Goddess Althena, and protector of the world. Quark shows an interest in Luna as well, remarking that she has a familiar aura about her. Obtaining the diamond from Quark, Ramus finds he cannot sell it in Burg, and must travel to the major trade city of Meribia to claim his fortune. The group then makes their way to Saith, a small port town to the south, where Luna leaves the group to stay with Alex's family.

An animated cutscene with Quark the White Dragon

Across the ocean, Alex, Nall, and Ramus enter Meribia, where they meet one of the legendary Four Heroes, Mel. Attempting to sell his diamond, Ramus is swindled by a jewel dealer who flees into the sewers. After reclaiming it, Ramus slyly bargains the owner's life for his entire shop, and leaves the group to pursue his dream of becoming rich. Alex and Nash depart for the city of Vane where they meet Mia, daughter of the city's ruler and Nash's love interest, who informs them of Ghaleon, head of the guild and former great hero who fought with Dyne years ago. Seemingly intrigued by Alex's quest, Ghaleon sends Alex on a mission to investigate the appearance of a false Dragonmaster in a faraway town. Upon arrival, Alex meets Jessica, daughter of Mel and aspiring priestess, who helps him locate the imposter before returning to Vane. Pleased with his success, Ghaleon accompanies Alex back to his hometown to meet Quark and discuss Alex's future, when he suddenly attacks, revealing himself as the Magic Emperor and seemingly kills Quark in a fit of rage. Citing the loss of his friend Dyne, who died protecting the Goddess, Ghaleon swears revenge on both she and her dragons and departs after kidnapping Luna. Distraught, Alex and Nall return to Meribia to find it under attack by a band of monsters under Ghaleon's command. Regrouping with Jessica, the group fights back a wave of invaders before witnessing Mel turn to stone from a dark spell of Xenobia, Ghaleon's top general. Wanting revenge, Jessica accompanies Alex to Vane, also under siege, and assists Nash and Mia with a similar invasion before they too join the group.

Realizing they must make Alex a Dragonmaster to confront Ghaleon and save Luna, the team heads to the border town of Nanza to enlist Kyle, Jessica's boyfriend, in letting them cross into foreign land. After traveling to a town of inventors, the group obtains a floating device that leads them to the lair of the Red Dragon, who is seemingly destroyed by Ghaleon just before they arrive. The dragon's spirit grants Alex her power before disappearing, and the group departs for the Blue Dragon's cave behind a musical town. Again, the dragon is defeated before their arrival, and the team must travel to the distant and barren Frontier to seek the final trial. The party finds the black dragon, which attacks the team in a mad rage induced by Ghaleon but is defeated. With the final dragon's blessing, Alex and his companions approach the construction site of Ghaleon's mobile mechanical castle, the Grindery, but are unable to stop its advance before it destroys Vane using the power of Luna, who is revealed to be the human form of the Goddess Althena and who is under the Magic Emperor's control. After obtaining Althena's Sword and learning the truth about Luna, the party attacks the Grindery and defeats both Xenobia and the Magic Emperor. Knowing what he must do to bring Luna back, Alex climbs the path to Luna, who, as Althena, continuously blasts him with lightning; he plays his harp as he advances, and hearing their song allows Luna's personality to return. She awakens in Alex's arms, surrounded by their friends.

== Development ==
Lunar: The Silver Star was developed by Game Arts in an attempt to create a role-playing game that would primarily focus on both animation and storytelling. The team turned to scenario writer and novelist Kei Shigema to craft a story that would break away from "hum-drum 'model'" games that "had stories, but had no story-telling". Using the Sega CD's video playback capabilities, animator and artist Toshiyuki Kubooka oversaw the planning of several video sequences that would be coupled with voice-overs to better tell the story of the Lunar world. Settling on an overall fantasy approach as opposed to the popular role-playing alternative of science fiction, the team wanted to explore the mythos and history of a fictional world that would gradually reveal itself to the player over time. Having mostly developed side-scrollers and scrolling shooters for the Mega Drive and PC Engine, Game Arts formed its subsidiary company, Studio Alex, named for the main character of this title, to oversee most of the game's development. Due to time constraints, nearly one-third of the Lunar project was scrapped by the game's release.

Lunar's English version was handled by Working Designs, a small California-based publisher who had previously localized smaller games for the TurboGrafx-16 and TurboDuo. Their biggest project yet, the team, headed by company vice president and chief writer Victor Ireland, took to the project seriously, often collaborating with the original Japanese team themselves. New gameplay elements were often added at Ireland's request, including new sequences such as playing Alex's harp to awaken Luna near the end of the game. Working Designs also put extra effort into the game's packaging, giving the instruction booklet embossed lettering, and having seven separate stamps, each with different artwork, produced for the front of the game discs to increase collection value.

The English script was nearly four megabytes in size, yet Working Designs completed the translation in only eight weeks after a marathon programming session. During translation, the developers did find time to inject some of their own humor in to the game's text, dropping in sentences such as "Have you ever tried swimming in lemon jello?", and numerous light-hearted pop culture references not seen in the original version, including allusions to American commercials, celebrities, colloquialisms, products, and role-playing game clichés.

== Audio ==
The music for Lunar: The Silver Star was composed by Noriyuki Iwadare, Hiroshi Fujioka, Isao Mizoguchi, and Yoshiaki Kubodera, who utilized the Sega CD's sound capabilities to create CD-quality CD-DA. The game features the opening theme "Lunar", performed by Mayumi Sudou in the original Japanese version. The English version, also titled "Lunar", is a slightly arranged piece performed by vocalist Shiya Almeda which features new lyrics by Victor Ireland, who intended the song to sound less "lovey-dovie" with a greater "sense of urgency".

The Lunar: The Silver Star Original Soundtrack was released exclusively in Japan by Toshiba-EMI Records on April 22, 1992, two months before the actual release of the game. The album features full versions of the Japanese opening and ending themes, as well as karaoke arrangements. Most of the game's background themes are presented as multi-song medleys rather than separate tracks. Although an official North American version was never released, many of the songs present on the album were featured as special arrangements on the bonus soundtrack found in the Lunar: Silver Star Story Complete collector's edition, including the English opening theme.

=== Voice ===
Both the Japanese and English adaptations of Lunar: The Silver Star contain roughly fifteen minutes of spoken dialogue from a number of prominent voice actors. Though the game has a number of main and supporting characters, only five are actually voiced during specific story sequences. The Japanese version features Kikuko Inoue as both Alex and Luna, Rei Sakuma as Nall, Kōichi Kitamura as the white dragon Quark, and Rokurō Naya as Ghaleon. The English version comprised mostly new talent and associates of Working Designs' staff, such as a young Ashley Parker Angel as Alex, Rhonda Gibson as Luna, Jackie Powers as Nall, Hal Delahousse as Quark, and John Truitt as Ghaleon. While the entire Japanese cast was replaced for the game's remake on the PlayStation, all of the original English cast would return to reprise their roles.

== Reception ==
Reception

Aggregate score
Aggregator	Score
GameRankings	88%

Review scores
Publication	Score
Electronic Gaming Monthly	7.75/10
Famitsu	26/40
Game Informer	8.5/10
GameFan	97%
GamePro	4.5/5
Electronic Games	86%
Game Players	79%
Sega-16	9/10
VideoGames	9/10
Mean Machines	86%

Award
Publication	Award
GameFan	Best RPG

Lunar: The Silver Star was well received in Japan, selling an estimated 100,000 copies. It sold out its entire Japanese production run in its first year after release, nearly as much as the Mega-CD itself. It is considered the Mega-CD's first hit game, which Sega credits solely for pushing the system's sales in that region. The game remains the best-selling Mega-CD title of all time in Japan, and second highest selling worldwide behind Sonic the Hedgehog CD. Readers of Japanese magazine Megadrive Beep voted it the number one Mega Drive role-playing game for 17 straight months before being trumped by Shining Force II.

The English version was met with positive reception. Reviewers for GameFan magazine praised the graphics, music, and story. The magazine's editors would later name it as the greatest role-playing game of 1993. GamePro considered it to be "not just the best Sega CD RPG ever, but one of the best on any Sega system", giving particular merit to the game's translation. Game Players summarized the game as "a solid RPG, and well worth your time", but felt its graphics were too similar to other RPGs and found the combat system to be dull. Electronic Gaming Monthly had five reviewers, Ed, Dano, Al, Sushi-X, and Mike, give the game scores of 9, 8, 7, 7, and 7, respectively, ranging from "worthy" to "virtually flawless" ratings. The magazine commended its music but would echo a similar sentiment to Game Players, adding that the battle sequences were "a bit dull". EGM's 1999 Video Game Buyer's Guide listed four of these scores, 9, 8, 7, and 7, averaging out to 7.75 out of 10 overall, and described the game as "one of the best RPGs ever".

=== Accolades ===
Mega placed the game at #8 in their top Mega-CD games of all time. In 1995, Flux magazine rated Lunar 76th on their Top 100 Video Games. In 2006, Lunar ranked 113th in EGM and 1UP.com's list of the greatest "videogames of their time", celebrating the games that were considered the best during their original release. Retro Gamer included The Silver Star among their top ten Mega-CD games, noting its "astounding soundtrack" and "fantastic" localization.

== Legacy ==
As the first game in the Lunar series, The Silver Star established many of the themes and characters that would be seen in later installments. The game was followed by Lunar: Eternal Blue in 1994, a direct sequel that takes place one thousand years in The Silver Star's future, and contains many references to the original title. Other follow-ups, including Lunar: Walking School in 1996 and Lunar: Dragon Song in 2005 would act as the game's prequels, taking place many hundred years before the game's story.

=== Remakes ===
Lunar: The Silver Star has been re-made several times by different developers and publishers for a number of consoles between 1996, 2009 and 2025. These games feature graphic and sound enhancements as well as an expanded script.
