= Lunar Legend =

2002 video game

- North American box art
- Developer: Japan Art Media
- Publishers: JP: Media Rings; NA: Ubi Soft
- Composer: Noriyuki Iwadare
- Series: Lunar
- Platform: Game Boy Advance
- Release: JP: April 12, 2002; NA: December 10, 2002
- Genre: Role-playing
- Mode: Single-player

Lunar Legend (LUNAR(ルナ)レジェンド) is a 2002 role-playing video game for Game Boy Advance developed by Japan Art Media and published internationally by Ubi Soft, who also provided the translation. It is a re-telling of the events of Lunar: The Silver Star with story and content changes. All the characters from the original game appear.

== Gameplay ==
Lunar Legend plays very much like a traditional role-playing game, with 2D character sprites and environments. Unlike Lunar: The Silver Star, the battles do not consist of characters moving across the battlefield to attack enemies, instead having them retreat back to their original positions after attacking. The battles themselves are random, occurring every few steps within a dungeon or in scripted circumstances. By gaining experience after each fight, characters can level up, gaining new abilities and becoming stronger in the process. A new feature includes the use of special attacks akin to limit breaks via an "Arts gauge" underneath the character's HP and MP. It fills up as the character attacks enemies (whether or not the hit is successful) and once it's full, the character can unleash a powerful ability that generally does more damage than weapons or spells, or has a special effect such as rendering the party invincible for a short period of time. Ramus, Ghaleon and Laike, however, cannot unleash these special attacks.

Some of these special attacks can be changed by equipping certain items. For example, if Nash or Mia equip the Light Emblem accessory, it changes their special attacks to "Charge", which allows them to store magic power for one round. The next time they cast an attack spell, the damage is increased more than normal.

The player travels through the world of Lunar via the world map, visiting various towns, cities, and dungeons. Unlike The Silver Star, there are no random battles on the world map and each location is accessed by simply selecting it.

== Plot ==
Thousands of years ago, the benevolent Goddess Althena transformed the barren world of the Silver Star into the habitable place known to its inhabitants as "Lunar". In this world, three races were created: the stout Beastmen, the resourceful Humans, and the villainous Vile Tribe. While the Vile Tribe was forced to live in the dark lands known as the Frontier, Humans and Beastmen lived side by side in the surrounding lands, occasionally fighting with each other before eventually declaring peace. In order to preserve the life-force of the planet, as well as guide the elements within it, Althena created four all-powerful dragons and a warrior who wielded their combined power known as the Dragonmaster. She decreed that if anyone was to take up the mantle of Dragonmaster, they would have to pass the four trials of the dragons themselves before gaining the power to protect the world.

One such Dragonmaster was Dyne, a young man who, together with the heroes Ghaleon, Mel, and Lemia, succeeded in pacifying the then-insane black dragon. Althena at this time was losing control of her power, and though Ghaleon protested, Dyne gave up his power to transform the goddess into a mortal girl who immediately reverted into a baby. Never forgiving him for denying the world its leader, Ghaleon severed all ties to Dyne and retired from adventuring. Dyne, now no longer a Dragonmaster, disappeared and was never heard from again.

Years later, a boy named Alex from the small town of Burg is infatuated with stories of Dyne and the Four Heroes, and longs to become an adventurer himself and one day become a Dragonmaster like his idol. With the help of his best friend, Nall, a small, winged, cat-like creature, and Luna, his love interest who has lived with him since she was a child, Alex leaves on his adventure to pass the trials of the Dragons, and ultimately gets caught up in a struggle for the existence of his world.

== Development and release ==
Lunar Legend is a re-made version of Lunar: Silver Star Story Complete for the Game Boy Advance and was developed by Media Rings Corporation after acquiring the rights to produce a handheld adaptation of Game Arts' role-playing game. The game was announced in a November 2001 issue of Japanese Weekly Famitsu magazine as a "powered up" version of the original Sega CD and the 32-bit versions, with changes that would benefit players on the go and provide new story materials for veteran fans. Because of the game's limited 8-megabyte cart size, many features standard to the Lunar series such as voice acting and video sequences were omitted, with Media Rings instead utilizing real-time cutscenes using larger, more detailed character sprites to tell the story. Still images taken directly from Silver Star Story Complete's animated videos would appear at certain points during the game to give it a more cinematic feel. Game Arts' primary goal in co-developing the new version was to provide the previous game's music, art, and script for Media Ring's use. The Lunar series' producer Yoichi Miyaji joined the development team as a consultant, along with several other members of the Game Arts staff, in assisting project director Hisashi Sugawara in crafting a new vision of the game that would retain the same feel as previous adaptations. The game was originally scheduled for a March 2002 release, but was pushed back to the following April for last-minute changes.

The North American version became the first English Lunar title to not be produced by Working Designs, with company president Victor Ireland passing on the project for undisclosed reasons. During the 2002 IEMA Executive Summit, Ubisoft revealed they had acquired the publishing rights to Lunar Legend, with an initial release date of November 2002. Ubisoft's script remained closer to the original Japanese version than previous English endeavors, but retained Working Designs' character names and overall light-hearted tone. Rather than develop their own official Lunar Legend website, Ubisoft approached Mickey Shannon, webmaster of Lunar series fansite LunarNET, to create and host the game's official English page on his server.

== Reception ==
Reception

Aggregate scores
Aggregator	Score
GameRankings	79%
Metacritic	79/100

Review scores
Publication	Score
Electronic Gaming Monthly	8/10
Famitsu	8/10, 7/10, 8/10, 7/10
Game Informer	7.5/10
GamePro	4/5
GameSpot	7.8/10
IGN	7/10

Lunar Legend was mostly well received in North America, with some critics such as Electronic Gaming Monthly commending its re-drawn, animated character sprites, describing the game as "one of the prettiest, most involving RPGs to hit the GBA". GameSpot similarly declared that the game was "fun and engaging", but found the low difficulty lacking in challenge and the audio quality below the standard, commenting that the "generic battle sounds and forgettable music don't leave much of an impression". It was a runner-up for GameSpot's annual "Best Role-Playing Game on Game Boy Advance" award, which went to Tactics Ogre: The Knight of Lodis.

Reviewers often compared the game to its PlayStation predecessor. GamePro saw the game as inferior to its earlier versions, stating that it was "definitely recommended for anyone who didn't live through the Lunar phenomenon, [but] anyone who's played the original is bound to be disappointed", finding fault in the game's lower quality presentation. Game Informer called the game a "solid port" with good enhancements, yet felt that the exclusion of voice-overs and animated cutscenes from the original hurt the game's narrative.
