= Lunar: Sanposuru Gakuen =

1996 video game

- Game Gear box art
- Developer: Ehrgeiz (Note: Direction and scenario by Studio Alex)
- Publishers: Game Arts; Sega Saturn; Entertainment Software Publishing; Kadokawa Shoten
- Series: Lunar
- Platforms: Game Gear, Sega Saturn
- Release: Game Gear: JP: January 12, 1996; Saturn: JP: November 20, 1997
- Genre: Role-playing
- Mode: Single-player

Lunar: Sanposuru Gakuen (LUNAR(ルナ) さんぽする学園; lit. "Lunar: Walking School") is a role-playing video game in the Lunar series released for the Sega Game Gear in Japan in 1996. Since then, no international versions or translations have officially been released, though an unofficial English translation was released in 2009. It was developed by Ehrgeiz and written by Studio Alex.

Even though the game was released after Lunar: The Silver Star, it is set hundreds of years before it. Several creatures and places from the game also make an appearance. The game was remade one year later for the Sega Saturn as Mahō Gakuen Lunar!

== Gameplay ==
The game has several elements common to role-playing video games, with 2D character sprites and environments. During the game, the player will encounter monsters that are fought randomly within dungeons, and gain experience from winning battles. Magic and additional skills are unlocked through leveling up, as well as allowing the characters to grow stronger. The battles take place from a first-person perspective, with menus appearing along the left edge of the screen.

The character menu can be accessed at any time and allow the use of items, magic, or other gameplay settings. A player's progress is saved on one of three possible slots using the Game Gear's battery back-up.

== Plot ==
Lunar: Walking School tells the tale of a young girl named Ellie and her best friend, Lena, as they leave their quiet lives as field workers in the town of Burg to enroll in a newly established magic school located on an island called Ien. There, along with several other youths, the girls find the school and the area around it completely deserted, and try to establish order by getting all the students together within the surrounding town. During their stay, they encounter several magical creatures and monsters who also call the island home, all while they continue to search for their instructors.

The game itself is divided into 12 chapters, each one presented with a curtain closing and opening.

=== Characters ===
Playable characters:

- Ellie: The main character of the story who grew up in a small town working on her father's farm. She is selected along with her best friend Lena to attend the floating magic school. Somewhat quiet and reserved, she is very loyal to her friends and has a naturally curious personality.
- Lena: Ellie's best friend since childhood. Unlike Ellie, she is very talkative and often sticks up for herself when bullied about her height. She likes to wear fancy clothing and is quite self-confident.
- Senia: A young Beastwoman who attends the magic school with Ellie and Lena. Though she is very strong and athletic, she can command some powerful magic as well. She is almost as vocal as Lena, and the two of them became fast friends.
- Wing: A mysterious and quiet boy who is a later addition to the school's roster. Naturally gifted at using magic, Wing makes a name for himself early, and is actually enrolled on a scholarship.

Other characters:

- Ant, Kule and Rick: Three boys accepted into the magic school who make it their business to tease and otherwise make life difficult for Ellie and Lena. Eventually, they warm up to each other, but only after a lengthy exchange of insults.
- Barua: Second-in-command of the Vile Tribe who has an interest in Wing. He commands a wide assortment of dark magic.
- Memphis: Power-hungry leader of the Vile Tribe who worships an entity known as "D".

== Remake ==
A battle in Mahō Gakuen Lunar!

Mahō Gakuen Lunar! (魔法学園ルナ！; lit. 'Magic School Lunar!') is an enhanced remake of Sanposuru Gakuen with updated graphics, newly added anime cutscenes, and a more complex story. It was developed by Game Arts in association with Studio Alex and published by ESP Software and Kadokawa Shoten for the Sega Saturn in 1997. Magic School Lunar! was released about the same time as other Lunar remakes, Lunar: Silver Star Story Complete and Lunar 2: Eternal Blue Complete, and though it was mildly successful it was never made available outside Japan.

Several enhancements were made to the game to take advantage of the capabilities of the more powerful hardware. While the original game was limited to the hardware restrictions of the Game Gear, the new Saturn version boasts a larger color palette, more sophisticated music and sound effects, and the ability to handle full-motion animated sequences placed sporadically throughout the story. The use of a Saturn memory card could also ensure more save slots. The first-person perspective battle interface of the Game Gear version is replaced by a simplified version of the signature Lunar battle system. Character sprites are visible on the battlefield and animations for spells and attacks have been considerably upgraded. A number of multi-character combination attacks have been added as well.

== Reception ==
Reception

Review score
Publication	Score
Famitsu	6/10, 4/10, 6/10, 4/10

Reviewing the game in Famitsu, one reviewer said the gameplay mechanics and difficulty were well balanced and appreciated the large scale sprites to make them clear on the Game Gear's small screen.Two reviewers in the magazine said that battles are too fast paced, with one saying it was difficult to check your characters status in-between battles. Two other reviewers discussed the scope of the game with one reviewer saying the towns and houses in the game were too large so it was too easy to get lost, while another said there as too much tedious back and forth travelling in the game.
