= Shangri-La Frontier =

Japanese web novel and its adaptations

- First tankōbon volume cover of the manga adaptation, featuring Sunraku

シャングリラ・フロンティア～クソゲーハンター、神ゲーに挑まんとす～ (Shangurira Furontia Kusogē Hantā, Kamigē ni Idoman to Su)
- Genre: Adventure; Fantasy
- Novel series
- Written by: Katarina
- Published by: Shōsetsuka ni Narō
- Original run: May 19, 2017 – present
- Manga
- Written by: Katarina
- Illustrated by: Ryosuke Fuji
- Published by: Kodansha
- English publisher: NA: Kodansha USA
- Imprint: Shōnen Magazine Comics
- Magazine: Weekly Shōnen Magazine
- Original run: July 15, 2020 – present
- Volumes: 28
- Anime television series
- Directed by: Toshiyuki Kubooka (Note: Director for the first two seasons and chief director for the third one); Hiro Ōki (S3)
- Written by: Kazuyuki Fudeyasu
- Music by: Ryūichi Takada; Kuniyuki Takahashi; Keiichi Hirokawa
- Studio: C2C
- Licensed by: Crunchyroll (Note: In North America through Crunchyroll, LLC.); SEA: Muse Communication
- Original network: JNN (MBS, TBS)
- Original run: October 1, 2023 – present
- Episodes: 50
- Video game

Shangri-La Frontier: Nanatsu no Saikyō-shu
- Developer: Netmarble Nexus
- Publisher: Netmarble
- Released: 2026
- icon

Shangri-La Frontier (Note: Japanese: シャングリラ・フロンティア～クソゲーハンター、神ゲーに挑まんとす～, Hepburn: Shangurira Furontia Kusogē Hantā, Kamigē ni Idoman to Su; lit. 'Shangri-La Frontier: Crappy Game Hunter Challenges God-Tier Game') is a Japanese web novel series written by Katarina. Its serialization began on the novel publishing website Shōsetsuka ni Narō in May 2017. A manga adaptation, illustrated by Ryosuke Fuji, has been serialized in Kodansha's shōnen manga magazine Weekly Shōnen Magazine since July 2020, with its chapters collected in 28 tankōbon volumes as of October 2026.

The series follows Rakuro Hizutome, a teenager who enjoys playing "trash games"—old-fashioned and faulty video games that only appeal to a certain audience. After having mastered these games, despite their difficulty due to their glitches, Rakuro decides to change things up and play the acclaimed best-selling virtual reality game Shangri-La Frontier—a full-dive VR game with 30 million registered players. Rakuro enters the game as Sunraku, his bird-masked player character, and all the skills and experience that he acquired playing trash games will serve him in this new game.

An anime television series adaptation produced by C2C aired from October 2023 to March 2024. A second season aired from October 2024 to March 2025. A third season is set to premiere in January 2027.

By March 2026, the manga had over 16 million copies in circulation. It won the 47th Kodansha Manga Award in the shōnen category in 2023.

== Plot ==
The story is set in a near future, where games that use old-fashioned display screens are classified as retro games, while full-dive VR games have become commonplace. As a result of these games becoming mainstream, there exist many so-called "trash games": rushed, full of glitches, faulty games, the systems of which have not kept up with the improved visual technology. Rakuro Hizutome is a "trash game hunter", a great admirer of these usually shameful games, which he plays with the nickname Sunraku until he is able to master them regardless of the difficulty due to their glitches. Rakuro has cleared the oversized Faeria Chronicle Online trash game and is suffering a sort of burnout syndrome. At the suggestion of the owner of his favorite game store, "RockRoll", he buys the best-selling and excellent Shangri-La Frontier, a full-dive VR game with 30 million registered players. He enters the world of Shangri-La Frontier as Sunraku, his bird-masked player character, where all the skills he has attained as an expert trash game hunter will come in handy as he progresses in the game.

== Characters ==
Sunraku (サンラク, Sanraku) / Rakuro Hizutome (陽務 楽郎, Hizutome Rakurō)
Voiced by: Yuma Uchida (Japanese); Eric Vale (English)
Rakuro is a major enthusiast for trash games, to the point that he has built up a collection of them. His performance is affected by his mood. His gaming alias Sunraku is partly derived from his real name, with "Sun" substituting for "Hizu", which means sun.
Psyger-0 (サイガ-0, Saiga Zero) / Rei Saiga (斎賀 玲, Saiga Rei)
Voiced by: Azumi Waki (Japanese); Corey Pettit (English)
A classmate of Rakuro. She has a crush on him, but is too shy to tell him. When she finds out he has joined SLF, she tries to meet up with him so they can become in-game friends.
Arthur Pencilgon (アーサー・ペンシルゴン, Āsā Penshirugon) / Towa Amane (天音 永遠, Amane Towa)
Voiced by: Yoko Hikasa (Japanese); Brianna Roberts (English)
A player killer in Shangri-La Frontier. Sunraku first met her in another game, where he led a raid on her castle with the help of Oikatzo.
Oikatzo (オイカッツォ, Oikattso) / Kei Uomi (魚臣 慧, Uomi Kei)
Voiced by: Makoto Koichi (Japanese); Brittney Karbowski (English)
A pro gamer of fighting games and a longtime friend of Sunraku. He joins Shangri-La Frontier on Sunraku's recommendation, and creates a female brawler.
Emul (エムル, Emuru)
Voiced by: Rina Hidaka (Japanese); Molly Zhang (English)
A vorpal bunny from Rabbituza. Sunraku meets her after his encounter with Lycagon. She allows him exclusive access to Rabbituza, and introduces him to the many important NPCs found there.
Vysache (ヴァイスアッシュ, Vaisuasshu)
Voiced by: Akio Otsuka (Japanese); Christopher Guerrero (English)
Psyger-100 (サイガ-100, Saiga Handoreddo) / Momo Saiga (斎賀 百, Saiga Momo)
Voiced by: Yumiri Hanamori (Japanese); Morgan Berry (English)
Rei's older sister, and leader of the Schwarz Vulf guild.
Animalia (アニマリア, Animaria)
Voiced by: Sayaka Senbongi (Japanese); Kelsey Maher (English)
A druid who leads the guild SF Zoo. She is obsessed with animals, and is obsessed with Emul.
Orcelott (オルスロット, Orusurotto)
Voiced by: Seiichiro Yamashita (Japanese); Sonny Strait (English)
Bilac (ビィラック, Biirakku)
Voiced by: Miyu Tomita (Japanese); Lindsay Seidel (English)
Older sister to Emul, she is the blacksmith of Rabbituza.
Peatz (ピーツ, Pītsu)
Voiced by: Satsumi Matsuda (Japanese); Tabitha Garland (English)
Setsuna Amatsuki (天津気 刹那, Amatsuki Setsuna) / Setsuna of Bygone Days (遠き日のセツナ, Tōki Hi no Setsuna)
Voiced by: Asami Seto (Japanese); Megan Shipman (English)
A ghost NPC who only appears in a secret area at night who has ties to Wehtermon. Pencilgon feels a deep connection with her.
Wethermon the Tombguard (墓守のウェザエモン, Hakamori no Wezaemon)
Voiced by: Show Hayami (Japanese); Bradley Gareth (English)
One of the Seven Colossi, he only appears during a full moon.
Tsukuyo Tsukuri (継久理 創世, Tsukuri Tsukuyo)
Voiced by: Ami Koshimizu (Japanese); Michelle Rojas (English)
Ritsu Amachi (天地 律, Amachi Ritsu)
Voiced by: Kaori Nazuka (Japanese); Sarah Roach (English)
Sakai Tsukuyogi (木兎夜枝 境, Tsukuyogi Sakai)
Voiced by: Kenji Nojima (Japanese); Daniel Van Thomas (English)
Professor (キョージュ, Kyōju)
Voiced by: Jouji Nakata (Japanese); Gabe Kunda (English)
Leader of the Library guild, dedicated to cataloguing the lore of SLF. Despite having a young girl as an avatar, he's got a deep masculine voice.
Aramis (アラミース, Aramīsu)
Voiced by: Hiromu Mineta (Japanese); Ian Sinclair (English)
A cait sith who is deeply in love with Bilac.
Akane Akitsu (秋津 茜, Akitsu Akane)
Voiced by: Yuka Terasaki (Japanese); Krystal LaPorte (English)
The second player to gain access to Rabbituza, she has a deep devotion to Sunraku.
Ceecrue (シークルゥ, Shīkurū)
Voiced by: Natsuki Hanae (Japanese); Kieran Flitton (English)
One of Emul's many siblings, he's a samurai who shows Akitsu Akane Rabbituza.
Rust (ルスト, Rusuto)
Voiced by: Rie Takahashi (Japanese); Colleen Clinkenbeard (English)
The number one PVP fighter in Nephilim Hollow.
Mold (モルド, Morudo)
Voiced by: Kaito Ishikawa (Japanese); Anthony Bowling (English)
Rust's Spotter. He analyses her opponents and advises her in fights.
Stude (スチューデ, Suchūde)
Voiced by: Aki Kanada (Japanese); Sara Ragsdale (English)
Araba (アラバ)
Voiced by: Tōru Sakurai (Japanese); Cris George (English)
Megumi Natsume (夏目 恵, Natsume Megumi)
Voiced by: Yumi Uchiyama (Japanese); Marisa Duran (English)
Sylvia Goldberg (シルヴィア・ゴールドバーグ, Shiruvia Gōrudobāgu)
Voiced by: Minami Takahashi

== Production ==
=== Web novel ===
While living overseas, author Katarina read The Irregular at Magic High School on the Shōsetsuka ni Narō website, which inspired him to begin writing novels. Although reincarnation-type fantasy stories were popular on the site at the time, he was particularly impressed by virtual reality narratives and the distinctive appeal of VR games, which eventually led to the creation of Shangri-La Frontier. For the title, Katarina chose "frontier" to evoke a sense of pioneering exploration. He paired it with "Shangri-La" after considering terms for a paradise or "Garden of Eden", as the game's world represented such a place. He also contemplated "Eldorado", but selected "Shangri-La" after learning its origin in a novel by James Hilton, where it refers to a lamasery housing the world's wisdom. This aligned with his concept of a game world where players uncover knowledge from a lost advanced civilization.

Katarina developed the series' worldbuilding first, focusing on its cultures and settings before creating its player characters. He maintains a fan-made, Wikipedia-like resource to track story details, characters, and events when his own memory is unclear. While the major story arcs and ending were planned early, minor adventures are developed during the writing process.

Katarina cited the light novel series Is It Wrong to Try to Pick Up Girls in a Dungeon? as a major influence, alongside the novel series Deltora Quest, whose world he imagines while writing. Video game inspirations include Final Fantasy XI, Monster Hunter, Dark Souls, and Xenoblade.

Sunraku was conceived as a character who enjoys the unpredictable challenge of "trash games". His distinctive bird mask (modeled after a shoebill) and minimal attire were inspired by players in games like Dark Souls who defeat bosses while wearing only headgear. Unlike series such as Sword Art Online or .hack, where characters are trapped in-game, Sunraku moves between the game and reality. Katarina emphasized that a life-threatening stake is unnecessary for tension, drawing parallels to real-world gamers who persistently attempt challenging segments for enjoyment. The narrative is deliberately presented from Sunraku's perspective as a novice player to enhance reader identification.

The dynamic between Sunraku, Arthur, and Oikatzo was inspired by the banter in Hollywood films, characterized by teasing that reflects underlying friendship and mutual understanding.

=== Manga ===
Katarina was approached via a private message on Twitter by an editor proposing a manga adaptation. Ryosuke Fuji, known for illustrating the Attack on Titan: Lost Girls manga and having worked as a manga assistant, was selected as the artist. Unfamiliar with the novel initially, Fuji accepted due to his personal interest as a gamer. The series was originally planned for Magazine Pocket, but it was later decided that it would be serialized in Weekly Shōnen Magazine instead.

Fuji creates drafts based on Katarina's detailed descriptions for world and character designs, which Katarina then reviews and approves. Visually, Fuji drew inspiration from the European Middle Ages and the video game Horizon Zero Dawn for creature and world design. For action sequences, he employs techniques to ensure clarity, such as wide shots influenced by Dragon Ball. Fuji conducts extensive research, using reference photos for elements like skies to achieve realism, and watches streamer videos to inform Sunraku's actions.

Sunraku's design, including his shoebill mask, was based on Katarina's specifications. The character was initially described wearing sandals in the novel, but Fuji's sketch of him barefoot was approved for the visual medium. While Sunraku's design was firmly established, Fuji had creative freedom with other characters, which Katarina endorsed. Early chapters required adaptation to reduce Sunraku's internal monologue from the novel; the introduction of other characters later facilitated dialogue-based exposition.

Monster designs are developed in tandem with battle scenes, with Fuji planning key moments first. He found drawing the rabbit tribe particularly enjoyable, while Wethermon the Tombguard was both challenging and rewarding.

=== Anime ===
The anime adaptation was proposed in February 2020, prior to the manga's serialization. A promotional video combining animated footage and manga panels, narrated by Azumi Waki and featuring Yuma Uchida as Sunraku, was released on July 7, 2021, to mark the manga's first anniversary; Uchida later reprised the role in the anime series.

Katarina participated in anime production meetings, providing supervision and additional worldbuilding details. Fuji, trusting the adaptation team, was less involved but provided reference materials from the manga when consulted on visual elements like colors and environments.

== Media ==
=== Web novel ===
The web novel series written by Katarina started on May 19, 2017, on the user-generated novel publishing website Shōsetsuka ni Narō. No printed version of the novel series has been released, despite numerous requests.

=== Manga ===
A manga adaptation illustrated by Ryosuke Fuji has been serialized in Kodansha's Weekly Shōnen Magazine since July 15, 2020. Kodansha has collected its chapters into individual tankōbon volumes. The first volume was released on October 16, 2020. As of October 16, 2026, 28 volumes have been released.

In North America, Kodansha USA announced the English-language digital release of the manga in November 2020. In November 2021, Kodansha USA announced that it would begin releasing the series in print, with the first volume released on September 6, 2022.

=== Anime ===
In July 2022, an anime television series adaptation produced by C2C was announced. The series is directed by Toshiyuki Kubooka, with Hiroki Ikeshita serving as assistant director, Kazuyuki Fudeyasu supervising and writing the series' scripts, Ayumi Kurashima designing the characters, and Monaca composers Ryūichi Takada, Kuniyuki Takahashi, and Keiichi Hirokawa composing the music. The first 25-episode season aired from October 1, 2023, to March 31, 2024, in the Nichigo time slot on all JNN affiliates, including MBS and TBS. The first opening theme song is "Broken Games", performed by FZMZ, and the first ending theme song is "Ace", performed by Chico. The second opening theme song is "Danger Danger", performed by FZMZ featuring Icy (later revealed to be Reol), and the second ending theme song is "Gajumaru: Heaven in the Rain" (ガジュマル ～Heaven in the Rain～), performed by Reona. Aniplex collected the episodes on two DVD and Blu-ray Disc sets, released on March 27 and June 26, 2024.

A second season aired from October 13, 2024, to March 30, 2025, in the same time slot as the first season. For the second season, the first opening theme song is "Queen", performed by Lisa, and the first ending theme song is "Anya no Dancer: Dancer in the Dark Night" (闇夜のダンサー -Dancer in the Dark Night), performed by Otoha. The second opening theme song is "Frontiers", performed by Awich, and the second ending theme is "RealitYhurts", performed by Cvlte.

A third season was announced after the final episode of the second season. It is set to premiere on January 10, 2027, and will run for two consecutive cours. Hiro Ōki directs the third season, with Kubooka serving as chief director and Naoki Kotani as assistant director.

==== English release ====
Crunchyroll has licensed the series for streaming outside of East Asia. The company has released the first season on two Blu-ray Disc sets; the first volume was released on March 4, 2025, and the second one on April 9 of that same year. The second season was released on a single Blu-ray Disc set on April 24, 2026. Muse Communication licensed the series in Southeast Asia.

=== Video game ===
On July 7, 2022, a video game adaptation, developed by Netmarble Nexus and published by Netmarble, was announced. Titled Shangri-La Frontier: Nanatsu no Saikyō-shu (シャングリラ・フロンティア ～七つの最強種～, Shangurira Furontia Nanatsu no Saikyō-shu; 'Shangri-La Frontier: The Seven Colossi'), it is set to release in 2026.

== Reception ==
By April 2024, the manga had over 8 million copies in circulation; by September of the same year, it had over 10 million copies in circulation; by April 2025, it had over 12 million copies in circulation; by March 2026, it had over 16 million copies in circulation.

The manga ranked eleventh on the "Nationwide Bookstore Employees' Recommended Comics of 2021" by the Honya Club website. It placed fifth in the 2021 Next Manga Award in the print category. The manga was nominated for the 46th Kodansha Manga Award in the shōnen category in 2022; it won the 47th edition in the same category in 2023.
