= Lunar (series) =

Video game series

- Genre: Role-playing
- Developers: Game Arts; Studio Alex; Ehrgeiz; Japan Art Media
- Platforms: Sega CD; Game Gear; Sega Saturn; PlayStation; Windows; Game Boy Advance; Nintendo DS; PlayStation Portable; iOS; Android; Nintendo Switch; PlayStation 4; Xbox One
- First release: Lunar: The Silver Star; June 23, 1992
- Latest release: Lunar Remastered Collection; April 18, 2025

Lunar (Note: Japanese: LUNAR(ルナ), Hepburn: Runa) is a role-playing video game series created by Game Arts and Studio Alex. The story takes place on the moon "Lunar", which orbits an uninhabitable planet known as "The Blue Star". The first two games, Lunar: The Silver Star (1992) and Lunar: Eternal Blue (1994), were released for the Sega CD and serve as the series foundation.

The Silver Star and Eternal Blue received critical and commercial acclaim, later becoming the two highest-selling games on the platform in Japan. Remakes of the original games have been released for multiple platforms in the decades since, including Silver Star Story Complete, Eternal Blue Complete, Lunar Legend, Silver Star Harmony, and Remastered Collection. Three spin-off games have been released.

== Plot ==
The Lunar stories take place on a habitable moon called Lunar, or "The Silver Star", that orbits a planet known as "The Blue Star". Thousands of years ago, the Blue Star was infected with evil by a dark god named Zophar. His evil corrupted the hearts of people, turning some into monsters to do his bidding. The survivors cried out to the patron-deity of the Blue Star, a Goddess named Althena, for help. She confronted Zophar in an epic battle, and was only able to stop him by using her powers of creation to seal him in another dimension, destroying nearly all life on the planet in the process.

Unable to restore the planet until several millennia had passed, Althena instead chose to transform the planet's moon into an earthlike world, and transported the survivors there. These included not only humans but also a race of "beast-men", and another race of elf-like beings skilled in wielding magic. The only elf-like being depicted in Lunar is Ghaleon, who is a confirmed member of the Vile Tribe in "Lunar: Vane Hikuusen Monogatari", which is mysteriously classified here as a "fourth race", despite there being only three. There was also a fourth race of people who would later come to be known as "The Vile Tribe" after they rejected Althena's teachings. She was forced to banish them to an area of Lunar called "The Frontier", a barren wasteland where even Althena's magical power could not reach. They became enemies of Althena and her followers for thousands of years.

To protect Lunar, Althena created four intelligent Dragons – a white one, a red one, a blue one, and a black one – that each shared a part of her divine power. There are only four Dragons at any given time, though they are replaced over time with younger ones. Strangely, during their infancy, these dragons resemble talking, winged cats, until they claim the power of their predecessor and ascend to adulthood. The Dragons spend most of their time sleeping underground until they are needed.

Althena also decreed that there would be a champion called The Dragonmaster to lead Lunar's heroes. This person would be anyone who managed to make their way to the hidden lairs of the Four Dragons, and pass their harrowing trials. There have been many Dragonmasters across the centuries, and many on Lunar have striven to achieve that title. The people of Lunar became very devoted to Althena, though many remember Lunar's origins as only an old legend. The various Lunar games and manga cover different events in Lunar's history.

== Games ==
Release timeline
| 1992 | Lunar: The Silver Star |
1993
| 1994 | Lunar: Eternal Blue |
1995
| 1996 | Lunar: Sanposuru Gakuen |
| 1996 | Lunar: Silver Star Story Complete |
| 1997 | Maho Gakuen Lunar! |
| 1998 | Lunar 2: Eternal Blue Complete |
| 1999 | All the Lunar: Hyper Applications |
2000–2001
| 2002 | Lunar Legend |
2003–2004
| 2005 | Lunar: Dragon Song |
2006–2008
| 2009 | Lunar: Silver Star Harmony |
2010–2024
| 2025 | Lunar Remastered Collection |

=== Original games ===
- Lunar: The Silver Star was first released on June 26, 1992, in Japan for the Sega CD. The game follows Alex, a young boy from a small town who dreams of one day becoming a great hero like his idol, Dragonmaster Dyne. Making use of the CD-ROM format, the game features CD-quality music, full motion video and voice acting. Working Designs handled the English localization, releasing the game in December 1993 in North America. It was a critical and commercial success, becoming the best selling title on the platform in Japan, and second highest-selling overall.
- Lunar: Eternal Blue was first released on December 22, 1994, in Japan for the Sega CD. Taking place a thousand years after the events of the first game, it follows Hiro, a young adventurer, and Lucia, a girl from the far-away planet Blue Star, as they try to stop an evil, all-powerful being from destroying the world. Compared to its predecessor, Eternal Blue features twice the text and over four times the amount of original animation. Working Designs handled the English localization once more, releasing the game in September 1995 in North America. While the game was well received, it sold less copies than The Silver Star, which was mostly attributed to it being a late release for the platform.

=== Remakes ===
- Lunar: Silver Star Story Complete was first released on October 25, 1996, in Japan for the Sega Saturn. A version with higher-quality video via the Video CD card add-on was released a year later. The game is a remake of The Silver Star with an expanded scenario and improved graphics and sound. While the original Sega CD version included roughly ten minutes of animation, the remake features fifty minutes of new, fully animated cutscenes by Studio Gonzo. The game was ported to the PlayStation on May 28, 1998, with an English release by Working Designs arriving a year later. A Windows version was released for the Japanese and Korean markets, with a North American release eventually scrapped. It received generally positive reviews. Versions for iOS and Android were released in 2012 and 2024 respectively, as Lunar: Silver Star Story Touch.
- Lunar: Eternal Blue Complete was first released on July 23, 1998, in Japan for the Sega Saturn. The game is a remake of Eternal Blue with an expanded scenario and improved graphics and sound, much like Silver Star Story Complete before it. A PlayStation version followed on May 27, 1999, with an English release by Working Designs arriving a year later, on December 15, 2000. It received generally positive reviews.
- Lunar Legend was first released on April 12, 2002, in Japan for the Game Boy Advance. The game is a remake of The Silver Star, largely based on Silver Star Story Complete, with some alterations. The English localization was handled by Ubisoft, with the game releasing on December 10, 2002, in North America. Due to limitations of the cartridge format, many features standard to the series such as voice acting and FMV were omitted, with the developers instead utilizing real-time cutscenes using larger, more detailed character sprites to tell the story. Still images taken directly from Silver Star Story Complete's cutscenes appear at certain points during the game to give it a more cinematic feel. It received generally positive reviews.
- Lunar: Silver Star Harmony was first released on November 12, 2009, in Japan for the PlayStation Portable. The game is a remake of The Silver Star. While it retains the animated cutscenes from Silver Star Story Complete, it features a new playable prologue, a more talkative main character, a remixed soundtrack, and newly recorded voice acting and English localization by Xseed Games. It received generally positive reviews.
- Lunar Remastered Collection was released worldwide on April 18, 2025, for the Nintendo Switch, PlayStation 4, Windows and Xbox One. It is a two-game remastered compilation containing Silver Star Story Complete and Eternal Blue Complete with widescreen support, upscaled visuals, additional language options and quality-of-life features. It was developed by Ashibi Co. and published by GungHo Online Entertainment.

=== Spin-offs ===
- Lunar: Sanposuru Gakuen was first released on January 12, 1996, in Japan for the Game Gear. The game follows a young girl named Ellie and her best friend, Lena, as they leave their quiet lives in the town of Burg to enroll in a newly established magic school located on an island called Ien. A remake titled Mahō Gakuen Lunar! was released a year later for the Sega Saturn. While neither has received an official English release, a fan-translation patch for the Game Gear version was released in 2009.
- All the Lunar: Hyper Applications was first released in July 1999, in Japan for Windows. Rather than being a traditional game, the CD-ROM contains a variety of software for Windows-based operational systems, as well as wallpapers, art galleries and a digital daifugō card game with characters from Silver Star Story and Eternal Blue.
- Lunar: Dragon Song, known in Japan and Europe as Lunar Genesis, was first released on August 25, 2005, in Japan for the Nintendo DS. Taking place a thousand years before the events of The Silver Star, the game follows Jian Campbell, a young delivery boy and adventurer who must save the world from the rising menace of the Vile Tribe. Notably, it was the first game in the series to be released in Europe. It received mixed reviews

== Reception ==
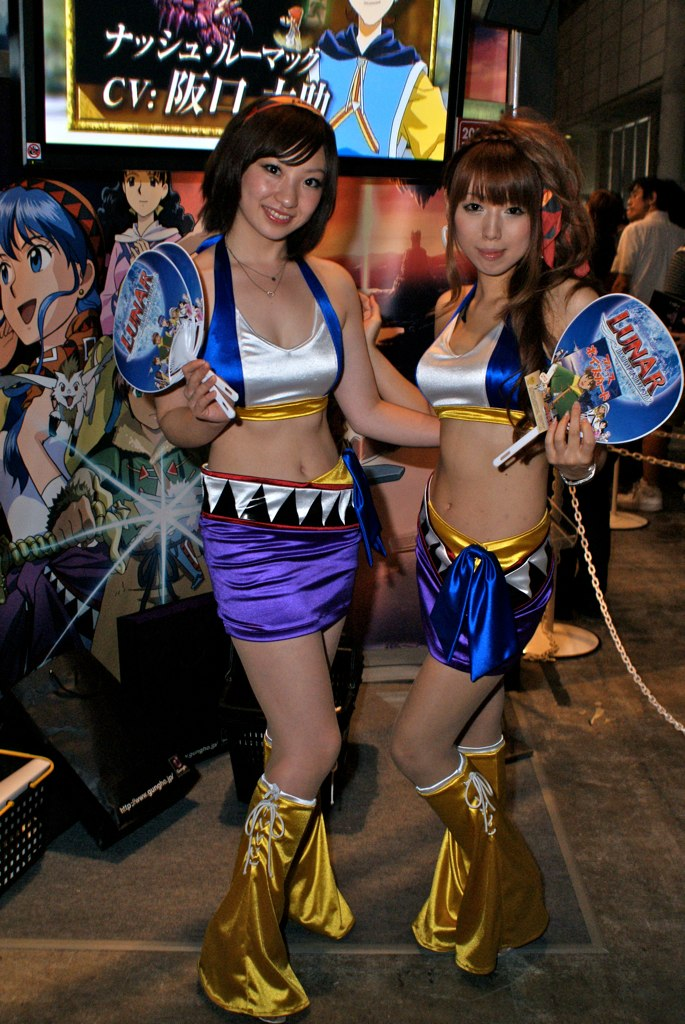
Promotion of Lunar: Silver Star Harmony at TGS 2009

The Lunar series has spawned a variety of other works in the setting, including a manga series, two artbooks, as well as novelizations of The Silver Star, Magic School Lunar! and Eternal Blue. The console titles have generally been received very positively; the two PlayStation versions generally place well in considerations of the best games available for the system. The original two games, and their remakes, have reviewed very well, averaging between 82% and 91%, and with Eternal Blue generally agreed to be the highest-reviewed Sega CD title in the history of the platform. Lunar Dragon Song, however, was panned critically, with an aggregate rating of 58% on GameRankings.

=== Sales ===
The series has sold over one million copies, placing it among the best-selling Japanese role-playing game franchises.

Total sales of Lunar franchise – 1,052,011:

- Lunar: The Silver Star (Sega CD) – 100,000 (Japan)
- Lunar: Eternal Blue (Sega CD) – 89,480 (Japan)
- Lunar: Silver Star Story Complete (Sega Saturn) – 200,035 (original release) in Japan; 8,346 (MPEG Version) in Japan
- Lunar 2: Eternal Blue Complete (Sega Saturn) – 90,837 (Japan)
- Mahō Gakuen Lunar! (Sega Saturn) – 15,999 (Japan)
- Lunar: Silver Star Story Complete (PlayStation) – 44,802 (Japan)
- Lunar 2: Eternal Blue Complete (PlayStation) – 53,983 (Japan)
- PlayStation releases – 393,000 (US)
- Lunar Legend (Game Boy Advance) – 13,506 (Japan)
- Lunar Genesis (Nintendo DS) – 24,673 (Japan)
- Lunar: Silver Star Harmony (PSP) – 17,350 (Japan)

== Abandoned sequel ==
Since the release of the enhanced remakes of Lunar: Silver Star Story and Lunar 2: Eternal Blue, rumors have come and gone concerning the development of a game known only as Lunar 3. In a 1998 interview, Victor Ireland, president of Working Designs, stated that Lunar 3 was in the design phase. However, no such game was ever revealed by Game Arts or Entertainment Software Publishing, the Japanese publisher of the series. At the time Ireland, as part of a feud with Sega of America, repeatedly brought up during interviews that Working Designs held the American publication rights to the Lunar series and would only publish the games for non-Sega consoles, even threatening to port the games to competing consoles themselves if they were released exclusively for Sega consoles in Japan.
