= Grandia (disambiguation) =

Grandia may refer to:

- Grandia (series), video game franchise
- Grandia (video game), first game
- Grandia II, second game
- Grandia III, third game
- Grandia Xtreme, PS2 game
- Grandia Online, online game
- Grandia: Parallel Trippers, GBC game
- Grandia: Digital Museum, other game
