= Grandia: Parallel Trippers =

2000 video game

- Developer: Game Arts
- Publisher: Hudson Soft
- Composer: Noriyuki Iwadare
- Series: Grandia
- Platform: Game Boy Color
- Release: JP: December 22, 2000
- Genre: Role-playing
- Mode: Single-player

Grandia: Parallel Trippers (グランディア パラレルトリッパーズ, Gurandia Parareru Toripasu) is a role-playing video game developed by Game Arts for the Game Boy Color handheld system as part of their Grandia series. Published by Hudson Soft and released exclusively in Japan in December 2000, the game is a spin-off of the first Grandia title, and features characters, music, and a similar battle system to the original. Unlike its predecessor, Parallel Trippers is presented using entirely two-dimensional graphics and character sprites, with combat sequences that take place from first-person perspective that utilize "Synthesis Cards" instead of direct actions. New features include a database of all possible combat actions, as well a monster and character catalog that fills as the player progresses through the game.

The game follows Yuuhi, a young boy living in Japan who is transported along with his friends Mizuki and Shirou to an alternate version of the Grandia world populated by characters from the original video game. Players must guide Yuuhi around numerous environments to re-unite with his friends and discover a way home.

== Gameplay ==
Dialogue scene between Yuuhi and Sue from the original Grandia

Grandia: Parallel Trippers is a traditional role-playing video game that is presented using two-dimensional graphics and character sprites and is presented using an overhead perspective. Players must guide the main character Yuuhi through a number of environments containing non-player characters, enemy monsters, traps, and puzzles that must be overcome in order to advance. Obstacles such as ledges and pits may be overcome by jumping, and other hindrances such as barricades and walls may be crossed using switches found in the area. The accompanying character Pinky, a rotund, flying creature with large ears, can also be used to manipulate objects from a distance. Treasure chests containing beneficial items such as healing herbs and equipment are scattered throughout each area, in addition to hidden items that must be found by searching certain objects. Like the original Grandia, enemies in Parallel Trippers are visible on the map screen, and are only engaged when a player comes in contact with one.

Combat in Parallel Trippers has been modified from the original game, yet still retains the Initiative Point Gauge ("IP Gauge") for determining the order of actions. Neither characters in the player's party nor enemy monsters move about the combat field, and are instead restricted to fixed positions observed from a first-person perspective. As a party member or enemy's turn approaches, a representative icon on the bottom of the screen moves along the IP Gauge to its end, the speed of which being determined by the particular character's "speed" rating. Once a character's icon has reached the end of the gauge, it becomes their turn to act, with all other activity halting until the player has selected their action. Players may choose to attack an enemy or use a magic-based attack by selecting an appropriate "Synthesis Card" from their inventory. Synthesis Cards may also be used in combination with each other to produce additional effects or unlock special magic attacks. As a player's party defeats enemies, they earn experience points that go toward gaining levels, making each character stronger. Throughout battles, players also collect data on enemy monsters, actions, and characters that are stored in the game's database accessible from the title screen.

== Development ==
Grandia: Parallel Trippers was announced in July 2000 by its publisher Hudson Soft, who revealed that they, along with Game Arts, would be bringing the game to the Game Boy Color as the series' first handheld title. Game Arts president Hirokazu Miyazki explained that the game was created to make a Grandia that users could "play anywhere", and was designed under the philosophy that both new and veteran fans of the series could enjoy the title equally. Hudson Soft was personally chosen by Game Arts as the game's publisher due to their experience with handheld titles and enthusiasm in marketing the game to Japanese audiences. The game was first showcased at the 2000 Nintendo Space World expo the following August, and again at the 2000 Tokyo Game Show in September, where the game received its final release date. Following the game's release, Huson Soft launched its "Grandia Nippo" (lit. "Grandia Daily") website that featured fan art, interviews, and special downloads related to Parallel Trippers in order to increase enthusiasm for the game. The music for Parallel Trippers consists of downsampled versions of tracks from the original Grandia, originally composed by Noriyuki Iwadare.

== Reception ==
Reception

Review score
| Publication | Score |
|---|---|
| Famitsu | 24 / 40 |

Japanese response to Grandia: Parallel Trippers was mild, with Weekly Famitsu magazine granting the game a 24 out of 40 score. In a hands-on preview of the game, IGN found it to be a very generic role-playing title, remarking that "While Grandia didn't look or play poorly, there was nothing here that differentiated itself from all the rest of the big-headed, overhead, 2D RPGs that were on the Game Boy Color". The website additionally felt that Parallel Trippers was too loosely associated with the original, adding that it was "really only Grandia in characters, since the game doesn't look a thing like the Grandia you've played on the 32-bit consoles."
