= Grandia III =

2005 video game

- North American box art
- Developer: Game Arts
- Publisher: Square Enix
- Director: Hidenobu Takahashi
- Producer: Wataru Higuchi
- Artists: Akihisa Sako; Kentaro Yokokawa
- Writers: Yuzo Sunaga; Takahiro Hasebe
- Composer: Noriyuki Iwadare
- Series: Grandia
- Platform: PlayStation 2
- Release: JP: August 4, 2005; NA: February 14, 2006
- Genre: Role-playing
- Mode: Single-player

Grandia III (グランディアIII, Gurandia Surī) is a role-playing video game developed by Game Arts and published by Square Enix for the PlayStation 2 console. Originally released in Japan in August 2005, the game was released in English in North America in February 2006, and is the first main series Grandia title to not be released in Europe. Grandia III was re-released on the North American PlayStation 3 store on July 21, 2016. The game was designed by much of the key staff of previous games in the series and includes many features seen in its predecessors, including the battle system. Music for the game was provided by series veteran Noriyuki Iwadare, and features the opening theme song "In the Sky" performed by Japanese pop/rock artist Miz.

The game is set in a fantasy world where humans fly in magic-powered aircraft. A boy named Yuki is determined to become a great pilot like his idol, the Sky Captain Schmidt. When he and his mother encounter a girl named Alfina who has the ability to communicate with the spiritual guardians of the world, they discover the secrets of the world's past and face an evil rogue guardian named Xorn. The game met with a generally positive response upon release, with critics praising the game's innovative battle system.

== Gameplay ==
The player controls Yuki and his companions through a fully 3D world, fighting their way through obstacles using a battle system in the same style as the other Grandia games, with some slight tweaks. Throughout the game Yuki enlists the aide of various characters and creatures called the Guardians to aid him on his journey. Rather than walking across a world map to travel between areas in this game, the player flies a plane, with further landing points becoming available as the story is progressed.

=== Combat ===
Battles are similar to those of the previous Grandia games. It uses the same basic combat system, where both time and distance play into the execution of actions.

Icons representing all characters and enemies on the field begin an encounter on a point on the dial depending on whether the enemy party or the player party was running away from the other prior to the encounter, and progress along the circle at their own rates. Once the icon reaches the Command point of the dial, the game pauses to allow the player (or computer, if the icon is an enemy's) to give that character a command. The icon then enters the red area of the gauge. Spells, skills and criticals progress more slowly during this period than combos. When the icon reaches the ACT point in the gauge, the command is carried out, and the icon is sent back to the start, where the cycle continues. Characters on the field have two standard attacks: combos and criticals. With combos, the character will swing/stab/shoot the enemy a number of times as per their weapon's use and any applicable skills. They do more damage overall than Criticals, whose purpose is to knock the position of an enemy on the Turn Dial backwards. If a character is hit by a Critical or other "cancel" attack while in the red area of the gauge, their attack is canceled entirely, which is one of the main strategies for boss battles in the game. If a combo is performed upon an airborne enemy, then a special Aerial attack is done. If an enemy is defeated with an Aerial Finish, the monster may drop more valuable items.

== Plot ==
=== Characters ===
The characters of Grandia III were designed by You Yoshinari. The game centers on Yuki, a 16-year-old boy who dreams of becoming an ace pilot like his idol, the legendary Sky Captain Schmidt. Together with his friend Rotts, he builds his own magic-powered aircraft in an attempt to fly over the ocean, but becomes sidetracked due to the intervention of his mother, Miranda. When Yuki and Miranda meet Alfina, a beautiful young girl with the ability to communicate with Sacred Beasts, the god-like guardians of the planet, they become involved in an adventure. During their journey, the party meets four other characters who become playable at certain points in the story: Alonso, a sailor who dreams of completing his map of the world; Ulf, a carefree demi-human boy who travels on a flying dragon; Dahna, a cynical cartomancer with a hidden soft side; and Hect, a sullen musician from a troubled village.

The unprincipled brother of Alfina, Emellious, can also communicate with the guardians, but abandoned his duties as a Communicator to seek the power of Xorn, a rogue guardian with the power of darkness, and become a god. Emellious is assisted in his endeavor by Kornell, a large, imposing man with an iron gauntlet; Violetta, who serves Emellious out of a desire for the sibling relationship he shares with Alfina; La-Ilim, a demonic creature who uses an artifact known as the Crystal Skull to summon undead beasts; and Grau, Emellious' right-hand man and conniving strategist. In order to combat their adversaries, the heroes must travel across the world to meet the Sacred Beasts, who consist of Gryph the eagle, Drak the dragon, Yoat the ram, Seiba the unicorn, and Unama the dolphin.

=== Story ===
Grandia III takes place in an unnamed world, consisting of a main continent surrounded by the Belion Sea. Only one person has flown the breadth of the Belion Sea, Sky Captain Schmidt. Yuki hails from the village Anfog, on Titalos Island. Much of the world relies on flying dragons or planes, which use a magical power source. The Guardians are mystical beasts which hail from the Verse Realm. They came to Yuki's world after a war broke out on their own, quieting wars in both worlds, and guiding the remaining people to safety. They then watched over the world, imparting wisdom to the people through a chosen line of "Communicators", who can understand the words of the Guardians.

Yuki, an aspiring pilot, has been building an airplane with his friend Rotts in hopes of being the second pilot to fly across the ocean, following in the footsteps of his idol, Schmidt. He keeps these plans a secret from his reckless mother, Miranda. Yuki and Rotts have completed their 19th model. On this flight, his mother stows away on his plane, and he is unable to stay airborne with the extra weight. As they lose altitude, Yuki sees a girl in a carriage being chased by several men and is immediately lovestruck. After crashing in the forest, he and Miranda fight to defend the girl. The girl introduces herself as Alfina, and says she must go to the temple at Arcriff to fulfill her role as a Communicator in the stead of her vanished brother, Emelious. Recognizing that Yuki is smitten, Miranda offers for them to escort her.

Needing a boat to reach the mainland, they find a sailor named Alonso trapped in a barrel at the pier. He offers to return their help in freeing them, claiming to be a ship captain. When they reach the harbor, however, Alonso steals Alfina's brooch, a cherished memento of Emelious, to use as collateral for gambling. He loses the brooch because the proprietor, Bianca, cheats using loaded dice. Wanting one more chance, he offers to marry Bianca if he loses again. Though Miranda and Yuki are furious at Alonso for his deception, they agree to help him counter Bianca's cheating in order to get Alfina's brooch back. Miranda flirts with Alonso during the game, distracting Bianca so that he can jar the dice mid-throw and win the game. With Alfina's brooch and Alonso's ship recovered, Alonso sails them across the sea. En route, a flock of birds attacks them, and they are saved by a dragon rider named Ulf. Ulf mentions having met Sky Captain Schmidt, who lives in Mendi City. Alfina consents to a stopover in Randoto to find a Lem Fruit, so that Yuki can meet his idol and perhaps get him to build a plane for their journey.

Alfina's fate becomes more twisted, as Alfina and her companions challenge Emelious and finally face Xorn.

The epilogue shows everyone going on living their lives. Yuki and Alfina are married with a son who has the same ambition of flying as his father.

== Development ==
Grandia III was first announced in a March 2005 issue of the Japanese Weekly Famitsu magazine, which revealed that Game Arts and Square Enix would be bringing the game to the PlayStation 2 console like the previous installment, Grandia Xtreme. The project was headed by director Hidenobu Takahashi, who previously served as art director for Grandia II, and stated that the game would follow the series' themes of "adventure, drama and dreams", and would continue in the direction of taking the series to a more "adult" sensibility while still retaining an overall optimistic tone. Character design for the game was provided by You Yoshinari with Takahiro Hasebe serving as scenario writer, both of whom had worked on the original Grandia. The CGI movie cutscenes were produced by Mikitaka Kurasawa, who had also worked with Capcom on Onimusha. According to a Square Enix representative, the amount of cutscenes in the game are roughly equal in length to three movies. Combat in Grandia III was designed to be a variation of the system seen in previous games in the series, and was described by Takahashi as being "very complex but very easy to learn", adding that "The combination of the story, fast-paced battle system and beautiful environment will prove to be an extremely enjoyable adventure." An official website was launched for the game in April 2005, which detailed the game's final release date the following August, as well as offered updates on the game's mechanics and characters.

The English version of Grandia III was announced in December 2005 in the form of a teaser website from Square Enix, which revealed that the game was scheduled for release in North America the following February. In January 2006, the game was given its final release date of February 14.

In July 2016, Grandia III was added to the PlayStation Store as a PlayStation 2 Classic game playable on PlayStation 3.

=== Audio ===
Voice actors
| Character | Japanese | English |
|---|---|---|
| Yuki | Masaya Matsukaze | Johnny Yong Bosch |
| Miranda | Mayumi Wakamura | Michelle Ruff |
| Alfina | Haruka Kinami | Stephanie Sheh |
| Alonso | Shingo Katsurayama | Bob Buchholz |
| Ulf | Takeru Shibaki | Brian Beacock |
| Dahna | Sayaka Yoshino | Jessica Straus |
| Hect | Ayaka Maeda | Rebecca Forstadt |
| Emelious | Takashi Hagino | Fleet Cooper |
| Kornell | Hoka Kinoshita | JB Blanc |
| Violetta | Kaori Sakagami | Wendee Lee |
| La-Ilim | Chafurin | Daran Norris |
| Grau | Ido Kawakami | Kim Strauss |
| Gryph | Chieko Baisho | Paula Tiso |
| Drak | Yukijiro Hotaru | Douglas Rye |
| Yoat | Shinmei Tsuji | Kim Strauss |
| Seiba | Yukijiro Hotaru | Douglas Rye |
| Xorn | Uncredited | Douglas Rye |
| Rotts | Toshinobu Matsuo | Doug Erholtz |
| Bianca | Kaoru Mizuki | Mona Marshall |

The music of Grandia III was composed by Noriyuki Iwadare, who contributed the soundtracks to all previous Grandia titles. Shortly after the Japanese version was released in August 2005, the Grandia III Original Soundtrack was released by Two-Five Records, featuring background themes from the game across two discs. Grandia III also features the theme song "In the Sky" performed by Japanese pop/rock singer Miz, which is featured in the game's opening demo, and was released as a single one day before the game in both regular and limited editions by Victor Entertainment. Players who pre-ordered the game in Japan could also receive a special promotional album featuring three songs from the game recorded live by the game's music staff, including the vocal theme "To the Moon" performed by Kaori Kawasumi. In September 2005, "Melk Ruins", a music track from the game that was unable to be included in the official soundtrack, was made available on the game's official Japanese website as a free download. The voice clips during battle and story scenes were provided by veteran anime and video game actors.

== Reception ==
Reception

Aggregate scores
| Aggregator | Score |
|---|---|
| GameRankings | 78.60% |
| Metacritic | 77/100 |

Review scores
| Publication | Score |
|---|---|
| 1Up.com | B+ |
| Eurogamer | 6/10 |
| Famitsu | 35/40 |
| Game Informer | 8.75/10 |
| GamePro | 4/5 |
| GameSpot | 7.6/10 |
| IGN | 7.6/10 |

Grandia III was met with a fairly positive response in Japan, debuting as the second highest-selling game of its week of release with 122,000 copies sold, and would go on to sell approximately 233,866 copies by the end of 2005. The game received a 35 out of 40 score from Weekly Famitsu Magazine, earning it an editor's choice Platinum distinction.

The game's reception in North America was generally positive. It received an aggregate score of 78.60% on GameRankings and 77/100 on Metacritic. Many publications praised the game's battle system, with Electronic Gaming Monthly stating that "Grandia's semi-real-time battles are superb, offering just the right balance of strategy and visual flair, and the new aerial combos are a blast," but found the game's plot to be "fairly linear". GamePro similarly called the game's combat "intriguing", yet deemed the game's story to be "more clichéd and campy than epic and amazing ... The characters all fall into conveniently familiar categories and fail to attract any serious interest in their concerns or circumstances" GameSpot found the game's short length and lack of sidequests to be its low points, yet ultimately declared that "While not as stuffed with features and extra content as some of the other RPGs currently available, Grandia III still delivers an interesting (if traditional) story, fun characters, and a versatile, strategy-based battle system." 1UP.com declared that the game's story, pacing, and character development felt disjointed from one disc to another, stating that "I almost feel like I'm reviewing two games -- the first disc, which is awesome, and the second, which is ho-hum." In an article for The New York Times, game critic Charles Herold called the game's battle system "arguably the greatest combat system of any turn-based role-playing game in existence" but found the rest of the game to be largely average, remarking that it "falls short of true greatness, not because it does anything glaringly wrong but because it doesn't do quite enough things right."

In an import review of the North American version, Eurogamer found the game to be a largely mediocre role-playing title, but wrote that its battle system was above-average, concluding that "the game is saved from total mediocrity by its superb battle system, but a fantastic battle system does not a brilliant game make." The website would additionally pan the game's J-pop opening theme, calling it "a disgustingly poor piece of aural pap", yet called the rest of the game's score "pleasant, though forgettable." Play conversely felt that the game was above-average, stating that "[Grandia III] does almost everything well, from the involving story and beautiful graphics to the compelling characters, and does one thing - the battle system - better than any other RPG we've seen. Grandia III was released on the North American PlayStation 3 store on July 21, 2016.
