= Noriyuki Iwadare =

Japanese composer

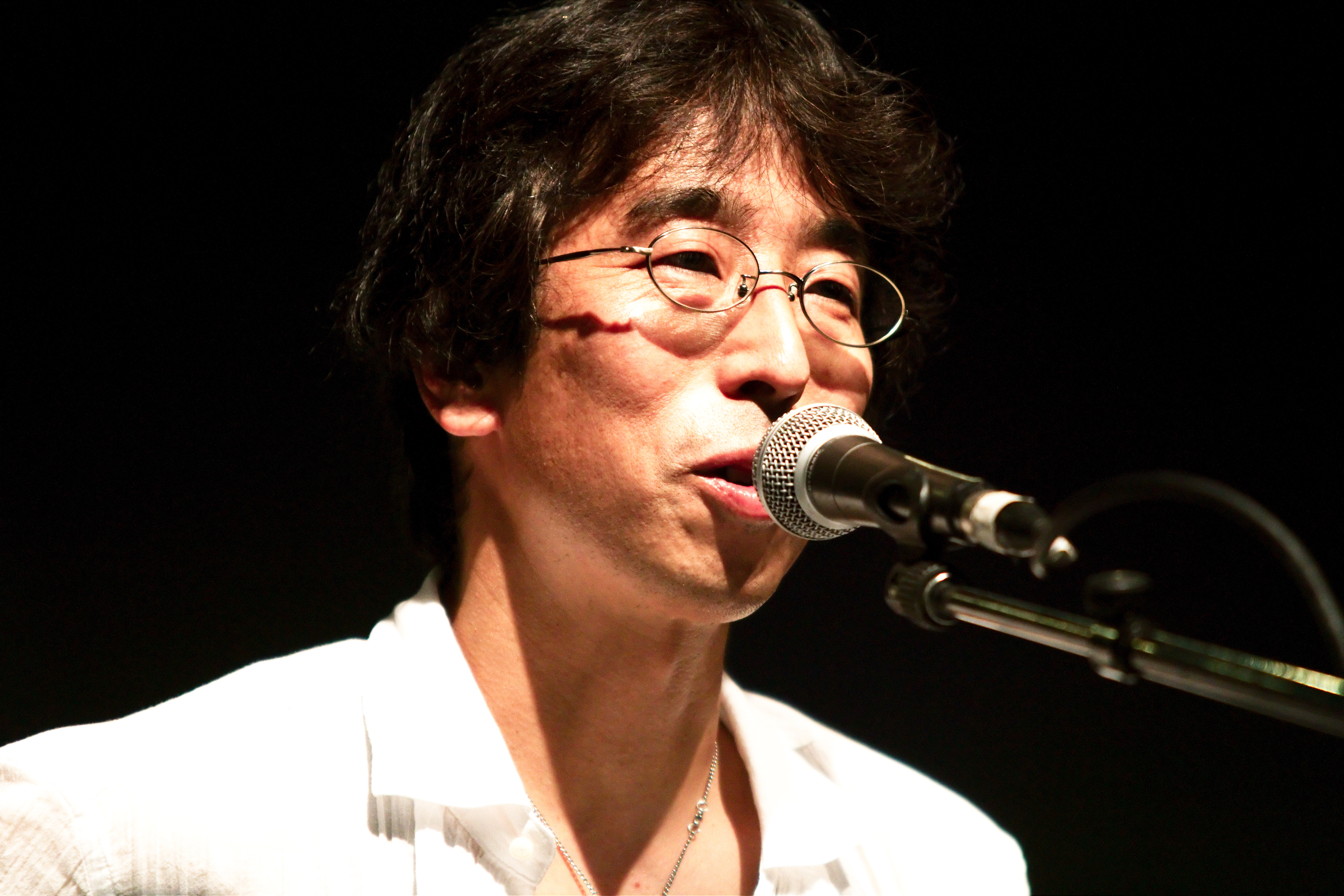
- Iwadare in 2010
- Born: April 28, 1964 (age 62); Matsumoto, Nagano, Japan
- Education: Shobi University
- Occupation: Composer
- Years active: 1990–present
- Musical career
- Instruments: Piano, guitar

Noriyuki Iwadare (岩垂 徳行, Iwadare Noriyuki; born on April 28, 1964) is a Japanese video game composer. Some of his work include the Langrisser, Lunar, Grandia, and Ace Attorney series.

== Biography ==
Iwadare was born in Matsumoto City, Nagano Prefecture, Japan. He began to compose video game music after years of being involved with university bands. He began composing for Toaplan, arranging their arcade video game soundtracks for their Sega Mega Drive home console ports, notably the Mega Drive version of Zero Wing (1990), before composing for other companies such as Game Arts on their Lunar and Grandia series.

The first award he won was the Best Game Music award, the Mega Drive/Genesis category for Lunar: The Silver Star in 1991. He also won the Best Game Music award in the Sega Saturn Music category for Grandia in 1997 and in the Dreamcast category for Grandia 2 in 2000. Iwadare first composed music for Tokyo Disney Resort, in addition to Japanese dance programs, television programs, and radio programs. He dreams to have orchestral arrangements of his musical works, which he himself has done several times, as with the Gyakuten Meets Orchestra arrangements (orchestral arrangements of the Ace Attorney series music).

He was a special guest at the 11th French Japan Expo that was held in July 2010 in Paris.

== Works ==
Year	Title	Role
1990	Space Invaders: Fukkatsu no Hi	
1990	Space Invaders '90	
1990	Zero Wing (Mega Drive)	Arrangements
1990	After Burner II (Mega Drive)	Arrangements
1991	Wings of Wor	
1991	Langrisser	with Hiroshi Fujioka and Isao Mizoguchi
1991	Blue Almanac	with several others
1991	Head Buster	with Hiroshi Fujioka and Isao Mizoguchi
1991	Parasol Stars	
1991	Ys III: Wanderers from Ys (Mega Drive)	Arrangements with Yoshiaki Kubodera
1992	Steel Empire	with Isao Mizoguchi and Yoshiaki Kubotera
1992	Sotsugyou: Graduation	
1992	Gley Lancer	with Masanori Hikichi, Yoshiaki Kubotera, and Isao Mizoguchi
1992	Lunar: The Silver Star	with Hiroshi Fujioka, Isao Mizoguchi, and Yoshiaki Kubotera
1993	Kishi Densetsu	with Isao Mizoguchi
1993	Maten no Soumetsu	with Isao Mizoguchi
1993	SimEarth (Sega CD)	
1993	Tanjou: Debut	
1993	Langrisser: Hikari no Matsuei	with several others
1993	Alien vs Predator: The Last of His Clan	
1994	Crusader of Centy	Sound programmer
1994	Urusei Yatsura: Dear My Friends (Mega-CD)	Arrangements
1994	Langrisser II	with Isao Mizoguchi
1994	Wing Commander (Sega CD)	with Isao Mizoguchi, Kenichi Okuma, Maki Tanimoto
1994	Lunar: Eternal Blue	
1994	Sotsugyou II: Neo Generation	with Maki Tanimoto, Kenichi Okuma, Isao Mizoguchi
1994	Mighty Morphin Power Rangers: The Movie (Game Boy)	with Kenichi Okuma
1994	Mercurius Pretty	
1995	Der Langrisser	
1995	Dōkyūsei	"Opening Theme"
1996	Lunar: Walking School	
1996	Monstania	
1996	Tanjou S	
1996	Lunar: Silver Star Story	
1996	Doukyuusei if	"Opening Theme"
1996	True Love Story	with Kenichi Okuma, Maki Tanimoto, Ataru Sumiyoshi
1997	Doukyuusei 2 (Sega Saturn)	"Opening Theme"
1997	Langrisser IV	with Makoto Asai, Yuichiro Honda
1997	Magic School Lunar!	
1997	Grandia	
1998	Langrisser V: The End of Legend	
1998	Lunar 2: Eternal Blue	
1999	True Love Story 2	
1999	Yuukyuu no Eden	
1999	Growlanser	
2000	Grandia II	
2000	Mercurius Pretty: End of the Century	
2001	True Love Story 3	
2002	Grandia Xtreme	
2002	Wind: A Breath of Heart	with Maki Tanimoto
2003	True Love Story: Summer Days, and Yet…	
2003	Mega Man X7	"Higher The Air ~ Air Force Stage"
2004	Phoenix Wright: Ace Attorney – Trials and Tribulations	
2005	Radiata Stories	
2006	Grandia III	
2006	KimiKiss	
2006	Project Wiki	
2006	Kanji no Wataridori	
2007	Elvandia Story	with Norihiko Hibino
2007	KimiKiss: Pure Rouge	with Hikaru Nanase and Masaru Yokoyama
2008	Super Smash Bros. Brawl	Arrangements (Note: "Yoshi's Island", "Meta Knight's Revenge", "With Mila's Divine Protection (Celica Map 1)")
2008	True Fortune	
2009	Amagami	
2009	Ace Attorney Investigations: Miles Edgeworth	with Yasuko Yamada
2009	Lunar: Silver Star Harmony	
2010	Grandia Online	
2011	Ace Attorney Investigations 2: Prosecutor's Gambit	
2011	Otomedius Excellent	with several others
2012	Kid Icarus: Uprising	with several others
2013	Phoenix Wright: Ace Attorney - Dual Destinies	
2014	Super Smash Bros. for Nintendo 3DS and Wii U	Arrangements (Note: "Gear Getaway", "In the Space-Pirate Ship", "Air Man Stage")
2015	Langrisser Re:Incarnation Tensei	
2015	Zombie Tokyo	with Michiko Naruke
2016	Phoenix Wright: Ace Attorney − Spirit of Justice	with Toshihiko Horiyama and Masami Onodera
2016	Reco Love: Blue Ocean and Gold Beach	
2018	Super Smash Bros. Ultimate	Arrangements (Note: "City Trial", "Delfino Plaza", "Top Man Stage", "Light Plane", "Electroplankton", "Kurikinton (Fatal Fury 2)", "Stormy Saxophone 2 (The King of Fighters '96)")
2019	Rakugaki Kingdom	"Spiral Power Bomb"
2020	Ninjala	with several others
2023	Loop8: Summer of Gods	
2024	Project MBR	
2025	Kirby Air Riders	with Shogo Sakai
