= Game Arts =

Japanese video game developer and publisher

Game Arts Co., Ltd.
- Native name: 株式会社ゲームアーツ
- Romanized name: Kabushiki gaisha gēmu ātsu
- Type: Public
- Industry: Video games
- Founded: March 2, 1985; 41 years ago
- Founder: Takeshi Miyaji; Yoichi Miyaji
- Headquarters: Chiyoda, Tokyo, Japan
- Key people: Kazuki Morishita (president & CEO)
- Products: Thexder series Silpheed series Alisia Dragoon; Lunar series Gungriffon series Grandia series Super Smash Bros. Brawl
- Revenue: ¥4.56 billion (2007)
- Number of employees: 23
- Parent: GungHo Online Entertainment
- Website: www.gamearts.co.jp

Game Arts Co., Ltd. (株式会社ゲームアーツ, Kabushiki gaisha gēmu ātsu) is a Japanese video game developer and publisher based in Chiyoda, Tokyo. Originally established in 1985 as a computer software company, it expanded into producing for a number of game console and handheld systems. Its President and CEO in 2005 was Yoichi Miyaji at which time it was a member of the Computer Entertainment Supplier's Association of Japan (CESA). Its major trading partners then included Square Enix, Bandai Namco, Koei Tecmo, and GungHo Online Entertainment, some of whom co-developed or produced games in cooperation with the company. In 2005, GungHo Online Entertainment had acquired the company.

The company has produced a number of games for several genres, beginning with the action game Thexder for personal computers in 1985. A number of traditional and Mahjong-related games have also been produced for Japanese audiences. In the Western world, Game Arts is best known as the producers of the Lunar and Grandia series of role-playing video games, as well as the Gungriffon line of vehicle simulation games. Some of its staff has helped in the preliminary development of Nintendo's Wii title Super Smash Bros. Brawl.

On April 22, 2009, Game Arts released the PlayStation port of Grandia in Japan on the PlayStation Network as a downloadable title in the PSone Classics range, to celebrate an upcoming announcement for Grandia Online.

== Games developed ==
Title	Platform	Publisher	Release date
Thexder	MSX, PC-88	Game Arts (Japan); Sierra Entertainment (US)	1985 (Japan); 1987 (US)
Cuby Panic	PC-88	Game Arts	April 1985 (Japan)
Thexder	NES	SquareSoft	December 18, 1985 (Japan)
Silpheed	PC-88	Game Arts (Japan); Sierra Entertainment (US)	1986 (Japan); 1988 (US) October 27, 2022 (Sega Mini 2 Console)
Zeliard	PC-88	Game Arts (Japan); Sierra Entertainment (US)	1987 (Japan); 1990 (US)
Solitaire Royale	MSX2, PC-88	Game Arts	June 3, 1988 (Japan)
Fire Hawk: Thexder – The Second Contact	MSX2, PC-88	Game Arts (Japan); Sierra Entertainment (US)	1989 (Japan); 1990 (US)
Faria: A World of Mystery and Danger	NES	Hi-Score Media Work (Japan); Nexoft (US)	July 21, 1989 (Japan); 1990 (US)
Harakiri	PC-88	Game Arts	July 20, 1990 (Japan)
Gyuwamburaa (Gambler) Jiko Chuushinha	Sega Mega Drive/Genesis	Game Arts	December 14, 1990 (Japan)
Tenka Fubu	Sega Mega-CD	Game Arts	December 28, 1991 (Japan)
Alisia Dragoon	Sega Mega Drive/Genesis	Game Arts (Japan); Sega (US & Europe)	April 24, 1992 (Japan); April 23, 1992 (US); 1992 (Europe)
Lunar: The Silver Star	Sega Mega-CD	Game Arts (Japan); Working Designs (US)	June 26, 1992 (Japan); December 1993 (US)
Gyuwamburaa (Gambler) Jiko Chuushinha 2	Sega Mega-CD	Game Arts	December 18, 1992 (Japan)
Wonder MIDI	Wondermega	Victor	December 25, 1992 (Japan)
Yumimi Mix	Sega Mega-CD	Game Arts	January 29, 1993 (Japan)
J-League Champion Soccer	Sega Mega Drive/Genesis	Shogakukan	February 26, 1993 (Japan)
Silpheed	Sega Mega-CD	Game Arts (Japan); Sega (US & Europe)	July 30, 1993 (Japan); 1993 (US); 1993 (Europe)
Jan'ou Touryumon	Sega Mega Drive/Genesis	Sega	November 5, 1993 (Japan)
Urusei Yatsura: My Dear Friends	Sega Mega-CD	Game Arts	April 15, 1994 (Japan)
Lunar: Eternal Blue	Sega Mega-CD	Game Arts (Japan); Working Designs (US)	December 21, 1994 (Japan); September 1995 (US)
Thexder 95	PC	Game Arts (Japan); Sierra Entertainment (US)	1995 (Japan); 1995 (US)
Yumimi Mix Remix	Sega Saturn	Game Arts	July 28, 1995 (Japan)
Lunar: Samposuru Gakuen (co-developed with Ehrgeiz)	Game Gear	Game Arts	January 12, 1996 (Japan)
Gungriffon: The Eurasian Conflict (Japan); Gungriffon (US & Europe)	Sega Saturn	Game Arts (Japan); Sega (US & Europe)	March 15, 1996 (Japan); 1996 (US); 1996 (Europe); March 12, 1998 (Japan) (Saturn Collection)
Lunar: Silver Star Story (co-developed with Japan Art Media)	Sega Saturn	Kadokawa Games	October 1996 (Japan)
Tokyo Mahjong Land	Sega Saturn	Game Arts	October 18, 1996 (Japan)
Daina Airan	Sega Saturn	Game Arts	December 27, 1996 (Japan) (Advanced Release); February 14, 1997 (Japan)
Lunar: Silver Star Story Complete (with "MPEG" card) (co-developed with Japan Art Media and Kadokawa Games)	Sega Saturn	Entertainment Software Publishing	July 1997 (Japan)
Mahō Gakuen Lunar! (co-developed with Kadokawa Games)	Sega Saturn	Entertainment Software Publishing	October 1997 (Japan)
Grandia	Sega Saturn	Entertainment Software Publishing	December 18, 1997 (Japan); November 26, 1998 (Japan) (Memorial Package)
Gungriffon II	Sega Saturn	Entertainment Software Publishing	April 23, 1998 (Japan)
Lunar: Silver Star Story Complete (co-developed with Japan Art Media and Kadokawa Games)	PlayStation	Entertainment Software Publishing (Japan); Working Designs (US)	May 28, 1998 (Japan); April 28, 1999 (Japan) (PlayStation the Best); April 30, 1999 (US); June 1, 1999 (US) (Fan Art Edition); February 6, 2002 (US) (Limited Re-Release)
Grandia: Digital Museum	Sega Saturn	Entertainment Software Publishing	May 28, 1998 (Japan)
Lunar 2: Eternal Blue (co-developed with Japan Art Media and Kadokawa Games)	Sega Saturn	Entertainment Software Publishing	July 1998 (Japan)
Lunar: Silver Star Story Complete (co-developed with Japan Art Media and Kadokawa Games)	PC	Entertainment Software Publishing	1998 (Japan); 1999 (Korea)
Lunar 2: Eternal Blue Complete (co-developed with Japan Art Media and Kadokawa Games)	PlayStation	Entertainment Software Publishing (Japan); Working Designs (US)	May 27, 1999 (Japan); September 7, 2000 (Japan) (Kakukawa Best); December 15, 2000 (US)
Grandia	PlayStation	Entertainment Software Publishing (Japan); Sony Computer Entertainment (US); Ubisoft (Europe)	June 24, 1999 (Japan); September 30, 1999 (US); March 30, 2000 (Europe); July 27, 2000 (Japan) (PlayStation the Best)
Gyuwamburaa (Gambler) Jiko Chuushinha: Tokyo Mahjong Land	PlayStation	Entertainment Software Publishing	June 22, 2000 (Japan)
Grandia II	Dreamcast	Entertainment Software Publishing (Japan); Ubisoft (US & Europe)	August 3, 2000 (Japan); December 6, 2000 (US); February 23, 2001 (Europe); May 23, 2002 (Japan) (DriKore)
Gungriffon Blaze	PlayStation 2	Capcom (Japan); Working Designs (US); Swing! Entertainment (Europe)	August 10, 2000 (Japan); October 24, 2000 (US); July 12, 2002 (Europe); August 1, 2002 (Japan) (PlayStation 2 the Best)
Silpheed: The Lost Planet (co-developed with Treasure and Tomy)	PlayStation 2	Capcom (Japan); Working Designs (US); Swing! Entertainment (Europe)	September 21, 2000 (Japan); April 23, 2001 (US); May 11, 2001 (Europe); July 19, 2002 (Europe) (Re-Release)
Grandia: Parallel Trippers (co-developed with Hudson Soft)	Game Boy Color	Entertainment Software Publishing	December 22, 2000 (Japan)
Lunar Legend (co-developed with Japan Art Media)	Game Boy Advance	Media Rings (Japan); Ubisoft (US)	April 12, 2001 (Japan); December 10, 2001 (US)
Chenwen no Sangokushi	PlayStation 2	Entertainment Software Publishing	November 1, 2001 (Japan)
Grandia II (port by Rocket Studio)	PlayStation 2	Enix Corporation (Japan); Ubisoft (US & Europe)	February 21, 2002 (Japan); January 28, 2002 (US); March 28, 2002 (Europe)
Grandia Xtreme	PlayStation 2	Enix Corporation	January 31, 2002 (Japan); September 30, 2002 (US)
Grandia II (port by Rocket Studio)	PC	Ubisoft	March 10, 2002 (US); April 12, 2002 (Europe)
Bomberman Generation	GameCube	Majesco (US); Hudson Soft (Japan); Vivendi Universal Games (Europe)	June 3, 2002 (North America); June 27, 2002 (Japan); December 6, 2002 (Europe)
Gungriffon: Allied Strike (co-developed with Kama Digital)	Xbox	Tecmo	December 16, 2004 (Japan); December 14, 2004 (US); April 8, 2005 (Europe)
Lunar Genesis (Japan & Europe); Lunar: Dragon Song (US) (co-developed with Japan Art Media and Rising Star Games)	Nintendo DS	Marvelous Entertainment (Japan); Ubisoft (US); Atari (Europe)	August 25, 2005 (Japan); September 27, 2005 (US); February 17, 2006 (Europe)
Grandia III	PlayStation 2	Square Enix	August 4, 2005 (Japan); February 14, 2006 (US)
Project Sylpheed (Japan) (co-developed with Square Enix and Seta Corporation)	Xbox 360	Square Enix (Japan) Microsoft Game Studios (US/EU)	September 28, 2006 (Japan); June 29, 2007 (Europe); July 10, 2007 (US)
Super Smash Bros. Brawl (co-developed with Sora Ltd., Nintendo, and other companies)	Wii	Nintendo	January 31, 2008 (Japan); March 9, 2008 (US); June 27, 2008 (Europe)
Grandia (co-developed with Entertainment Software Publishing)	PlayStation 3	D3Publisher (Japan); Sony Computer Entertainment (US)	April 22, 2009 (Japan); February 25, 2010 (US)
Teenage Mutant Ninja Turtles: Smash-Up	Wii, PlayStation 2	Ubisoft	September 22, 2009 (US); September 25, 2009 (Europe)
The Magic Obelisk	Wii	GungHo Online Entertainment	October 27, 2009 (Japan); December 28, 2009 (US)
Lunar: Silver Star Harmony	PSP, PlayStation Network	GungHo Online Entertainment (Japan); XSEED Games (US)	November 12, 2009 (Japan); March 2, 2010 (US)
Ragnarok Odyssey	PS Vita, PlayStation Network	GungHo Online Entertainment (Japan); XSEED Games (US)	February 2, 2012 (Japan); September 11, 2012 (US); February 20, 2013 (Europe)
Dokuro	PS Vita, PlayStation Network	GungHo Online Entertainment	July 5, 2012 (Japan); October 15, 2012 (US); January 30, 2013 (Europe)
Grandia II HD Remaster	Windows	GungHo Online Entertainment	August 24, 2015
Grandia HD Collection	Switch	GungHo Online Entertainment (US); Square Enix	August 16, 2019 (US) March 20, 2020 (Japan) October 1, 2021 (Asia)
Grandia HD Remaster	Windows	GungHo Online Entertainment	October 15, 2019
