= Cho Aniki =

Cho Aniki (超兄貴, Chō Aniki; lit. "Super Big Brother") is a Japanese video game series originally developed by Masaya and published by NCS Corp. The first game was released in 1992 for the PC Engine system. The game's sequels and spin-offs later appeared on the Super Famicom, PlayStation, Sega Saturn, WonderSwan, PlayStation 2 and PlayStation Portable. Mainly consisting of side-scrolling shoot 'em ups in the vein of Gradius, the Cho Aniki series is best known for its homoerotic overtones, wacky humor and vivid, surreal imagery. Most of the games have never seen release outside Japan.

For various reasons, the popularity of the Cho Aniki games has endured since the series' debut. Highlights of the various games include in-game music, innovative control schemes, or sheer kitsch value. In Japan, these games are examples of baka-ge, which literally means "idiot game" whose appeal lies in its campiness.

The rights to the series are currently owned by Extreme Co., Ltd., which had obtained the rights of NCS Corp. and Masaya products and trademarks.

== Video games ==
=== Cho Aniki ===
Cho Aniki is the first game in the Cho Aniki series.

=== Ai Cho Aniki ===
Ai Cho Aniki
- Developer: Masaya
- Publishers: JP: Nippon Computer Systems; JP: Hudson Soft (Virtual Console)
- Composer: Taku Iwasaki
- Platforms: Super CD-ROM², Wii (Virtual Console)
- Release: Super CD-ROM²: JP: February 24, 1995; Wii Virtual Console: JP: December 18, 2007
- Genre: Horizontal scrolling shooter
- Mode: Multiplayer

Ai Cho Aniki (愛・超兄貴, Ai Chō Aniki; lit. "Love Super Big Brother") was the sequel to Cho Aniki developed by Masaya and also released for the Super CD-ROM². In this game, players control Samson and Adon directly. A key difference in the control scheme of Ai Cho Aniki is that instead of rapidly pressing buttons as a means of firing at enemies, players now had to input intricate button combinations, Street Fighter-style. By and large, Cho Aniki and Ai Cho Aniki play very similarly.

In this game, Bo Empress Conscious (Bo Tei Conscious, a pun for "body-conscious") raises the Neo Builder Army to fight Idaten and Benten. However, the two fall in love and elope. This leaves Samson and Adon to fight the new threat, Su Emperor Roid (SuTeiRoid, a pun on "steroid"). This time Taku Iwasaki scored the soundtrack.

On release, Famicom Tsūshin scored the PC Engine version of the game a 24 out of 40, giving it a 7 out of 10 in their Reader Cross Review.

The game was released on Nintendo's Virtual Console service in 2007 in Japan.

=== Cho Aniki Bakuretsu Ranto-hen ===
Chō Aniki Bakuretsu Ranto Hen
- Developer: Masaya
- Publisher: Nippon Computer Systems
- Platform: Super Famicom
- Release: JP: September 22, 1995
- Genre: Fighting
- Mode: Multiplayer

Cho Aniki: Bakuretsu Ranto-hen (超兄貴 爆烈乱闘篇, Chō Aniki: Bakuretsu Rantō-hen; lit. "Super Big Brother: Exploding Brawl") is a departure from the typical Cho Aniki formula has characters from previous games — heroes and villains alike — battling in one-on-one fights. Playable characters include the following:

- Idaten, a warrior with long spiked hair who uses a variety of attacks with his body.
- Benten, who in this game is flanked by two cherubs who can transform into mini-hunks.
- Samson/Adon, attacks by gyrating and flatulating.
- Sabu, a pagoda-shaped ship with an Elvis Presley-looking figurehead.
- Mami 19, a strange amalgam of a cute girl and a battleship transporting three naked, frolicking men.
- Adam, a naked man riding in half a moon. He is intended to resemble Adam from The Creation of Adam portion of Michelangelo's Sistine Chapel.
- Botei, a berserker, likely to be Bo Emperor (Botei) Bill from the first series
- Uminin, an odd latex creature that resembles a condom.

This game was the last of the series to be developed by Masaya. It was released in 1995.

=== Cho Aniki: Kyuukyoku Muteki Ginga Saikyou Otoko ===
Cho Aniki: Kyuukyoku Muteki Ginga Saikyou Otoko
- Developer: Pre-Stage
- Publishers: JP: Masaya; JP: Extreme
- Platforms: PlayStation, Sega Saturn
- Release: PlayStation: JP: December 29, 1995; JP: August 30, 2001 (reprint); Sega Saturn: JP: March 29, 1996
- Genre: Horizontal scrolling shooter
- Mode: Single-player

Cho Aniki - Kyuukyoku Muteki Ginga Saikyou Otoko (超兄貴 ～究極無敵銀河最強男～, Chō Aniki - Kyūkyoku Muteki Ginga Saikyō Otoko; lit. "Super Big Brother - The Ultimate, Most Powerful Man in the Milky Way") was released for the PlayStation the same year as the previous two titles. This game features digitized sprites instead of the hand-drawn anime-style art from the other titles. It was released for the Sega Saturn three months later. The subtitle of this game loosely translates to "The Ultimate, Most Strongest Man in the Milky Way" or "The Ultimate, Invincible, Most Galactically Powerful Man." The game is based on the engine of the first Cho Aniki. Idaten and Benten are again the main two characters. Koji Hayama returned to score a few songs for the soundtrack, along with Don McCow, Taku Iwasaki, and Sanae Kasahara.

=== Cho Aniki: Otoko no Tamafuda ===
Cho Aniki: Otoko no Tamafuda
- Developer: Masaya
- Publisher: Bandai
- Platform: Wonderswan
- Release: JP: February 10, 2000
- Genre: RPG
- Mode: Single-player

Cho Aniki: Otoko no Tamafuda (超兄貴 男の魂札, Chō Aniki: Otoko no Tamafuda; lit. "Super Big Brother: Spirit Man Tag") is a video game in the Cho Aniki series. This twist on the Cho Aniki universe pits the heroes of the previous games on a role-playing video game quest in which battles are fought with playing cards. According to an article on the game on the Hardcore Gaming 101 website, the title of the game is a pun. The title translates to "Man's Tamafuda," with tamafuda being a portmanteau of tamashii — Japanese for "soul" — and hanafuda — a Japanese card game. It is also likely that the pun extends to another meaning of tama, "balls".

The game was released for the portable WonderSwan system in 2000.

=== i (Ai) Chō Aniki: Gekiretsu Nawatobi-hen ===
i (Ai) Chō Aniki: Gekiretsu Nawatobi-hen
- Developer: Masaya
- Publisher: Masaya
- Platform: Mobile Phone
- Release: JP: 2001
- Genre: Sport
- Mode: Single-player

i (Ai) Chō Aniki: Gekiretsu Nawatobi-hen (i（愛）・超兄貴『激烈縄跳び編』, i Chō Aniki Gekiretsu Nawatobi-hen; lit. "Love Super Big Brother: Violence Jump Rope Chapter") is the first Cho Aniki game released for Japanese mobile phones. The lowercase i is a reference to the i-mode Japanese cellphone provider.

=== Cho Aniki: Seinaru Protein Densetsu ===
Cho Aniki: Seinaru Protein Densetsu
- Developers: X-nauts; Psikyo
- Publisher: Global A
- Platform: PlayStation 2
- Release: JP: October 30, 2003
- Genre: Horizontal scrolling shooter
- Mode: Single-player

Cho Aniki: Seinaru Protein Densetsu (超兄貴～聖なるプロテイン伝説～, Chō aniki: Seinaru Purotein Densetsu; lit. "Super Big Brother: Legend of the Holy Protein"). It was released for the PlayStation 2 in 2003. With Masaya now defunct, the game was co-developed by X-Nauts and Psikyo. This team also developed Sengoku Blade, and this game plays much like it as a result.

The plot of this game centers on the Holy Protein, a godlike glob of what may be semen. Samson and Adon hover around the glob, absorbing enemy fire as they did in previous games. This game lacks playable characters from previous titles, such as Benten, who only appears in some illustrations shown when the stage is completed. Some of the enemies include a giant, cross-dressing man in an Alice in Wonderland costume and a Mona Lisa painting that fires lasers from its eyes.

=== Cho Aniki Zero ===
This is the first Cho Aniki title developed by Extreme Co., Ltd., which had obtained the rights of NCS Corp. and Masaya products.

=== Chō Aniki: Kan's (Menzu) Bouringu!! ===
Chō Aniki: Kan's (Menzu) Bouringu!!
- Developer: Masaya
- Publisher: Masaya
- Platform: Mobile Phone
- Release: JP: 2011
- Genre: Bowling
- Mode: Single-player

Chō Aniki: Kan's (Menzu) Bouringu!! (超兄貴〜漢’s（メンズ）ボウリング!!〜, Chō aniki: Kan’ s (menzu) Bōringu!!; lit. "Super Big Brother: Hans Bowling") is the second Cho Aniki game released for Japanese mobile phones.

=== Cho Aniki Dance ===
Cho Aniki Dance (ダンシング・オブ・超兄貴, Danshingu Obu Chō aniki; lit. "The Dance of Super Big Brother") is an upcoming rhythm game that was scheduled for October 2021 in Japan, it is the third Cho Aniki game released for Japanese mobile phones.

== Music ==
The first game was composed entirely by Koji Hayama, who states on his website that Cho Aniki is his favorite work to date. Numerous soundtracks from the various games have been released on CD, maxi-singles, and even a live performance has been released on VHS. Later games in the series were composed by Taku Iwasaki, Isao Mizoguchi (under the alias Don McCow) and Sanae Kasahara.

== Cho Aniki in pop culture ==
=== Appearances in other games ===
Masaya also developed the Langrisser series, where Samson and company make a cameo. A hidden level takes the party to an area called the Muscle Shrine, where they must fight Samson. If victorious, the party can then use the Aniki summon, the most powerful summon in the game. The cameo exists in the Mega Drive, Super NES, and PlayStation ports of the game.

The Capcom video game, God Hand, pokes fun of Samson and Adon as powerless yet flamboyant drag queens who are the first boss of the game.

Though technically not part of the series, the Sega Genesis shoot 'em up Wings of Wor (known as Gynoug in Japan and Europe) was also developed by Masaya and published by NCS, and features gameplay and surreal designs similar to the first Cho Aniki game.

The Japanese release of the Game Boy Advance game Gem Smashers replaces the three playable characters with three differently colored versions of the Uminin (the original light blue Uminin, and a pink and green Uminin as well).

=== Cult popularity ===
Few outside Japan have played the Cho Aniki series, but many know of the game through articles written about it on such websites as I-Mockery, Seanbaby, and Something Awful. The series is often mentioned in lists of outrageous, peculiar or sexual video games.

Sometime around 1999, gaming magazine Electronic Gaming Monthly ran a passing comment about how the US was thankfully spared this homoerotic shooter (Referring to Cho Aniki for PS1, although the comment was followed by "Not that there is nothing wrong with a homosexual shooter"). For the next few months, EGM's letters to the editor were dominated by remarks lambasting the editors at EGM for making fun of the game, even after the editors repeatedly told their readership that the game was horrible.

== See also ==
- Kuso
- List of video games with LGBT characters
- Homoeroticism
