= Dokuro (video game) =

2012 video game

- Japanese PlayStation Vita box art
- Developer: Game Arts
- Publisher: GungHo Online Entertainment
- Platforms: PlayStation Vita, iOS, Android, Microsoft Windows, Nintendo Switch
- Release: July 5, 2012: PS Vita; JP: July 5, 2012; USA: October 16, 2012; CAN: November 6, 2012; PAL: January 30, 2013 iOS; WW: June 30, 2013; JP: December 5, 2013 Android December 5, 2013 Windows December 8, 2014 Switch September 27, 2018
- Genre: Puzzle
- Mode: Single-player

Dokuro is a video game developed by Game Arts and published by GungHo Online Entertainment originally for the PlayStation Vita with later ports to iOS, Android, Microsoft Windows and Nintendo Switch. The player controls Dokuro, who must save a princess after the Dark Lord wants to marry her.

== Gameplay ==
The player is Dokuro, a skeletal worker for the Dark Lord. One day, the Dark Lord captures a princess and forces her to marry him. Dokuro sees the princess crying which breaks his heart and he thus decides to help her escape the Dark Lord's castle. Dokuro can flip switches to open up paths, carry the princess after drinking a potion, as well as others. The game's levels grow steadily more complex as the game progresses.

== Development ==
The game uses a graphical style that imitates artwork in a children's storybook. The game's director, Noriaki Kazama, previously worked on gory video games such as Ninja Gaiden Sigma under Team Ninja. Kazama said that after he had a baby, he browsed through children's books at the bookstore and was inspired by the art style.

== Reception ==
Reception

Aggregate score
Aggregator	Score
Metacritic	(iOS) 80/100 (Vita) 76/100 (Switch) 60/100 (PC) 59/100

Review scores
Publication	Score
1Up.com	(Vita) B
Destructoid	(Vita) 7/10
Famitsu	(Vita) 34/40
Game Informer	(Vita) 6/10
GameRevolution	(PC) 5/10
GameZone	(Vita) 9/10
Hardcore Gamer	(Vita) 4.5/5
IGN	(Vita) 8.8/10
Joystiq	(Vita) 4/5
Pocket Gamer	(iOS) 4/5 (Vita) 3.5/5
PlayStation: The Official Magazine	(Vita) 8/10
Push Square	(Vita) 8/10
TouchArcade	(iOS) 3.5/5
411Mania	(PC) 5.5/10
The Digital Fix	(Vita) 7/10

The PlayStation Vita and iOS versions received "generally favorable reviews", while the PC and Switch versions received "mixed" reviews, according to the review aggregation website Metacritic. In Japan, Famitsu gave the Vita version a score of 34 out of 40.

IGN said of the PlayStation Vita version, "Stunningly beautiful and exceptionally fun to play, Dokuro belongs in the library of every PlayStation Vita owner." Joystiq claimed that "Despite the bony exterior, Dokuro feels like it has a real soul, like it was made by people who truly loved and believed in it. It's inspired, well-made, and thoroughly enchanting." Game Informer, however, gave the same Vita version a mixed review, stating, "Between its unforgiving nature, unbalanced difficulty, and humdrum puzzles, I wouldn't have pressed on through Dokuro if I wasn't reviewing it. Rarely did I feel that fun "a-ha" moment that makes puzzle games exciting; instead I found tedium and frustration. I surely wasn't as devoted to this game as Dokuro was to the princess."
