= Zeliard =

1987 video game

- Developer: Game Arts
- Publishers: Game Arts; Sierra On-Line (NA, EU)
- Composers: Fumihito Kasatani; Nobuyuki Aoshima
- Platforms: PC-88, X1, MS-DOS
- Release: PC-88: JP: December 19, 1987; X1: JP: May 13, 1988; MS-DOS: NA: 1990; EU: 1990
- Genres: Platform, role-playing
- Mode: Single-player

Zeliard (ゼリアード, Zeriādo) is a 1987 role playing platform game developed for the PC-88 and published by Game Arts in 1987 in Japan. Sierra On-Line struck a deal with Game Arts and had the game re-published for Europe and North America for MS-DOS compatible operating systems in 1990. In Zeliard, the player controls the knight Duke Garland, whose task is to save the Kingdom of Zeliard by destroying the evil overlord Jashiin, and recovering the Nine Tears of Esmesanti, magic jewels.

== Plot ==
An ancient demon named Jashiin, self-dubbed as the Emperor of Chaos, emerges from a two-thousand-year-old sleep to unleash his wrath upon the Kingdom of Zeliard, justifying his actions as a revenge upon the ancient kings of Zeliard. Jashiin causes it to rain sand for 115 days, turning the kingdom into desert, and turns King Felishika's only daughter, the beautiful princess Felicia, into stone, in the process stealing from her the Nine Tears of Esmesanti.

The protagonist and player-controlled character, Duke Garland, is sent by the spirits to aid Zeliard and save Felicia. Duke Garland must recover the Nine Tears of Esmesanti, for only these can reverse the stone curse. Subsequently, Duke Garland must also slay Jashiin.

Garland may find safe haven in various cities and outposts not yet conquered by Jashiin, where he can rest in Inns and purchase weaponry and equipment.

== Gameplay ==
Zeliard is a role playing platform game. The gameplay is divided into sections—in-town, and in-labyrinth. To complete the game, the player must pass through eight increasingly complex labyrinths, swarming with Jashiin's underlings. At the end of each Labyrinth, a boss dwells, holding one of the nine Tears; the final Tear is held by Jashiin himself.

No combat takes place in towns, with the exception of an optional boss in a building in the town with the fire caverns. Towns usually exist on the borders of different labyrinths, although some are located in the middle, and one village is hidden. When in town, Garland can make use of banks, shops, sages and resting areas, provided he has adequate gold. Garland may also talk to the townsfolk in hope of getting useful information for his quest.

The labyrinths are the combat space of the game. When in a labyrinth, Garland will have to make good use of his sword, shield, special items, and magic spells, in order to slay countless creatures, and progress to the next boss or town. The labyrinth area is divided into eight different sections, each with a unique appearance and containing unique monsters, and each having a different boss monster, guarding one of the Tears of Esmesanti jewels. Some labyrinth even contain invisible walls, which need to be crossed using the monsters (like the dogs in level 8) that one also needs to fight.

Regular monsters inhabit each labyrinth, respawning each time Garland enters. When a monster is killed, it may drop an alma. Almas can be exchanged at banks for gold or with some NPCs for a quest item.

Garland can die by taking excessive damage from close contact with monsters, their projectiles, or the natural environment such as hidden spikes or excessive temperatures. When dying, Garland will lose all his carried gold and half his carried almas, and be teleported back to the very first town in the game, having to go back to where he was before dying (which is usually easier than going there the first time, since the boss monsters are already dead, all the closed doors remain open, and special items acquired later in the game may be of use for quicker progression).

== Reception ==
Reception

Review score
Publication	Score
The Games Machine	81%

The game was well received by critics in both Europe and in America. Planetstation Magazine in their retrospective on Game Arts called the game a classic imbued with personality and recommended the game if they can accept the game's harsh difficulty, but described the gameplay as repetitive.

In 2017, PC Gamer magazine listed the European release as having one of the worst box covers of all time, saying that it is inferior to the original box art's anime art style.
