= Thexder =

1985 video game

- Developers: Game Arts: Game Arts; Bits Laboratory (Famicom); Compile (MSX); Synergistic Software (Apple II)
- Publishers: Game Arts: Game Arts (PC88/98, FM); Square (X1, Famicom); D4Enterprise, Inc. (PC-8801); Sierra On-Line (Apple IIgs, MS-DOS); Activision (Amiga); D4Enterprise (Amiga)
- Designers: Hibiki Godai; Satoshi Uesaka
- Composer: Hibiki Godai
- Platform: PC-88, PC-98, FM-7, Sharp X1, Famicom, Sharp MZ, MSX, Amiga, Apple II, Apple IIGS, MS-DOS, Mac, Color Computer 3, Nintendo Switch
- Release: April 1985: PC-8801mkII SR; JP: April 1985 PC-8001mkII SR; JP: June 1985 PC-8801mkII; JP: July 1985 FM7/77/77AV; JP: October 1985 Famicom; JP: December 19, 1985 X1; JP: 1985 MZ; JP: March 1986 PC-9801/M/F/U; JP: April 1986 MSX; JP: July 1986 PC-8801; JP: November 1, 2002 Apple II; NA: 1987 MS-DOS; NA: September 1987 Color Computer 3; NA: 1988 Amiga; EU: 1988 Mac; NA: 1990 Switch; JP: October 26, 2023
- Genre: Run and gun
- Mode: Single-player

Thexder (テグザー, Teguzā) is a run and gun video game from Game Arts, originally released for the NEC PC-8801 in 1985. It was ported to many systems, including the Famicom, MSX, Apple II, and MS-DOS. It was a commercial success, selling over one million units worldwide.

== Gameplay ==
In Thexder, the player controls a fighter robot that is able to transform into a jet and shoot lasers.

== Release ==
The game was originally released in 1985 for the NEC PC-8801 platform in Japan. Game Arts licensed Thexder to Square in order to develop a conversion for the Family Computer (Famicom) game console. In 1987, Game Arts also developed a Thexder conversion for the MSX platform. The game was licensed to Sierra Entertainment for release in the United States. Sierra ported the game to multiple platforms, including the IBM PC, Tandy Color Computer 3, Apple II, Apple IIGS, Apple Macintosh, and Tandy 1000. In 1988, Activision released the game in Europe on the Commodore Amiga. D4 Enterprise was re-released for the Nintendo Switch on October 26, 2023, in Japan as part of the EGG Console.

== Reception ==
Thexder quickly became a best-selling hit, selling over 500,000 copies in Japan by 1987. As the PC-8801 platform was only popular in Japan, Thexder did not garner significant attention abroad until it was converted for the MSX (the best-selling platform in Brazil and many Eastern European countries), Apple II, and DOS, eventually becoming an international hit. It became the company's best-selling title of 1987. By 1990, the game had sold over one million copies worldwide.

Compute! praised the Apple IIGS version of Thexder as the computer's "first true arcade game" with "excellent play value for your dollar". In 1988, The Games Machine gave the Amiga version a 74% score. In 1991, Dragon gave the Macintosh and PC/MS-DOS versions of the game each 4 out of 5 stars. The game went on to sell over one million copies worldwide, becoming Game Arts' biggest-selling title of 1987. Thexder is considered an important breakthrough title for the run-and-gun shooter game genre, paving the way for titles such as Contra and Metal Slug.

== Other games in the series ==
Game	Details
Thexder 2 Original release dates: JP: 1989; (MSX/PC-8801, Game Arts release) 1990-12-30 (DOS) 2003-03-10 (PC-8801, D4E release): UK: 1990-12-30; (DOS): NA: 1990-12-30; (DOS)	Release years by system: 1989 – MSX/PC-8801
Thexder 2 Original release dates: JP: 1989; (MSX/PC-8801, Game Arts release) 1990-12-30 (DOS) 2003-03-10 (PC-8801, D4E release): UK: 1990-12-30; (DOS): NA: 1990-12-30; (DOS)	Notes: Thexder 2, also known as Fire Hawk and Fire Hawk: Thexder - The Second Contact, was released in 1989 on MSX2 and 1990 on DOS. It retained the same concept as the original Thexder but added many improvements. The Fire Hawk robot had the same design as the Thexder: the main laser, shield, and ability to transform into a jet. It also had upgrades to allow it to launch guided missiles, and use special weapons found throughout the game. Obtaining special weapons caused a weapon carrier droid to be deployed, and if positioned correctly, would act as a shield against enemies. Graphics were improved from the original game, and gameplay was divided into sub-levels, with the fourth sub-level containing a "boss" enemy. It was also possible to restart later games at the beginning of a level previously visited.
Thexder 95 Original release date(s): 1995	Release years by system: 1995 – Windows 95
Thexder 95 Original release date(s): 1995	Notes: Thexder 95 (also called Thexder for Windows 95) is a Windows 95 remake of the original Thexder game, which was built with Microsoft's Game SDK (precursor of DirectX). In this game, Thexder can become a tank and jet, and has a large number of new weapons, from grenades to thermal bombs. The game runs in multiple windows: the main view, and several smaller windows each having a different function, e.g., ammo count, map, and actual game, that the gamer could open, close, and resize at will during play. It was also one of Sierra's showcase games at the launch of Windows 95.
Thexder & Fire Hawk Original release date(s): JP: July 15, 2005; (PC-8801, D4E release)	Release years by system: July 15, 2005 – PC-8801
Thexder & Fire Hawk Original release date(s): JP: July 15, 2005; (PC-8801, D4E release)	Notes: Thexder & Fire Hawk is a compilation that includes the MSX versions of Thexder and Thexder 2. The compilation was designed by Hibiki Godai and Satoshi Uesaka, and was released in 2005 for the PC–8801.
Thexder Neo Original release dates: October 1, 2009 (PSP) January 28, 2010 (PS3)	Release years by system: October 1, 2009 – PlayStation Portable (PSP); January 28, 2010 – PlayStation 3
Thexder Neo Original release dates: October 1, 2009 (PSP) January 28, 2010 (PS3)	Notes: Thexder Neo is a complete rework of the original PC game from 1985, released by Square Enix. In early 2009, Square Enix sent an application to the ESRB to receive a rating for a game titled "Thexder Neo". Later that year, the game's existence was confirmed by Square Enix at the Tokyo Game Show. It was released worldwide on the PlayStation Network on October 1, 2009 as a download for the PlayStation Portable and on January 28, 2010 for the PlayStation 3.
