= Grandia Online =

2009 video game

- Developer: Game Arts
- Publisher: GungHo Online Entertainment
- Composer: Noriyuki Iwadare
- Series: Grandia
- Engine: BigWorld Technology
- Platform: Microsoft Windows
- Release: JP: August 26, 2009
- Genre: Massively multiplayer online role-playing game
- Mode: Multiplayer

Grandia Online (グランディア オンライン, Gurandeia Onrain) was a Japanese free-to-play massively multiplayer online role-playing game developed by Game Arts and published by GungHo Online Entertainment for Microsoft Windows as part of their Grandia series. Although originally announced in 2004, the game was beset by a number of delays and lulls in development. It eventually received a final retail release in Japan nearly five years later in August 2009. It was the first online multiplayer game in the series, as well as the first to be initially developed for the PC. It retains many features seen in previous Grandia games, including visual themes, characters, and a similar combat system. The game utilized the BigWorld Technology Suite to render its vast world, and featured music from series veteran Noriyuki Iwadare. Although the game did not require a subscription fee, optional in-game items were only available through paid microtransactions.

Acting as a prequel to the original Grandia, Grandia Online's story takes place many years beforehand during the "Age of Genesis", a time marked by adventure and exploration. Players created a character from one of three races: the adventurous and adaptable Humans, the childlike, bushy-tailed Coltas, or the imposing, war-like Ralgas, as they travel the world to unlock the mystery of a strange occurrence which petrified their home village. During gameplay, players interact and battle with others, as well as with computer-controlled partners.

The game was officially shut down on September 28, 2012.

== Gameplay ==
Gameplay screen from Grandia Online

Grandia Online was a massively multiplayer online role-playing game presented using completely three-dimensional environments and characters. Before playing, users were required to create a GungHo ID from the game's official website, as well as register an account used to log into the game's server. After logging in, players created a character from one of three available races, whose appearances can be customized in a number of ways, including face, hair, eyes, gender, and initial statistics, which determined their specific strengths and weaknesses. When entering the game world, a character's appearance could be further customized by obtaining new equipment and using special dyes to alter their color.

Characters were controlled from a third-person perspective, with the camera being completely movable by the user, and basic movement consisting of walking, running, and jumping. The game's user interface contained a text box for chatting with other players, as well as a mini-map for navigation that shows the location of objects and building in the vicinity of the character. All actions are performed by using a combination of keyboard shortcuts along with the mouse, and players could customize macro commands for single-click movement, communication, or combat abilities through the game's configuration menu, which could be placed on interface's hotbar for later use. A player may interact with static, non-player characters found in towns or throughout the game who expanded the game's story and could offer quests which could be completed for helpful rewards. In addition to a main character, players were given the option to be joined by a single, computer-controlled partner using the game's Partner System, whose actions were customized by using the appropriate menu. Players could also group with one another to form a party of up to eight individuals, who each shared access to a special chat channel and were able to view each other's current status. With each player able to have their own computer partner, the total group size could reach a maximum of 16 characters.

=== Combat ===
Combat in Grandia Online took place in real-time and retains many similarities to previous games in the series, including the Initiative Point (IP) Gauge, which was used for the game's Ultimate Action Battle System. The gauge, represented as a circle, contained icons representing each character in a player's party, as well as each enemy monster which was currently engaged. The icons moved across the gauge to its end, which allowed the player to accumulate combo points that can be saved to unleash powerful combination attacks along with other party members. Special combat abilities called Just Commands could be learned by continually using an equipped weapon, and occupy their own specific hotbar that can be quickly used during battle. As players defeat enemies, they gain experience points which go towards gaining levels, allowing a character to become stronger and face progressively more difficult opponents. The number of individuals in a player's party, as well as the use of computer partners and high level differences between characters can all adversely affect experience gain.

== Plot ==
Grandia Online was set in a fantasy world that occupies the same universe as the original Grandia video game, and took place many years beforehand during the fabled "Age of Genesis". All players began their journey as an escapee from a village that has been mysteriously overcome by a dark force, becoming petrified and unlivable. Meeting with a powerful sorceress named Liete, the player learns that similar events are happening across the world, and an investigation as to its source is taking place. Venturing into the game's world, players traveled across the land interacting with playable and non-playable characters to expand the game's story, leading them to numerous locations including the Pulse of Gaia, a blighted land believed to be the source of the corruption, and the homeland of the ancient Icarians, a race known for their prowess with magic. GungHo games planned to introduce new plot points that expand the story of Gaia and the Icarians through regular updates.

Players chose a character based on one of three races who inhabit the world: Humans, a small, bushy-tailed raced called the Coltas, and the imposing, tribal Ralgas. Other inhabitants of the world included the diminutive rabbit-like Mogays, who acted as merchants and guides, and numerous species of monsters and animals that serve as the game's primary enemies. Ruins from past civilizations appeared as additional areas, and included opponents such as automatons and robots from a bygone era. As the player ventured further into the game, they encountered progressively more difficult enemies and boss characters who required large groups to defeat.

== Development ==
Grandia Online was first announced by Game Arts in late 2004 as a collaborative effort between their company and GungHo Online Entertainment under the codename "Project: GO". The game was first revealed during a GungHo Games panel at the 2005 Tokyo Game Show in Tokyo, Japan, where the company announced that they would be working with Game Arts to bring their Grandia role-playing game series to the PC as a "real adventure-themed MMORPG." Development for the game began shortly after completion of Game Arts' previous endeavor, Grandia III, released earlier that year in Japan, and was overseen by GungHo president Morishita Yoshikazu and Game Arts producer Yoshitada Iwata. Inspiration for the game came from Gravity Corporation's Ragnarok Online, as well as to fill the need for "Japan's increased demand for online games." The following October, one month after the game's announcement, GungHo announced plans to become a majority shareholder for the Game Arts corporation, turning the company into a subsidiary and making Grandia Online an in-house production. An open beta test period was originally planned for the first quarter of 2006, with the game's final release following later that year, which was pushed back to the following September, and then an undetermined date due to development issues.

GungHo would remain quiet on Grandia Online's progress until early 2007, when Game Arts announced that the title had been sold by GungHo to online software producer Online Game Revolution Fund Number 1 for ¥2.6 billion, and that development would continue under the game's new name, Grandia Zero. Game Arts would later re-acquire the game's production rights some time later, as well as return the game to its original title, yet development activities remained undisclosed for several months. During this period, industry rumors began to surface that the game may have been cancelled.

In April 2009, news of Grandia Online's progress was finally made public, with the launch of an official countdown website that opened on April 21, revealing that the game was not only still being produced, but that a new open beta test would be launched the following July. To celebrate the occasion, Game Arts announced they would be re-releasing the original Grandia on Sony's PlayStation Network download service, as well host a limited, 60-person public test period for a demo of the game the following May in Tokyo's Akihabara district. The game utilized the BigWorld Technology Suite, which was previously used in GungHo's Hokuto no Ken Online, and "promise[d] a development solution specifically for scalable next-gen MMOs and virtual worlds." The company had planned to release the game commercially by the end of Q2 2009, with a public beta test instead pushed back to July and the launch version arriving in August.

The game operated for three years until it was eventually shut down on September 28, 2012.

=== Audio ===
Character	Actor
Human (male)	Jun Fukuyama
Human (female)	Rie Kugimiya
Colta (male)	Mariya Ise
Colta (female)	Miyuki Sawashiro
Ralga (male)	Yuichi Nakamura
Ralga (female)	Junko Minagawa
Liete	Kikuko Inoue
Nina	Yūko Minaguchi
Kachua	Sayaka Ohara
Ernest	Atsuko Tanaka
Mogay (male)	Mutsumi Tamura
Mogay (female)	Asumi Kodama
Male Merchant	Hayato Nakata
Female Merchant	Maki Midori

Background music for Grandia Online was written by series veteran Noriyuki Iwadare, the composer for all previous Grandia titles. The game also featured voice acting during certain story sequences that the player would encounter during play, which were provided by anime and video game actors including Kikuko Inoue, who reprises her role as Liete from the first Grandia. Player characters were also voiced, with sound clips used during combat and certain emotes, and varied by the character's race and gender. Grandia Online's official theme song, "Earth Trip" by Minami Kuribayashi, was released as a single in July 2009, alongside a limited-edition version that contains a code which could be redeemed for special in-game items.
