= Gynoug =

1991 video game

- European Mega Drive box art
- Developer: NCS Corporation
- Publishers: JP: Masaya; NA: DreamWorks; EU: Sega
- Composer: Noriyuki Iwadare
- Platforms: Sega Genesis; Nintendo Switch; PlayStation 4; Xbox One
- Release: Sega Genesis: JP: January 25, 1991; NA: June 1991; EU: March 1992; Nintendo Switch, PlayStation 4, Xbox One: WW: November 12, 2021
- Genre: Scrolling shooter
- Mode: Single-player

Gynoug (ジノーグ, Jinōgu), known in North America as Wings of Wor, is a 1991 scrolling shooter video game developed by NCS Corporation and published by Masaya for the Sega Genesis. The game was released in North America and Europe in 1991 and in Japan on January 25, 1991, and re-released on the Wii Virtual Console exclusively in Japan on May 20, 2008, and was re-released for the Nintendo Switch, PlayStation 4 and Xbox One on November 12, 2021.

== Plot ==
The land of Iccus is being invaded by legions of demons and monsters, led by a being known only as the Destroyer. The heavens send the angel Wor to defend Iccus and put an end to the Destroyer's dark plans.

== Reception ==
Reception

Review scores
Publication	Score
MegaTech	92%
Mega	52%
Mean Machines	88%

Award
Publication	Award
MegaTech	Hyper Game

Mean Machines magazine reviewed the title, giving it 88%.

MegaTech 5 magazine praised the power-ups and the graphics used for the bosses.
