= Thexder 95 =

1995 video game

- Developer: Synergistic Software
- Publisher: Sierra On-Line
- Series: Thexder
- Engine: Game SDK
- Platform: Windows 95
- Release: 1995
- Genre: Run and gun
- Mode: Single-player

Thexder 95, also called Thexder for Windows 95, is a remake of the first game in the Thexder series, which was originally released for the NEC PC-8801.

It was built with Microsoft's Game SDK.

== Gameplay ==
Thexder can become a tank and jet, and has a large number of new weapons, from grenades to thermal bombs.

The game runs in multiple windows: the main view, and several smaller windows each having a different function, e.g., ammo count, map, and actual game, that the gamer can open and close at will during play.

== Marketing ==
This was one of Sierra's showcase games at the launch of Windows 95.

== Reception ==
Computer Games Magazine rated it 2.5/5.

Next Generation reviewed the PC version of the game, rating it two stars out of five, and stated that "The graphics look great for Windows 98. If you run it on the minimum system requirement [...] however, Thexder looks like he's running with magnetic boots on, and the enemies come at you so slowly it's hardly a challenge to pick them off before they get too near. That's OK if you're not good at platform shooters, but your replay value is practically nil."

In 1996, Computer Gaming World declared Thexder the 23rd-worst computer game ever released.

Quad-City Times said that "Even with better effects than those in many other two-dimensional, side-scrolling maze games, the overall concept presents few challenges that gamers haven't seen before. Thexder shows it's the action, not the operating system, that makes an arcade game click."
