= Grandia (video game) =

1997 video game

- European PlayStation cover art
- Developer: Game Arts
- Publishers: JP: Entertainment Software Publishing; NA: Sony Computer Entertainment; EU: Ubi Soft; WW: GungHo Online (digital)
- Designer: Takeshi Miyaji
- Composer: Noriyuki Iwadare
- Series: Grandia
- Platforms: Sega Saturn, PlayStation, Nintendo Switch, Windows, PlayStation 4, Xbox One
- Release: December 18, 1997: Saturn; JP: December 18, 1997 PlayStation; JP: June 24, 1999; NA: October 28, 1999; EU: March 31, 2000 Switch; WW: August 16, 2019; JP: March 25, 2020 Windows; WW: October 15, 2019 PlayStation 4, Xbox One; WW: March 26, 2024
- Genre: Role-playing
- Mode: Single-player

Grandia (Note: グランディア (Gurandia) in Japanese) is a role-playing video game developed by Game Arts and published by Entertainment Software Publishing for the Sega Saturn console as the first game in their Grandia series. Released in Japan in 1997, the game was ported to the PlayStation in 1999, with an English version of the game appearing on the platform in North America in the following October by Sony Computer Entertainment, and in Europe in 2000 by Ubisoft. The game was produced by much of the same staff who worked on the company's previous role-playing endeavor, the Lunar series, including producer Yoichi Miyagi and composer Noriyuki Iwadare.

Grandia's combat mechanics have been carried over to future games within the franchise. The game has also spawned an expansion disk (Grandia: Digital Museum) and a spin-off title (Grandia: Parallel Trippers) - both released exclusively in Japan. In celebration of the renewed development on Grandia Online, which acts as a prequel to Grandia, the game was re-released on Sony's PlayStation Network platform in 2009. A high-definition remaster of the game and its sequel, Grandia II, was released for Nintendo Switch in August 2019, and for Windows in October 2019. PlayStation 4 and Xbox One versions were released in March 2024.

The game is set in a fantasy world of emerging technology and exploration. A young boy named Justin inherits a magic stone that leads him on a journey around the world to uncover the mystery of a long-lost civilization. Along the way, he meets other adventurers who join him on his quest, which draws the attention of the militaristic Garlyle Forces who seek to uncover the secrets of the past as well. Grandia received a largely positive critical response during its original release, and was voted by readers of the Japanese magazine Famitsu as the 73rd greatest game of all time in a 2006 poll.

== Gameplay ==
Grandia's environments are depicted as three-dimensional maps, with characters represented by 2-D animated bitmap sprites. The camera is fully rotational and follows the party from an angled third-person perspective; it is often necessary to rotate the camera to see hidden items or passageways.

Grandia features a rotational party roster. The statistics of each party member increase each time they gain a new level by defeating enemies and earning experience points. Characters learn new abilities through the repeated use of weapons and spells. Once a particular weapon/magic spell is used a specific number of times in battle, its Skill Level is raised. Weapons are divided into different classes, including swords, maces, axes, whips and knives. Each party member's potential abilities are listed on a Skill screen within the game's main menu, as well as the Skill requirements that must be met in order to learn them. The game encourages players to switch between weapons periodically. When a weapon or magic element levels up, permanent stat points are added to that character as well. For example, when a character's water skill levels up, they also receive +1 HP and +2 MP.

Monsters in Grandia are visible on the field and wander around aimlessly until the party gets close. A battle begins once the monster touches a party member. If the player manages to sneak up on the enemy and make contact from the rear, they gain a preemptive strike and attack first. Likewise, if an enemy touches a party member from behind, they get the first strike. Combat is shown from a third-person overhead view. The IP bar at the bottom right corner of the screen displays a row of icons, which represent all party members and enemies on the screen. When an icon drifts to the "Command" segment towards the end of the IP Bar, that character can choose their next action. The IP Bar also shows the time it takes for enemies to attack; if the party manages to land a strike during the period where an enemy is preparing an attack, that enemy's attack is canceled.

== Story ==
=== Characters ===
The extended cast of Grandia, including main and supporting characters

The story centers around Justin (ジャスティン, Jasutin), an aspiring adventurer from Parm. He lives with his mother, Lilly (リリィ, Riryi), in their home in the upstairs floor of their family-owned restaurant. Justin's father vanished years ago on an adventure, and his mother is worried that he will try to follow in her late husband's footsteps, yet Justin, a romanticist, insists that there are still uncharted parts of the world, despite general perception that the "End of the World" — an insurmountable stone wall found on a newly discovered continent — has closed the book on the age of adventuring. Other characters include Sue (スー, Sū), a friend from his town who acts as a surrogate sister to Justin; Feena (フィーナ, Fīna), a seasoned adventurer and Justin's idol; Gadwin (ガドイン, Gadoin), a valiant knight who mentors Justin in the way of swordsmanship; Rapp (ラップ, Rappu), an ill-mannered youth from the village of Cafu; Milda (ミルダ, Miruda), a feral giantess who, despite her volatile nature, has a sweet side, particularly for her husband; Guido (ギド, Gido), a traveling salesman and chieftain of a diminutive, rabbit-like clan called the Mogay; and Liete (リエーテ, Riēte), a mysterious woman who contacts Justin inside the Sult Ruins. She resides in an ancient space station and serves as a living database of an ancient civilization.

The game's main antagonist is General Baal (バール, Bāru), the calculating leader of the Garlyle Forces. Despite appearing to be involved in the excavation of ruins for purely philanthropic reasons, he has his own agenda. His son and second-in-command is Colonel Mullen (ミューレン, Myūren), a tactician who is well liked by his subordinates. Alongside him is his aide-de-camp, Leen (リーン, Rīn), a young soldier who has gained a special place in the military for reasons unknown. Nana (ナナ), Saki (サキ), and Mio (ミオ) are three female commanders who are each assigned their own squadrons. Despite their best efforts, they often bungle important missions, particularly if Justin happens to be involved. Each one of them has a crush on Colonel Mullen and outwardly show their jealousy of Leen as a result.

=== Plot ===
Grandia is set in a fantasy world where societies thrive in an era of increasing technological developments following the collapse of the ancient Angelou (エンジュール, Enjūru; ("Enjule")) civilization centuries before. General Baal, leader of the militaristic Garlyle Forces, along with his son Colonel Mullen (Murren) and Mullen's love interest Lieutenant Leen, make their way to an archaeological site where treasures of the ancient people are believed to be resting. Justin, a young boy keen on adventure who lives in the port town of Parm just outside the dig site, travels to the area along with his friend Sue to investigate, as well as gather clues about an artifact left by Justin's missing father, the Spirit Stone. Slipping past the Garlyle soldiers into the ruins, Justin finds a holographic device that displays the image of a woman named Liete, who tells him that his stone holds great power, and he must travel far to the east in search of Alent (アレント, Arento), the ancient city of knowledge, to learn of its true potential. Returning home, Justin avoids his mother and sneaks out to the docks early the next day to board a ship bound for the New World across the ocean while promising to become a great adventurer like his father.

Aboard the ship, Justin discovers Sue has stowed away, and meets with another young adventurer named Feena, who joins the two in saving the vessel from a haunted ship that appears in a fog. After a long journey, they arrive in the town of New Parm only to have Feena kidnapped by the Adventurer Society's President, who wants her as his wife. Stealing her away, the three travel to a nearby ruin where they once again meet Liete deep inside, who tells them that Alent lies further within the New World beyond a massive continent-spanning wall known as "The End of the World". The Garlyle Forces intercept the three as they travel farther, and question Justin on his ability to manipulate ancient machinery within the ruins. Escaping their capture aboard a military train, the three make their way to a village at the foot of the great wall, where it is revealed that Leen is Feena's long-lost sister. Resolving to continue their journey, the team make their way up the wall, setting up camps along the way before eventually reaching the top, gaining access to the remainder of the continent on the other side.

Making their way through a forest, the three meet Gadwin, a beast-man and seasoned knight who sees potential in Justin and leads the three to the ancient Twin Towers in order to contact Liete again. After being intercepted by the Garlyle Forces once again, they make their escape, only for Sue to fall ill as they near another village. Fearing for her safety, Justin obtains a teleportation orb and lets Sue use it to return to Parm and continues onward with Gadwin and Feena to the bounds of the continent and yet another ocean. Justin then defeats Gadwin in a duel, the latter allowing Justin and Feena to have his boat, before leaving the party.

Taking Gadwin's ship to another island, Justin and Feena begin to express their feelings for one another. Landing on a beach outside a beast-man village, the two meet Rapp, who asks them to help destroy a nearby tower that is emanating a dark energy and petrifying the land. Finding the tower to be controlled by the Garlyle Forces, the team meets with Milda, a beast-woman, inside and join her in destroying the source of the corruption, which turns out to be a plant-like creature known as "Gaia" being grown by Garlyle researchers under the orders of General Baal. After destroying the creature and taking a sample of its seeds, Justin is confronted by Leen who steals them back.

Moving forward in search of Alent, the party meets a traveling merchant named Guido who leads them to his home town, where he acts as chieftain despite his young appearance, allowing them access to more ruins. It is here that Feena discovers innate magic powers that manifest in the form of wings when she is in trouble, and is promptly captured along with Justin's Spirit Stone by invading Garlyle soldiers and taken aboard Baal's flagship, the Grandeur. Baal reveals to her that he intends to revive a fully powered Gaia using the stone to take over the world and remake it to his own design. Justin, Rapp, and Guido manage to board the Grandeur and engage the Garlyle troops aboard before confronting Baal. Due to the self-destruct mechanism being activated by accident, the ship starts to fall apart, and Guido and Rapp end up getting separated from Justin, leaving him to face Baal alone. The general forces Justin to hand over the Spirit Stone by threatening Feena, but Baal keeps her hostage anyway. Justin therefore is forced to fight Baal, but learns during the fight that the madman had fused with Gaia. He knocks Justin off the burning ship, but Feena breaks free from Baal and dives after Justin. The Grandeur subsequently breaks apart in the air, apparently taking Baal and the Spirit Stone with it.

After reuniting, the party finally reaches Alent. Here, Justin meets Liete in person, who reveals to him that his stone is actually an ancient artifact forged by the Icarians, a race of powerful sorcerers who lived during the Angelou era, and was a gift to the humans who lived at the time to use as they pleased to bring prosperity, but when they became corrupted by dark desires, it instead gave birth to Gaia, who nearly destroyed the world. The Icarians sacrificed themselves to save the planet and humanity, and enacted a spell that two of their kind would be born into the world should Gaia ever be revived, destined to also sacrifice themselves to save the world until the next revival in an endless loop. Realizing Feena and Leen are the current revival of the Icarians, Justin sets off to save them from the Gaia-fused Baal, who now faces mutiny among his troops, including his son Mullen.

With Gaia proving more than a match for the entire Garlyle army, Leen accepts her destiny and sacrifices herself to lower his defenses. Although Mullen pleads with Feena to finish Gaia, Justin argues that the problem cannot be solved with more sacrifice since Gaia will just revive later. Thus Gaia must be defeated outright to end the cycle. Though Gaia defeats the troops and spreads its corruption around the planet, Justin is able to sum up the courage to face the evil with help from his friends, and travels to the underground heart of Gaia itself to destroy it and the Spirit Stone once and for all. With Gaia defeated permanently, the world experiences a new age of peace. Leen is also restored to life with Gaia's destruction. In an epilogue ten years later, Sue, now a teenager, reunites with Justin and Feena, who arrive home after nearly a decade of adventure with children in tow.

== Development ==
Grandia was developed by Game Arts over a period of more than two years beginning after the release of the company's previous role-playing video game title, Lunar: Eternal Blue for the Sega Mega-CD. The project, headed by producer Yoichi Miyaji and directors Takeshi Miyaji and Toshiaki Hontani, was also originally intended for the Mega-CD system, but was shifted to the Saturn early in development due to Sega's abandoning the platform. According to a spokesman for Game Arts, Grandia was created as part of the company's on-going effort to "provide consumers with good games rather than try to follow market trends", opting instead to create a product that would tell a compelling story catering primarily to their existing fanbase. The game contains 20,000 frames of animation.

The Saturn version was released in December 1997 exclusively in Japan, along with a special Limited Edition for those who pre-ordered the game between October 25 and November 30, 1997, which included a fold-out cloth map of the Grandia world, as well as a mini radio drama disc featuring voiced scenes from the game. In February 1998, South Korean company Wooyoung System announced plans to release Grandia locally around June of that year, alongside Lunar: Silver Star Story, as part of its Sega Saturn software distribution programme. In November 1998, Grandia was re-released in Japan as the Grandia Memorial Package, which featured new instruction booklet artwork and a lower sales price. Sega of America had commented that they had no plans to bring an English version of the game to North American audiences on their system, which prompted an online petition originating on the role-playing game fansite LunarNET designed to alert the company of consumer interest. Despite gathering several hundred signatures in only a few days, as well as promotion from gaming website GameSpot, the Saturn version was never released internationally. Sega Europe and Game Arts opened negotiations over Grandia, but this likewise failed to lead to an overseas release. Telecom Animation Film, AIC, Gonzo, Production I.G, and Studio Junio all helped animate the game by being animation support, and the CG support.

In March 1999, Game Arts's Japanese publisher ESP Software showcased a PlayStation version of Grandia at that year's Tokyo Game Show expo, along with confirmation that the game would be released in English for the first time in North America by Sony Computer Entertainment America. Working Designs, which had previously worked with Game Arts on bringing their Lunar games to the region, had expressed interest in publishing the game, but were ultimately unable to secure the rights. New features for the PlayStation version included support for the system's DualShock analog control sticks and vibration function, as well as compatibility with Sony's Japanese-only PocketStation peripheral, which allows players to download game data on a portable device for use in a special mini-game. Although the company had expressed interest in bringing the game to the PlayStation as early as 1998, technical problems originally prevented the title from being ported to the system. Game Arts released the game with a slight loss in frame rate and a marginal decrease in video effects the following June. The North American version was originally announced by Sony as a summer release during the 1999 Electronic Entertainment Expo in Los Angeles, but was pushed back to the following October. Grandia was released for the PlayStation in Europe in 2000 by Ubisoft.

Nearly ten years after Grandia's release on the PlayStation, Game Arts announced in April 2009 that the PlayStation version of the game would be released as a downloadable title on Sony's PlayStation Network service in Japan on April 22, 2009, in celebration of the resuming development on the company's long-dormant Grandia Online project. It was released in North America on February 25, 2010, and in Europe on November 10, 2010.

=== Audio ===
The music for Grandia was written by Noriyuki Iwadare, who had previously worked with Game Arts as composer for their Lunar series on the Sega CD. Iwadare was called upon to write the music due to his relationship with the company, and claims that his work on Grandia was "a turning point in my career", and described the music-making process as "very interesting". Grandia's sound team utilized the latest technology available at the time to create the game's background themes, included the game's main theme, "Theme of Grandia", which was composed by Iwadare in just one night after looking at an illustration for the game. The music was recorded at Skywalker Sound with producer Tom Myers. In addition to music, the game features voice acting during battles and certain story scenes, with the Japanese version featuring a number of anime and video game veteran actors. Two of the English version's main characters, Justin and Gadwin, were officially left uncredited. "It's the End" by Japanese rock group L'Arc-en-Ciel, from the band's 1999 Album Ray, was used as the game's official commercial theme song during its re-release on the PlayStation.

In December 1997, selected music tracks from the game were released in Japan on the Grandia Original Soundtrack by King Records across two discs, which were organized as "Orchestra Side" and "Synth Side" according to the type of instrument samples used to compose them. A follow-up album, Grandia Original Soundtrack II, was made available in June 1998, containing an additional two discs of music not featured on the previous album. One year later, in June 1999, a compilation album entitled The Best of Grandia was released by Twofive Records containing some of Iwadare's favorite music from the game, including a never-before released track, "Pavane". Iwadare also produced a special arranged album called Vent: Grandia Arrange Version, with "vent" (IPA: [vɑ̃]) being the French word for "wind", which Iwadare chose because it "carries the image of cool pleasant wind". The album was released in February 1998 by King Records and contains 12 arranged tracks, which Iwadare designed to be "an album, which people would listen at leisure on Sunday mornings".

== Reception ==
=== Saturn version ===
Reception (Saturn)

Aggregate score
Aggregator	Score
GameRankings	87%

Review scores
Publication	Score
Famitsu	9/10, 7/10, 8/10, 8/10
GameSpot	93%
Next Generation	4/5
Consoles +	94%
RPGamer	5/5
RPGFan	95%
Saturn Fan	9/10
Sega Saturn Magazine (JP)	9/10
Sega Saturn Magazine (UK)	97%

Grandia received near-universal acclaim during its original release in Japan, garnering a 9 out of 10 from both Sega Saturn Magazine and Saturn Fan, as well as an 8.75 out of 10 from Weekly TV Gamer. Weekly Famitsu high average score from its editor's gave it their Gold Award ranking. The game earned an "Excellence Award" during the 1997 CESA Japan Game Awards as runner-up for game of the year.

Due to the hype surrounding the game and its not being released outside Japan, a number of American and European publications reviewed the Saturn version as an import. Next Generation lauded the game's use of complex 3D models and animation and detailed audio to create a living and immersive world, as well as the real-time strategy elements and wide array of actions available to the player during combat. While they criticized the frame rate, they concluded that "Grandia's design and innovation will be a benchmark for future RPGs in the 32-bit generation and beyond." The UK-based Sega Saturn Magazine was similarly laudatory to the 3D visuals and attention to detail in the background animations and sound effects, and also praised the character progression over the course of the story. The review emphasized that Sega Saturn Magazine was running a walkthrough of Grandia through several issues so that readers could purchase the game without fear of becoming stuck due to the language barrier. GameSpot claimed that Grandia "beats out Final Fantasy VII in all of the ways that matter," adding that the game was "not only longer, with a more engaging cast of characters, but it lacks the lulls that so many RPGs have because of these merits," awarding the game an Editor's Choice Award. Official U.S. PlayStation Magazine called the game "arguably the best RPG for Sega's Saturn console."

It sold 181,219 units in its first week and would go on to sell 344,554 copies in Japan, becoming the 15th highest-selling game for the system in the region and the country's fourth highest-selling Saturn title of 1997; In addition, North American imports of the game were higher than many other games in the genre at the time due to its positive overseas reception and cancellation of the English release on the platform. In 2006, readers of Famitsu voted the Saturn version the 73rd greatest game of all time during the magazine's Top 100 Favorite Games of All Time feature.

=== PlayStation version ===
Reception (PlayStation)

Aggregate scores
Aggregator	Score
GameRankings	86%
Metacritic	89/100

Review scores
Publication	Score
Electronic Gaming Monthly	9/10
Famitsu	8/10, 9/10, 8/10, 7/10
Game Informer	21.75/30
GamePro	4.5/5
GameRevolution	A−
GameSpot	9.2/10
IGN	9/10
Next Generation	4/5
Official U.S. PlayStation Magazine	4.5/5
The Electric Playground	9/10
Gaming Age	A−
PlayStation World	9/10
RPGamer	9.5/10
RPGFan	100%
Video Games	92%

The PlayStation version of Grandia met with similarly positive reception to the Saturn release, though sales remained lower than the original in Japan, selling approximately 97,460 copies in its first three weeks. It received an aggregate score of 86% on GameRankings and 89/100 on Metacritic. Official U.S. PlayStation Magazine named it as one of the "25 Games You Must Play in 1999", praising the title's colorful presentation and "innovative battle system" and "elegant character advancement system", yet found the game's English voice acting to be "depressingly awkward". GameSpot once again compared Grandia to Square's popular Final Fantasy series, calling it "every bit as worthwhile as Final Fantasy VIII, just in different ways," calling attention to its sound quality that is "as complete and detailed as it visuals", but finding fault in the game's translation and voice work that was declared "inexcusable by today's standards."

GamePro magazine felt that the game had aged during its two-year transition to the PlayStation, but that the game's presentation was still "amazingly detailed and well designed." The publication would cite the game's music as its major downfall, calling it "repetitive and annoying and will have the player reaching for the volume control", as well as the relatively low detail on enemy monsters when compared to the rest of the game, yet ultimately felt that "Grandia's puzzles, gorgeous locations, and solid story more than make up for its minor flaws." IGN, conversely, found the game's music to be "good", yet found its "overly simplistic tones and themes" to be a turn-off for some, yet adding that "you'd be selling the game short if you didn't push through and see the game to conclusion." "In 2000, IGN would rank Grandia 17th on its list of the top 25 PlayStation games of all time, calling it "Game Arts' magnum opus and probably their most historically significant project." Eurogamer, in a 2007 retrospective, called the game "fantastic", praising the title's "vastly enjoyable battle system which few other games have rivaled, even in recent years".

Francesca Reyes reviewed the PlayStation version of the game for Next Generation, rating it four stars out of five, and stated that "Light-hearted, but incredibly involving, Grandia proves to be worth the wait."

== Grandia: Digital Museum ==
Grandia: Digital Museum
- Developer: Game Arts
- Publisher: ESP Software
- Composer: Noriyuki Iwadare
- Series: Grandia
- Platform: Sega Saturn
- Release: JP: May 28, 1998
- Genre: RPG
- Mode: Single-player

Grandia: Digital Museum (グランディア ～デジタルミュージアム～, Gurandia Dejitaru Myuziamu) is an extension of Grandia, developed by Game Arts and published by ESP Software for the Sega Saturn. Released exclusively in Japan in May 1998, the game features character graphics, textures, and music lifted directly from its predecessor. Players can also swap save data between the core Grandia disc and the Digital Museum on the Saturn memory card.

The game's story is set sometime after the events of the original Grandia, with the main characters Justin, Feena, and Sue being transported to a large museum created by the sorceress Liete made to honor their adventure during the first game. When most of the exhibits go missing, Liete uses her magic to transport the three to four separate dungeons each containing remnants of their previous journey to find and restore them to their proper place. As players progress through the game, bonus material becomes unlocked in the museum itself, which includes music files, artwork, and movie clips related to Grandia, as well as minigames.

=== Gameplay ===
==== The Museum Itself ====
The following exhibits are found in the four dungeons:

- Artwork and storyboards - Several pieces of rare artwork and storyboards. Each one carries a small collection which can be viewed.
- Character Portraits - The character portraits that pop up each time a character is speaking.
- Sound Theatre - A collection of sound or radio plays featuring the Grandia cast.
- Grandia 1 saves - Allows the player to download a save file for use in the full Grandia 1 game.
- Bestiary - A library of all the monsters and their characteristics.
- Arcade - An arcade with mini-games. Including games such as baseball, archery, an eating competition, and a text-based game.

=== Reception ===
Grandia: Digital Museum debuted as the fifth highest-selling game of the week during its launch in Japan, and would go on to sell approximately 32,226 copies in its first month.

== HD Remaster ==
The game received a remastered version on the Nintendo Switch as part of the Grandia HD Collection on August 16, 2019. A standalone Grandia HD Remaster for Windows via Steam was released on October 15, 2019. According to GungHo Online, the remastered game used the PlayStation version's code, but referenced the Sega Saturn version for the details and effects to create the "definitive version" of the game. The remastered game features enhanced details to UI / sprites / texture art, visually enhanced original cinematic videos, widescreen support and customizable resolutions (PC only), Steam Trading Cards / Steam Achievements (PC only), Japanese and English Audio, additional French and German localization, and gamepad and keyboard support with remappable controls (PC only). The remaster was released in Japan and received Japanese language support along in other regions, along with various fixes, on March 25, 2020.
