= Grandia II =

2000 video game

- North American Dreamcast cover art
- Developer: Game Arts (Note: PlayStation 2 port developed by Rocket Studio, the Anniversary Edition developed by SkyBox Labs, the HD Remaster developed by Sickhead Games)
- Publishers: JP: Game Arts (DC); JP: Enix (PS2); WW: Ubi Soft; WW: GungHo Online (digital)
- Director: Katsunori Saito
- Producers: Takeshi Miyaji; Toshiyuki Uchida
- Designer: Osamu Harada
- Programmers: Kazuyuki Ohata; Kazuhiro Irie
- Writers: Kei Shigema; Yuichi Hasegawa
- Composer: Noriyuki Iwadare
- Series: Grandia
- Platforms: Dreamcast, PlayStation 2, Windows, Nintendo Switch, PlayStation 4, Xbox One
- Release: August 3, 2000: Dreamcast; JP: August 3, 2000; NA: December 5, 2000; EU: February 23, 2001 PlayStation 2; NA: January 29, 2002; JP: February 21, 2002; EU: March 28, 2002 Windows; NA: March 12, 2002; EU: April 12, 2002 Anniversary Edition; WW: August 24, 2015 HD Remaster; WW: October 15, 2019 Switch; WW: August 16, 2019; JP: March 25, 2020 PlayStation 4, Xbox One; WW: March 26, 2024
- Genre: Role-playing
- Mode: Single-player

Grandia II (Note: Japanese: グランディアII, Hepburn: Gurandia Tsū) is a role-playing video game developed by Game Arts originally for the Dreamcast console as part of their Grandia series. Initially released in Japan by Game Arts in August 2000, the game was published by Ubi Soft in North America in December 2000 and in Europe in February 2001. Grandia II was later ported to PlayStation 2, where it was released worldwide throughout 2002, and for Windows exclusively in North America and Europe later that year.

An enhanced port, based on the Dreamcast version and titled Grandia II Anniversary Edition, was released by GungHo Online Entertainment for Steam and GOG.com in August 2015. A high-definition remaster of the game and the original Grandia was released for Nintendo Switch in August 2019; an associated update for the Anniversary Edition was released in October 2019. The PlayStation 4 and Xbox One versions were released in March 2024.

The game was developed by many of the same staff members who worked on the original Grandia, including music composer Noriyuki Iwadare. However, it was designed around creating a more "mature" product than the previous title and the first in the series to feature fully three-dimensional graphics.

The game is set in a fantasy world thousands of years after a battle between Granas, the god of light, and Valmar, the god of darkness, nearly destroyed the planet until Valmar was split into pieces and scattered across the land. In the aftermath of the battle, the Church of Granas has led humanity to prosperity by spreading the word of good. However, when a young mercenary named Ryudo is charged to protect a songstress from the church named Elena, their journey reveals that the church's history, as well as the history of the world, is not all it seems.

While the original Dreamcast version of the game received a largely positive response from critics in Japan and the West, its later ports to the PlayStation 2 and PC were typically seen as inferior due to a combination of technical shortcomings and other high-profile games released during the transition.

== Gameplay ==
The turn-based battle system is based around the IP gauge. Character icons move from left to right on the gauge. Upon reaching the beginning of the action phase on the gauge, characters select an action. That action is executed when their icon reaches the end of the action phase. The system supports limited movement during a battle; an invisible barrier prevents characters from wandering outside the arena.

Characters can run from one place to another, strike opponents, and then retreat. Selecting "critical" makes a character or enemy strike an opponent simultaneously. If the critical lands during the opponent's action phase, it will "cancel" the opponent's move and push the opponent's icon substantially backward along the IP gauge, delaying the opponent from taking action. Selecting "combo" makes a character land two hits on an enemy. The hits can be increased with certain accessories, up to four hits per combo. A combo can also "counter" if it hits an enemy in an attack pose, dealing additional damage. Suppose the combo kills the intended target before reaching the final blow. In that case, the character will attack the closest enemy to complete the combo.

Characters can use magic from equipped Mana Eggs. Using magic consumes MP. More powerful magic takes longer to cast. Special moves and spells can be learned with Skills Coins and Magic Coins and have a maximum level of 5. Spell efficiency is increased and casting time decreases as the level increases. Spells can be cast instantly if a character has skills equipped, giving a +100% bonus to the element of that particular spell. Special move sets are learned from Skill Books, then equipped onto characters. Skills can boost stats or add additional effects, such as increased item drops or a canceling effect to certain spells.

== Plot ==
Ryudo is a mercenary known as a Geohound, accompanied by his talking bird companion, Skye. The Church of Granas hires him to escort Elena, a Songstress of Granas, to Garmia Tower for a ceremony. Upon arrival, he is asked to wait while they perform the ritual. However, he hears a scream and rushes up to the top floor. Seeing everyone dead and Elena with a pair of wings, he rescues her, and both return to Carbo Village. There, Ryudo is asked by the priest to escort Elena to St. Heim Papal State to seek Pope Zera's help to cleanse Elena of the Wings of Valmar, one of several pieces of Valmar, which now possesses her.

Before he can turn the job down, the village is attacked by a mysterious winged woman, who engages and defeats Ryudo in battle. She introduces herself as Millenia and disappears. Ryudo accepts the job and departs for St. Heim with Elena. In the town of Agear, Millenia appears again, this time more friendly, and teams up with Ryudo. She accidentally reveals herself as the Wings of Valmar and that she possesses Elena, sharing her body as a separate being. After Roan and the Beast Man, Mareg, join the group, they find more pieces of Valmar, which Millenia absorbs after they are defeated.

When the group arrives at St. Heim Papal State, Elena meets with Pope Zera, who wishes to speak with Ryudo. The Pope requests that he find the legendary Granasaber, a weapon wielded by Granas that was used to defeat Valmar. Ryudo reluctantly agrees, and the group travels to Roan's hometown of Cyrum. Upon arrival, they rest at the inn as Roan departs. The following day, it is revealed that Roan is the prince and that the people of Cyrum once assisted Valmar against Granas in the ancient war. The party enters the castle, finds the Gate of Darkness open, and discovers an ancient factory underneath the castle. They encounter the Claws of Valmar and, later, Melfice back in the castle. Melfice is Ryudo's brother and the man Mareg seeks, who flees after defeating the group in battle, telling Ryudo to face him at home. Roan is crowned king and chooses to stay in Cyrum to encourage its people that the past does not predict their future. After being rescued, Tio, the being possessed by the Claws and an Automata, joins the group.

The party arrives by boat in the village of Garlan, Ryudo's hometown. Ryudo is immediately chastised for returning and commanded to leave. He reveals that Melfice has returned, and he plans to kill him to end his torment of the world. At the inn, a disguised Skye reveals Ryudo's history to Elena. Garlan used to be a village of swordsmen, with Melfice being the best. However, one night, during a storm, the idol in the hills grew restless, so the villagers sent Reena, Melfice's fiancé, to pray at the altar. She didn't return, and Melfice investigated, being secretly followed by Ryudo. In the shrine, Ryudo witnessed Melfice murder Reena. Ryudo later fled from town and stayed away for three years, causing the villagers to believe he abandoned them, hence their contempt. In the morning, the group travels up the mountain to confront Melfice.

At its peak, they defeat Melfice, who afterward reconciles with Ryudo and informs the group of the Granasaber's location before dying. While Ryudo grieves, the Horns possess him, causing him to lose consciousness. At the inn, Elena asks Millenia for help, but she initially refuses. However, she relents and uses her powers to seal the Horns inside of Ryudo, who then awakens with a renewed sense of purpose. But Elena questions Granas, as it was Valmar who saved Ryudo.

The group travels to Nannan, Mareg's hometown, near the location of the Granasaber. The group is then informed of the Granasaber's whereabouts: within a giant cyclone to the east. The group travels there and deactivates the artificial storm, revealing the Granasaber. However, Selene, the High Priestess, appears and sacrifices a Cathedral Knight to revive the Body of Valmar around the Granasaber; the group enters the body and destroys it. Tio reveals the Granasaber as a ship, teleporting the group inside and guiding the giant sword back to St. Heim.

The "Day of Darkness" arrives, and the group witnesses the Cathedral Knights slaughtering the townsfolk. They fight their way to the cathedral, where Elena reveals her true mission: to absorb the pieces of Valmar so the Granasaber can destroy them. Selene reappears and transforms into the Heart of Valmar, but the group destroys it. They catch up to Zera, who reveals that Valmar was victorious in the battle against Granas, who was killed. He actually plans to use the absorbed pieces within Elena to bring Valmar back to life, and abducts her to the Moon of Valmar.

The group uses the Granasaber to reach the moon and save Elena. A wounded Mareg later sacrifices himself to allow the group to escape from the moon. Crashing near Cyrum, now besieged by monsters from the moon, the group rejoins with Roan and defends the town. Soon, Valmar's Moon crashes into the Granas Cathedral, and the new Valmar emerges. Unfortunately, the group finds itself without the means to defeat him. Roan suggests traveling to the nearby Birthplace of the Gods for answers, which reveals much about the ancient war and the origins of both gods.

Meeting another Automata named Elmo, Ryudo chooses to confront the Horns within and is beset by many trials. However, he overcomes his fears and insecurities and is granted the true Granasaber. The party challenges Valmar and enters his body. Inside, they are confronted by Zera, who attacks them before sending a false Millenia after them. Ryudo's party is victorious, and the true Millenia, now separated from Elena, joins them. Zera divides the group and launches a final attack against Ryudo, Elena, and Millenia. They defeat him and destroy Valmar for good, restoring peace to the world.

The ending shows the different characters one year after Valmar's defeat. Roan is still king and embarks on a journey to find his friends. Tio has become a nurse in Cyrum, Millenia is a teacher, and Elena tours the world as a singer in a troupe. In the last scene, Ryudo says goodbye to Granasaber and buries it under a tree in a remote area. He concludes that humanity will care for themselves and no longer depend on gods to continue living.

== Characters ==
=== Playable characters ===
- Ryudo: The main hero of the story. Ryudo is a Geohound, a mercenary. He is skilled with a sword and shows a sharp wit. He cares little for others besides himself at first; however, his attitude changes, and he eventually wishes for a better world.
- Elena: The main heroine of the story. She is a Sister of the Church of Granas and a Songstress. She joins Ryudo early on in the adventure and is typically naive about most things about the world. She wields strong healing and divine magic and uses a mace/staff as her weapon.
- Millenia: A mysterious woman who meets Ryudo early on after the failed ceremony at Garmia Tower. Revealed to be the "Wings of Valmar", Millenia appears to be a rather blunt, hot-tempered woman who initially uses Ryudo to accomplish her goals but eventually falls in love with him. She uses a crossbow and absorbs pieces of Valmar to gain dark powers.
- Roan: A boy that Ryudo meets in Agear town who requests help finding his lost medal. He joins Ryudo's party until it is revealed he is the prince of Cyrum kingdom, whose people served Valmar during the "Battle between Good and Evil". He eventually becomes the king, but later rejoins the party. He uses daggers/knives as his weapon.
- Mareg: A beast man who initially attacks Ryudo, mistaking him for his brother, before joining him on his journey. He teaches Tio about what it means to be alive. He is strong and uses an axe/spear as his weapon.
- Tio: An Automata housed under Cyrum kingdom. She is awakened by Ryudo's group and joins them, as she has no other function. She calls Mareg "Master" but eventually considers everyone a family. She uses chakrams as her weapon.

=== Non-playable characters ===
- Valmar: The God of Darkness. Destroyed, broken into pieces, and sealed after the Battle of Good and Evil. But the pieces are being released, and his revival is apparent.
- Melfice: An evil swordsman whom Mareg is valiantly pursuing, he is Ryudo's brother. His strength is unholy, thanks to the Horns of Valmar within him.
- His Holiness Zera: The Pope of Granas Cathedral and its leader. He sees the evil in the world and vows to defeat it at any cost.
- Selene: The High Priestess of Granas, she follows Zera's leadership without question. Her zealousness is unquestionable.
- Skye: Ryudo's trusty bird companion. He's just as snarky and quick-witted as Ryudo but more mature and full of wisdom.
- Granas: The God of Light. Responsible for the destruction of Valmar and the sealing of his pieces.

== Ports ==
Grandia II was ported to PlayStation 2 and PC after its initial release on Dreamcast. In the PlayStation 2 version, some textures and characters are less graphically detailed than in the Dreamcast version. Also, there is a tendency for graphical glitches and slow down to occur in areas with heavy graphic data. For instance, when a party member defeats the last enemy standing while using the weapon or accessory Warp effect, the character's color scheme vanishes, and only a bright white model is left.

On the PC port, there is a glitch in the first fight with Millenia. Several video files on the disc contain extra frames appearing as a freeze after casting specific spells.

On May 11, 2015, GungHo America president Jun Iwasaki revealed to GameSpot that Grandia II will be receiving an HD remaster on Steam and GOG.com. Based on the Dreamcast version of the game, the port will have a mouse, keyboard, and gamepad support. Along with the visual definition upgrade, it will include Steam achievements and Trading Cards. On August 24, 2015, Grandia II Anniversary Edition for PC was released and features visual upgrades to textures / lighting / shadows, original Japanese voice option, additional difficulty level, gamepad support, Steam Trading Cards / Steam Achievements / Steam Cloud Save support (PC only), selectable video options, remappable keyboard & gamepad support, 100 save file slots, Dreamcast VMS Save File Support.

The game received a remastered version on the Nintendo Switch as part of the Grandia HD Collection on August 16, 2019. Grandia II Anniversary Edition was updated with new features and renamed to Grandia II HD Remaster on October 15, 2019; customers who already own the Grandia II Anniversary Edition received the upgraded version for free. Changes in the remaster include enhanced details to UI / sprites / texture art, visual enhancements to original cinematic videos, widescreen support and customizable resolutions (PC only), Japanese and English audio, and additional French and German localization. The remaster was released in Japan and received Japanese language support in other regions, along with various fixes, on March 25, 2020.

== Reception ==
=== Dreamcast version ===
Reception (Dreamcast)

Aggregate scores
Aggregator	Score
GameRankings	89%
Metacritic	90/100

Review scores
Publication	Score
Electronic Gaming Monthly	9/10, 9/10, 9/10
Eurogamer	8/10
Famitsu	35/40
Game Informer	8/10
GamePro	5/5
GameRevolution	A−
GameSpot	8.5/10 (UK); 7.9/10 (US)
IGN	9.2/10
Next Generation	4/5
Consoles +	95%
Dreamcast Magazine	29/30

The original Dreamcast release of Grandia II received a largely positive response during its initial release in Japan, earning a 9.75 out of 10 rating from Dreamcast Magazine, as well as a 35 out of 40 from Weekly Famitsu, which earned it the magazine's editor's choice Platinum award. Famitsu DC rated the game 26 out of 30 based on three reviews. Despite good reception, sales of the game remained relatively low in the region, with an estimated 184,863 copies sold.

Grandia II's English release met with an overwhelmingly positive response. It received an aggregate score of 88.81% on GameRankings and 90/100 on Metacritic. GamePro magazine found the game to be "solidly-built and features stunning visuals, dead-on controls, and a innovative combat system" yet remarked that that game's scenarios seemed too linear at times.

On a similar note, GameSpot stated that "while the first Grandia had lengthy dungeons full of puzzles and side routes, Grandia II's dungeons are more compartmental and linear affairs", the game was ultimately "a solid RPG ... even if it isn't as deep or difficult as the original." IGN granted the game an Editor's Choice distinction, calling it a "classic" of the Dreamcast and remarking that its battle system was "arguably the most advanced system in play today", yet found the game's story and character development to be cliche and predictable.

Eurogamer also found the game's story and gameplay to be largely methodical, and despite being dubbed "the best RPG on the Dreamcast in Europe" and "strongly recommended", editors felt seasoned role-playing game players would find the game too generic, calling it "an incredibly tough game to call". The three reviewers in Electronic Gaming Monthly all complimented the graphics of the game, while finding battles a bit too easy.

Francesca Reyes reviewed the Dreamcast version of the game for Next Generation, rating it four stars out of five, and called the game "a winner in the RPG beauty pageant that's just clever enough in the battle department to balance out an almost too straightforward storyline."

In a retrospective on the Dreamcast library, Spanish magazine Hobby Consolas described Grandia II as a classic that had influenced a generation of players, highlighting its innovative combat system as one of its distinguishing features. In a 2017 retrospective, French publication Jeuxvideo.com ranked Grandia II among its ten best Dreamcast games. Although noting that the European version was entirely in English, the publication praised its presentation and highlighted the battle system's action gauge as an innovative tactical feature.

=== PlayStation 2 and PC ports ===
Reception (Ports)

Aggregate scores
Aggregator	Score	
Aggregator	PC	PS2
GameRankings	78%	73%
Metacritic	70/100	71/100

Review scores
Publication	Score	
Publication	PC	PS2
Electronic Gaming Monthly		4/10
Famitsu		29/40
Game Informer		6.5/10
GamePro		4/5
GameSpot	7.5/10	7.4/10
GameZone		8.25/10
IGN	7.9/10	7/10
RPGFan	83%	90%

The PlayStation 2 rerelease of Grandia II in 2002 experienced lower sales than the Dreamcast version in Japan despite a higher install base, selling approximately 42,060 copies in its first month. In North America and Europe, the game received chiefly lower reviews than the original, with many publications remarking on the technical shortcomings of the port to the new console. Electronic Gaming Monthly found the PlayStation version to be vastly inferior to the original, citing reduced frame rate, color, and texture quality, adding that its "Inexplicably horrible graphics completely ruin an otherwise splendid title."

GamePro found the conversion shortcomings to be essentially negligible, claiming that Grandia II "still holds its own as a solidly constructed but direct port in the more crowded PlayStation 2 fantasy camp" while asserting that it was still "overshadowed by Final Fantasy X." IGN still regarded the PlayStation 2 version as "a good game" and one of the top role-playing games for the system at the time but remarked that the "time and stress of transition" as well as the emergence of other prominent games during the one-year time frame had diluted the port's appeal. GameSpot called the Dreamcast release "technically superior", but the new version was recommended to those who did not play the original and that it was still "well worth playing".

Like the PlayStation 2 version, the PC release of Grandia II had a much milder response from critics than the Dreamcast version. Critiquing the game from a PC game standpoint, IGN PC stated, "This game is not like a PC RPG. It's light. It's fluffy. It's colorful. It's not exactly deep. Its storyline is console stereotypical. Its jokes are silly. Its gameplay is cartoony. And the characters all have huge eyes and no mouths." But the reviewer added that Grandia II "still manages to be fun, maybe even just because it's so different than most of the dark, dreary and serious RPGs that find their ways to our favorite platform."

Similarly, GameSpot found that the game would be difficult for consumers accustomed to Western role-playing video games to get into, remarking that "Grandia II's linear gameplay, 'young adult' sensibility, and anime artwork aren't likely to impress someone looking for another Baldur's Gate II. Still, Grandia II can be fun if you're used to Japanese RPGs to begin with or if you approach it with an open mind."
