= Grandia Xtreme =

2002 video game

- North American cover art
- Developer: Game Arts
- Publishers: Enix (retail); Square Enix (PSN)
- Artist: Kamui Fujiwara
- Composer: Noriyuki Iwadare
- Series: Grandia
- Platform: PlayStation 2
- Release: JP: January 31, 2002; NA: September 30, 2002
- Genre: Role-playing
- Mode: Single-player

Grandia Xtreme (グランディア エクストリーム, Gurandeia Ekusutorīmu) is a role-playing video game developed by Game Arts and published by Enix for the PlayStation 2 video game console in January 2002. The game is part of the Grandia series. It was released by publisher Square Enix for PlayStation Network in Japan on December 17, 2014.

== Gameplay ==
Grandia Xtreme plays very similarly to the rest of the games in the Grandia series, which are traditional role-playing video games with battles that occur within dungeons or during scripted situations. Combat takes place on a three-dimensional battlefield where the characters move around, striking enemies as they get near them. The Battle Gauge displays icons representing characters and enemies currently in battle. The icons move along the Battle Gauge at a rate which corresponds to their "speed" rating. Once an icon reaches the top of the circle, the character is allowed to either attack, use items, defend, or flee the battle.

Players progress by going through dungeons and completing puzzle-based problems. "Geo Gates" transport the player back to the city, the only place with a save point in the armory. Some gates are one-way, and can only be used to return to Locca, not leaving an opportunity to return. After using these gates, players are required to begin the dungeon again.

== Plot and setting ==
The fictional world of Grandia Xtreme is populated by three races: the militaristic and resourceful Humans; the pointy-eared Arcadians, characterized by their magic; and the tribal, beast-like Hazmans. At the beginning of the game, the three races have co-existed in an uneasy alliance for several years, but a natural disaster known as the "Elemental Disorder" occurs and threatens them. In response, the Humans focus their Nortis Army into researching the cause of the disturbances. Representatives from the other races gather to help but tensions and distrust arise along with the possibility of the disasters having been created artificially.

The player takes on the role of Evann, a young ranger who can activate the technology present in certain ruins of the world. He has trained himself to use a sword after his father's death, but has not developed a proper work ethic. Evann is thrown into a series of events that will lead him to discover the cause of the Elemental Disorder, the military's real intentions, and hidden truths behind the ruins.

Seven characters join Evann as playable characters: Carmyne, a sergeant of the Nortis Army who fights with a saber and dislikes taking orders, but revels in giving them; Brandol, a brave but gentle soldier who wields a long sword and has a knack for engineering; Myam, a young and impulsive archer from Hazma; Lutina, a cold-blooded, experienced officer from Arcadia fighting with a dagger; Ulk, an aged Hazman wielding an axe and working with the Nortis Army; Titto, a young and timid Arcadian knife-user only comfortable around Jaid; and Jaid himself, an arrogant staff-wielding knight from Arcadia. All eight characters are eventually led to combine their forces in an attempt to put an end to the problems facing their world.

== Development ==
A new installment in the Grandia series developed by Game Arts was officially announced on June 1, 2001 with the tentative name of Grandia X. The game, later retitled Grandia Xtreme, was to be published by Enix as they had just invested capital in Game Arts for a total of ¥99.2 million, or 15% of the company. The game was the first title Game Arts developed exclusively for the PlayStation 2. While previous installments in the series were traditional role-playing video games, the developers took the new title in a different direction and designed it more as an action role-playing game or dungeon crawler to make it more accessible to casual gamers. They nevertheless kept and enhanced mainstays such as the combat and magic systems, as well as the "enchantment" aspect of the story. To design the characters of the game, Enix and Game Arts selected Kamui Fujiwara, the character designer of Terranigma. Development for the game spanned roughly 18 months.

An "aggressive" marketing campaign was planned to push the game and the series as a "brand for the future, not a one shot deal". Grandia Xtreme was showcased with a trailer at the Tokyo Game Show in August 2001 and in playable form at the World Hobby Fair of Tokyo in January 2002. A video of the game was also featured in an issue of Famitsu Game Wave DVD. The game was released in Japan on January 31, 2002 in either regular or limited edition, the latter including as bonuses a Grandia Xtreme pocket watch and a small "Geo Gate" diorama depicting the protagonist Evann. Customers who pre-ordered the game also received a Grandia miniature tote bag.

The voice acting for the English-language version was directed by WorldLink Technologies in Seattle, Washington, with large involvement from Enix America. Mark Hamill voiced the antagonist Colonel Kroitz, while Dean Cain did Evann and Lisa Loeb did Lutina. The North American version was showcased at the E3 in Los Angeles, California in May 2002, and was released on September 30, 2002. Enix America partnered with Versus Books to publish a strategy guide of the game and "expan[d] awareness of the franchise". The company also partnered with gaming website RPGFan for a quiz contest to win free copies of the game and strategy guide.

== Music ==
The score of the game was composed by Noriyuki Iwadare in about half a year, with a focus on battle and dungeon music and an overall theme of friendship. The composer used the looped streaming ADX format as in previous Grandia titles and had no technical issues working with the PlayStation 2 hardware. However, he was perplexed at first due to not being specialized in the militaristic aspects of the game's plot; in particular, he had difficulties completing the opening "Theme of Xtreme", and could not find any inspiration for it for two months. After getting advice from one of the development staff member and realizing the game is "still 'Grandia', after all", Iwadare managed to compose the track. He tried to imbue it with a feeling of camaraderie and to make it a "song of support for everyone who [would hear] it". The track "Quan Li" was composed with the same melodic motif as the ending theme, but with the sharp note omitted to musically convey the wrongness associated with "causing pain and spilling blood in the name of a Holy War", as witnessed in the plot of the game. Iwadare felt that giving people the chance to contemplate this was what he was most proud of concerning the score. The ending theme was further based on the feeling of love for mankind.

The soundtrack for the game was published in Japan by Two Five Records on March 1, 2002. In place of the game's ending theme, the album features its vocal arrangement, "Rein-car-nation", sung in Japanese by Kaori Kawasumi. One of the battle themes of the game, "Combat 2", was not included on the album as Iwadare thought it was not one of his favorites and felt it was not perfect. He stated that if a second volume of the album is ever released, he would agree to include the track.

Grandia Xtreme Original Soundtracks track listing
No.	Title	Length
1.	"Theme of Xtreme"	2:56
2.	"Rokka" (ロッカ)	4:11
3.	"Escarle" (エスカーレ)	4:10
4.	"Upper Class" (上流階級)	2:54
5.	"Jolly Life!"	1:18
6.	"Good Meal!!"	3:04
7.	"Spirits Run Wild" (精霊暴走)	2:23
8.	"The Mole's Nest" (土竜の巣)	4:28
9.	"Eye of the Firestorm" (炎雲の目)	2:47
10.	"Combat 1"	3:52
11.	"Source of the Waves" (波頭の源)	4:09
12.	"Top of the Tailwind" (逆風の頂)	3:30
13.	"Combat 3"	4:08
14.	"Illusory Grasslands" (幻想の草原)	2:42
15.	"Dark Ruins" (闇遺跡)	2:53
16.	"Kroitz" (グロイツ)	3:45
17.	"Combat 4"	3:52
18.	"Crack in the Earth" (大地の裂け目)	4:26
19.	"Quan Li" (クァン・リー)	3:26
20.	"Combat 5 -Last Battle-"	5:01
21.	"Rein-car-nation" (sung by Kaori Kawasumi)	4:43
Total length:		74:38

== Reception ==
Reception

Aggregate scores
Aggregator	Score
GameRankings	71.12%
Metacritic	68/100

Review scores
Publication	Score
Famitsu	33/40
GameSpot	6.2/10
IGN	7.5/10

Award
Publication	Award
IGN	7th "Most Challenging PS2 Game of All Time"

Grandia Xtreme received mixed reviews from critics. It received a score of 71.12% on GameRankings and 68/100 on Metacritic.
