= Grandia =

Video game series

- Genre: Role-playing
- Developer: Game Arts
- Publishers: Entertainment Software Publishing (1997–1999); Sony Computer Entertainment (1999); Ubisoft (1999–2002); Hudson Soft (2000); Enix/Square Enix (2002–2006); GungHo Online Entertainment (2009–present)
- Platforms: Sega Saturn, PlayStation, Dreamcast, Game Boy Color, PlayStation 2, Microsoft Windows, PlayStation 3, Nintendo Switch, PlayStation 4, Xbox One
- First release: Grandia; December 18, 1997
- Latest release: Grandia HD Collection; August 16, 2019

Grandia (グランディア, Gurandia) is a series of role-playing video games developed by Game Arts and published over the years by Entertainment Software Publishing, Sony Computer Entertainment, Ubisoft, Hudson Soft, Enix, Square Enix and GungHo Online Entertainment. Games in the Grandia series have been released for the Sega Saturn, PlayStation, Dreamcast, Game Boy Color, PlayStation 2, PlayStation 3, Nintendo Switch and Microsoft Windows.

The Grandia HD Collection (compiling the first two games in the series) was released for the Nintendo Switch in North America and Europe on August 16, 2019. The games were released in Japan on March 25, 2020. Grandia HD Remaster for the PC was released on October 15, 2019. On the same day, Grandia II Anniversary Edition for the PC, which was originally released on August 24, 2015, received further improvement updates and was renamed Grandia II HD Remaster. Full Japanese language support along with various fixes were released for Grandia HD Remaster and Grandia II HD Remaster on March 25, 2020.

The Grandia series sold 2 million units, as of April 2009. The latest original installment was released for Microsoft Windows in July 2009, entitled Grandia Online; it remained online for three years until it was shut down in September 2012.

== Games ==
Aggregate review scores As of March 18, 2014.
Game	GameRankings	Metacritic
Grandia	(SS) 87% (PS) 86%	(PS) 89
Grandia II	(DC) 89% (PC) 73% (PS2) 73%	(DC) 90 (PS2) 71 (PC) 70
Grandia Xtreme	(PS2) 71%	(PS2) 68
Grandia III	(PS2) 79%	(PS2) 77

=== Grandia (1997) ===
Grandia's story focuses around Justin, a young boy who desires to be a great adventurer. While investigating a ruin of the lost Angelou Civilization, he hears a mysterious request to come east and find out the secret of why these ancients mysteriously disappeared. The resulting adventure takes Justin across the sea to new continents, and even beyond the known end of the world. Graphically, the game used character sprites in a 3D world, rather than polygonal character models that later came to favor. The battle system, like Game Arts' Lunar series before it, placed emphasis on the combatants' location in the field. However, while Lunar only allowed the player to set the team's position in battle, Grandia had characters move to appropriate positions during battle and allowed the player to have them move elsewhere to avoid attacks or reach a more advantageous position. Also notable is how characters can counter or disrupt enemy attacks.

Grandia was remastered by GungHo Online Entertainment in August 2019 in North America and March 2020 in Japan for Steam and Nintendo Switch as part of the Grandia HD Collection alongside Grandia II. It featured upgraded visuals and widescreen, as well as achievements and trading cards on Steam.

=== Grandia: Digital Museum (1998) ===
A bonus disc using the same engine as the Saturn version of Grandia. Though it only consists of four dungeons, each one is very large compared to the ones in the original Grandia. Justin, Feena and Sue must explore them in order to recover artifacts from a museum of the original game that Liete has created. These unlock storyboards, special sound plays known as "Radio Dramas", saves for the original Saturn game, mini-games, bestiary listings and original artwork.

=== Grandia II (2000) ===
Grandia II's story focuses around Ryudo, a sarcastic "Geohound" (mercenaries who take undesirable jobs). He receives a mission to guard a sister of Granas, Elena, during a rite to reseal an ancient evil god. However, the rite runs into difficulties, leading to a much longer quest to escort Elena across the continent to meet Pope Zera, leader of the Church of Granas. The failed sealing attempt is also tied into the emergence of a strange woman known as Millenia, and a series of disturbing events at towns along the way to the Granas Cathedral. This sequel used a new, fully 3D engine to seamlessly render landscapes and battle scenes. The core battle system functionality stayed the same between Grandia and Grandia II, although it became impossible to cancel an action merely with normal attacks. The magic system has also been changed, whereby magical eggs (usable by any character) are used to cast magic rather than having spells linked directly to each character.

Grandia II was remastered by GungHo Online Entertainment in 2015 for Steam and GOG Galaxy. It featured upgraded visuals, achievements, trading cards (Steam), a Japanese voice option, and a hard difficulty. It, alongside the original Grandia was released for Nintendo Switch as part of the Grandia HD Collection in August 2019 in North America and March 2020 in Japan, and was rebranded on Steam as Grandia II HD Remaster.

=== Grandia: Parallel Trippers (2000) ===
Uses the same characters and music as the first Grandia game. The actual game areas are different from those of the original Grandia, though many of the items, moves and enemy names are the same. A group of schoolchildren who live in the "real" world are sucked into a portal while playing in an abandoned shed next to their school and end up in the world of Grandia. They must find three special keys in order to make their way back home, and enlist the help of Justin and friends, who are always keen for new adventures.

=== Grandia Xtreme (2002) ===
This incarnation of the Grandia series is considerably more battle-focused than the earlier games. The main character is a Ranger known as Evann recruited by the army to help neutralise the so-called Elemental Disorder, which has been causing havoc. A much improved Grandia II battle engine is used in Xtreme, and various other features were added to the game outside of combat to give it more the feel of a "dungeon crawler" such as Diablo. Rather than having a party decided by the plot as in previous Grandia games, Xtreme gives the player 8 characters from which the player is free to choose his preferred team. Graphics are much improved on Grandia II — the battling is quick and fluid, and loading times everywhere in the game are some of the fastest in any PlayStation 2 game. Battles are also more large-scale than any past Grandia game, with often over 15 combatants at one time. The character empowerment system is somewhat a mix of Grandia and Grandia II, with techniques being learned and upgraded through use, but skills and magic being found and equipped. The game has been criticized for having a weaker story, relatively uninteresting characters and only two towns, which is a large change from past Grandia games which focused on story and travel.

=== Grandia III (2005) ===
Grandia III's story focuses around Yuki, a flight enthusiast who has experienced some difficulty in getting his planes to fly. His latest project flew him into a situation in which he saved a girl named Alfina from a group of menacing pursuers. He and his mother, Miranda, agree to escort Alfina safely back to her home in Arcriff Temple, where she serves as a communicator between humans and a group of powerful creatures known as Guardians. However, once at Arcriff, Yuki and Alfina discover that the lives of the Guardians are being threatened by Alfina's brother, Emelious, who is working to restore an evil being named Xorn to power.

=== Grandia Online (2009) ===
A MMORPG that ran from 2009 to 2012.
