= Kalydo =

Cloud gaming technology and service

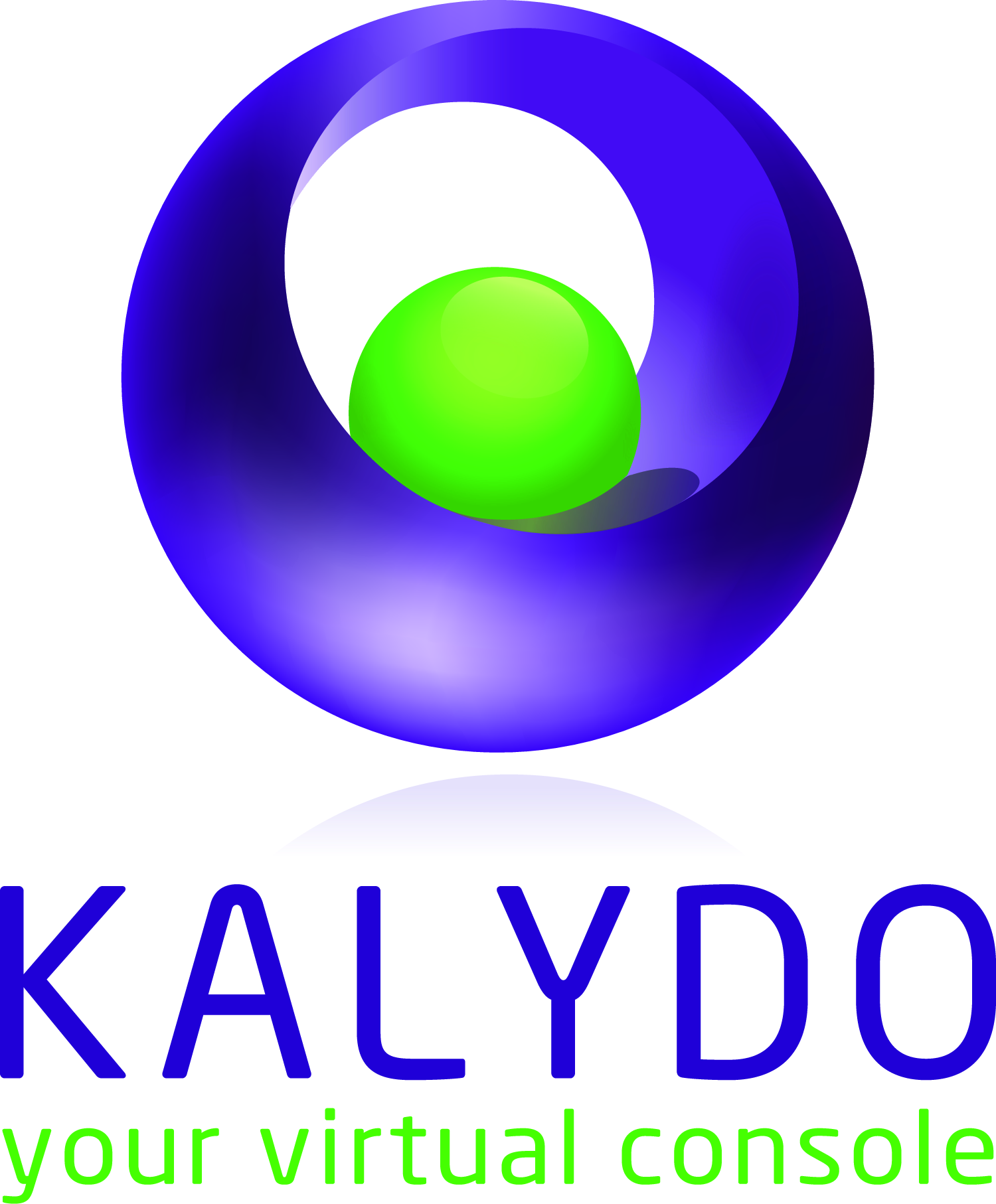
- Company type: Private
- Industry: Cloud computing
- Founded: Eindhoven (2006)
- Founder: Doki Tops, Mark Schroders, Rob van Gulik, Chris van der Linden
- Headquarters: Eindhoven, Netherlands
- Area served: Worldwide
- Products: Kalydo
- Services: Cloud gaming service
- Website: kalydo.com

Kalydo is a proprietary cloud gaming technology and service based on file streaming. The Kalydo platform launched commercially in 2008 and has been in service since. The Kalydo file streaming technology allows games to be played immediately, without the need of downloading and installation, providing faster and easier access to games. Games running on Kalydo do so via the proprietary Kalydo Player plugin and can run in a browser, or from the PC desktop.

Many games that have been launched using Kalydo are subsequently serviced through social networks and game portals such as Facebook, Kongregate and Miniclip.

Kalydo made its service readily available to "developers of every size" on July 9, 2013 by introducing a low entry pricing structure and one-month try before you buy period.

== History ==
The Kalydo platform launched in 2008, initially under a beta flag. Shortly after the service went commercially live. One of the first titles to launch on the Kalydo service was sports game OnGolf and HovoRun, the latter was cancelled by the game's publisher before going live.

In years to follow an increasing number of titles launched on Kalydo including Godswar by IGG, Requiem by Gravity, Runes of Magic by Frogster and Formula Cartoon by Cartoon Network.

Some game titles have since been discontinued by the publisher, while others remain active through Kalydo.

== Technology ==
The proprietary Kalydo cloud gaming technology and service is available to developers and publishers worldwide. Kalydo is a collection of tools (SDK), plugin and online service to create, launch, maintain and monitor games throughout its entire life cycle.

Kalydo offers a free trial period to developers, during which full access is granted to the tools, platform and customer service.

=== Kalydo Player ===
The Kalydo cloud gaming technology is based on file streaming, through a small proprietary plugin called the Kalydo Player (2.5 mb size) which is installed once on the end user's PC. The Kalydo Player handles various tasks such requesting data before and during play and authentication. When an end user plays a Kalydo powered game, the Kalydo Player requests and downloads the first game data needed to start playing. During play, remaining game content is downloaded dynamically. Using advanced methods of progressive downloading, data compression and prediction algorithms, Kalydo is able to provide a smooth game play experience.

The data downloaded by the Kalydo Player is stored locally (cached) on the computer's hard drive. This way, the next time an end user plays the game, the same data does not have to be downloaded again. Games played through Kalydo are also added to the Windows Program Files list, where they can be uninstalled like a regular application.

=== File streaming ===
Cloud gaming technologies are generally based on file streaming or pixel streaming. Kalydo's technology is based on file streaming which has a low bandwidth requirement to operate and is less sensitive to problems associated with pixel streaming such as lag and the need of a high speed internet connection. The cloud is used to provide a highly scalable infrastructure to stream the game content and handle big data processing.

== International availability ==
Kalydo is available worldwide, including low bandwidth countries such as Malaysia, Philippines and Thailand. Kalydo's service is based on cloud gaming through file streaming, which makes it possible to operate on a low speed internet connection.

== Games using Kalydo ==
- Remnant Knights (2013 GameSamba-game discontinued)
- Last Chaos (2012 Gamigo)
- Formula Cartoon (2012 Cartoon Network-game discontinued)
- Soul Captor (2012 Gamania - game discontinued)
- Runes of Magic (Released 24 April 2012) Developer: Runewaker Publisher: Frogster Interactive
- Requiem (Beta, 24 April 2012)
- Nostale (2012 Gameforge - game discontinued)
- Emil Chronicle Online (2012 - Gungho)
- Crazy Car (2011 ChiYu games )
- Conquer Online (2011 - Netdragon)
- 4Story (2011 - Gameforge)
- GodsWar Online IGG (Facebook version)
- onGOLF by ColdWood Interactive
