= Puzzle & Dragons =

2012 puzzle video game

- Developer: GungHo Online Entertainment
- Publisher: GungHo Online Entertainment
- Directors: Koji Yamamoto; Shinichi Kudo; Kenji Yamanaka; Kota Kawahara
- Producer: Daisuke Yamamoto
- Designer: Masato Takano
- Composers: Kenji Ito; Yukio Nakajima
- Series: Puzzle & Dragons
- Platforms: iOS, iPadOS, Android, Kindle Fire
- Release: iOS; JP: February 20, 2012; NA: November 8, 2012; EU: October 9, 2013; Android; JP: September 18, 2012; NA: December 12, 2012; Amazon Fire; JP: January 11, 2013; NA: June 23, 2014
- Genres: Puzzle, role-playing

Puzzle & Dragons (パズル&ドラゴンズ, Pazuru Ando Doragonzu) is a 2012 puzzle video game with role-playing and strategy elements, developed and published by GungHo Online Entertainment for the iOS, Android, and Amazon Fire platforms.

Puzzle & Dragons is a match-three puzzle game, requiring players to move and match colored orbs arranged in a grid. The amount and type of matches determine which of the six monsters on the player's team attack the waves of enemy monsters and how much damage they do. An additional layer of challenge is the acquisition, selection, and improvement of a team of monsters from among thousands ranging from standard fantasy fare, to deities from several religions and mythologies and characters from popular entertainment franchises.

The game is free-to-play and financed by the sale of in-game currency. It is a commercial success in Japan, where it was downloaded 32 million times by November 2014, and was released in other Asian countries as well as in North America and many European countries. Total worldwide downloads surpassed 50 million by September 2015, and 62 million by October 2017. Puzzle & Dragons is the first mobile game in history to gross $1 billion in revenue, eventually grossing $6 billion by the end of 2017. It was the highest-grossing mobile app of all time up until it was surpassed by Monster Strike in October 2018. Puzzle & Dragons has grossed $7 billion, and is the second-highest-grossing mobile app of all time, as of October 2018. The game has spawned a franchise consisting of several video games as well as an anime series, Puzzle & Dragons X. Another series, Puzzle & Dragons, premiered on April 2, 2018, and consists of 339 episodes as of December 29, 2024.

== Gameplay ==
Puzzle & Dragons is a combination of two types of gameplay: tile matching and a monster collecting RPG. Players create teams by picking from the over 9000 different monsters they can acquire within the game and then play dungeons where they solve a tile-matching puzzle that determines how powerful their monsters' attacks are on waves of enemy monsters.

=== Monsters ===
The monsters in Puzzle & Dragons are drawn from many origins. Their designs range from fantasy creatures such as dragons, demons, ogres, and goblins, to monsters based on deities and other figures of various mythologies around the world; also included are third party fictional characters available for limited periods of time. Players collect these monsters as rewards for completing the game's dungeons or spending in-game currency (either won through gameplay or purchased through microtransactions) at the "Egg Machines".

The various statistics different monsters possess add to the strategic nature of the game. One monster on the team is designated as the "Leader", and will have a passive leader skill that affects either the offensive or defensive abilities of the player's team throughout play in a dungeon. In addition, nearly all monsters also possess active skills that the player can use to their advantage in play, but these possess a cooldown timer, which requires the player to take several turns before being able to use the skill. During play, the player also picks a monster from other players to add to their party. Prior to version 7.4.1, only the player's friends would have their leader skill activated and "adventurers" could only be chosen to possibly become friends after; version 7.4.1 makes the "adventurer" players' monsters have leader skills active as well. Players are limited to what monsters they can use on their teams based on their rank and the monster's associated team cost which is based on the monster's rarity and strength. When the player increases his or her player rank through completing dungeons and earning experience points, the total team cost is increased, as well. Players can save multiple teams to use in the game, starting out at six possible combinations to set up. Teams can be tailored to defeat a particular dungeon, or be set up to best utilize the team's leader skill.

Monsters are made more powerful through fusing them with others, which increases the selected monster's experience. If the two monsters possess the same skill, there is a chance that the base monster's skill level will be increased, which will lower the skill's cooldown counter permanently. Certain monsters won in the game also are marked with a plus (+) sign and a number, which indicates that they have a statistic that is increased in comparison to identical monsters; using these monsters in fusion passes on the increased statistic to the base monster. Once a monster reaches a set maximum level, the monster can be evolved, so long as the player possesses other monsters required for that particular monster's evolution. Evolution resets the monster's level back to 1, but it also allows for the monster's statistics to be increased through leveling once more. An "Ultimate Evolution" mechanic was added to the game in its update to version 4.0, which can change a monster's various statistics around, changing how that monster can be used strategically in dungeons. The update to version 6.0 added the Awoken Skill system, adding additional passive skills that all monsters on a team have active in dungeon play.

=== Puzzles ===
The puzzle aspect of Puzzle & Dragons. Two enemy monsters are shown on the top half inside of the dungeon, the player's team of six monsters and current health in the center area, and the orb tiles to be matched in the bottom.

The puzzle system in Puzzle & Dragons is found within the game's dungeons, where the play of a tile-matching puzzle determines the strength of the player's monsters' attacks. Dungeons consist of certain numbers of waves of enemy monsters, each with their own offensive and defensive statistics. The player must clear all of the dungeon's floors without having their team's collective HP drop to zero. The game screen is split, with the enemy monsters appearing on the top half of the screen, and a 6-by-5 tile grid appearing on the bottom, divided by the player's own team of monsters.

Dungeon encounters are played out in a turn-based style. The player's turn consists of activating any skills from the monsters on their team if they are available, and then attempting to make a match (or "combo") of three or more tiles (or "orbs") on the board. The orbs are of the five colors representing the elemental attributes of the monsters (Fire, Wood, Water, Light, and Dark) as well as hearts that represent life recovery (certain enemy monster skills may introduce other types of orbs to the board). The player drags an orb to adjacent positions, swapping with the orb already there. So long as the player does not let go of the orb, the player can move the orb as much as necessary within 5 seconds (which can be increased or decreased depending on the player's monsters or the enemy's skills) allowing them to arrange for several combos in a single turn. After completing this, all matched orbs are removed from the board and accounted for as damage. The board then cascades all orbs down and fills the board up once more; this may result in more combos, known as "skyfall combos" (落ちコン, ochikon).

Damage is based on what colors were matched in the combos: for example, a basic combo of 3 red (Fire) orbs will have any player monster that is Fire attribute deal its damage equal to its base attack stat (ATK) to one creature. When heart orbs are matched in a combo, this restores health to the team based on the team's total health recovery stat (RCV). Combos of more than 3 orbs of the same color will increase the damage dealt for each additional orb. Making multiple combos in the same turn will boost all damage or healing for all monsters regardless of colors matched, while separate combos of the same color further multiply the damage dealt. Single combos of five or more orbs will activate an attack that hits all enemy monsters on the field. Certain Leader or Awoken Skills may also change damage dealt, so long as the particular parameters are met. Damage is dealt to a single monster, generally determined by the game as the best attack. Damage will be affected by both the opposing monsters' defense statistic and its elemental attribute, so fire damage against an opposing fire monster will work, but will be boosted against a wood monster and decreased against a water monster, and so forth in a rock-paper-scissors relationship; light and dark monsters are solely weak to the other type. The player can force damage to go against a specific monster by tapping it on the screen. After the player finishes their turn, a counter on each of the enemy monsters drops by one. If one of these counters gets to zero, that monster is given a turn to attack, and the counter resets to a predefined value. If a player does not end a turn on a successful match, the enemy monsters' attack counter advances once while any cool down timers for the player do not change (statuses imposed by enemy monsters are affected, though).

When an enemy monster's HP drops to zero, the monster drops out from battle, and there is a chance that it will leave a monster egg or treasure chest behind that will be part of the dungeon's reward. Once all monsters in an encounter are defeated, the player moves to the next encounter until reaching the boss encounter for that floor. Once the boss is defeated, the player earns the various rewards earned throughout the dungeon. If the player's team's HP drops to zero, they have the option to use in-game currency to continue from where they just lost, refilling their HP and resetting the entire board, or to abandon the dungeon and forego any gains from it. Completing a dungeon earns the player experience, as well as in-game currency and any monster eggs that were obtained through the encounters. Once all of the floors in a dungeon are completed, the next dungeon is unlocked.

=== Dungeons ===
The game features several types of dungeons that the player chooses to participate in. All dungeons have an associated Stamina cost, which is based on the player's rank in the game; this cost is scaled to the dungeon's difficulty, and if the player does not have enough stamina, they must wait until it is restored in real time or use an in-game currency to restore it. At the start, only the Normal Dungeons are available to the player. Enemy monsters in these dungeons will only ever cause standard damage during gameplay. After successful completion of a series of the Normal Dungeons, the Technical Dungeons (added in version 3.0) are unlocked. Technical Dungeons are more difficult, as enemy monsters now possess their own skills to increase their damage output or change the player's board by changing colors, obscuring the view, or adding the block and poison orbs that are unique to enemy monster skills. Some Technical Dungeons also impose restrictions on the player, such as restricting what monsters the player can use or deactivating all monsters' passive skills. After successfully clearing a series of the Technical Dungeons, a new "Challenge Mode" is unlocked, where the player creates a team from friends' monsters, relying on only their own monster's leader skill.

Also in play are Special Dungeons, which have limited periods of availability and often feature the strongest and rarest monsters in the game. Special Dungeons have their own separate difficulty scaling; the rarer monsters are less likely to be won from the easier difficulty dungeons, whereas completion of the highest difficulty ranking almost ensures winning the dungeon's boss. A recent addition to the Special Dungeons is a system that scores the player based on their dungeon performance and team make up and awards the player an additional rare monster for achieving a high score. Added to the version 7.2 update are "Coin Dungeons", Special Dungeons that the player can purchase with the in-game coin currency for one hour at a time, including several new Dungeons and new monsters only accessible in revamped dungeons. The Challenge Dungeon was also added to the game, appearing for limited times and offering prizes for successfully clearing increasingly difficult floors of the dungeon. A recent update added new Dungeons with roguelike gameplay, allowing players to challenge series of monsters, their own team leveling up along the way, to win monsters and in-game currency.

There are also Ranking Dungeons which appear as special events and last for one week. Sometimes you will be given a team or you have to make a team for yourself. Finish the Ranking Dungeons with the time limit 300 seconds and get scores according to the performance you did in the dungeons. All players will compete for higher score. Certain rank will be given certain prices. Players that reach top 3% of the rank will be given a crown that can be placed next to your character name.

Multiplayer dungeons allow a player to play with one to two others. There are two player (2P) dungeons and three-player (3P) dungeons, each with their own set of dungeons.

Two player dungeons consist of most Technical, most Special, and 2-player specific dungeons. Each player selects one leader that is shared among the two players. Each player also brings their own 4 subs. All leaders and subs are formed into one team with health points, resist awakenings, skill boost awakenings are shared between players.

Three player dungeons have their own set of specific dungeons. However, various technical and special dungeon periodically show up. Unlike two player dungeons, three player dungeon teams are separate. Each player chooses their own 2 leaders and 4 subs. No monsters stats or awakenings are shared between players. Also, three player dungeons have the option to be played with 2 players.

In 2021, a Player versus Player (PvP) mode was introduced called 8-player mode to the main game. This mode features playing against 7 other players in a synchronous setting. This mode is not directly played against other player monsters, but instead gives players pre-built teams where players compete for high scores, and some skills are modified to interrupt other players instead of the enemy monsters.

=== In-game currencies ===
Puzzle & Dragons features multiple types of in-game currencies that the player uses for various purposes. The most versatile are the Magic Stones. Players are awarded Magic Stones for completing dungeons for the first time (or for the first time through Challenge Mode), or they can be purchased through the in-game store. Magic Stones are used to increase the capacity of the player's monster inventory, restore stamina to full capacity, increase the capacity of the player's friend list (after a certain level), and continue play in a dungeon if the player lost all HP. However, they are also used as payment for the Egg Machines, where the player can win rarer monsters. Players often save up Magic Stones for special server events where the rarer monsters have an increased payout at the Rare Egg Machine. These are split between Galas for single elemental types, Carnivals for themed sets of monsters, or the Godfests where the game's rarest God type monsters, have increased payout. While most rare monsters can be obtained at any time from the Rare Egg Machine, there are monsters that can only be obtained during the Godfests.

Pal Points are an additional form of currency found in the game, which is awarded for participating in dungeons with other players. These are spent at the Pal Egg Machine, which usually does not award the player rare monsters, unless there is an event to make some rarer monsters more readily available from the Pal Egg Machine. Coins, along with experience points and monster eggs, are awarded to the player for completing dungeons. Coins are required for fusing monsters together, either for experience or evolution. They are also used to purchase access to the Coin Dungeons, which give the player a chance to play certain time-limited Special Dungeons or play new versions of dungeons with higher difficulties to attempt to win new rare monsters exclusive to the Coin Dungeons.

Most recently a new type of currency, Monster Points (MP), have been added to the game. These points can be obtained by selling monsters, with higher rarity monsters selling for more Monster Points. These points can be spent at the special Monster Point Shop to buy Evolution Materials, Tamadras, Latent Tamadras, and other rare monsters unobtainable from the Rare Egg Machine.

=== Collaborations ===
Puzzle & Dragons is also known for its collaboration events with several other iconic video games and anime properties. During collaborations, Special Dungeons and special Collaboration Egg Machines are added to the game which contain monsters that can be obtained for a limited time; otherwise, they may never be obtained again until a collaboration is announced for a rerun. Most of the collaborations are exclusive to the Japanese edition of the game, but many have been released to the international editions. The collaborations are as follows (in chronological order as they were added to the Japanese edition of the game):

- Ragnarok Online
- Emil Chronicle Online
- Taiko no Tatsujin
- Gunma's Ambition
- Crystal Defenders
- GungHo's Princess Punt
- Google Play
- Shinra Bansho chocolate
- Rebuild of Evangelion
- Clash of Clans
- 7-Eleven
- Taito's Groove Coaster Zero and Space Invaders
- Takaoka's Amitan Musume
- Ragnarok Odyssey Ace
- Dragon's Dogma Quest
- Monster Hunter Felyne Bazaar
- Batman: Arkham Origins
- Baskin-Robbins ("Thirty-One Ice Cream")
- Angry Birds
- Sanrio's Hello Kitty
- Puzzle & Dragons Z
- Hunter × Hunter
- Puzzle & Dragons Battle Tournament
- Beams
- Dragon Ball Kai
- Saint Seiya: Legend of Sanctuary
- Bikkuriman
- Monster Hunter 4 Ultimate
- DC Comics: The New 52
- Puzzle & Dragons Trading Card Game
- Fist of the North Star
- Final Fantasy
- Bleach
- Attack on Titan
- Ghost in the Shell: The New Movie
- Crows
- Weekly Shōnen Sunday, participating titles:
  - Detective Conan
  - Inuyasha
  - Urusei Yatsura
  - Ushio and Tora
  - Kyō Kara Ore Wa!!
  - Flame of Recca
  - Magi: The Labyrinth of Magic
- Voltron
- The King of Fighters '98
- Fullmetal Alchemist: Brotherhood
- Yu Yu Hakusho
- Shin Megami Tensei: Persona, participating titles:
  - Persona 3
  - Persona 4
  - Persona 5
- Magic: The Gathering
- GungHo's Chrono Ma:Gia and GungHo's Summons Board
- Sword Art Online
- Fate/Stay Night
- Street Fighter V: Arcade Edition
- McDonald's
- JoJo's Bizarre Adventure: The Animation
- Shaman King
- Kamen Rider
- Demon Slayer: Kimetsu no Yaiba
- Devil May Cry
- Samurai Shodown
- Jujutsu Kaisen
- One Piece
- Re:Zero

== Related apps ==
=== Puzzle & Dragons Challenge ===
Puzzle & Dragons Challenge (パズドラチャレンジ, Pazudora Charenji) is a spin-off application made available for a few times between 2013 and 2014. Players of Puzzle & Dragons Challenge must use a set team of supplied monsters to defeat a series of powerful monsters within a 5-minute time limit.

In a future update to the standard Puzzle & Dragons app, Puzzle & Dragons Challenge will be further integrated, with players able to use their own designed teams to play against other players' teams for Pal Points, effectively creating customized dungeons.

=== Puzzle & Dragons W ===
Gameplay in Puzzle & Dragons W. In this level, the player must make at least two water orb combos in order to perform damage on the enemy DeviTAMA character on the left.

On July 29, 2014, the Japanese edition of Puzzle & Dragons updated to version 7.0.0 and with the update came Puzzle & Dragons W (パズドラＷ, Pazudora Daburyū), a second game packaged with the normal Puzzle & Dragons. It primarily features the TAMADRA monster from Puzzle & Dragons, and tells the story of how their AvaTAMA (アバたま, Abatama) eggs, eggs containing clothing bestowed upon them by the other monsters, were stolen by the evil King DeviTAMA for his own use. The AvaTAMA pieces are the primary collectibles in Puzzle & Dragons W, instead of monsters.

Gameplay in Puzzle & Dragons W is similar to that in the standard game. Players spend stamina points to begin levels where they are given a certain amount of time to move a single orb around the puzzle board to make combos in order to perform damage on the enemy. However, the game is geared more towards the puzzle aspect than the RPG elements of Puzzle & Dragons. The board in Puzzle & Dragons W is a 6-by-6 grid, and instead of monsters the player has a TAMADRA avatar that he or she customizes with the collected AvaTAMA hats, handheld items, and shell decorations. Each AvaTAMA activates different skills that the player can use on a puzzle, which is activated when the player touches a special skill star orb that appears on the board. Skills usually either change the color of orbs on the board or clears orbs such as in a line across the board, but there are skills that deal damage or give the player free movement for a period of time. Like in the regular game, players also pick a friend or explorer and their TAMADRA avatar and AvaTAMA pieces assist the player in completing the puzzles. New types of orbs have been added: rainbow-colored W orbs that act as wild cards for any three matches made with it, the white Angel orbs (included at launch), and the black Devil orbs (added in a later update). Jammer orbs have been changed to fill up the board where they cannot be matched, but can be removed if another nearby line is cleared; purple Jammer orbs multiply on the board if not cleared.

In order to perform damage to the enemy DeviTAMAs, the player must meet a certain goal for that level's puzzles. These take the form of requiring a particular color or set of colors be matched in a single turn, that a certain number of combos be made in a single turn, that a particular number of orbs be matched in a single combo, or any combination of the three. Players are given a limited number of turns per area (instead of dungeons) to reach these goals, but turns can be restored by matching heart orbs. Once all of the DeviTAMA enemies have been defeated, the player wins the level, and is then shown their score based on the number of turns left and their average number of combos. This score is then graded from one to three stars, and then awarded the contents of any AvaTAMA eggs and treasure chests that the enemies dropped. If the AvaTAMA are duplicates of what the player already owns, the item is leveled up instead of taking up inventory space. Treasure chests award the player medals, a new form of in-game currency. The next stage is unlocked once the player has a minimum of 4 stars for a single stage's three areas, but this doesn't require that all three areas be cleared. Clearing the third area is usually more difficult and requires more stamina, but finishing it for the first time restores the player's stamina and either awards a greater quantity of medals or a Magic Stone, which is carried over to the standard Puzzle & Dragons account.

As in the regular game, players can use Magic Stones to restore stamina, continue dungeons where the turns ran out, and increase the friend list capacity. The medals earned in the game go towards the Puzzle & Dragons W version of the Egg Machine. While single common items can be won with a fairly low number of medals spent, rarer items cost more medals and the rarest items can only be won if playing a multiple item spin.

Puzzle & Dragons W has also featured limited edition collaboration AvaTAMA pieces, first with the band Arashi and later with Detective Conan.

=== Puzzle & Dragons Radar ===
Puzzle and Dragons Radar is an accessory app for Puzzle and Dragons meant to add augmented reality functionality with GPS support to the main game. It is available only in Japan. The app can be linked to the player's Puzzle and Dragons account. By playing through the Radar game, the player can collect orbs by walking around and exploring. The orbs can be redeemed for items and monsters in Puzzle and Dragons, including Tamadras, Piis, 1 hour dungeons, and many other prizes.

== Spin-offs ==
=== Puzzle & Dragons Battle Tournament ===
The Puzzle & Dragons Battle Tournament (パズドラ バトルトーナメント, Pazudora Batoru Tōnamento; shortened to Pazubato (パズバト)) arcade game was released in collaboration with Square Enix on April 24, 2014. Gameplay in Battle Tournament is similar to the mobile game. The player uses a team of monsters and solves a tile-matching puzzle to determine how powerful their monsters' attacks are, and can activate their monsters' active skills during play for various effects and choose one monster to serve as team leader to use the passive leader skill. However, several changes were made to suit the arcade version, which uses the NESiCA smart card to save playing data for individual players. The puzzle is now on an 8-by-5 grid, allowing for greater movement and combos. The player's team of monsters consists only of their leader monster, four sub members ("subs"), and a friend monster, however the player can also choose three reserve monsters that they can switch into play. Players choose avatars to play through the game's story mode as well as its online mode to play against other players in real time, and these avatars have their own active skills that can be used during play. Monsters' HP is not pooled, and individual monsters can be temporarily knocked out of play if they lose all HP. If more damage is dealt by the player's monsters when any have run out of HP, then the opponent receives direct damage. When either player's HP runs out, they lose the match. Throughout play, players can obtain special items used to either evolve their collected monsters or to use the game's Rare Egg Machine to obtain new monsters.

The first version of the game was subtitled Lazul Kingdom and Madoromi Dragon (ラズール王国とマドロミドラゴン, Razūru Ōkoku to Madoromi Doragon). An update subtitled Champions of Lazul (チャンピオンズ オブ ラズール, Chanpionzu Obu Razūru) was released nationwide on November 26, 2014.

=== Puzzle & Dragons Trading Card Game ===
The Puzzle & Dragons Trading Card Game was released in Japan on January 15, 2015. Gameplay involves matching up orbs on different cards to perform attacks or combos. To commemorate the release, a new limited time dungeon was added to the video game featuring a monster created for the trading card game.

=== Puzzle & Dragons Z + Super Mario Bros. Edition ===
On May 3, 2013, GungHo revealed a spin-off for the Nintendo 3DS named Puzzle & Dragons Z (パズドラZ, Pazudora Zetto) during the Puzzle & Dragons Fan Appreciation Festival 2013. The game was released in Japan on December 12, 2013. Game play is in general identical to the mobile game, but it adds RPG elements such as towns and NPCs. As of July 30, 2014, the game has shipped over 1.5 million copies. A manga about Puzzle & Dragons Z has been serialized in CoroCoro Comic since September 29, 2013, and the first tankōbon volume was released on April 28, 2014.

Puzzle & Dragons Z was released in North America and Europe in May 2015, packaged alongside the Super Mario Bros. Edition.

An arcade game edition titled Puzzle & Dragons Z: Tamer Battle (パズドラZ テイマーバトル, Pazudora Zetto Teimā Batoru) was released on June 26, 2014. Players scan collectible trading cards into the arcade machine which they use to battle another player elsewhere in Japan in a similar system to the handheld game. There is additionally an incentive to use a "Z Bonus" indicated by a part of the card that will be cut off by the machine if chosen.

Puzzle & Dragons: Super Mario Bros. Edition for the Nintendo 3DS features characters from the Super Mario series in gameplay similar to that from Puzzle & Dragons Z, including an overworld and story. It was released on April 29, 2015, in Japan as a standalone title and later in South Korea on May 1, 2015. For the North American and European release, it was packaged with Puzzle & Dragons Z.

=== Puzzle & Dragons X ===
A second spin-off for the Nintendo 3DS named Puzzle & Dragons X was released in July 2016 along with an anime adaptation of the game by studio Pierrot.

=== Puzzle & Dragons GOLD ===
The first Nintendo Switch version of Puzzle & Dragons released on January 14, 2020 in North America. The game is handheld mode only, It contains a short campaign with a focus of competitive online battles.

=== PUZZLE & DRAGONS Nintendo Switch™ Edition ===
The second Nintendo Switch version of Puzzle & Dragons released on February 19, 2022 in North America. It can be played in both handheld and docked mode with controllers. The game has a 1-4 player co-op and up to 8 player online PVP. Players are encouraged to make their own custom dungeons and share them online for others to play.

=== Puzzle & Dragons Story ===
A version for Apple Arcade titled Puzzle & Dragons Story was developed for iOS, iPadOS, macOS, and tvOS, and was released on December 5, 2023.

== Development ==
Prior to Puzzle & Dragons' release, GungHo had primarily been involved in assisting in computer and console games from its formation in 2002, including Ragnarok Online. The company's founder and CEO, Kazuki Morishita, found that the quality of their games had started to diminish, and moved more of his time over into the creative development department, and guided the company towards mobile gaming around 2010. Prior to Puzzle & Dragons' release, they had already published about ten games.

The idea for Puzzle & Dragons came about around August 2011, according to Morishita. They observed that at that time, card battle games were popular mobile applications in Japan, though Morishita felt most of the titles were not great. They worked to craft a new type of card battle game, combining gameplay genres such as the tile-matching puzzle aspects and role-playing game exploration. After about a month, they recognized they had the core of the game down, and subsequently a team of six developers completed work on the title over the next six months.

Though they desired to release the game simultaneously for both iOS and Android, their small team size required them to stagger the releases. Using the Unity game engine, they developed natively on the iOS and then added more developers comfortable with the Unity engine to help port the Android version. The game was first released on iOS platform in Japanese markets on February 20, 2012 without any advertising, and had topped the app charts within a few days. When they released the Android version on September 18, 2012, GungHo opted to employ television spots to promote the title since it was now available on both platforms. The Android version tops its charts within a week and a half of going live. English and Korean versions of the game were released about half a year after the success in Japan.

GungHo released the title as a free-to-play app, with players able to spend money to continue to explore dungeons after depleting their stamina or being defeated in a dungeon, to collect more monsters, or to attempt to get rare monsters from a random draw. Morishita said they found that as players became accustomed to the gain, their spending habits switched from getting continued dungeon exploration toward obtaining more and rarer monsters.

According to Morishita, in 2014 about forty developers and artists are working on the title, with nearly half of those focused on continuing updates and art assets. The game has developed some new modes such as challenge mode, technical dungeons, and a new ranking system in certain dungeons where the player is awarded points based on overall combo number, rarity, cost, and more.

GungHo has announced that Puzzle & Dragons will cease support for devices with operating systems lower than iOS 6 and Android Ice Cream Sandwich (4.0) in December 2014 in Japan and in spring 2015 for North America and Europe. Puzzle & Dragons W is already not supported on the iPhone 3GS and third generation iPod Touch as well as versions of Android lower than Android Honeycomb (3.0).

== Music ==
Puzzle & Dragons's soundtrack is composed by Kenji Ito and Yukio Nakajima. A soundtrack containing Ito's contributions was released on April 3, 2013, via the iTunes Store. Ito was also the composer for Puzzle & Dragons Z and Puzzle & Dragons: Battle Tournament; Kohei Tanaka also participated in the composition of the Battle Tournament soundtrack.

== Reception ==
Puzzle & Dragons won a CEDEC Game Design award in 2012.

The game also has a series of official merchandise in Japan, sold at AppBank Store locations as well as through an official Puzzle & Dragons online store. Items sold include phone cases, phone straps, books, plush toys, figurines, and even snack foods also sold at Japanese grocery stores. Other video games for handheld consoles and video arcades have also been released in Japan, as well as merchandise only available from claw cranes.

The lyrics to the 2021 song "Ignite" by heavy metal band Mary's Blood were inspired by Puzzle & Dragons and are about one of its characters.

=== Sales ===
In April 2013 it was the highest-grossing app in the world on iOS and Android. In mid-2013, the Japanese version of the game had been downloaded more than 18 million times, which represents nearly 10 percent of the country's population. As of October 2013 the game has been downloaded 20 million times in Japan and over a million times in North America. It has an estimated daily revenue of $4.5 million. In May 2014, GungHo announced that Puzzle & Dragons surpassed 28 million downloads in Japan, and the North American version surpassed 4 million downloads. In October 2015, GungHo announced that Puzzle & Dragons surpassed 50 million downloads worldwide, with 38 million downloads in Japan, 8 million in North America, 2 million in South Korea, and 2 million in Taiwan and Hong Kong. By October 2017, the game exceeded 62 million downloads, including 46 million in Japan and 12 million in North America.

In 2012, the game earned a revenue of ¥14.599 billion (equivalent to $183 million). In 2013 and 2014, it had an annual revenue of $1.5 billion. Puzzle & Dragons thus became the first mobile game in history to gross $1 billion in revenue. By the end of 2017, the game grossed $6 billion in revenue. It was the highest-grossing mobile app of all time up until it was surpassed by Monster Strike in October 2018. Puzzle & Dragons has grossed $7 billion, and is the second-highest-grossing mobile app of all time, as of October 2018.

As of 2021, the revenue of the game has declined steadily but still performs well in Japan, maintaining its top 50 spot as best-selling mobile games. However the English market for the game has not been as successful among western audiences. As of 2025, GungHo Online Entertainment reported a year-on-year decline in earnings for the fiscal year on December 31, 2025. The decline on sales was reportedly driven by weaker sales from flagship title Puzzle & Dragons, which had hosted fewer collaborations with external media and characters than in the previous year.

=== Criticism ===
A Gamasutra blog discussing "coercive monetization" tactics in video games mentioned Puzzle & Dragons as one of the most skillful examples of making players believe they are playing a skill game, while in fact being a money game (i.e. enticing players to spend more and more money).

A Video Games Chronicle blog and Automation news report discuss a proposal from Investment advisor Strategic Capital sent to GungHo on behalf of its shareholders, calling on the company to "up its game", citing heavy reliance on Puzzles & Dragons' initial success leading to long-term decline of profit for the company. Declining profit of the game was also stated by the Strategic Capital report to be the result of GungHo CEO's "lack of serious engagement with shareholders or users".
