= Ragnarok DS =

2008 video game

- North American cover art
- Developer: Tose
- Publishers: JP: GungHo Online Entertainment; KOR: Gravity; NA: Xseed Games
- Designer: Masayuki Morimoto
- Series: Ragnarok series
- Platform: Nintendo DS
- Release: JP: December 18, 2008; KR: June 25, 2009; NA: February 16, 2010
- Genre: Role-playing
- Modes: Single-player, multiplayer

Ragnarok DS, known in Japan as Ragnarok Online DS (ラグナロクオンラインDS, Ragunaroku Onrain Dī Esu), is a Nintendo DS video game based on the MMORPG Ragnarok Online and was released in Japan on December 18, 2008. Xseed Games published the game in North America on February 16, 2010. The game was also released in South Korea in June 2009.

GungHo Online Entertainment, the company that hosts the Japanese server of Ragnarok Online, expanded its business for video game consoles; Ragnarok DS is the sixth of eight games for DS to be released by them, along with Love Revo!! DS, Indo Shiki Keisan Drill DS, Aqua Zone DS, 100 Kiri Golf DS, Hero's Saga Laevatein Tactics, Minna de Jibun no Setsumeisho: B-Kata, A-Kata, AB-Kata, O-Kata and Ecolis: Aoi Umi to Ugoku Shima.

== Gameplay ==
The massively multiplayer features of the original are not present in this version, but it supports up to three players simultaneously in a variety of multi-player dungeons.

Two new exclusive classes are released alongside this game: Dark Knight and Shaman.

The game follows the plights of the main character Ales as he ventures out in the world to form a guild after the death of his mother. Ales' father, who was also an adventurer, has been missing for several years and Ales blames him for not being present to take care of her. Along his way to fame and fortune several characters are introduced and join Ales in completing specific tasks, usually resulting in permanent companionship. After completing the main storyline, the guild will be formed and access is gained to storage, where the new recruit characters and the option to edit the characters are in the player's party.

The mirage tower, a 50 floor dungeon consisting of a boss character every 5 levels is a single or multiplayer challenge and contains the most valuable items in the game. After beating a boss characters will be presented with a bidding screen to determine loot distribution and a base experience and job experience award will be doled out to each participant. Monsters inside the tower themselves do not offer any experience. Computer controlled allies are unable to enter the dungeon, so single player attempts will consist of just the player character. The main characters hair color and hair style as well as gender can be altered for play in the tower with each boss unlocking more hair styles and colors.

The game is designed to be almost entirely controlled by the DS stylus for simplicity and ease of use. Additionally, the game is designed to follow a quest based story line with the options of side-quest to gain access to additional rewards. Only one side-quest can be accepted at a time despite the fact that multiple side-quests are available for each area. Players who want to accomplish more side-quests will have to visit the same areas multiple times.

== Development and release ==
Ragnarok DS was developed by GungHo Online Entertainment. It was released in Japan on 18 December 2008. It was published by Xseed Games in North America in February 2010.

== Reception ==
Reception

Aggregate score
Aggregator	Score
Metacritic	53/100

Review scores
Publication	Score
Famitsu	28/40
GamePro	2.5/5
GameRevolution	C+
GameZone	5/10
IGN	7/10
NGamer	48%
Nintendo Power	5/10
RPGamer	2/5
RPGFan	70%
411Mania	4.5/10

The game received "mixed" reviews according to the review aggregation website Metacritic. In Japan, Famitsu gave it a score of all four sevens for a total of 28 out of 40.
