= 4Story =

Videogame

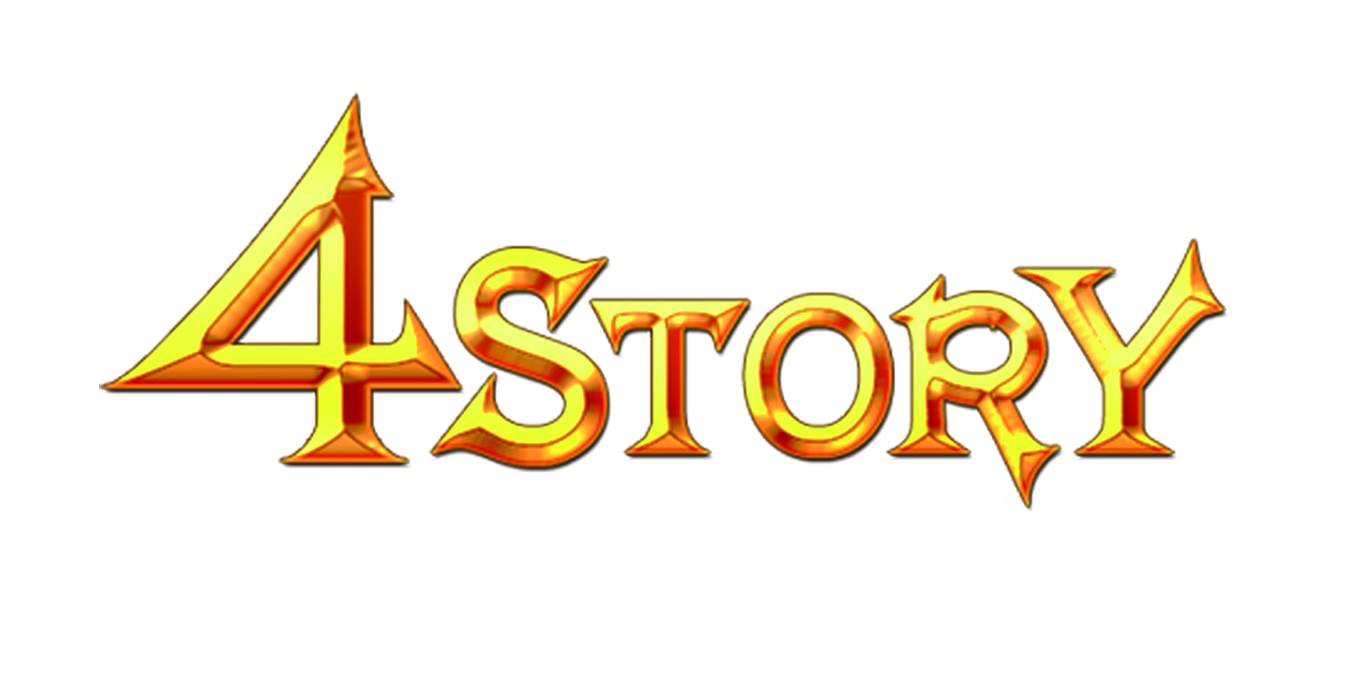
- Developer: Zemi Interactive
- Publisher: Gameforge
- Platform: Microsoft Windows
- Release: KOR: 2007; NA/EU: 2009
- Genre: Massively multiplayer online role-playing game

4Story (also known as Gates of Andaron) is a free-to-play massively multiplayer online role-playing game (MMORPG) developed by the South Korean studio Zemi Interactive and released in 2007. It was published in North America and Europe by the German company Gameforge in 2009. The game features a three-faction system and focuses primarily on player versus player (PvP) combat rather than player versus environment (PvE) content.

In 2025, the game was released on Steam as 4Story: The Original. The release received mostly negative reviews and was removed from the platform later that year.

== Gameplay ==
The game takes place in a fictional land of Iberia, which is divided among three factions: Valorian, Derion, and Gor. Players may engage in open PvP combat, area conquests, castle conquests, and arena battles.

=== Races ===
Players can choose from three different races: Fairy, Werebeast, and Human.

=== Classes ===
The game offers six different classes to play.

- Warrior – melee combat fighter; uses swords, axes and shields; can wear chain and plate armor
- Assassin – swift melee-combat attacker; uses chakrams and daggers; can wear leather armor
- Archer – ranged combat class; uses bows and crossbows; can wear leather armor
- Wizard – magic-based ranged class; uses staves and wands; can wear robes
- Priest – support class focused on healing and protection; uses staves and wands; can wear robes
- Summoner – summons creatures to assist in combat; uses staves and wands; can wear leather armor
