= GungHo Online Entertainment =

Japanese video game developer and publisher

GungHo Online Entertainment, Inc.
- Native name: ガンホー・オンライン・エンターテイメント株式会社
- Romanized name: Ganhō Onrain Entāteinmento kabushiki gaisha
- Type: Public
- Traded as: TYO: 3765
- Industry: Video games
- Founded: July 1, 1998; 28 years ago
- Headquarters: Chiyoda, Tokyo, Japan
- Key people: Taizo Son (chairman); Kazuki Morishita (president & CEO)
- Services: Video game Development, Publishing, Distribution, Operation
- Number of employees: 333 (2014)
- Parent: SoftBank Group (1998–2016); SON Financial (2016–2026); Sony Music Entertainment Japan (22.93%) (2026–present)
- Subsidiaries: Game Arts; Gravity; GungHo Mode; GungHo Online Entertainment America; GungHo Gamania; GungHo Works mspo SUPERTRICK GAMES
- Website: www.gungho.co.jp

GungHo Online Entertainment, Inc. (Japanese: ガンホー・オンライン・エンターテイメント株式会社, Hepburn: Ganhō Onrain Entāteimento kabushiki gaisha) is a Japanese video game developer and publisher. Their most prominent game is the mobile game Puzzle & Dragons, originally published in 2012 but still a major game in 2025, and the source of the vast majority of the company's revenue in the 2010s and 2020s. They are also known for hosting the Japanese server of Ragnarok Online, developed by its listed Korean subsidiary Gravity.

== History ==
The company was established as ONSale Co., Ltd. on July 1, 1998, as a joint venture between Softbank and onSale Inc. to engage in the online interactive auction business in the US.

- In 2000, the company moved its headquarters to Chiyoda, Tokyo, Japan and changed its focus to providing auction systems, etc. using ASP.
- In 2002, the company once again changed its focus, this time to Online Game Services. Primarily hosting the Japanese server of Ragnarok Online.
- In 2004 the company began joint development of online games with Game Arts Co., Ltd.
- In March 2005, the company was listed on the Hercules Nippon New Market.
- In August 2005, the company invested in G-Mode Co., Ltd. a game manufacturer for mobile phones.
- In December 2005, the MMORPG developed by GungHo, Emil Chronicle Online, was officially released.
- In August 2006, it completed the contract to distribute Ragnarok Online II.
- In October 2007, GungHo Works, Inc., behind the development of Ragnarok DS, was established.
- In November 2007, the company acquired the video game assets of Interchannel from Index Corporation.
- In April 2008, Gravity Co., Ltd. was acquired as a subsidiary.
- In 2012, GungHo released the mobile Puzzle & Dragons which single-handedly made the company a huge financial success. In 2013, P&D was reportedly responsible for 91% of the company's $1.6 billion revenues for the year.
- In January 2013, GungHo acquired Grasshopper Manufacture, the studio behind titles such as Killer7, the No More Heroes franchise and Lollipop Chainsaw.
- On June 3, 2016, Softbank agreed to sell most of its stake in GungHo (approximately 23.47%) for about $685 million, which would end Softbank's majority ownership of the company, resulting in Gungho no longer being an associate of Softbank. The offer was accepted by Gungho and completed by June 22, thus allowing Gungho to become an independent company.
- In October 2021, GungHo sold Grasshopper Manufacture to NetEase.
- In February 2024, GungHo sold Acquire Corp. to Kadokawa Corporation.
- In 2025, the investor fund Strategic Capital, holder of an joint 8% stake in the shares of the company, launched a shareholder bid to oust CEO Kazuki Morishita. They argued that Morishita had let the company stagnate as a "one-hit wonder" without anything else of the level of success of Puzzle & Dragons, and that Morishita was overpaid, with him earning a higher salary than Nintendo's president.
- In August 2026, Gungho and Sony Music Entertainment Japan announced a capital and business alliance agreement, with it being focused in expanding the partnership of the companies for promotion and development of joint projects and with Sony Music acquiring 22.93% of the shares of Gungho and becoming the largest shareholder in the company. Despite that both companies confirmed that while Gungho stays listed as a public company, Sony Music will respect its independency, even if now it has more influence.

== Games ==
=== Active online games ===
- Ragnarok Online (December 1, 2001)
- Tantra (March 10, 2004)
- Emil Chronicle Online (August 1, 2005)
- Hiten Online (April 19, 2007)
- ROSE Online (March 26, 2009)
- Lucent Heart (2009)
- Blade Chronicle (2009)
- Ragnarok DS (February 1, 2010)
- Eternal City 2 (June 23, 2010)
- Divina (September 9, 2010)
- Grand Fantasia
- ROSE Online
- Le Ciel Bleu
- Toy Wars
- Fishdom: Seasons under the Sea
- Puzzle & Dragons
- Summons Board
- Chrono Ma:Gia (2018)
- Ragnarok Mobile (2019)
- Ninjala (2020)

=== Inactive online games ===
- Survival Project (June 29, 2004 - August 31, 2006)
- A3 (October 15, 2004 - November 1, 2007)
- Saiyuki Reload Gunlock (September 1, 2004 - January 31, 2006)
- Squirrel Pot 2 (May 25, 2004 - December 28, 2007)
- eXtreme Soccer (β August 11, 2006 – 2008)
- Mahjong (May 31, 2007 - March 26, 2008)
- Koi Koi Playing Cards (May 31, 2007 - March 26, 2008)
- Poker (May 31, 2007 - March 26, 2008)
- Millionaire (May 31, 2007 - March 26, 2008)
- Shanghai (May 31, 2007 - March 26, 2008)
- Chat (May 31, 2007 - March 26, 2008)
- Ragnarok Online II (β May 28, 2007 - August 2010)
- Pachinko Slot (September 6, 2007 - November 4, 2008)
- Hakenden (June 4, 2008 - October 29, 2008)
- Yogurting (September 1, 2005 - May, 2010)
- Tetris Online (October 23, 2007 - July 5, 2011)
- Shin Megami Tensei: Imagine (June 26, 2007 - May, 2016)
- Grandia Online (August 26, 2009 - September 28, 2012)
- TEPPEN (July 4, 2019 - March 30, 2026)

=== PC ===
- Grandia II: Anniversary Edition
- Let It Die
- Grandia HD Collection (Grandia & Grandia II Remaster)
- Lunar Remastered Collection (Lunar: Silver Star Story & Lunar: Eternal Blue Remaster)
- Trails in the Sky 1st Chapter
- Trails in the Sky 2nd Chapter
- B.L.U.E. Nova

=== PlayStation 2 ===
- Nadepro!!: Kisama mo Seiyū Yattemiro!

=== PlayStation Portable ===
- Solfege: Sweet Harmony
- Mimana Iyar Chronicle
- Cho Aniki Zero
- P.W: Project Witch
- Lunar: Silver Star Harmony
- Ragnarok Tactics

=== PlayStation 3 ===
- Ragnarok Odyssey Ace

=== PlayStation Vita ===
- Ragnarok Odyssey
- Ragnarok Odyssey Ace
- Picotto Knights
- Dokuro

=== PlayStation 4 ===
- Let It Die
- Grandia HD Collection (Grandia & Grandia II Remaster)
- Lunar Remastered Collection (Lunar: Silver Star Story & Lunar: Eternal Blue Remaster)

=== PlayStation 5 ===
- Trails in the Sky 1st Chapter
- Trails in the Sky 2nd Chapter

=== Nintendo DS ===
- Otometeki Koi Kakumei Love Revo!!
- Nakamura Tooru Kanshuu: India Shiki Keisan Drill DS (The Method of Indian Calculation)
- Aquazone DS
- Ragnarok DS
- Hero's Saga Laevatein Tactics
- Minna de Jibun no Setsumeisho: B-Gata, A-Gata, AB-Gata, O-Gata
- Ecolis: Aoi Umi to Ugoku Shima

=== Nintendo 3DS ===
- Puzzle & Dragons Z + Super Mario Bros. Edition
- Puzzle & Dragons X (Japan only)

=== Nintendo Switch ===
- Grandia HD Collection (Grandia & Grandia II Remaster)
- Puzzle & Dragons Gold
- Ninjala
- Volta-X
- Galak-Z: Variant S
- Lunar Remastered Collection (Lunar: Silver Star Story & Lunar: Eternal Blue Remaster)
- Trails in the Sky 1st Chapter
- Trails in the Sky 2nd Chapter

=== Nintendo Switch 2 ===
- Trails in the Sky 1st Chapter
- Trails in the Sky 2nd Chapter
- Ninjala 2: The Uncharted Planet
- Chit Chat Party!

=== Xbox One ===
- Grandia HD Collection (Grandia & Grandia II Remaster)
- Lunar Remastered Collection (Lunar: Silver Star Story & Lunar: Eternal Blue Remaster)

=== Mobile ===
- Teppen (Battle Project)
- Ragnarok Online
- Casino Komodo
- Puzzles and Dragons
- Yo-kai Watch World
- Galak-Z: Variant Mobile
- Disney Pixel RPG
