= Dragon's Prophet =

2013 video game

- Developer: Runewaker Entertainment
- Publishers: NA: Sony Online Entertainment; EU: Gamigo; JP: Aeria Games
- Platform: Microsoft Windows
- Release: NA: September 23, 2013; EU: September 18, 2013
- Genre: MMORPG
- Mode: Multiplayer

Dragon's Prophet was a massively multiplayer online role-playing game (MMORPG) developed by Taiwanese developer Runewaker Entertainment. After going through an open beta phase, the game was officially launched in September 2013. The game client was free to download, and no monthly subscription fee was required as the service was funded by real money transactions. On October 5, 2015 Sony Online Entertainment announced that they would cease operation of the North American servers on November 16, 2015. European and Taiwanese publishers continuing operations until May, 2020, when servers were shut down worldwide.

== Features ==
The player character battles one of many dragons found within the game. The player also has the option of capturing it to use as a mount and as a pet to assist in combat.

Dragon's Prophet features an action-based combat system, with the player using the mouse for auto-targeting and attack combos. The game also features the ability to tame a dragon which can be used to aid the player in combat or as a flying mount when out of combat. The dragon can also be improved along with the player as they progress. The huge world contains many different types of enemies, artifacts, dungeons, public quests, world bosses, cities etc.

Player housing is also available, giving the player the option to buy their own house and customize it with items found throughout the world, crafted, or purchased.

The game features an end-game sandbox player versus player design called the "Frontier System". It consist of a map of islands which guild alliances can compete for control of in order to capture strongholds. When an alliance completes the objectives required, one player is appointed as a commander and has the power to strategically place defenses, levy land taxes over the player housing areas, spawn unique NPC's, and setup quests in which special tokens can be earned by other players. At any time another alliance can challenge the controlling alliance for control of the frontier.

== Classes ==
There is a total of 4 different character classes available in Dragon's Prophet. These are: Guardian, Ranger, Oracle, and Sorcerer.

Guardian: Guardians are heavily armed melee combatants with proficiency in one and two handed weapons. In addition they have the ability to use a shield.

Ranger: Rangers are marksmen who excel at range with their bow.

Oracle: Oracles are lightly armored fighters who invest in magic for defensive spells and rejuvenation.

Sorcerer: Sorcerers are cloth wearing mages who prefer to use devastating offensive spells.

== Reception ==
Dragon's Prophet received generally mixed reviews according to review aggregator meta-critic.

IGN gave Dragon's Prophet an average 5.1/10 score. Stating "Dragon's Prophet never manages to turn the good idea of catching dragons into a good MMORPG."
