= Ragnarok Tactics =

2011 video game

- Japanese version cover art
- Developers: GungHo Online Entertainment; Apollosoft; Chime
- Publishers: JP: GungHo Online Entertainment; NA: Aksys Games
- Series: Ragnarok series
- Platform: PlayStation Portable
- Release: JP: October 27, 2011; NA: November 6, 2012
- Genre: Tactical RPG
- Mode: Single-player

Ragnarok Tactics (Note: Ragnarok Tactics (ラグナロク ～光と闇の皇女～, Ragnarok: Hikari to Yami no Kōjo)) is a tactical role-playing game for the PlayStation Portable. It is a spin-off to Ragnarok Online. The game was released in North America on November 6, 2012, making it one of the last releases for the platform in the region. Reception for the game was mixed, with critics citing that the gameplay and presentation was solid, but not revolutionary.

== Gameplay ==
The game is considered a spin-off to the original game in the series, Ragnarok Online. However, unlike Ragnarok Online, which is a massively multiplayer online role-playing game, Ragnarok Tactics is a tactical role-playing game, playing more similarly to Final Fantasy Tactics. However, elements of the Ragnarok Online universe are still present, such as similar settings or the fact that crouching/sitting can restore character's health.

The game is played on a grid, where the player must move characters strategically to cause damage to the opposing party, with the end goal usually to defeat the opposing side.

Customization is strongly emphasized in the game; with characters' genders, statistics, skills, equipment all being customizeable. Furthermore, the player can choose to join three different factions, and make different choices to take different paths throughout the game, leading to five different endings. The game does not require players to replay the game five times to see each ending, but rather, the player can opt to go back to crucial points in the game and choose a different path. Optional sidequests, largely unconnected to the main story characters, are also available to play at various points in the game.

== Plot ==
=== Setting ===
The game's story begins with two nations, Branshaldo Empire and the Aura Republic, at war with each other over possession of an area of land called the Grantria Peninsula. The nations call a truce, but relations remain poor, with the fear of war erupting again constantly looming. The player gets to choose which party they side with, determining which side of the story is told, and which of the five endings to the war is shown.

=== Characters ===
The game is played through the eyes of a silent protagonist named Rito by default, though he can be renamed. The only dialogue from the character results from when the player is presented with three dialogue choices on how to respond to a question, with the possible responses typically shown as a positive, negative, or indifferent answer. The characters that fight alongside Rito vary depends on the path the player opts for him to take. The player can choose to have Rito align with either the Branshaldo Empire, the Aura Republic, or neither. The player may also choose to have him stick with a certain side for the whole game, or switch sides throughout the game, although the plot typically flows more clearly if Rito sticks to a certain side.

If the player sides with Branshaldo Empire, Rito will fight alongside Cynthia, a cold, temperamental mage fiercely supportive of her home region. Her side of the story focuses more closely into the struggles of Princess Adelaide, who is tasked with ruling the entire empire once her father passes away due to illness, and Darius, the General who advises Adelaide and controls the troops. If the player sides with the Aura Republic, Rito will fight alongside Yuri, an extremely formal and devoted knight. His side of the story focuses more closely on his adoptive father, who is in charge of the Republic, and his struggles with his biological son, Veda, and his strong hate towards Branshaldo Empire. If the player has Rito not side with either party, he instead travels with his friend Toren, a good natured ex-mercenary who detests war. His story focuses on cleaning up messes that arise as a by-product of the war, protecting the village that houses his love interest, Livia, and pursuing the mysterious "Jester" character. Additionally, there are extra, minor characters that are unrelated to the main story, that only appear if the player chooses to play optional "Sub-Events". A majority of the characters filling out the actual battle rosters are actually generic characters, which are created and customized by the player, but have no impact on the game's story.

== Development ==
The game was first announced in April 2011 in an issue of Famitsu. In September 2011, GungHo released a demo that actually allowed players to play through the entirety of the game, although, through only one of the many paths and viewpoints of the game. At E3 2012, Aksys Games announced they would release the game in English in North America on November 6, 2012.

== Reception ==
Reception

Aggregate score
Aggregator	Score
Metacritic	65/100

The game received limited attention due to its late release in the PlayStation Portable's lifespan and garnered mixed reviews. GameZone awarded it a score of 8 out of 10, praising its graphics, which it described as "some of the best... on the system," as well as the structure of its story. However, the publication criticized the lack of voice acting in the story segments. The game's easier difficulty was also acknowledged here as well, but the reviewer felt that "...the less intense difficulty makes this particular game more enjoyable than it might have been otherwise...sometimes that’s exactly what a game needs when it still wants to be fun". RPGamer gave the game a middle of the road, 2.5 out of 5 review, stating that "...the game doesn't suffer from any major issues or grievances, there just seems to be a general lack of inspiration or anything to make the game stand out. However, Ragnarok Tactics is a decent time-killer that should at least be able to satisfy any tactical RPG itch, albeit one unlikely to make an impact on many favourites lists." PlayStation LifeStyle echoed these sentiments, praising the graphics, criticizing the lack of voice acting, and ultimately concluding that the game "is a good tactical RPG that never gives you a wow factor but stays solid throughout."
