= Gameforge =

Video game publisher and developer

Coordinates: 49.0200°N 8.4411°E

Gameforge AG

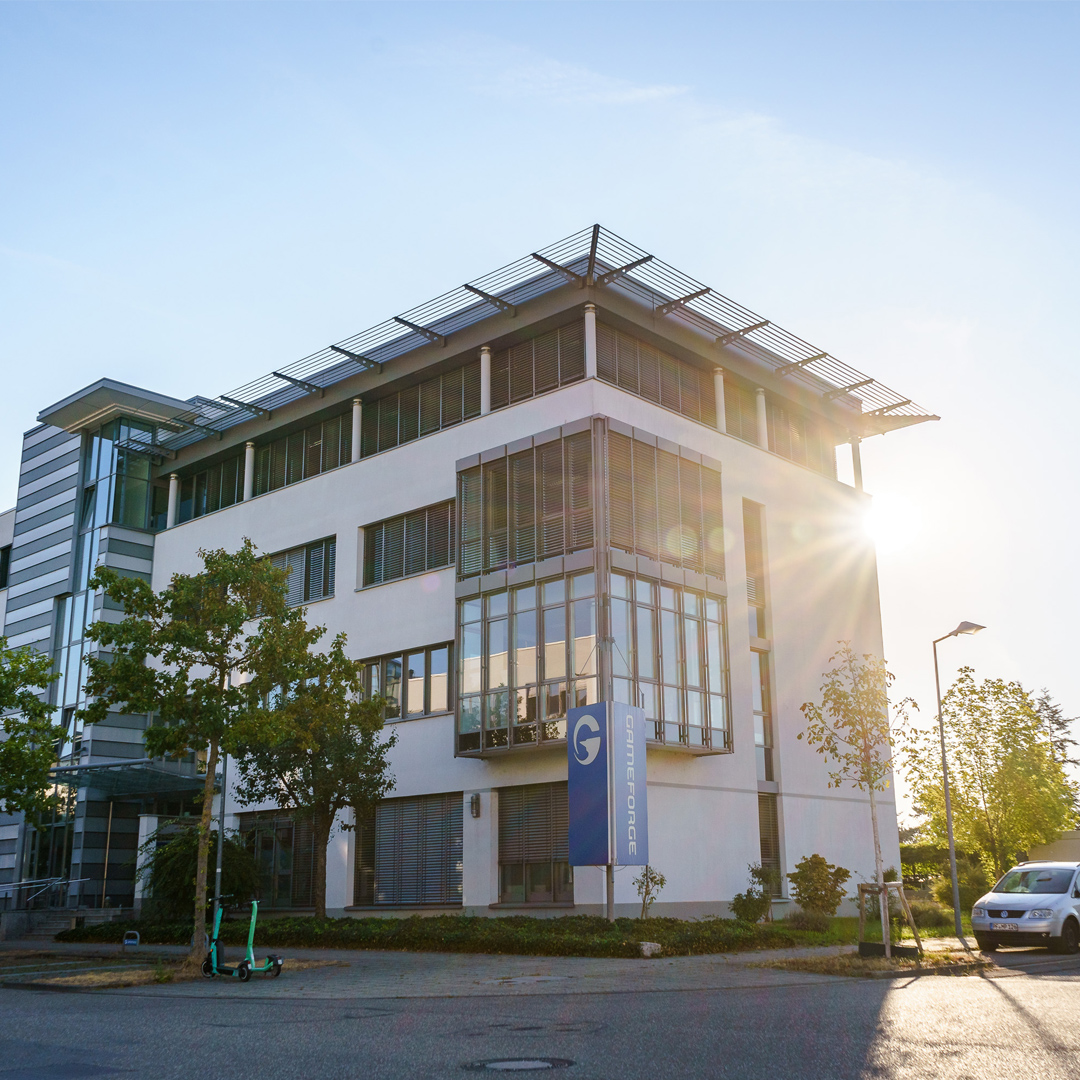
- Type: Aktiengesellschaft
- Industry: Online Games
- Founded: December 2003; 22 years ago
- Founder: Alexander Rösner, Klaas Kersting, Pelagos
- Headquarters: Karlsruhe, Albert-Nestler-Strasse 8, Germany
- Key people: Alexander Rösner (CEO)
- Number of employees: 300 (2020)
- Website: gameforge.com

Gameforge AG is a German video game development studio headquartered in Karlsruhe that specializes in online games. The company is wholly owned by the Rösner Holding GmbH holding company.

The company's portfolio contains client-based massively multiplayer online games (MMOGs) such as Metin2, Runes of Magic, and AION, as well as browser-based online games such as OGame, Gladiatus, BiteFight, Ikariam, Tanoth and WildGuns. They also operate mobile games. Gameforge employs a staff of over 300 and was founded by its chief executive officer Alexander Rösner and former CEO Klaas Kersting in 2003.

== Business model ==
Gameforge was one of the first European companies to offer its games using a free-to-play business model. Game access and clients are mostly free of charge. The products are financed by shop systems where players can buy comfort and service functions such as mounts to ride, or equipment and personalisations for money. Gameforge was one of the first western companies to adapt to this business model that has its origins in Asia.

== History ==
The company was founded in December 2003 under the name of Gameforge GmbH in Karlsruhe by Alexander Rösner and Klaas Kersting. One of the company's first titles was OGame which Alexander Rösner had developed prior to the company foundation all by himself. In September 2006, the company's legal structure was converted into an incorporated company which took the name Gameforge AG. It functions as a holding of the affiliated company Gameforge 4D GmbH. Gameforge currently operates and markets client-based online games, browser games, Single-player video games and Casual Games.

=== 2003 to 2010 ===
The years from 2006 to 2010 were characterised by a strong growth in the number of players and employees.

In 2007, the company had about 100 employees; the number increased to 200 by the end of 2008, to 360 by the end of 2009 and finally, to 450 in 2010 (650 including those from Frogster Interactive Pictures AG). In November 2011, the company announced a realignment of internal structures. Following the integration of Gameforge and Frogster's operating units, "Client Games" and "Web Games" were replaced with "Development" and "Publishing" sections. In addition to structural measures, the workforce was reduced and products that were not meeting expectations were adjusted. In 2009, the company reached the mark of millions of registered players.

In 2007, Gameforge founded its first foreign branch, Gameforge SARL, established in Paris. After buying French development studio Nevrax, the subsidiary was commissioned to market the game “The Saga of Ryzom”. It was only a moderate success, leading to the sale of Ryzom in 2009.

Gameforge owned other offices abroad, including Gameforge Holding Malta Ltd. with headquarters in Pietà. In November 2007, Gameforge ventured into the U.S. market as the first German online games company and founded Gameforge Productions Inc. based in San Francisco. Lars Koschin was placed in charge of branch management overseas.

On April 23, 2008, Gameforge announced the establishment of four development studios. “Ticking Bomb Games”, based in Hamburg, was to develop several PC games, then be marketed by Gameforge. Managing directors were Tobias Severin and Marco Schultz; who both already had many years of experience in the game development field. Ralf C. Adam was introduced as a consultant, allowing it to make use of his 16 years’ professional experience. Their first game, Gilde1400, a browser game based on PC game “The Guild”, was released late October 2009. The beta phase ran for two weeks before it was published. The end of January 2009 brought the establishment of the second developer, “Rough Sea Games”, based in Mannheim, Germany. Just like Ticking Bomb, the studio was to take over development of PC and browser games. Matthias Schindler was elected CEO. He had been working in the game development for 15 years. In addition to the Hamburg and Mannheim studios, the company also co-operated with two other development studios: “Steroid Interactive” (Mainz) and “Inflammables” (Heidelberg). All four studios were gradually decommissioned: the offices in Hamburg, Mainz and Mannheim were sold on 1 January 2011; Inflammables closed with the end of Hellbreed in late 2011. At the end of 2008, the foundation of a subsidiary in the United States together with Frogster Interactive Pictures AG was unveiled. Gameforge was to be the primary stakeholder with 75 percent and following the purchase of 470,000 shares it was to then have acquired a stake of up to 20 percent from Frogster. However this joint venture was not achieved: conflicts of interest arose regarding the details. The company chose instead to become active with its own subsidiary, Frogster America Inc.

In 2008, Gameforge won the Red Herring 100 Europe Award as the only German game company. Additionally, the two founders and former CEOs Klaas Kersting and Alexander Rösner were elected entrepreneurs of the year in 2008.

=== 2010s ===
On March 19, 2010, Klaas Kersting, former CEO of Gameforge AG, announced his departure from the company.

During 2010 Gameforge took a majority stake in Frogster Interactive Pictures AG, further expanding its share. On July 3, 2012, a rebranding of its subsidiary Frogster Interactive Pictures AG and associated subsidiary companies was announced. Frogster was renamed Gameforge Berlin AG, subsidiary Frogster Online Gaming GmbH was merged into Gameforge Berlin AG. Frogster America Inc. was renamed to Gameforge America Inc. Frogster Pacific GmbH to Gameforge Pacific GmbH.

Starting 2011, an increasing saturation of the entire industry began to spread. Though sales still made up EUR 133 million in 2010, in 2011 it rose only to EUR 140 million. This was despite the number of players rising by a third from 200 million (August 2010) to 300 million (August 2011). The result was the dismissal of 100 employees in November 2011, as well as the shutdown of recently launched games Hellbreed and Mythos. Production of the much-anticipated Star Trek: Infinite Space was postponed and, after an unsuccessful search for a co-publisher, finally stopped a year later. Frogster even had a sales decline of 16% on the previous year. Competitors such as Zynga and Bigpoint also had similar problems, leading to layoffs and closures of subsidiaries and games.

In January 2012, Gameforge sold subsidiary Chili Entertainment GmbH to Hitfox for an undisclosed amount. The online advertising portal Ad2Games was sold with it. In the second half of 2012, Gameforge ventured into the mobile games market. This began with five "first generation" games, all very similar in gameplay. These games are free of charge to download and finance themselves via a built-in shop and micropayment system. In early 2013, Crystal Runner: The Forgotten Caves, a more complex “second generation” mobile title, was published. Players had to pay a fee for installation. Mobile games were already contributing several million euros to consolidated revenues in 2013.

Furthermore, Special Force II became the first shooter the company has ever licensed. In May 2012, the company released TERA, which started as a pay-to-play title with monthly costs for game access, and was then converted to the company's usual free-to-play model in February 2013. Until that point, all games that the company offered (with the exception of one single mobile game) were free to play and financed through micro transactions.

In November 2012, it was announced that the marketing departments of offices in Berlin and Karlsruhe were to be merged, leading to 20 jobs being cut within marketing, PR and business development. In the same month, the company announced a separation from the former CEO of Frogster Online Gaming GmbH, Seth Iorio. A closure of the Berlin site was not considered. On April 22, 2013, Gameforge revealed that the location in Berlin was to be dissolved from the 30th of September 2013. Organizational and economic motives were stated as reasons. CEO Alexander Rösner announced that the remaining 150 (approx.) employees were offered continued employment at the Karlsruhe offices.

In 2016, Gameforge announced the layoff of approximately 90 employees, mostly from its mobile division, as it shifts its focus away from the mobile platform. CEO Alexander Rösner explained that the shift was being born out of increased opportunity in the Free-to-play marketplace. Previous to the layoffs, it was reported that Gameforge was unsuccessful in the mobile market. As of July 2018, the company employs 300 people.

In the summer of 2018 as well as summer of 2019, Gameforge supported the Schlosslichtspiele of Karlsruhe as a Main Partner and got to use the palace's facade as a giant canvas projecting digital artwork enjoyed by hundreds of thousands of guests that visited the palace grounds.

=== 2020 onwards ===
During the COVID-19 pandemic, Gameforge transitioned its operations to remote work within a short period of time. According to company representatives, the shift was implemented over the course of a few days without major disruption to ongoing operations. In subsequent years, the company adopted a permanent hybrid work model, allowing employees to work both remotely and from the office.

In interviews with German media, including coverage by ka-news.de, Chief Officer Tomas Burck stated that the company experienced increased player activity during the pandemic, reflecting broader growth trends in the video game industry. Burck emphasized the social role of online games during this period, describing gaming as “a social activity” that enabled interaction despite physical distancing.

Gameforge has received multiple recognitions as a workplace in Germany, including awards in the Great Place to Work competition, which evaluates companies based on employee surveys and workplace culture criteria.

In 2022, Gameforge celebrated the 20th anniversary of its browser game OGame, one of the company’s longest-running titles. As part of its continued development, the game received major content updates, including the introduction of the “Lifeforms” feature, which expanded gameplay systems. The title was also made available on mobile platforms, extending its accessibility beyond browser-based play.

The company continued to support and expand its long-running MMORPG portfolio. Metin2 received the “Conquerors of Yohara” expansion, followed by further updates including “Tyranny of Aamon”, which introduced additional regions, systems, and gameplay content. NosTale continued to receive regular content expansions, including later acts such as “Act 10 – Dimensional Tales”.

In January 2022, Gameforge announced the company's first partnership with an indie developer, the Russian studio Sernur.Tech, to release Trigon: Space Story, a single-player roguelike video game. Six months later, Gameforge announced another partnership with Argentine developer Whiteboard Games to publish the twin-stick shooter I See Red. On August 23, 2023, Whiteboard Games announced that it would part ways with Gameforge as the PC publisher of the game.

In July 2023, Gameforge published the single-player video game Tiny Thor on Steam, followed by a release on Nintendo Switch in August 2023. In the same year, the company also published the hidden object game Hidden Kitten on Steam.

=== Recent developments ===
Gameforge has continued to focus on the long-term operation and expansion of its live-service portfolio. Several of its legacy titles have received ongoing updates and anniversary content.

OGame continued to receive major updates, including additional expansions to gameplay systems following the introduction of Lifeforms, as well as anniversary events marking over two decades of continuous operation. The game remains actively supported across browser and mobile platforms.

Metin2 received further content updates following the “Conquerors of Yohara” expansion, including the “Tyranny of Aamon” update, which expanded the game world with new regions, dungeons, gear slots, enemies, and progression systems.

NosTale has continued its episodic content model with additional acts and updates extending the game’s storyline and gameplay systems.

AION and Aion Classic also continued to receive updates, including the “AION Classic 4.5 – Ignite” update, which introduced additional content and gameplay systems, including an entirely new playable class.

Gameforge has also revisited parts of its legacy browser game portfolio. Titles such as Tanoth and WildGuns were reintroduced or revitalized following community demand, reflecting continued interest in classic browser-based games.

In addition to maintaining its live-service portfolio, Gameforge has expanded its publishing activities through partnerships with independent studios. Upcoming titles include Shelf Heroes, a roguelite first-person shooter developed by Fun Punch Games and featured at the Future Games Show, and Under a Rock, an open-world survival crafting game developed by Nordic Trolls.

Both titles were announced for release on Steam and are part of Gameforge’s broader initiative to collaborate with indie developers under its publishing division. Shelf Heroes is planned for release in Early Access, while Under a Rock is being developed as a cooperative survival experience with ongoing community feedback during development.

Under a Rock has also attracted significant attention on Steam prior to release, with publicly reported wishlist figures exceeding 400,000 users, indicating strong early interest in the title.

== Awards ==
In the years 2008 and 2009, Gameforge won the Technology Fast 50 Award. While Gameforge won the award in the category "Rising Stars" in 2008, the company was already entered in the normal category in 2009 and was able to reach second place with a 5-year growth of 6,261.19 or 19 percent, more than 2,000 percent ahead of Bigpoint GmbH, its closest competitor. Likewise, Gameforge won two Stevie Awards as the "Most Innovative Company of the Year in Europe" and "Best New Product or Service of the Year - Media & Entertainment " in 2009 and was able to prevail against Bigpoint. In the same year, the company won the "Technology Pioneer" award presented by the World Economic Forum Davos. In 2010, Gameforge was named "TOP JOB: Top Employer" and "Great Place to Work" in the context of "100 Best Companies to Work for in Germany 2010".

In 2011, “Computerwoche” placed Alexander Rösner at number 42 of the 100 "most important figures in the German IT". In addition, Gameforge won a "Stevie International Business Award" for the games portal Gameforge.com as well as a "Distinguished Honoree" award for the Star Trek: Infinite Space trailer.

In 2012, further awards followed, with the Red Herring Award and the Silver Award at the International Business Awards (Stevies)

In 2019, Gameforge was found among the winners of the year's Great Place to Work® competition for the Best Employers in Baden-Württemberg as well as one of the best ITC companies in Germany and received the Great Place to Work® certification.

In 2023, Gameforge was again one of the year's winners of the Great Place to Work® competition for the Best Employers in Baden-Württemberg as well as one of the best ITC companies in Germany.

== Current games ==
Game	Type	Developer	Thematic universe	Player avatar	Product Community Manager
4Story	Client game	Zemi Interactive	Fantasy	Feline, Human, or Fairy	Pinky & Melione
AION	Client game	NCSOFT	Fantasy	Human	Drestam & Celes
BattleKnight	Browser game	Gameforge	Medieval	Human	Paso
BiteFight	Browser game	Gameforge	Fantasy	A vampire or a Werewolf	Mika
Elsword	Client game	KOG Studios	Fantasy	Defined characters	Badidol & Art
Gladiatus	Browser game	Gameforge	Classical antiquity	A Gladiator	Nightmare
Hidden Kitten	Client game	PRODUKTIVKELLER Studios	Hidden Object / Casual Puzzle	Observer	
Ikariam	Browser game	Gameforge	Classical antiquity	An Emperor	Badidol
KingsAge	Browser game	Gameforge	Medieval	A King	Nightmare
Metin2	Client game	Webzen	Fantasy	Warrior, Ninja, Shaman, Sura, or Lycan	Grimnir, Web & Kizuna
NosTale	Client game	Entwell Co., Ltd.	Fantasy	A class-based warrior	Daveius & Zenitsusan
OGame	Browser game	Gameforge	Science fiction space opera	Galactic Emperor	Pinky & Prongs
Runes of Magic	Client game	Runewaker Entertainment	Fantasy	Dwarf, Elf, or Human	Darcoon & Celes
Shelf Heroes	Client game	Fun Punch Games	Toy-world / Fantasy	Toy-Heroes	WaffleMacchiato
Tanoth	Browser game	Gameforge	Fantasy	Human	Lord Syrio
Tiny Thor	Client game	Asylum Square	Retro	Thor	Threea
Trigon: Space Story	Client game	Sernur.tech	Science fiction	Captain of a spaceship	
Under A Rock	Client Game	Nordic Trolls	Survival	Human	Threea
WildGuns	Browser game	Gameforge	Wild West	Cowboy, Mexican, Native American	Melione
