= Puzzle & Dragons X =

Game and anime television series

- Puzzle & Dragons X key visual

パズドラクロス (Pazudora Kurosu)
- Genre: Adventure, fantasy
- Anime television series
- Directed by: Hajime Kamegaki
- Produced by: Nobuyuki Hosoya; Shuichi Fujimura; Masashi Matsui; Tetsuya Endo
- Written by: Dai Satō; Story Riders
- Music by: Kousuke Yamashita
- Studio: Pierrot
- Licensed by: NA: Funimation
- Original network: TV Tokyo, TVA, BS Japan
- Original run: July 4, 2016 – March 26, 2018
- Episodes: 89
- Video game

Puzzle & Dragons X: Gods Chapter/Dragons Chapter
- Developer: GungHo Online Entertainment
- Publisher: GungHo Online Entertainment
- Music by: Akira Yamaoka; Kenji Ito; Keigo Ozaki; Yuzo Koshiro
- Genre: Puzzle
- Platform: Nintendo 3DS
- Released: JP: July 28, 2016

Puzzle & Dragons X (パズドラクロス, Pazudora Kurosu) is a spinoff of the mobile game Puzzle & Dragons for the Nintendo 3DS by GungHo Online Entertainment. It was released in two versions simultaneously on July 28, 2016; the Gods Chapter (神の章, Kami no Shō) and the Dragons Chapter (龍の章, Ryū no Shō). An anime adaptation by Pierrot aired from July 4, 2016, to March 26, 2018.

== Plot ==
The story takes place in a fantasy world inhabited by humans, dragonoids and monsters, who live in relative harmony. There are also Drops, spherical objects from the planet which can power up Monsters. Humans and dragonoids can become Dragon Callers if they have the ability to see the Drops, which allows them to form bonds with Monsters. Currently, the planet is experiencing Drop Impacts, phenomena where a large amount of Drops are suddenly generated in a single area and can spread, affecting the area and causing Monsters to go berserk. One of the main duties of Dragon Callers is to stop Drop Impacts by stabilizing the Drop distribution.

The plot follows Ace, who aspires to become a Dragon Caller like his father King, who has gone missing. His journey begins when he begins to see the Drops and finds an egg of a Tamadra, an almost extinct species. Soon after, he moves to Dragoza, a region that once belonged to the dragonoids, but is now home to many Dragon Callers. Over the course of the series, he befriends Charo, Tiger, and other Dragon Callers and encounters the Ancients, hybrids of dragonoids and humans who are leaders watching over the six regions of Dragoza, and Lance, a dragonoid and a Dragon Caller who believes the dragonoids will save the planet. Their main goal is to uncover the cause of the Drop Impacts and save the planet; however, the dragonoids are suppressing humans, believing that only they can inhabit Dragoza and become Dragon Callers, and the only ones who can save the planet.

== Characters ==
=== Main characters ===
Ace (エース, Ēsu)
Voiced by: Takuto Yoshinaga (Japanese); Jessie James Grelle (English)
He is the son of Rena and King, who went missing prior to the events of the series, and aspires to be a Dragon Caller like him. He is kindhearted and values justice, and initially does not get along with Lance, respecting him but calling him a "show-off" early on in the series. However, over the course of the series, his powers grow stronger and he becomes able to fight on par with Lance. He has dragonoid blood through his grandmother, giving him the ability to fuse with his monsters to become stronger. In this form, he is shown to have a red left eye. Initially, he is unable to control his power and goes berserk, but later on becomes able to control it to an extent. His monsters are Tamazo, Ouka, Mystic Dark Knight, which evolves to Dark Dragon Knight, Blue Troll, White Dragon, Leviathian and Brave X Dragon, which he obtains from King. He has three Soul Armours - Ancient Dragon Knight, Horus, and Ra.
Lance (ランス, Ransu)
Voiced by: Tetsuya Kakihara (Japanese); Justin Briner (English)
A mysterious and aloof dragonoid and Ace's rival, who is known as the "Prince of Ice" and considered a prodigy Dragon Caller. He respects and looks up to Jest, to the point that he is unwilling to consider questioning Jest or his actions. He holds firm pride in the dragonoid and the Guild, and struggles to accept Ace because he is human. At first, he is indifferent to Ace, merely caring that he had the tamadra he had been sent to find. However, over the course of the series, he comes to respect Ace, being grateful for the opportunity to fight him during the Battle Cup. As a child, Lance's village was destroyed and his parents were killed in a Drop Impact. He grew up as an orphan under both Devi's and the Guild's care before Vahaton adopted him after Daphness picked him up to become a Dragon Caller. Lance harbors hatred towards the person who caused the village's destruction, and as a result of believing that King was responsible, he succumbs to the power of the Star Fragment and falls under Jest's control. He has several monsters under his command, including Pierdrawn and Plesios. His Soul Armour is Dragon Lord Zaerog.
Charo (チャロ, Charo)
Voiced by: Yuka Terasaki (Japanese); Apphia Yu (English)
One of Ace's friends from Dragoza, who seeks to become a Dragon Caller like him, but is often made fun of because some assume he cannot see Drops. He is friendly and has keen observation, and is also skilled with technology, using a tablet to relay information. He becomes frustrated during the Drop Impact in Crocus City due to his inability to see the Drops and protect himself when Lance saves him. However, he later becomes able to see the drops and becomes a Dragon Caller alongside Ace. He respects Torlie and is supportive of him when he is chosen to be a candidate to become an Ancient. His monster partner is Enju and he has a Toyceratops Soul Armor.
Tamazo (タマゾー, Tamazō)
Voiced by: Tomoko Kaneda (Japanese); Alexis Tipton (English)
Ace's partner. A tamadra who arrived to him in the form of an egg with a star on it and, along with Devi, is seemingly the last of his kind. Despite often arguing with Devi and being childish and clueless, he serves as a guide to Ace in his quest to develop his skills as a Dragon Caller. He takes the form of Odin Tamazo when fighting, and later acquires Hino Kagustuchi as a Soul Armour.
Devi (デビ, Debi)
Voiced by: Chika Sakamoto (Japanese); Tia Ballard (English)
Lance's partner. An arrogant devidra who refers to Lance as his "Master" and will do anything to protect him and often argues with Tamazo. The Ancient of Darkness, Daphness, assigned him to keep an eye on Lance and Jest. It is later revealed that Devi was abandoned by his previous owner and that he has been with Lance since childhood, when Lance picked his egg. The Guild later takes Lance away from him, but they are soon reunited. Devi takes the form of Devivebub when he does a Cross On.
Tiger (タイガー, Taigā)
Voiced by: Anri Katsu (Japanese); Clifford Chapin (English)
One of Ace's friends from Dragoza.
Garnet (ガーネット, Gānetto)
Voiced by: Nanami Yamashita (Japanese); Jad Saxton (English)
A Dragon Caller who seeks to be an idol. Although she is stubborn and likes to mock Ace, Charo and Tiger, she does care for them. She knew Lance and Sonia in the past and is mentored by Herriot. She has Valkyrie Soul Armour.

=== Ancients ===
Eldora (エルドラ, Erudora)
Voiced by: Wakana Yamazaki (Japanese); Trina Nishimura (English)
The Ancient of Fire.
Lukes (ルークス, Rūkusu)
Voiced by: Yōsuke Akimoto (Japanese); Mark Stoddard (English)
The former Ancient of Light.
Jest (ジェスト, Jesuto)
Voiced by: Koji Yusa (Japanese); Jerry Jewell (English)
The current Ancient of Light and one of the main antagonists of the series. He is the mysterious head of the Guild, who seeks prosperity for both humans and dragonoids and aids Ace in his journey. However, in reality he is using Ace as a means to help Lance become stronger, and it is implied that he is manipulating Lance and preying on his feelings of dragonoid superiority to convince him to join him. Additionally, episode 54 implies that he may have been involved in the Drop Impact that killed Lance's parents. Jest also tries to kill Ace by luring him to the site of a Drop Impact, but he is saved by Jest's counterpart, the Ancient of Darkness, Daphness.
Vahaton (ヴァハトン, Vuahaton)
Voiced by: Minoru Inaba (Japanese); Charlie Campbell (English)
The Ancient of Water and Lance's adoptive father. Despite Lance being isolated from Vahaton, it is shown he respects his opinions, as he is jealous when Vahaton praises Ace's skills and progress.
Timbel (ティンベル, Tinberu)
Voiced by: Ikuo Nishikawa (Japanese); Jim White (English)
The former Ancient of Wood, who chooses Torlie and Klein as candidates for becoming the next Ancient of Wood. However, it is implied that he wanted Torlie to become the Ancient rather than Klein.
Daphness (ダフネス, Dafunesu)
Voiced by: Junko Minagawa (Japanese); Colleen Clinkenbeard (English)
The Ancient of Darkness, who is cold-hearted but well-meaning and values justice. She was responsible for taking Lance from Devi and putting him in the Guild's care under her and Vahaton's supervision. She also tasked Devi with keeping an eye on Lance and later saves Ace when Jest leads him into a trap.

=== Dragonoids ===
Sonia (ソニア, Sonia)
Voiced by: Sora Amamiya (Japanese); Sarah Wiedenheft (English)
Nyudo (ニュード, Nyūdo)
Voiced by: Tomokazu Sugita (Japanese); Ian Sinclair (English)
A worker for the SDF.
Herriot (ヘリオット, Heriotto)
Voiced by: Akeno Watanabe (Japanese); Jamie Marchi (English)
Morgan's sister and Garnet's master.
Morgan (モルガン, Morugan)
Voiced by: Miyuki Sawashiro (Japanese); Monica Rial (English)
Herriot's sister.
Kroell (クロエル, Kuroeru)
Voiced by: Tatsuhisa Suzuki (Japanese); Joel McDonald (English)

=== Other characters ===
Haru (ハル)
Voiced by: Marina Inoue (Japanese); Dawn M. Bennett (English)
Ace's childhood friend.
Lena (レナ, Rena)
Voiced by: Aya Hisakawa (Japanese); Sara Ragsdale (English)
Ace's mother.
King (キング, Kingu)
Voiced by: Yuichi Nakamura (Japanese); David Matranga (English)
Ace's father and Lena's husband. He is a famous Dragon Caller, who went missing prior to the events of the series.
Angine (アンジーヌ, Anjīnu)
Voiced by: Ai Orikasa (Japanese); Rachel Robinson (English)
Ace's grandmother. Following the Battle Cup final, she reveals to Ace that she is a dragonoid.
Torlie (トーリエ, Tōrie)
Voiced by: Takahiro Mizushima (Japanese); Micah Solusod (English)
Timbel's student and the current Ancient of Wood following his death.
Yamaki (ヤマキ)
Voiced by: Keiji Himeno (Japanese); Kent Williams (English)
The commander of the SDF and one of the main antagonists of the series.
Sturgeon (スタージョン, Sutājon)
Voiced by: Chisa Yokoyama (Japanese); Greg Ayres (English)
Logan (ローガン, Rōgan)
Voiced by: Dai Matsumoto (Japanese); David Wald (English)

== Anime ==
An anime by Pierrot based on the game premiered on TV Tokyo on July 4, 2016, and aired until March 26, 2018, across two seasons. It is directed by Hajime Kamegaki, with Masaru Sato as script writer, and Yamashita Kosuke as music producer. The opening theme is "WE ARE GO" by UVERworld, while the ending theme is "ColorFULLCombo!" (カラーFULLコンボ！) by Shiori Tomita. Starting from episode 27, "Colors" by Lenny Code Fiction is used as the opening theme, while "Puzzle" by Natsume Mito is used as the ending theme, but did not debut until Episode 30. From episode 52, "Montage" by Porno Graffitti is used as the opening theme and "Colorful Jump" by J*Dee'Z is used as the ending theme.

Funimation began streaming the anime in North America from July 4, 2016, along with a broadcast dub. However, as of April 3, 2017, due to an unknown licensing issue between Funimation and GungHo, no other episodes after episode 38 were available on streaming services and the dub went on hiatus. As of October 30, 2017, Crunchyroll resumed streaming the series starting with episode 39, but did not confirm if the English dub would return.
