= Cho Aniki Zero =

2009 video game

- Japanese box art
- Developers: extreme Co., Ltd.
- Publishers: JP: GungHo Works, Inc.; NA: Aksys Games
- Composer: Kouji Hayama
- Series: Cho Aniki
- Platforms: PlayStation Portable, Android
- Release: JP: March 19, 2009; NA: March 25, 2010
- Genre: Horizontal scrolling shooter
- Mode: Single player

Cho Aniki Zero (零・超兄貴, Zero Chō Aniki; lit. "Zero Super Big Brother") is a horizontally scrolling shoot 'em up, the latest console game in the Cho Aniki series. It was published in Japan by GungHo Works on 19 March 2009 for the PlayStation Portable. The game was published in North America by Aksys Games on 25 March 2010 as a digital download exclusive for the PSP, with the full title of Cho Aniki Zero: Muscle Brothers. This makes it the second Cho Aniki title to be released in North America, following the Virtual Console port of the original game. It is the first Cho Aniki title developed by extreme Co., Ltd., who had obtained the rights of original developers NCS Corp. and Masaya products. The graphics followed the 3D appearance of the PS2 game.

A limited edition was released in Japan, which includes a soundtrack CD. Also released was a demo that included the first stage of the game.

== Gameplay ==
=== Fighters ===
- Idaten
- Benten
- Shoten

=== Option characters ===
- Adon
- Samson
- Mika & Eru

=== Items ===
- Protein: Increases shot power (max 5)
- Bomb Bomb Protein: Increases bomb stock

=== Control ===
During the Men's beam firing sequence, the player can choose their beam level during countdown.

The cut-in bomb attacks all on-screen enemies, and destroys all enemy bullets.

== Reception ==
Reception

Review score
Publication	Score
IGN	5.9/10

Kurt Kalata for Hardcore Gaming 101 called the game mediocre, criticizing the high amount of hits to defeat an enemy.
