= Let It Die (video game) =

2016 video game

- Developer: Grasshopper Manufacture (Note: Developed by Supertrick Games from 2022.)
- Publisher: GungHo Online Entertainment
- Director: Hideyuki Shin
- Producer: Shuji Ishikawa
- Designer: Noriaki Kazama
- Artist: Takashi Kasahara
- Writer: Muga Takeda
- Composer: Akira Yamaoka
- Engine: Unreal Engine 3
- Platforms: PlayStation 4; Microsoft Windows
- Release: PlayStation 4: WW: December 3, 2016; JP: February 2, 2017; Windows: WW: September 26, 2018
- Genres: Hack and slash, Roguelike
- Mode: Single-player

Let It Die (Note: Japanese: レット・イット・ダイ, Hepburn: Retto Itto Dai) is a free-to-play online hack and slash video game developed by Grasshopper Manufacture and published by GungHo Online Entertainment. The game was released for the PlayStation 4 in December 2016, and in Japan in February 2017. It was released for Microsoft Windows in September 2018.

A battle royale game sequel, Deathverse: Let It Die, was announced in October 2021 and had a limited time beta test in May and June 2022 on the PlayStation 5 and Windows. It was developed by Supertrick Games, a game studio spun off of Grasshopper Manufacture, who developed the original game.

A sequel titled Let It Die: Inferno was announced at the 2025 PlayStation State of Play on September 24, 2025, with a release date of December 3, 2025 for the PlayStation 5 and Windows.

In March 2026, it was announced that Let It Die would shut down its servers in the fall of that year, and shift to an offline version accessible through paid DLC.

== Gameplay ==
Under the supervision of a skateboarding grim reaper called Uncle Death, players fight through a treacherous tower, obtaining various types of weapons and armor while finding creatures and mushrooms to eat in order to stay alive. Upon death, a player's "death data" is circulated among other player's games where they will appear as formidable opponents. The sharing of death data is one of the various asynchronous multiplayer elements that in the game.

== Development ==
Let It Die was originally known as Lily Bergamo. Its initial plot focused on a female protagonist called Tae Ioroi and was set in the year 2026. The game's world drew from both Japanese and Western cultures. It was described as a "super action game" or an "extreme action game". The game was supposed to feature an "element of growth", in that by gradually accumulating experience, the player's data is updated more and more rapidly. Lily Bergamo would have featured online play and features.

In addition to the game, Lily Bergamo would feature a "companion app", which would be playable on smartphones. The game would feature online play, and according to GungHo Online Entertainment's CEO Kazuki Morishita, would allow "both smartphone and PlayStation gamers to be in the same world”. According to Morishita, Grasshopper Manufacture "wants to make the most out of the strengths of online play, and the idea of using smartphones to play has been a big deal”, with the goal of the app being the ability for players "to completely rely on their smartphones to play".

Logo of the former Lily Bergamo

Lily Bergamo was to be the first game to be developed by Grasshopper Manufacture after it was acquired by GungHo Online Entertainment. Grasshopper Manufacture founder and executive director Goichi Suda stated that Lily Bergamo was conceived after GungHo CEO Kazuki Morishita expressed his desire to "make a game that leverages the inherent flavor of both companies." The game was revealed in April 2013, and in Sony Computer Entertainment's Press Conference on September 9, 2013, the release date was set to sometime in 2014. Additional information was shown at the 2013 Tokyo Game Show, including the name of the protagonist, the ability to play on smartphones and the game's setting. At the game show, a special stage event was held for Lily Bergamo, including a cosplay model dressed up as the game's protagonist Tae Ioroi, and specially-made Lily Bergamo stickers were distributed. Although the game was not playable then, Suda promised that it would be at the 2014 Tokyo Game Show instead. The game was developed by a separate team within Grasshopper, with Yusuke Kozaki as the head of character design in Lily Bergamo, along with direction by Nobutaka Ichiki and game design by Yusuke Kozaki; this team would eventually split from Grasshopper to form Supertrick Games. A trademark for Lily Bergamo had been filed in North America, which hinted at a soon-to-be confirmed release in that region and globally.

Announced on June 11, 2014, at the Electronic Entertainment Expo 2014, Lily Bergamo was changed to Let It Die; the concept of an "extreme action game" remained. The change commenced around the end of 2013. Suda explained that the concept of death is relevant throughout Let It Die, and that if one player dies in-game, they will appear in another player's game, making the deaths of players important in the experience, hence the title. Reportedly, the game would have normal AI enemies and dead player characters' avatars, and was announced as free-to-play. The game represents a huge departure from Suda's past video games in terms of creative philosophy. GungHo Online Entertainment had trademarked Lily Bergamo in the United States, hinting at a possible global release, with the reveal of Let It Die confirming it. On October 29, 2015, GungHo Online Entertainment announced that Let It Die had been delayed, and that it would now launch in 2016 instead of its originally planned 2015 release window. On December 3, 2016, Let It Die was released for free on PlayStation Network in North America and Europe.

Let It Die featured 100 Japanese artists in the rock and metal music genres curated by Silent Hill series game music composer Akira Yamaoka, who described the work as a "one-of-a-kind musical experience".

In 2025, GungHo Online Entertainment and Supertrick Games announced an offline version of the game, in response to demand from fans. In March 2026, it was announced that the online servers would be shut down around September 1, 2026 and the game would shift to an offline mode. Current players will be able to transfer their data to the offline version through a paid DLC, while new players will pay a one-time purchase fee. All premium currency and PVP modes will be removed or replaced with in-game currency and PVE modes.

== Reception ==
Reception

Aggregate score
Aggregator	Score
Metacritic	(PS4) 72/100

Review scores
Publication	Score
Destructoid	6/10
Game Informer	7.75/10
IGN	6.4/10

Let It Die received "mixed or average" reviews, according to video game review aggregator Metacritic. In February 2017, it was announced that the game has been downloaded over two million times. By April 2018, that number had risen to over four million. In March 2020, it was announced that the game has over six million downloads.
