= OGame =

2002 video game

- Screenshot of the homepage
- Developer: Gameforge AG
- Engine: PHP, AJAX
- Platform: Web browser
- Release: October 3, 2002
- Genre: Real-time browser-based MMO

OGame is a browser-based, strategy and space-themed massively multiplayer online game developed and published by Gameforge. Originally released in 2002, it is one of the longest-running browser games and remains in active development. The game is available in multiple languages, with separate communities for different regions that share largely identical gameplay. Players are typically informed about updates, rule changes, and new features through official forums and in-game announcements.

Since 2011, OGame has undergone continuous development, including major gameplay updates and technical improvements. Notable additions include the introduction of new mechanics such as Lifeforms, which expanded progression and strategic depth, as well as avatar and profile systems that enhanced player customization and social features.

In 2022, the game celebrated its 20th anniversary with large-scale in-game events, community activities, and content updates. The game has also been made accessible on mobile platforms, allowing players to manage their empires beyond traditional web browsers.

OGame continues to operate globally with an active player base, receiving regular updates, seasonal events, and new universes, reflecting its long-term live-service model more than two decades after its original release.

== Gameplay ==
OGame is a real-time, browser-based strategy game set in space, in which players build and manage an interstellar empire. Each game server, known as a "universe", consists of multiple galaxies, solar systems, and planetary slots. Typically, universes contain up to nine galaxies, each with several hundred systems, and each system includes multiple planetary positions that can be colonized by players.

Players begin with a single home planet at randomly assigned coordinates. From there, they expand their empire by constructing buildings, researching technologies, building fleets, and colonizing additional planets. Planetary development is limited by available building space, which can be expanded through specific upgrades.

Gameplay revolves around the management of resources, including metal, crystal, deuterium, energy, and premium currency (dark matter). These resources can be acquired through mining, trading, expeditions, and combat with other players. Fleets can be dispatched for missions such as attacks, transport, espionage, colonization, and expeditions into deep space.

Players are ranked based on accumulated points, which are earned through investment in buildings, research, fleets, and defensive structures. The game features both player-versus-environment (PvE) and player-versus-player (PvP) elements, with combat outcomes determined by fleet composition, research levels, and tactical decisions.

Since 2011, OGame has introduced several new gameplay systems that expanded its strategic depth. One of the most significant additions is the Lifeforms system, which allows players to unlock different species, each providing unique technologies, bonuses, and progression paths that influence economic and military strategies.

Additional features include player profiles, avatars, and achievement systems, which enable customization and provide long-term progression goals beyond traditional empire building.

The game also includes alliance systems, allowing players to form groups for cooperation, coordinated warfare, and resource sharing. Regular events, seasonal content, and new universe configurations are introduced to maintain variety and ongoing player engagement.

OGame can be played through web browsers as well as mobile devices, allowing players to manage their empires across multiple platforms.

=== Combat ===
Combat in OGame is resolved automatically when opposing fleets or planetary defenses encounter each other. Unlike many real-time strategy games, players do not directly control units during battle. Instead, fleets are dispatched to target coordinates, and engagements are calculated upon arrival based on fleet composition, research levels, and defensive structures.

Battles take place instantly and consist of up to six combat rounds. During each round, ships and defenses exchange fire according to predefined combat mechanics. The outcome determines whether fleets are destroyed, partially survive, or retreat.

A primary objective of combat is resource acquisition through raiding, in which players attack other planets to steal resources. In addition, players may engage in combat to destroy opposing fleets, creating debris fields composed of metal and crystal that can be harvested for further resources.

Planetary defenses can be constructed to protect resources and infrastructure. A portion of destroyed defensive structures is automatically rebuilt after combat, whereas destroyed ships are permanently lost.

Since later updates, combat has been influenced by additional gameplay systems, including technological advancements and features such as Lifeforms, which introduce modifiers and bonuses that can affect fleet performance, resource efficiency, and strategic outcomes.

Combat also plays a central role in alliance-based gameplay, where coordinated attacks and defensive strategies between multiple players are used to gain advantages within a universe.

=== Alliances ===
Alliances are groups of players who cooperate for strategic, economic, and defensive purposes. Members can coordinate attacks, share resources, and support each other against hostile players. Alliances also provide communication tools such as internal messages and shared pages.

Modern alliance systems include coordinated fleet actions, allowing multiple players to synchronize attacks or defenses. In some universes, alliance members can temporarily station fleets on allied planets and participate in joint combat operations. Diplomacy between alliances, including wars and truces, is typically organized through in-game systems and official community platforms.

=== Lifeforms ===
The Lifeforms system, introduced in later updates, represents one of the most significant gameplay expansions in OGame. It allows players to unlock and develop different alien species, each providing unique technologies, bonuses, and strategic advantages.

Players can select from multiple lifeform types, each with its own technology tree and specialization. These technologies enhance various aspects of gameplay, including resource production, fleet performance, research efficiency, and defensive capabilities.

Lifeforms introduce an additional layer of progression beyond traditional research, enabling players to tailor their empire toward economic growth, military strength, or hybrid strategies. The system also adds new buildings and mechanics tied to lifeform development, further expanding long-term gameplay depth.

=== Merchants ===
Players can hire a merchant using dark matter to trade one resource type for another. The amount of resources traded is limited to the amount of free space in one's storage buildings and the amount of dark matter the player has.

=== Officers ===
OGame includes optional officers that provide gameplay bonuses. These can be activated using dark matter, a premium currency.

Available officers include the Engineer, Geologist, Technocrat, and Fleet Admiral, each improving specific aspects such as resource production, research speed, or fleet capacity. The Commander role provides additional interface features, including improved management tools, overview screens, and automation options for construction and fleet handling.

=== Resources ===
The game’s economy is based on three primary resources: metal, crystal, and deuterium. These are produced through planetary mines and are required for constructing buildings, researching technologies, and building fleets and defenses.

Energy is required to operate mines and can be generated through solar plants, solar satellites, or fusion reactors. Efficient energy management is essential for maintaining production levels.

Deuterium also serves as fuel for fleets, making it a critical resource for large-scale operations and long-distance missions.

Dark matter functions as a premium currency and can be obtained in small amounts through gameplay activities such as expeditions, or purchased directly. It is used for various convenience features, including activating officers and accessing merchants.

=== Expeditions ===
Expeditions allow players to send fleets into unexplored regions beyond their current systems. These missions can yield resources, ships, or dark matter, but may also involve risks such as hostile encounters or fleet losses.

The effectiveness and outcomes of expeditions depend on fleet composition and research levels.

=== Moons ===
Moons can form from large debris fields created after battles. Their creation is based on probability, with larger debris fields increasing the chance of formation.

Moons provide strategic advantages, including access to unique structures such as the Jump Gate, which enables instantaneous fleet travel between moons, and the Sensor Phalanx, which allows players to monitor fleet movements within a certain range.

Due to their limited building space, moons require careful planning but are essential for advanced gameplay strategies.

=== Events and seasonal content ===
OGame features regular events and seasonal content, including anniversary celebrations, time-limited challenges, and special universes with modified rulesets. These events often provide bonuses such as increased resource production, faster progression, or unique rewards.

Community-driven activities, including competitions and in-game milestones, are also periodically organized to maintain player engagement.
