= Ragnarok Odyssey =

2012 video game

- Developer: Game Arts
- Publishers: WW: GungHo Online Entertainment; NA: Marvelous USA
- Composers: Kumi Tanioka; Nobuo Uematsu
- Series: Ragnarok series
- Platforms: PlayStation Vita, PlayStation 3
- Release: Ragnarok Odyssey: JP: February 2, 2012; TW: August 16, 2012; KOR: August 21, 2012; NA: October 30, 2012; PAL: February 20, 2013; Ragnarok Odyssey Ace (PS3 and PS Vita): JP/TW: August 29, 2013; NA: April 1, 2014; PAL: April 30, 2014
- Genre: Role-playing
- Modes: Single-player, multiplayer

Ragnarok Odyssey (Note: Japanese: ラグナロクオデッセイ, Hepburn: Ragunaroku Odessei) is a role-playing video game developed by Game Arts and published by GungHo Online Entertainment for the PlayStation Vita. It is based on the universe of Lee Myung-jin's manhwa Ragnarok and its MMORPG adaptation Ragnarok Online, containing many elements of Norse mythology. It was released in February 2012 within Japan, August 21, 2012 in South Korea, October 30, 2012 in North America and February 20, 2013 in Europe. An updated version titled Ragnarok Odyssey Ace was released for the PlayStation Vita and PlayStation 3.

== Gameplay ==
Ragnarok Odyssey is a real-time action RPG in similar vein to the series Monster Hunter. The game retains many elements typical of RPGs, such as health and magic, item collecting/crafting, interaction with NPCs and a class system but no leveling system. Missions in Odyssey are received at guild halls and usually consist of collecting items or killing enemies.

There are six interchangeable classes players may pick from; the Sword Warrior, Hammersmith, Mage, Assassin, Hunter and Cleric with their own individual advantages and weaknesses. Instead of a typical leveling system, Odyssey uses a Card System. Cards can be equipped to a character's clothing/armor to provide statistic boosts and class-specific abilities. Upgraded clothing/armor can have an increased Card Capacity and hence can equip higher cost/additional cards. Cards are found in shops or dropped by defeated enemies.

== Ragnarok Odyssey Ace ==
Ragnarok Odyssey Ace is an updated version of Ragnarok Odyssey developed for the PlayStation Vita and PlayStation 3. This new version of the game contains all the DLC from the original game, as well as new enemies, skills, dungeons HUD, gameplay balance adjustment and an extra episode after the ending. The first print copies of the game included various in-game bonus. It is also possible to import save data from the original game for use in Ragnarok Odyssey Ace.

The PlayStation Vita version was released on August 29, 2013 in Japan. Composer Nobuo Uematsu contributed one new song for Ragnarok Odyssey Ace.

== Reception ==
Reception

Aggregate score
Aggregator	Score	
Aggregator	PS Vita	PS3
Metacritic	(2) 67/100 (1) 66/100	61/100

Review scores
Publication	Score	
Publication	PS Vita	PS3
Destructoid	(1) 9/10	N/A
Electronic Gaming Monthly	N/A	3/10
Famitsu	(2) 35/40 (1) 32/40	N/A
GameRevolution	(2) 7/10	N/A
GameSpot	(2) 7/10	N/A
GamesRadar+	N/A	2.5/5
GameZone	(2) 8.5/10 (1) 8/10	8.5/10
Hardcore Gamer	(1) 4/5	3/5
IGN	(1) 5/10	N/A
PlayStation Official Magazine – UK	(1) 7/10	N/A
Pocket Gamer	3.5/5	N/A
Push Square	(1) 7/10	N/A
RPGamer	(1) 2.5/5	2.5/5
RPGFan	(1) 70%	N/A
411Mania	N/A	6/10
Digital Spy	(1) 2/5	N/A

Raganrok Odyssey and Odyssey Ace received "mixed or average reviews" on all platforms according to the review aggregation website Metacritic. The most positive of reviews came from Destructoid's James Stephanie Sterling, who praised the former version's visuals, calling it the best looking Vita game to date, fast loading screens, customization, tight controls and subtle use of the touchscreen. Famitsu gave Odyssey a score of one nine, two eights, and one seven, and later gave the Vita version of Odyssey Ace two nines, one eight, and one nine.

The Digital Fix gave Odyssey six out of ten, calling it "a perfect case of brilliant ideas that have been poorly executed." However, Digital Spy gave it two out of five, calling it "a polished offering with tight controls and nice graphics, but a little innovation would have gone a long way. In terms of both style and gameplay, this is little more than a generic RPG offering that fails to build on solid foundations." 411Mania gave the PlayStation 3 version of Odyssey Ace six out of ten, calling it a "niche game and as such will not appeal to the mass market, but if you are feeling a need for a Monster Hunter clone in the interim between releases this game will most definitely scratch that itch. I can't say this is my type of game, but some of the new additions certainly enhanced the game and made for a more enjoyable experience."

As of July 2012, Ragnarok Odyssey sold over 100,000 units in Japan. Ragnarok Odyssey Ace sold 31,622 physical retail units within the first week of release in Japan.
