= Runes of Magic =

2009 video game

- Developer: Runewaker Entertainment
- Publishers: Gameforge, Runewaker Entertainment
- Platform: Microsoft Windows
- Release: March 19, 2009
- Genres: Fantasy, MMORPG
- Mode: Multiplayer online

Runes of Magic (RoM) is a massively multiplayer online role-playing game (MMORPG) developed by the Taiwanese developer Runewaker Entertainment and adapted for the English and German-speaking market by German company Frogster Interactive. Frogster had also opened servers for France, Spain, Poland, Italy, and Australia as well as servers dedicated to the European Union. After going through an open beta phase, the game was launched on March 19, 2009. The game client is free to download, and no monthly subscription fee is required because the service is funded by real money transactions (RMT) in the Runes of Magic Item Shop.

The game was later acquired by Gameforge when the company bought 60 percent of Frogster Interactive's stake.

Controls involve tab-targeting and action bars. The main unique feature is the dual-class system, in which players use skills from two classes, along with "Elite Skills" unique to a given combination. Most of a character's attributes come from their equipment, which is mainly improved by adding "stats" from other equipment or by using "runes".

Chapter II – The Elven Prophecy was launched on September 15, 2009. The next chapter, Chapter III – The Elder Kingdoms, started April 22, 2010, however all of Chapter III did not become available until August 11, 2010. Chapter IV - Lands of Despair, was released June 16, 2011. Chapter V - Fires of Shadowforge, was released on June 12, 2012. The latest chapter is Chapter VII - Legacy of the Soulless.

== Reception ==
Reception

Aggregate score
Aggregator	Score
Metacritic	71/100

Review scores
Publication	Score
Eurogamer	6/10
GamesRadar+	2.5/5
GameTrailers	8.2/10
IGN	7.9/10
PC Gamer (UK)	48/100
PC Zone	50%
VideoGamer.com	7 out of 10

Runes of Magic won the German Game Developer Award for Best International PC Game of 2009. It also won nine awards in Massively's Reader's Choice and Staff Choice Awards in that same year,

In 2010, Runes of Magic was awarded for the second year in a row the German Game Developers Award for Best Online Game of 2010.
