= ECOST.com =

Former online retailer

eCost.com
- Industry: online retailer
- Founded: 1999; Torrance, California, United States
- Headquarters: Torrance, California, United States
- Website: Official website

eCost.com was an online retailer based in Torrance, California. Founded in 1999, the retailer sold a variety of products, such as electronics, jewelry, and household items.

The retailer was started as a subsidiary of PC Mall, Inc. in 1999. On April 11, 2005, eCost.com was spun off from PC Mall, Inc. In 2006, eCost.com was subsidized by PFSweb for US$29 million. PC Mall reacquired eCost.com for $2.3 million in February 2011. The agreement included the acquisition of roughly $1 million of eCOST's inventory. PC Mall established OnSale Inc., a new subsidiary that involved eCost in its enterprise.

On July 2, 2014, the website was shut down.
