= Metin2 =

2004 video game

- Developer: Webzen Games
- Platform: Microsoft Windows
- Release: KOR: 2004; WW: 2007
- Genre: Massively multiplayer online role-playing game

Metin2 is a massively multiplayer online role-playing game (MMORPG) developed by Ymir Entertainment and first released in South Korea in 2004. The game is published in Europe and other regions by Gameforge. It is known for its action-oriented combat system, open-world player interaction, and long-term live service support. Since its release, Metin2 has maintained an active international player base and continues to receive regular updates, expansions, and seasonal in-game events.

== Gameplay ==
Metin2 features a real-time combat system based on hack-and-slash mechanics. Players control a character from a third-person perspective and engage in combat against monsters and other players in an open world.

Progression is primarily achieved through defeating enemies and completing quests provided by non-player characters (NPCs). Experience points allow characters to level up, improving their attributes and unlocking new abilities.

The game world is divided into multiple regions, including safe zones, combat areas, and high-level zones introduced through later expansions.

Players can form guilds, participate in guild wars, and engage in player-versus-player (PvP) combat.

The in-game currency, known as Yang, is used for trading, purchasing items from NPCs, and operating player-run shops.

== Character classes ==
At the start of the game, players can choose from several character classes, each with distinct abilities and playstyles. Each class has access to two different skill trees, allowing for specialization.

Warrior – A melee-focused class with high durability and strong close-range attacks. Sura – A hybrid class combining melee combat with magical abilities. Shaman – A support-oriented class capable of healing allies and providing buffs. Ninja – A fast and agile class specializing in ranged or melee burst damage.

Each class can further develop its abilities through skill upgrades and equipment progression.

== Ranking system ==
Metin2 includes a ranking system that reflects player behavior. Players can have either a positive or negative rank, displayed visually. Positive ranks are earned through defeating monsters and maintaining lawful behavior, while negative ranks are typically acquired through attacking players of the same faction.

Ranks influence certain gameplay elements, such as vulnerability to attacks and penalties upon defeat, but primarily serve as an indicator of player conduct.

=== Player ranks and rank points ===
The ranking system has a role of visually displaying the nature of a player. A player can have a positive (colored in blue) or negative (colored in red) rank. The rank provides players with some bonuses (for positive ranks) or penalties (for negative ranks).

The categories are split into nine different sections that run on a scale from -20,000 to 20,000 points.

Rank	Rank points
Chivalric	12,000 to 20,000
Noble	8,000 to 11,999
Good	4,000 to 7,999
Friendly	1,000 to 3,999
Neutral	0 to 999
Aggressive	-1 to -3,999
Fraudulent	-4,000 to -7,999
Malicious	-8,000 to -11,999
Cruel	-12,000 to -20,000

==== Positive ranks ====
A positive rank is acquired by killing monsters with a +-9 level difference than the player. The rank points also automatically increase if a player spends time outside a safe zone.

Positive ranks range from Friendly to Chivalric. Contrary to some descriptions, a positive rank does not affect item drops or skill improvement success, it serves purely a visual purpose.

==== Negative ranks ====
A negative rank is acquired by a player if they kill other players from their empire, or are in a group where someone kills players from their empire. Another mode where a player's rank can become negative is by levelling up their skills using the Soul Stone (from G1 to P, the highest official level), where the rank points are deducted increasingly based on the level of skill.

The negative ranks begin from Aggressive and end with Cruel. When a player has a negative rank, the main penalty is that they now can be attacked by other players from their kingdom and when killed, have a chance to drop items.

=== Monetisation ===
Metin2 operates under a free-to-play model. Players can access the game without an initial purchase, while optional in-game items can be acquired through microtransactions using premium currency.

These items may provide convenience features, cosmetic changes, or gameplay advantages, depending on their function.

== Development and publishing ==
Metin2 was developed by Ymir Entertainment, which was later acquired by Webzen. The game was released in South Korea in 2004 and subsequently localized for international markets.

Gameforge became the publisher for Europe and other territories, operating regional servers and providing ongoing support, updates, and community management.

Over time, the game evolved from its original version through continuous updates, technical improvements, and expansions.

== Expansions and updates ==
Metin2 has received numerous updates since its release, contributing to its longevity as a live-service game.

During the COVID-19 pandemic, the game saw increased player activity, coinciding with the release of the major expansion Conquerors of Yohara. This expansion introduced a new high-level continent, additional dungeons, enemies, and extended progression systems aimed at experienced players.

A later large-scale update, Tyranny of Aamon, further expanded the game world by adding new regions, narrative content, equipment systems, and gameplay mechanics designed to deepen endgame progression.

In addition to major expansions, the game receives frequent content updates and system improvements.

== Events and community ==
Metin2 features regular seasonal events and in-game activities, including holiday-themed content, limited-time challenges, and promotional item giveaways. These events are designed to maintain engagement and encourage interaction within the player community.

The game has maintained an active international community for many years, supported by official forums, events, and ongoing updates.

== Legacy ==
As one of the early MMORPGs of the 2000s, Metin2 remains in active operation more than two decades after its initial release. Its continued development and regular updates reflect sustained player interest and long-term service support.
