= Emil Chronicle Online =

2005 video game

- Developer: Headlock
- Publishers: Gravity; BROCCOLI
- Composers: ACE+: CHiCO); Kenji Hiramatsu; Tomori Kudo; Greenwich Fields
- Platform: Windows
- Release: JP: November 24, 2005
- Genre: MMORPG
- Mode: Multiplayer

Emil Chronicle Online (Japanese: エミル・クロニクル・オンライン), often referred to as ECO, was a massively multiplayer online role-playing game created by Headlock and published by GungHo. It was first released in Japan on November 24, 2005 for Microsoft Windows. Gravity purchased the worldwide distribution rights for all regions except Japan from GungHo Online Entertainment Inc. in November 2005.

On December 18, 2006, Infocomm Asia Holdings licensed the game for release in Southeast Asia and Oceania. Currently, there is no set release date for this version.

On January 17, 2007, The9 licensed the game for Mainland China. On May 9, 2007, Gravity partnered with NHN Corp. to bring "Gravity Zone", a portal website which will eventually "offer up to 12 online games and "Emil Chronicle Online" will be the first online game offered through "Gravity Zone" commencing from the end of May 2007".

Run Up has obtained the distribution rights for Malaysia and Singapore from Gravity. Run Up launched the official Malaysia and Singapore web sites for the game on July 3, 2009. Run Up had a closed beta test for the game from July 8, 2009 through July 22, 2009. An Open Beta is scheduled to go live on September 30, 2009. However RunUp has decided to close down the game after one year.

For Indonesia WaveGame has obtained the distribution rights from Gravity. WaveGame had a Closed Beta Test from July 23, 2009 through August 6, 2009. The Open Beta has also gone live as of August 27, 2009. The game was also closed down after 3 years on October 4, 2012 in Indonesia.

As of 2024, no servers for the game are online, with GungHo Online Entertainment announcing that the Japanese server would be shut down on August 31, 2017, citing the impossible task of keeping up with modern players’ demands.

== Overview ==
The world of Emil Chronicle Online is divided into three realms, homelands of each of the three original races: the humans or Emils, the angel-like Titanias and the demon-like Dominions. In relation to our understanding of the worlds Titania is above the world of Emil, while Dominion is below it. The main stage is set in the land of Acronia, situated in the Emils' world, with the city of Acropolis at its centre.

In the distant future, civilization completely depleted the earth's valuable resources. In its search for new resources, worlds which were never meant to be connected were bridged. Complete chaos ensued between the three races. Humans entered into the heavens and underworlds, realms never meant for them.

From the aftermath of chaos was the emergence of a new history. There was an effort to rebuild and regroup as each race reclaimed their spot in the world.

== Gameplay ==
=== SAGAs ===
The major patches in Emil Chronicle Online are known as SAGAs. Each SAGA usually opens up a new area in the map and many introduce new systems to the game.

In SAGA 0–4, the first few main cities in the game (namely Acropolis City, Fareast City, Iron South, the Northern Kingdom and Morg City) were introduced. The whole skeleton of the main plot was determined by SAGA 4, and its many systems were also introduced here including the marionette, synthesis, job and quest systems, which are all essential to playing the game effectively.

In SAGA 5, Tonka Island was introduced, an island in which most of the mechanical parts of the game are produced, such as the Airship (a mode of transportation as well as a mobile house) and the Gatling Cannon (a type of Pet). It is also the only place where it is possible to register and modify an Airship for transportation uses.

In SAGA 6 and 7, two new dungeons were introduced, Maimai Ruins and the Water Layer. Maimai Ruins can be reached via Tonka Island and paying a man 200 gold to take you to the island on which the ruins are located. The Water Layer is located in the Titanian World and, for a period of time until SAGA 9, will be the only area in that world that is opened to players. Waterlayer can only be accessed via the Sky Tower linking the Emil World to the Titanian World (above) and the Dominion World (below), and players have to undergo a series of quests to retrieve a Sky Tower Key to gain entry to the Tower and defeat the Titania Dragon boss monster. These SAGAs also mark the appearances of Catty Sora and the twin Cattys Kurumi and Wakana, the implementation of the lvl 90 weapons and the Breeder Joint Job.

In SAGA 8, players are now allowed access to the Dominion World and are invited to help the Dominion race by fighting off the DEM that are currently invading their world. This comes in the form of quests as well as a weekly server event known as the City War, in which players are summoned to defend the fortified city of Westfort. In helping the Dominion world, the players are given Contribution Points, or CP, to use as an alternate currency for certain items in the Dominion world. Also, the Gardener Joint Job is introduced with this SAGA.

In SAGA 9, Primula, a guide fairy for beginners, and ECO town were introduced. Primula helps players who are rather new to the game and don't have much experience in people and places to complete quests. ECO town is a Titanian resort which uses e-coins as currency. E-coins are bought at 100 gold each, meaning 100 e-coins cost 10000 gold. The resort includes a casino where players can try their hands at gambling games, like Daifugo, a Japanese game in which the players play cards against each other for more e-coins. Like CP, e-coins can be used to exchange for gifts in ECO Town. Some items, like motorcycles and mini-maid costumes can be bought here in addition to those already available in the Dominion world for players who can't battle well. This SAGA also sees the inclusion of the lvl 99 weapons and armors and a new tutorial.

SAGA 10 introduces the fourth playable race, the machine race Deus Ex Machina (generally known as DEM), which has many differences in gameplay compared to the existing three races. Character slots per account are also expanded from three to four, with one slot specially reserved only for a DEM character. Other changes include the implementation of dimensional dungeons (high level versions of certain existing dungeons, accessible only with the Dimensional Stone item) as well as the level 110 weapons.

=== Races ===
There are four player races in Emil Chronicle Online: Emil, Titania, Dominion and DEM. The first three races were available since the game was first launched. The DEM was originally a monster race but is available to players after SAGA 10.

In the main storyline quests and holiday events, the four races are each represented by a pair of NPCs: Emil and Marcia for the Emils, Titus and Tita for the Titania, Belial and R'lyeh for the Dominion, and LILI (formerly known as the Mysterious Girl) and LUX (formerly known as the Mysterious Youth) for the DEM.

=== Jobs ===
There are 13 jobs classes in Emil Chronicle Online, including the Novice which is what all non-DEM players start out with. From the Novice, players can choose to advance to one of the other 12 by speaking to the respective guild representative found in the Acropolis Guild Palace (or the Black/White Churches for Warlocks/Vates) and completing the quest assigned to them.

Jobs in ECO is separated into 3 main groups (Fighter, Spell User, Back Packer). Fighters are classes that focus on dealing physical damage and consist of the Swordsman, Fencer, Scout and Archer. Spell Users, as the name suggests, are the magi of the game and this group is made up of the Wizard, Shaman, Vates and Warlock. Backpackers are skilled in procuring materials as well as manufacturing and, for the Merchant, trade, made up of the Miner/Tatarabe, Farmer, Ranger and Merchant. In addition, there are two Joint Jobs, the Breeder and Garderner, that are accessible to all players after completing the relevant quests.

Each job, excluding the Novice and the Joint Jobs, currently has 3 tiers, and the maximum number of job levels is 50 for all jobs (including the Novice) and 30 for Joint Jobs . All players start from their 1st jobs after departing from the Novice class. After reaching level 30 of their 1st jobs, they have the choice of advancing to the 2nd job, which is divided into 2 groups, Expert and Technical, also known as 2-1 job and 2-2 job respectively. While all players will first advance to their Expert jobs after completing the 2nd job advancement quest, they have a choice to switch to their Technical jobs via an ingame item, and vice versa. They are allowed to take up to five 2nd job skills when switching to the other 2nd job (e.g. five Expert skills when switching to Technical), one skill for every ten job levels in the current job, and will suffer a level-drop penalty in the target class after the switch is done. The Chronicle jobs, generally known as the 3rd jobs, were implemented in Japan with effect from 19 August 2010 (SAGA 11) and include the Joker, the 2nd job for the Novice.

=== Marionette System ===
The "Marionette System" allows a player to morph their character to a Marionette. When in their Marionette form, players experience boosts and decreases to their stats, depending on which Marionette they are using and will gain access to the special skills available to that Marionette. Marionettes, like all other items, have a set durability which may be reduced should the player dies with possessing the Marionette.

=== Possession System ===
The Possession System allows players to "possess" an equipment of either their own or that belonging to another player. One can possess the upper armor, the chest accessory, left or right hand equipment.

When in possession state, the possessing player will receive experience equivalent to a percentage of the experience the possessed player receive from monster kills. Also, the possessing player will not be able to interact with NPCs and certain skills may be unusable. The possessing player will experience a recovery rate similar to that of towns, but on the other hand, skills used by the possessing player will cost twice their usual casting cost. The possessed player will not be able to turn into any Marionette so as long s/he dons a possessed equipment.

=== Pets ===
Pets are available to all players through quests, monster drops and from the ingame pet shop. There are three main categories of pets: Normal, Rideable and Piggyback pets. A fourth type, the Weapon Spirits, was included with SAGA 11. Most pets have their own set of skills that could be used to the master's benefit. All pets must be equipped before they can fight (or flee) along their masters.

Normal pets are as their name suggests, ordinary pets that tag along with their owners. All players will gain access to a "Go!" skill which allows them to order their pets to attack a specified target. Some classes, namely the Archer and all Backpacker classes, have the option to evolve certain Normal pets to a more powerful version, as well as access to special skills that can be used along with such pets.

Rideable pets are steeds that carry their masters around the land of Acronia and beyond. When riding a Rideable pet, the player's HP and most other stats are replaced by their pet's and the pet attacks on its master's place. Some Rideable pets can carry not only its own master but also other players possessing its owner.

Piggyback monsters, also known in the English and Indonesian versions as "Cattys", are cat-like spirits that are modelled after the nekomata. In addition to supporting their masters with skills, the Cattys also increase the owner's item capacity when equipped.

From SAGA 11 onwards, players can choose to convert their level 110 weapons, with the help of a cash shop item, into a special pet known as the Weapon Spirit. There are twelve Weapon Spirits which, like the Catties, come with their personal names and sets of skills.

=== Production I.G Theater ===
Within the game itself is a virtual theater operated by a well-known anime production company of the same name. The area, which looks like a movie theater, will show promotional clips of exclusive content and staff interviews. In addition, players can purchase Production I.G merchandise and other in-game items. However, this feature is available only in the Japanese version.

== Fees ==
With the Iris Update on May 28, 2009, Emil Chronicle Online Japan removed the monthly fee and enhanced the Cash Shop. All other localized versions of the game are also free to play with a Cash Shop.

== Development and release ==
Emil Chronicle Online was developed by GungHo Online Entertainment. It was co-produced by Headlock and Broccoli. The international version was published by Gravity. On 15 May 2017, Gungho announced that Emil Chronicle would close down on 31 August, 12 years after the release. To commemorate the service's end, Gungho released the "Ending Update" that concluded story arcs and added several events.
