= Runewaker Entertainment =

Taiwanese video game company

Runewaker Entertainment 思維工坊股份有限公司
- Industry: Video games
- Founded: Taichung, Taiwan (August 13, 2004)
- Headquarters: Taichung, Taiwan
- Area served: Worldwide
- Products: Runes of Magic, Dragon's Prophet, Castellan
- Divisions: (Asia, Asia Pacific, Europe, North America)
- Website: www.runewaker.com?lang=en

Runewaker Entertainment (Chinese: 思維工坊股份有限公司) is a Taiwanese video game company. It was established on August 13, 2004 in Taichung, Taiwan. The company has developed a MMORPG game, Runes of Magic.

== Runes of Magic ==
Runes of Magic was the first game developed by Runewaker Entertainment. The game is licensed in over 16 languages. Runes of Magic has also won various awards around the world.

== Dragon's Prophet ==
On March 23, 2012, Runewaker Entertainment announced its new MMORPG game, Dragon's Prophet. Runewaker would also collaborate with the Japanese game publisher, Aeria Games, to release Dragon's Prophet in Japan. The game revolves around a fantasy world where human warriors fight alongside dragons to achieve victory over insurmountable odds.

On October 19, 2012, Sony Online Entertainment(SOE) announced new licensing and publishing partnership with Runewaker Entertainment for the Dragon's Prophet in North America.

== Castellan ==
Runewaker's first web game, Castellan, is available on Facebook. The game focuses on the expansion of territories and role playing. The player plays as the Lord of the Kingdom who is tasked with the mission of finding a true homeland for his people. Furthermore, the player must manage his resources and military in order to reclaim the land from the force of evil. In the near future, the players will co-operate with each other to achieve their goals.

== See also ==
- List of companies of Taiwan
