= Jennifer Stigile =

American actress and singer

- Born: October 31, 1977 (age 48)
- Occupations: Actress, singer, voice actress

Jennifer Stigile (born October 31, 1977) is an American actress and singer who is mostly known for voiceovers in Japanese video games published by Working Designs during the 1990s and early 2000s and for XSEED in 2010. She also performed the vocals for many of these games, including "Wind's Nocturne (Luna's Boat Song)" from Lunar: Silver Star Story Complete. Stigile also has performed in multiple radio jingles and commercials.

A Christian, Stigile has also performed for local religious functions hosted by the Horizon Christian Fellowship in the Rancho Santa Fe area. Additionally, she has performed "The Star-Spangled Banner" at Petco Park on many occasions as part of the Horizon Praise Band, and later, the Horizon Worship Team. Stigile is also featured on CDs with Mike Clark Band and After Eden, singing "Beauty in the Still" and "Your Beautiful Life", among other song.

From 2017 through 2018, Stigile collaborated with Cali Tucker from Season 6 of The Voice (also the niece of Tanya Tucker) and performed with Tucker throughout Las Vegas.

== Filmography ==
=== Video games ===
- Lunar: Eternal Blue - Ruby, Jean
- Albert Odyssey: Legend of Eldean - Cirrus
- Magic Knight Rayearth - Umi Ryuzaki
- Lunar: Silver Star Story Complete - Royce
- Silhouette Mirage - Dynamis
- Lunar 2: Eternal Blue Complete - Ruby, Jean
- Growlanser III: The Dual Darkness - Annette Burns

== Music ==
- Popful Mail - Ending Song
- Lunar: Eternal Blue - "Eternal Blue" and "Lucia's Theme"
- Magic Knight Rayearth - "Daring Dreams"
- Lunar: Silver Star Story Complete - "Wings" and "Wind's Nocturne"
- Silhouette Mirage - "Leave the Tears Behind"
- Vanguard Bandits - "Believe My Heart"
- Lunar 2: Eternal Blue Complete - "Eternal Blue [Rondo—Light and Shadows]" and "Lucia's Theme"
- Arc the Lad Collection - "Way of the Earth"
- Lunar: Silver Star Harmony - "Wings 2009" and "Nocturne of the Wind 2009"
- Growlanser III: The Dual Darkness - Opening Song "To Your Tomorrow"

== See also ==
- Sony Wonder
- Sony Music Entertainment (Japan) Inc.
- Working Designs
