= Gaijinworks =

American video game publishing company

- Company type: Public
- Industry: Video games
- Founded: July 2006
- Defunct: 2018
- Headquarters: Redding, California
- Key people: Victor Ireland (founder)
- Website: http://www.gaijinworks.com

Gaijinworks is an American video game publishing company founded by Victor Ireland in July 2006. The company was established shortly after the dissolution of Working Designs in December 2005 of which Ireland was president. Containing the Japanese word gaijin, or "foreigner", Gaijinworks would carry on the former company's legacy of localizing "niche" Japanese games for American audiences while working closely with the original developers. Although the company was initially inactive for the first three years of its existence, the first localization project was announced in March 2009 as Hudson Soft's Miami Law for the Nintendo DS. However, there has not been a new release since 2017.

== Company history ==
In December 2005, Victor Ireland, president of video game publisher Working Designs announced via the company's website that they would be closing their doors due to internal conflicts with Sony Computer Entertainment and an inability to secure the approval rights to release games on Sony's PlayStation 2 console such as Bōken Jidai Katsugeki Goemon. The announcement was made one year since the company released their last game in North America, Growlanser Generations, in December 2004, which Ireland claimed "wounded [us]" after the company was forced by Sony to package two previously separate projects together, which doubled production costs and halved profit for the title. Ireland stated that he was not ready to leave the game industry, however, and began negotiations with Microsoft to work with the other former members of his staff to localize role-playing video games for their Xbox 360 console.

Seven months later in July 2006, Ireland announced that he had begun a new company called "Gaijinworks", that would carry on the legacy of Working Designs and would once again have himself as head translator. Although he had announced that "game related news" would follow the following summer, with the official website going live the following late summer or fall, information on the company's activities remained elusive along with a three-year period of inactivity. The silence was broken in January 2009, when Ireland told 1UP.com that "game related news" would be coming from the company in the following months, though it would not be one of the "main" games they were known for. In March 2009, Gaijinworks had announced their first localization project since the company began, Hudson Soft's crime-based adventure game Miami Law for the Nintendo DS. Ireland worked closely with Hudson's design team on the project, including taking them on a tour of an American city to aid in development. Gaijinworks has since partnered with Sunsoft to release Blaster Master on the North American Virtual Console service as well as the WiiWare remake Blaster Master: Overdrive. After this short partnership Gaijinworks has partnered with MonkeyPaw Games to release Vanguard Bandits on the PlayStation Store as part of the PSone Classics line. Gaijinworks also digitally released other PS1 classics that were also originally published by Working Designs such as Arc the Lad Collection and Alundra. Victor Ireland has also mentioned on various occasions that he is working towards adding both Lunar: Silver Star Story Complete and Lunar 2: Eternal Blue Complete to the PlayStation Network.

== Works published ==
Title	Date	Developer	Platform(s)	Region(s)
Miami Law	June 9, 2009	Hudson Soft	Nintendo DS	NA
Blaster Master	December 14, 2009	Sunsoft	Virtual Console	NA, EU
Blaster Master: Overdrive	February 8, 2010	Sunsoft	WiiWare	NA, EU
Arc the Lad	October 12, 2010 [NA] January 18, 2012 [EU]	SCEI, G-Craft	PlayStation Network	NA, EU
Alundra	October 12, 2010 [NA] August 15, 2012 [EU]	Matrix Software	PlayStation Network	NA, EU
Arc the Lad II	November 23, 2010 [NA] March 28, 2012 [EU]	SCEI, Arc Entertainment	PlayStation Network	NA, EU
Arc the Lad III	January 4, 2011 [NA] June 13, 2012 [EU]	SCEI, Arc Entertainment	PlayStation Network	NA, EU
Vanguard Bandits	November 15, 2011	Human Entertainment	PlayStation Network	NA, EU
Class of Heroes 2	June 4, 2013	Acquire	PlayStation Portable	NA
Class of Heroes 2G	June 2, 2015	Acquire	PlayStation 3	NA
Summon Night 5	December 15, 2015	Felistella	PlayStation Portable	NA
Summon Night 6: Lost Borders	October 31, 2017 [NA] November 15, 2017 [EU]	Media.Vision	PlayStation 4, PlayStation Vita	NA, EU
