= Miami Law =

2009 video game

- Developer: Hudson Soft
- Publishers: NA: Gaijinworks; JP: Hudson Soft; EU: Konami
- Designer: Makoto Kawaguchi
- Programmer: Yusume Takumi
- Artist: Susumu Kuribayashi
- Composer: Hironobu Yahata
- Platform: Nintendo DS
- Release: NA: June 9, 2009; JP: August 6, 2009; EU: September 25, 2009
- Genre: Adventure game
- Mode: Single-player

Miami Law, known in Japan and Europe as Miami Crisis (マイアミクライシス, Maiami Kuraishisu), is an adventure video game developed by Hudson Soft for the Nintendo DS handheld system. Though produced by a Japanese company, the title was initially released in North America on June 9, 2009 and it was released in Europe on September 25, with the English localization being the first project by Gaijinworks since its establishment in 2006. Hudson Soft worked closely with Gaijinworks founder and head translator Victor Ireland on the project, who sent a research team to Miami, Florida to aid in development of the title. The game features music by hip hop group Miami Beat Wave, who were licensed by Ireland to give the game's location an authentic feel.

Inspired by prime-time crime drama television series, Miami Law follows the exploits of Miami Police Department Officer Law Martin and FBI agent Sara Starling as they attempt to bring down a domestic terrorist organization. Gameplay for the title varies depending on which character a player chooses, with largely action sequences for Martin and puzzle-based scenarios for Starling.

== Gameplay ==
Sara and Law track down a suspect's car on the freeway.

Miami Law is a point-and-click adventure game where players must gather clues, read text, and become involved in the story in order to solve mysteries and move the plot forward. The game uses a mixture of three-dimensional computer graphics for action sequences and two-dimensional character images for story scenes. Players are given the choice of assuming the role of either Law Martin, whose scenarios largely involve action scenes such as car chases and shoot-outs, or Sara Starling, who primarily uses puzzle-based gameplay such as analyzing clues and compiling evidence. A player is given the opportunity to switch between characters at certain points in the game's story, with the plot being affected by which character is used at different points in the narrative. In addition to normal gameplay elements, Miami Law also includes minigames such as Sudoku and Texas hold 'em that can be accessed after the player has fulfilled certain requirements during the main game.

== Development ==
Miami Law was first announced in a February 2009 press release by Nintendo of America outlining several games that were to be released for Nintendo consoles such as the Nintendo DS. The game was developed by Hudson Soft and was largely based on American crime dramas, and would contain "all of the ingredients of a prime-time TV show". Despite being developed by a Japanese company, Victor Ireland, founder of Gaijinworks, announced the following March that the title's first release would be in North America and that his company would be publishing it as their first project. During development, Hudson Soft sent a research team to Miami, Florida, where they were taken on a tour of the city by Ireland himself in order to give the developers a better idea of the game's setting. Ireland would also serve as the game's head writer, which he likened to his involvement as former head translator for his first company Working Designs, stating that "the philosophy is very similar, but the tone of the game demanded a much harder edge." While his work at Working Designs was noted for its light-hearted and comical approach, Ireland remarked that Miami Law would require a more serious approach to storytelling, remarking that "there's definitely comedy and some fun wordplay, but it's a police drama so the localization reflects that... the tone of the game would be similar to something like what we did for Arc the Lad." For the game's music, Ireland enlisted the help of Miami-based hip hop duo Miami Beat Wave in order to give the game's setting a more authentic feel, who composed fifteen original songs for the title.

In April 2009, a European release of the game was officially announced by Hudson Soft to be published by Konami under the title Miami Crisis, and released on September 25.

== Reception ==
Reception

Aggregate score
| Aggregator | Score |
|---|---|
| Metacritic | 56/100 |

Review scores
| Publication | Score |
|---|---|
| Adventure Gamers | 2/5 |
| Famitsu | 29/40 |
| GamePro | 2.5/5 |
| GamesMaster | 50% |
| GameSpot | 5/10 |
| GamesRadar+ | 3/5 |
| GameZone | 5.5/10 |
| Nintendo Power | 3/10 |
| Official Nintendo Magazine | 67% |
| RPGFan | 66% |

The game received "mixed" reviews according to video game review aggregator Metacritic. In Japan, Famitsu gave it a score of two eights, one six, and one seven, for a total of 29 out of 40.
