= Albert Odyssey: Legend of Eldean =

1996 video game

- North American cover art
- Developer: Sunsoft
- Publishers: JP: Sunsoft; NA: Working Designs
- Producer: Kiharu Yoshida
- Designer: Yoshiaki Iwata
- Programmers: Akihiro Asada; Hiroaki Atsumi; Hiroya Matsugami
- Artists: Akari Funato; Toshiyuki Kubooka
- Writer: Tsuyoshi Matsumoto
- Composer: Naoki Kodaka
- Series: Albert Odyssey
- Platform: Sega Saturn
- Release: JP: 9 August 1996; NA: 23 July 1997
- Genre: Role-playing
- Mode: Single-player

Albert Odyssey: Legend of Eldean (Note: Known as Albert Odyssey Gaiden ~Legend of Eldean~ (Japanese: アルバートオデッセイ外伝 ～レジェンド オブ エルディーン～, Hepburn: Arubāto Odessei Gaiden ~ Rejendo Obu Erudīn ~) in Japan.) is a role-playing video game produced by Sunsoft for the Sega Saturn. It was originally made for the Super NES, and ported to the Saturn late in its development. Released in Japan in August 1996, the game was made available in North America in July 1997 by Working Designs.

Legend of Eldean is the first Albert Odyssey title to be released in English, as well as the first to feature traditional turn-based role-playing elements as opposed to tactical, strategy-based gameplay. It was created as a "gaiden", or sidestory to the original titles, and contains back story, characters, and plot that are independent from earlier games in the series. The North American version received mixed reviews.

== Gameplay ==
Albert Odyssey: Legend of Eldean is a traditional RPG, with an overhead perspective and combat based around the selecting of character actions from menus.

== Story ==
The game follows the adventure of Pike, a teenage boy whose family was murdered by a horde of monsters while still an infant, and is raised by a family of winged humanoids known as Harpies. Twenty years later, his adoptive sister is turned to stone by an evil mage. Together with Cirrus, a talking sword housing the spirit of one of the legendary Eldean siblings, Pike travels the world to search for a cure, and discovers a plot by a group of evil magicians to turn the world's races against each other and revive the ancient god Vlag. Together with the help of friends he meets along his journey, Pike must prevent the evil's resurrection.

== Characters ==
- Pike – A human raised by Harpies after his parents' town was slaughtered. He has inherited his father's enchanted sword, Cirrus.
- Eka – A singer Pike encounters in the town of Gigarl and becomes enamored with. Though emotionally withdrawn due to losing her parents at a young age, Eka finds herself opening up to the courageous and sensitive Pike. She wields numerous throwing weapons and powerful spells.
- Leos – Daughter of the great priest Koras, a monk with an expert command of martial arts and healing abilities, dedicated to the priesthood. She joins Pike for his first adventure.
- Gryzz – A dragonman, the oldest of the party, and the most powerful physical attacker. He holds a steadfast affection for his sister, and wields two katana in battle. In addition, he has a variety of breath weapons. Called Eruda in the Japanese version.
- Amon – A rather flamboyant birdman who is very vain, a trait that leads to his fellow kinsmen loathing his presence. He eventually swallows his pride and brings his halberd skills to the party.
- Kia – An apprentice magician who takes Leos' place in the party for their second adventure. She is the granddaughter of a famous sorceress. Powerful attack spells are at her command, although her air-headed nature can lead her into trouble.

== Development ==
The characters were all designed by Toshiyuki Kubooka. Albert Odyssey: Legend of Eldean was originally developed for the Super NES. When plans for the SNES version release fell through, the game was ported to the Saturn; the chief alteration between the platforms being the addition of an orchestrated soundtrack.

The game was also released in South Korea in 1997 as a Korean-language edition titled Albert Odyssey Gaiden (알버트 오딧세이 외전), published by Wooyoung System. The release was among several Sega Saturn games localised by the company, which also published Korean editions of Myst and El-Hazard. The Korean edition carries the catalogue number T-26804H-08.

== Audio ==
The music of Legend of Eldean was composed by in-house Sunsoft composer Naoki Kodaka, who wrote the score for the two previous Albert Odyssey titles. Background music consists of a combination of built-in synth from the Sega Saturn's internal sound chip and live instrumentation recorded at Japan's Music Farm Studio. Selected tracks were presented using CD-quality pulse-code modulation as opposed to sequenced, MIDI-based audio, resulting in fuller, more realistic sound. Unlike most Japanese RPGs of the time, Albert Odyssey: Legend of Eldean makes little use of voice acting or cinematics, presenting most of its story through text.

On March 21, 1996, Sunsoft released an official soundtrack to the game in Japan published by Pony Canyon Records. The album consists of two discs, with the first fourteen tracks on disc one consisting of the live-recorded songs used in the game. Disc two contains a bonus sound effect digest featuring sound and voice clips used in the Japanese version, as well as two arranged tracks including the normal battle theme and end title.

== Reception ==
Reception

Aggregate score
Aggregator	Score
GameRankings	75% (6 reviews)

Review scores
Publication	Score
Electronic Gaming Monthly	33 / 40
Game Informer	7.25 / 10
GameSpot	7.6 / 10
IGN	7 / 10
Next Generation	2/5
Game Players	7 / 10
RPGFan	91%

Award
Publication	Award
Electronic Gaming Monthly	Editor's Choice Silver Award

The game was re-released in Japan on 20 June 1997 as part of the Saturn Collection budget series, priced at ¥2,800.

Dan Hsu of Electronic Gaming Monthly remarked that the game was "not only beautiful (both musically and graphically), it has one of the best, most involving story lines seen in an RPG", calling the game's dialogue "witty" and awarding it an Editor's Choice Silver Award. GameSpot stated that "Although there are better RPGs out there, Albert Odyssey delivers where it counts", commending Working Designs for their script as well as several gameplay improvements made to the North American release, but found much of the game's design to be "unimaginative". Game Players called the game a "worthwhile venture" and found that the town and dungeon graphics' "subtle detailing and rich colors are beautiful things", but declared that the overworld graphics and spell effects were lacking, calling them "disappointingly bland, lacking any visual depth". GameFan conversely declared that the in-battle graphics were "very nice", yet found fault in the game's slow pacing and dated presentation, especially when compared to newer, more cinematic role-playing games.

GamePro stated that "Although Albert Odyssey materializes on the Saturn with a fun cast of characters, a soothing soundtrack, and a compelling story line, the lack of solid gameplay and overall shortness of the adventure banish this RPG to the realm of rentals." They compared it unfavorably to Shining the Holy Ark, which was released in the U.S. the same month as Albert Odyssey. Game Informer criticized the slow pace of the gameplay, the monotonous battles, and the lack of any standout aspect, but concluded that "Even if you don't even like RPG's[sic] Albert Odyssey warrants a rental at the very least. The laughs you'll get out of it are worth more than a couple of bucks." Next Generation stated that "The magic spells and combat engine are not just slow and unimpressive, but downright painful to look at. ... Luckily, Working Designs polished up the storyline and text to make the game seem more valuable and made a valiant effort to make the most of a regrettably forgettable game." However, he recommended that Saturn-owning Working Designs fans instead hold out for their upcoming release of Lunar: Silver Star Story Complete. IGN also compared the game to future Working Designs titles, calling it "more of a mild appetizer for Lunar and Magic Knight Rayearth – it'll hold you over, but it's not a satisfying meal in itself", nonetheless calling the game "pretty good". German magazine MAN!AC reviewed the North American import version, awarding it 70% and offering a mixed assessment of its traditional role-playing gameplay.

== See also ==
- Albert Odyssey (1993 video game)
