= Kiyoyuki Yanada =

Japanese voice actor (1965–2022)

- 梁田 清之
- Born: Kiyoyuki Harita; May 10, 1965; Nerima, Tokyo, Japan
- Died: November 14, 2022 (aged 57)
- Occupation: Voice actor
- Years active: 1987–2022
- Notable work: Slam Dunk as Takenori Akagi; JoJo's Bizarre Adventure: Heritage for the Future as Jotaro Kujo; Case Closed as Andre Camel; Dragon Ball GT as General Rildo; Castlevania as Richter Belmont

Kiyoyuki Yanada (梁田 清之, Yanada Kiyoyuki; May 10, 1965 – November 14, 2022) was a Japanese freelance voice actor who was formerly affiliated with Kyu Production, 81 Produce, and D-COLOR. As a child, he wanted to be a physical education teacher before becoming a voice actor in 1987. The first role he auditioned for was Shutendouji in Ronin Warriors. He took over some of the roles from the late Yō Yoshimura and Kazuyuki Sogabe. His hobbies included driving and sports such as baseball, soccer, and karate.

On November 21, 2022, it was announced that Yanada died whilst undergoing cancer treatment on November 14 at the age of 57.

== Notable voice roles ==
=== Television animation ===
1980s

- Jushin Liger (1989) – Ryu Dolk

1990s

- Kyatto Ninden Teyandee (1990) – Rikinoshin
- The Brave Fighter of Legend Da-Garn (1992) – Turbo Lander, Violeece
- Slam Dunk (1993–96) – Takenori Akagi
- Shippū! Iron Leaguer (1993) - Gold Arm
- Captain Tsubasa J (1994) – Hiroshi Jito
- Macross 7 (1994) – Barton
- Magic Knight Rayearth (1994) – Geo Metro
- Bonobono (1995) – Higuma no Taishō
- Sorcerer Hunters (1995) – Gateau
- Virtua Fighter (1995–96) – Kage-Maru
- Dragonball GT (1996) – General Rildo
- Yat Anshin Uchuu Ryokou (1996) – Kaoru Yamamoto
- Pocket Monsters (1997) – Kaz Gym Leader, James' father
- Bubblegum Crisis Tokyo 2040 (1998) – Leon McNichol
- Fancy Lala (1998) – Narumi
- Digimon Adventure (1999) – Andromon

2000s

- Digimon Adventure 02 (2000) – Andromon
- Inuyasha (2001) – Rōyankan
- Digimon Tamers (2002) – Guardromon/Andromon
- Digimon Frontier (2002) – Asuramon
- Cromartie High School (2003) – Jackson Setouchi
- Astro Boy (2003) – Harley
- Transformers: Armada (2003) – Megatron
- Rockman.EXE Axess (2003) – Desertman
- Zatch Bell! (2003) – Baltro
- Bleach (2004) – Tessai Tsukabishi, Baigon
- Rockman.EXE Stream (2004) – Desertman, Takeo Inukai
- SD Gundam Force (2004) – Cobramaru
- Oh My Goddess! (2005) – Toraichi Tamiya
- Black Lagoon (2006) – Ginji Matsuzaki
- Code Geass (2006) – Andreas Darlton
- Fist of the Blue Sky (2006) – Máng Kuáng-Yún
- D.Gray-man (2007) – Noise Marie
- Death Note (2007) – Takeshi Ooi
- Tengen Toppa Gurren Lagann (2007) – Thymilph
- Detective Conan (2008) – Andre Camel
- Shin Mazinger Shougeki! Z Hen (2009) – Archduke Gorgon
- Inuyasha: The Final Act (2009) – Bone demon's father

2010s

- Digimon Xros Wars (2010) – AncientVolcamon
- The Ambition of Oda Nobuna (2012) – Yoshitatsu Saitō
- Hunter × Hunter (2011) - Todo, Tsezguerra
- Berserk (2017) – Grunbeld

2020s

- Getter Robo Arc (2021) – Benkei Kuruma
- Boruto: Naruto Next Generations (2022) – Captain Taiki

=== Theatrical animation ===
- The Heroic Legend of Arslan (1991) – Zande
- Mobile Suit Gundam F91 (1991) – Zabine Chareux
- Slam Dunk (1994) – Takenori Akagi
- Slam Dunk: Conquer the Nation, Hanamichi Sakuragi! (1994) – Takenori Akagi
- Slam Dunk: Shohoku's Greatest Challenge! (1995) – Takenori Akagi
- Slam Dunk: Howling Basketman Spirit!! (1995) – Takenori Akagi
- Perfect Blue (1998) – Director

=== OVAs ===
- Otaku no Video (1991) – Murata
- Domain of Murder (1992) - Detective Shimizu
- Oh My Goddess! (1993) - Toraichi Tamiya
- Moldiver (1993) – Kaoru Misaki
- After School in the Teacher's Lounge (1994) – Kazama Toshiaki
- Fire Emblem (1995) – Gazak
- Mutant Turtles: Choujin Densetsu-hen (1996) – Shredder
- The King of Braves GaoGaiGar Final (2000) – Palparepa
- New Getter Robo (2004) – Benkei Musashibô

=== Video games ===
- Castlevania: Rondo of Blood (1993) – Shaft
- Virtua Fighter 3 (1996) – Taka-Arashi
- Lunar: Silver Star Story Complete (1996) – Ghaleon
- Castlevania: Symphony of the Night (1997) – Richter Belmont, Shaft
- JoJo's Bizarre Adventure (1998) – Jotaro Kujo
- Inuyasha (2001) – Rōyakan
- Z.O.E ~Zone of the Enders~ (2001) – Rock Thunderheart
- Baten Kaitos: Eternal Wings and the Lost Ocean (2003) – Gibari
- Rockman ZX (2006) – Serpent
- Virtua Fighter 5 R/Final Showdown/Ultimate Showdown (2007, 2010, 2021) – Taka-Arashi
- Lunar: Silver Star Harmony (2009) – Ghaleon
- Marvel vs. Capcom 3: Fate of Two Worlds / Ultimate Marvel vs. Capcom 3 (2011) – Mike Haggar
- Guilty Gear series (Xrd [2014, 2016], Strive [2021]) - Colin Vernon E. Groubitz
- Berserk and the Band of the Hawk (2016) – Grunbeld
- Street Fighter V (2016) – Mike Haggar
- Super Smash Bros. Ultimate (2018) - Richter Belmont, Mii Fighters
- Bleach: Rebirth of Souls (2025) - Baraggan Louisenbairn

=== Tokusatsu ===
- Ninja Sentai Kakuranger (1994) – Amanojaku (ep. 33)
- Chouriki Sentai Ohranger Movie (1995) – Locker Knight
- Hyakujuu Sentai Gaoranger (2001) – Samurai Doll Org (ep. 11)
- Kamen Rider Agito (2001) – El of the Water (ep. 33 - 34, 41 - 43)
- Ninpu Sentai Hurricanger (2002) – Boss Tau Zanto (ep. 1 - 50)
- Ninpu Sentai Hurricanger: Shushuuto the Movie (2002) - Boss Tau Zanto
- Ninpu Sentai Hurricanger vs. Gaoranger (2003) - Boss Tau Zanto
- Abaranger vs. Hurricanger (2004) – Janin Iiga
- Kamen Rider Blade (2004) – Kamen Rider Leangle/Rebirth Spider Undead (ep. 17-42)
- Mahou Sentai Magiranger (2005) – Hades Beastman Beldan The Behemoth (ep. 24)
- Gougou Sentai Boukenger (2006) – Wicked Dragon Narga (ep. 15 - 16)
- Kamen Rider Den-O (2007) – Bat Imagin (ep. 1 - 2)
- Engine Sentai Go-onger (2008) – Land Pollution Minister Yogostein (eps 1 - 36) (voice), Crime Minister Yogoshimacritein (eps. 46 - 51) (voice), Joudo Toudori (ep. 51) (actor)
- Engine Sentai Go-onger: Boom Boom! Bang Bang! GekijōBang!! (2008) – Land Pollution Minister Yogostein, Ronin of Samurai Word
- Engine Sentai Go-onger vs. Gekiranger (2009) – Land Pollution Minister Yogostein
- Samurai Sentai Shinkenger vs. Go-onger: GinmakuBang!! (2010) – Land Pollution Minister Yogostein
- Gokaiger Goseiger Super Sentai 199 Hero Great Battle (2011) – Revival Crime Minister Yogoshimacritein
- Kaizoku Sentai Gokaiger vs. Space Sheriff Gavan: The Movie (2012) – Land Pollution Minister Yogostein
- Zyuden Sentai Kyoryuger (2013) – Debo Tairyoun (ep. 34)
- Shuriken Sentai Ninninger (2015) – Western Yokai Franken (ep. 24)
- Uchu Sentai Kyuranger (2017) – Big Bear (ep. 9 - 10, 25)
- Engine Sentai Go-Onger: 10 Years Grand Prix (2018) - Land Pollution Minister Yogostein

=== Drama CD ===
- Abunai series 4: Abunai Campus Love – Ryuu Okikura
- Ao no Kiseki series 1: Ao no Kiseki – Lord
- Ao no Kiseki series 2: Catharsis Spell – Lord
- Ao no Kiseki series 3: Crystal Crown – Lord
- Ao no Kiseki series 4: Baroque Pearl – Lord
- Ao no Kiseki series 5: Persona Non Grata – Lord
- Ao no Kiseki series 6: Phantom Pain – Lord
- Boxer Wa Inu Ni Naru series 3: Raibaru mo Inu wo Daku – Sakamoto
- Ishiguro Kazuomi shi no, Sasayaka na Tanoshimi – Raikou
- JoJo's Bizarre Adventure - Jotaro Kujo
- Koishikute – Watanabe
- Love Mode – Aoe Reiji
- Love & Trust – Ryouji Kutsuzawa
- Muteki na Anoko – Yasuda
- Rolex ni Kuchizukewo – Kunimitsu Yoshida
- Workday Warriors - Koi ni Ochite - – Takeshi Nadaka

=== Dubbing ===
==== Live-action ====
- Bad Company – Jarma (Adoni Maropis)
- Batman Begins (2007 NTV edition) – Judge Faden (Gerard Murphy)
- Billy Bathgate – Billy Bathgate (Loren Dean)
- Carlito's Way – Pachanga (Luis Guzmán)
- Jurassic Park – Ray Arnold (Samuel L. Jackson)
- Space Jam – Patrick Ewing
- Star Wars: Episode I – The Phantom Menace – Captain Panaka (Hugh Quarshie)
- Training Day – Moreno (Noel Gugliemi)
- X-Men – Logan / Wolverine (Hugh Jackman)

==== Animated ====
- Aaahh!!! Real Monsters – Elban Bigfoot
- Beast Wars – Depth Charge
- Bionicle: Mask of Light – Onua
- Calling All Engines! – Diesel 10
- Teenage Mutant Ninja Turtles – Shredder
- Teenage Mutant Ninja Turtles – '87 Shredder
