= Lunar Remastered Collection =

2025 video game compilation

- Developer: Ashibi Co.
- Publisher: GungHo Online Entertainment
- Artist: Toshiyuki Kubooka
- Composer: Noriyuki Iwadare
- Series: Lunar
- Platforms: Nintendo Switch; PlayStation 4; Windows; Xbox One
- Release: April 18, 2025
- Genre: Role-playing
- Mode: Single-player

Lunar Remastered Collection (Note: Japanese: LUNAR(ルナ) リマスターコレクション, Hepburn: Runa Rimasutā Korekushon) is a video game compilation developed by Ashibi Co. and published by GungHo Online Entertainment, containing remastered versions of the role-playing games Lunar: Silver Star Story Complete (1996) and Lunar 2: Eternal Blue Complete (1998), originally developed by Game Arts. It was released for Nintendo Switch, PlayStation 4, Windows, and Xbox One on April 18, 2025.

The collection features updates to the original games including enhanced graphics and audio, widescreen support, spoken language options in Japanese or English, and various quality-of-life improvements.

== Content ==
Lunar Remastered Collection features updated versions of Lunar: Silver Star Story Complete (1996) and its sequel, Lunar 2: Eternal Blue Complete (1998), originally released on the Sega Saturn and PlayStation. Both games in turn are remakes of the Sega CD titles Lunar: The Silver Star (1992) and Lunar: Eternal Blue (1994). Each are single-player role-playing video games where players advance the story by traveling across a fantasy world battling enemies in turn-based combat sequences. The remastered versions contain updated two-dimensional graphics and character sprites, along with widescreen display support. Players may choose between the "Remastered" and original "Classic" unmodified fullscreen graphics.

Both titles contain newly recorded English dubs, using the original scripts by Working Designs, along with the original Japanese voice track. French and German language options have also been added for text and subtitles. The collection contains arranged music, along with re-recorded English vocals by Jackie Lastra and Anne Yatco, respectively, as well as upscaled HD animated anime cutscenes. New additions to the games' combat include the ability to speed up battle animations and added options for strategy.

== Development ==
On March 11, 2024, Game Arts renewed their trademark for "Lunar" in Japan, which was made public the following week. Lunar Remastered Collection was announced at the Sony State of Play livestream event six months later in September 2024 for the PlayStation 4 with a release window of early 2025. In a press release after the presentation, it was confirmed that the title would also be coming to the Nintendo Switch, Xbox One, and Windows.

The collection was developed by Ashibi Co. and published by GungHo Online Entertainment, who had previously released remastered versions of Game Arts' Grandia and Grandia II role-playing games as part of Grandia HD Collection in 2019. The original composer Noriyuki Iwadare has created a new song for the remaster, titled "Looking up at Terra", which is meant to connect Lunar 1 and Lunar 2 in instrumentation and song structure.

On January 14, 2025, it was announced that the collection was set to be released digitally and physically on April 18, 2025. Physical editions will be distributed by GungHo America and Clear River Games in North America and Europe, respectively, and feature reversible covers with new art by original artist Toshiyuki Kubooka.

== Reception ==
Reception

Aggregate scores
Aggregator	Score
Metacritic	(NS) 80/100 (PC) 80/100 (PS4) 79/100
OpenCritic	79% recommend

Review scores
Publication	Score
Hardcore Gamer	4/5
Nintendo Life	7/10
Nintendo World Report	7.5/10
Push Square	7/10
RPGFan	90/100
Shacknews	8/10

Lunar Remastered Collection received "generally favorable" reviews from critics, according to review aggregator website Metacritic.
