= Jackie Powers =

American actress

Jackie Powers is an American voice-over artist. She is best known for her roles as Shyna Nera Shyna in Silhouette Mirage, and Nall in Lunar: Silver Star Story Complete.

== Voice-over career ==
Powers' first voice-acting role was in 1993, when she voiced Nall in Lunar: The Silver Star. In 1999, she reprised the role of Nall in the latest version of Lunar: Silver Star Story, called LUNAR: Silver Star Story Complete, and took on the additional role of the character Mia Ausa. Next, in 2000, she voiced the role of Shyna Nera Shyna in the English-language version of Silhouette Mirage. In 2004, she portrayed Karene Langley in Growslanser II: The Sense of Justice, and also voiced the character Monika Allenford in the English-language version of Growslanser III: The Dual Darkness. Her most recent role is that of the character Fair, from the video game Summon Night 6: Lost Borders.

== Filmography ==
=== Video games ===
Year	Title	Role	Notes
1993	Lunar: The Silver Star	Nall	
1999	Lunar: Silver Star Story Complete	Nall, Mia Ausa	
2000	Silhouette Mirage	Shyna Nera Shyna	
2004	Growlanser Generations	Karene Langley, Monika Allenford	In Growslanser II and III respectively
2017	Summon Night 6: Lost Borders	Fair	
