= RayStorm =

1996 video game

- Sales flyer
- Developer: Taito
- Publisher: Taito: JP: Taito MediaQuest (Saturn) CyberFront Corporation (Windows) NA: Working Designs (PlayStation) EU: Sony Computer Entertainment (PlayStation) Empire Interactive (Windows)
- Director: Tomohisa Yamashita
- Producer: Yukio Abe
- Composer: Tamayo Kawamoto
- Series: Ray
- Platforms: Arcade, Saturn, PlayStation, Windows, Xbox 360, PlayStation 3, iOS, Android, tvOS
- Release: JP: August 1996; EU: September 1996; AS: September 1996; NA: October 1996
- Genre: Scrolling shooter
- Modes: Single-player, multiplayer
- Arcade system: Taito FX-1B

RayStorm (Note: Japanese: レイストーム, Hepburn: Rei Sutōmu) is a 1996 vertically scrolling shooter arcade video game developed and published by Taito. It has been ported to several consoles, including the PlayStation, Sega Saturn, and Xbox 360. Players control a starship, the R-Gray, in its mission to destroy the Secilia Federation before it destroys Earth.

RayStorm is one of three "Ray" games, all featuring similar gameplay, released by Taito. RayForce was released before RayStorm, and the RayForce prequel RayCrisis was released after the others. RayStorm is most distinguished from its predecessor by its usage of polygon-based ships instead of sprites. The plot of RayStorm, which is minimally revealed in the game itself but further described by the game's instruction manual and "Extra Mode" in home releases, is not connected to the "Con-Human" storyline of the other two games. The PlayStation version was generally well received by American reviewers due to its graphical style and cutting edge visual effects, but criticized for the simplistic and dated gameplay. The Sega Saturn version, only released in Japan, was named Layer Section II to follow the naming convention of its predecessor on this platform.

== Gameplay ==
A one-player game in progress

RayStorm is a shoot 'em up. The player views their ship from a distanced perspective while gunning down enemies in the game's vertically scrolling stages. At the beginning of the game, the player must choose one of two ships; a third secret ship is available in ported versions.

The player uses a vulcan-like laser weapon as their primary offense, and a missile weapon which can lock onto multiple targets and gain a combo multiplier, accumulating into a point total. Additionally, each ship has two special maneuvers. The Special Attack is initiated when the player fills a bar to the maximum by engaging in multiple lock-ons. When full the player can unleash a massive screen wide attack with a brief period of invincibility afterwards. The second, the Hyper Laser Assault, executes a special attack unique to each ship, and is performed by setting all available lock-on attacks on a single target and firing.

Home versions contain two gameplay modes: the "Arcade Mode", which preserves the look and feel of the original arcade version, and the "Extra Mode", which has enhanced graphics, additional enemies, modified bosses, and tougher difficulty, as well as a different ending. Also in Extra Mode, when the player gets a "continue", the score accumulated from the first stage will be retained (i.e. score will not reset to zero). Completing either mode unlocks a "stage select" option to play individual stages in the completed mode (except for the final stage) for a high score, while succeeding in both modes unlocks a "13 Players" option.

The "13 Players" option requires the player to complete the game using a total of 13 ships from 5 groups: three R-Gray 1 ships using "manual" control, in which primary and lock-on weapons are controlled separately; three R-Gray 2 ships, with manual control; three R-Gray 1 ships using "auto" control, in which primary and lock-on weapons are controlled with the same button; three "auto" R-Gray 2 ships; and one R-Gray 0 "prototype" ship. Either mode can be played with this option; completing the game under Extra Mode with this option reveals an additional epilogue. A high-definition version of the game, titled RayStorm HD, includes all three R-Grays and the R-Gear, a fourth ship that fires homing missiles.

== Development ==
Staff involved in the development of RayStorm include producer and director Yukio Abe, director Tatsuo Nakamura, music composer Tamayo Kawamoto, and sound effect composer Munehiro Nakanishi, who all had the same roles developing RayForce. Kawamoto and Nakanishi composed as members of Taito "house band" Zuntata, who trace their first work under that name to June 1987. A soundtrack to the game, including both its original music and some arrangements, was released on October 11, 1996. RayStorm was programmed for the Taito FX-1 arcade system board.

The demonstration of the PlayStation version at the August 1996 Tokyo Game Show was reportedly on a massive screen that dwarfed all of Taito's other demos at the show.

== Release ==
The game was released for the PlayStation in Japan in January 1997, and in March videogames.com, then the video gaming website of GameSpot, reported that "several companies are interested in porting" it for a North American release; no specific companies were named. Publisher/localization team Working Designs previously attempted to license RayForce, but publisher Acclaim had acquired exclusive rights to publish Taito's games in the Western Hemisphere just a few days before. When Working Designs heard about RayStorm, they asked Taito if that game was available, licensed it immediately, and met with Taito to discuss converting the game for American release in April. Working Designs' version was both their first release for the PlayStation and the first game released under their "SPAZ" label dedicated to shooter games; the last under that label was the next "Ray" game, RayCrisis. Working Designs had reconsidered their decision to not publish games for the PlayStation in light of Sony's changing attitude towards RPGs. On the same month it was released, an "Interactive CD Sampler" containing a playable demo of the game was bundled with American PlayStation consoles.

RayStorm has been included on the compilations Taito Memories Volume 2, a.k.a. Taito Memories Gekan, Taito Legends 2 for the PlayStation 2, G-Darius+Raystorm Pack, and Simple 1500 Series Vol. 75: The Double Shooting for the PlayStation, which also includes RayCrisis.

After Square Enix acquired Taito in 2005, it made its PlayStation Network debut in Japan on June 25, 2008, to make the release their new subsidiary's RayStorm and five other previously published PlayStation titles as downloadable games for the PlayStation 3 and PlayStation Portable (PSP) systems. RayStorm HD was released as a downloadable game in Japan for the PlayStation 3 and Xbox 360 in 2010, with the latter version also released in North America and Europe.

== Reception ==
Reception

Aggregate score
Aggregator	Score
Metacritic	79/100 (PS1)

Review scores
Publication	Score
AllGame	4/5 (PS1)
Electronic Gaming Monthly	8.25/10
Famitsu	32/40 (PS1)
GameSpot	7.8/10 (PS1)
IGN	7.5/10 (PS1)
Next Generation	3/5
Dengeki PlayStation	85/100, 95/100, 85/100, 90/100

Game Machine reported that RayStorm was among Japan's most-popular arcade games of September 1996.

GameSpot's review of its Japanese release called it "easily the best shooter currently available on the PlayStation". The website's staff praised its "Intense lighting effects and marvelous explosions [that] fill the screen" and its two soundtracks by Zuntata, but said some of the music lacks "the urgency and intensity you'd expect from a fast-paced shooter." They added that "even with variable difficulty settings, the game is nowhere near as difficult as its predecessor [RayForce]. Additionally, the main weapon doesn't seem to be as much of a necessity as it was in the original." Reviewing the North American release, Dan Hsu of Electronic Gaming Monthly agreed that the game provides no impetus for using anything other than the lock-on attack, and is generally lacking in variety of weapons and power-ups. He summed up that "Playing RayStorm is like dating a gorgeous girl with zero brains. It sure looks good, and it's a lot of fun for a short while, but you'll soon realize that you'll be wanting more out of it." His co-reviewers Crispin Boyer and Sushi-X were more positive, as they focused solely on the graphics and music. Scarry Larry of GamePro, however, said the music "tries to impress but comes up short." Similarly to Hsu, he found the graphics cutting edge and attractive but the gameplay too dated to appeal to fans of modern shooters.

IGN criticized the game's similarities to Xevious 3D/G+ and called it "a little short", but said that it has "amazing graphics, excellent music, and solid gameplay". Next Generation also noted the similarity to Xevious 3D/G+ but said RayStorm distinguished itself by having "a heavy anime influence, mainly in the form of powerful Macross-like mech bosses that will be sure to set the fan boy contingent drooling." He supported the overwhelming consensus that the graphics are the highlight of the game, and concluded, "There's no escaping the debt this game owes to Xevious - and just about every other shooter since - but if the proof of a modern shooter is in its design, then RayStorm is well-proven indeed."

Electronic Gaming Monthly named it a runner-up for "Shooter of the Year", behind Star Fox 64.

== See also ==
- RayForce
- RayCrisis
