= RayForce =

1993 video game

- Japanese sales flyer
- Developer: Taito
- Publisher: Taito
- Directors: Yukio Abe; Tatsuo Nakamura
- Producer: Yukio Abe
- Designers: Tatsuo Nakamura; Yukio Abe; Tomohisa Yamashita
- Composer: Tamayo Kawamoto
- Series: Ray
- Platforms: Arcade, Saturn, Windows, iOS, Android
- Release: Arcade: JP: February 1994; NA: 1994; EU: 1994
- Genre: Scrolling shooter
- Modes: Single-player, multiplayer
- Arcade system: Taito F3 System

RayForce (Note: Japanese: レイフォース, Hepburn: ReiFōsu) is a vertically scrolling shooter by Taito for the Taito F3 arcade hardware and released in 1994. It was ported to the Sega Saturn in 1995, Microsoft Windows in 1997, then rereleased for iOS in 2012 and Android in 2017.

Due to trademark problems, when the home version was released in Japan it was renamed Layer Section. The Windows version was released outside Japan retaining this name, but when Acclaim published the Saturn version for the North American and European markets, it was renamed Galactic Attack. The game was also titled Gunlock in European arcades.

== Gameplay ==
Gameplay screenshot

The player is provided with a ship called the RVA-818 X-LAY, which is outfitted with two weapons: a primary weapon that fires straight lasers and increases in power when the player accumulates power-ups, and a secondary lock-on laser launcher, which can also be increased in power, that can target up to eight enemies at once by moving the targeting reticle. This weapon is used to attack enemies that appear on a lower plane than that of your craft, which are inaccessible to the player's primary weapon.

== Plot ==
In the distant future, human governments, across the planet Earth, construct a massive supercomputer, named "Con-Human". The purpose of this computer is to govern the planet's environmental systems, verifying proper nutrients and care is provided to ensure the culture of humans and animal alike.

However, disaster strikes when, after a cloned human's mind is linked with the system, Con-Human becomes sentient and insane. It begins to induce calamities across the planet, constructing corrupt clones of existing organisms, destroying its human masters and exterminating the nature it was intended to protect, apparently intending to replace everything with what Con-Human considers improved versions of themselves.

After prolonged war, Con-Human has succeeded in exterminating 99.8% of humankind, with the remnants fleeing to space colonies. Meanwhile, Con-Human remakes the very interior of Earth. As a result, Earth, as humanity knew it, has utterly ceased to exist, transformed into a planet-sized mobile fortress that is in fact Con-Human's body. Con-Human intends to use the transformed Earth to seek out and destroy the colonies, erasing all remaining traces of old life from the universe and leaving only the new life that it personally created. Now, taking the full-scale offensive, mankind develops powerful ships, one of them being the RVA-818 X-LAY starfighter, to fight the oppressive machine by destroying the now-infected Earth entirely.

Near the end of the game, the pilots find themselves against Con-Human itself and destroy it. Then the pilots destroy the fortress's core, finally putting an end to the menace. The ending shows the fortress exploding and then the X-LAY is severely damaged as it could not escape the explosion drifting in space as the pilot's screen says "Mission Complete" before shutting down and the pilot's life reach the end.

== Development ==
RayForce was directed by Tatsuo Nakamura, assisted by designer and planner Tomohisa Yamashita and graphic designer Hideyuki Katou. During the mid-1990s, Japanese developer Taito had split up their development teams into three groups, one of which was the Kumagaya Research Group in Saitama; the three were moved to this division of the company. Taito specifically stated that the Kumagaya team wouldn't be able to make any shoot'em up games, to the dismay of several employees within the division; they tried multiple times to get the green light for a new shooter, but Taito executives denied these requests for not being "feasible". Even with these requests being denied, Nakamura and the others were determined to make a shooter, and decided to make a set of design documents to present to Taito higher-ups for approval. Looking for inspiration, Nakamura turned to Taito's earlier game Master of Weapon for its aerial top-down perspective, which he thought would work well with 3D visuals. He was also inspired by Namco's Xevious, which had a targeting reticule for firing bombs at ground-stationed targets; not wanting to simply repeat this, Nakamura decided on a lock-on laser that destroyed multiple enemies at once. Before presenting them to Taito, he showed the documents to the character designers and planners for additional feedback and to iron things out. After having it polished further from the project head of the Kumagaya group, he showed the game to company management, who liked the idea and allowed development to continue.

In contrast to most other shooters from the time period, the team chose not to include screen-clearing bombs for the players, so as to return to the older format of shooters where such weapons weren't present. When designing the lock-on laser, the production staff intended to make it so that players weren't able to lock onto more than four different enemies. One of the programmers shared their opinion to Nakamura for it being too difficult to implement, leading to the laser instead being able to target more than four enemies. A single laser shot out of the player's ship when using the lock-on as a visual cue for when to fire. The team chose to make the game world themed around "inorganic" substances, an idea previously used in Konami's Gradius. Nakamura intended to participate in the construction of the setting later on, however his boss instructed him to focus on programming instead. Due to their experience with designing Darius II, the production staff had little issue with balancing the game's difficulty.

For the game's graphics, Katou chose to use a metallic-esque look similar to Darius, despite the disgruntlement of the management. Nakamura created the software tools for making the graphics, with Katou cycling through different palettes and showing Nakamura which ones looked good, who promptly entered the data into the game. Katou used mostly white for enemies from a far distance so as to prevent them from blending into the background. The limitations of the Taito F3 System arcade hardware proved to be difficult to work with when designing levels, due to the hardware's scaling techniques with backgrounds and objects. As a work around, background objects were made to be simple geometrical shapes and cylinders, using similar techniques in Sega's Space Harrier. The arcade game Metal Black was the inspiration for the dust cloud effect in the second level. Early versions of the game were titled Layer Section, a nod to the multi-layered level designs. The team thought of using pre-rendered computer graphics for the visuals, however Namco's NebulasRay already employed the idea to the anger of Katou, leading the game to instead feature all-2D visuals. The music for the game was composed by Zuntata, Taito's "house band".

== Release ==
RayForce was presented at the 1993 Japan Amusement Machine Association (JAMMA) tradeshow in Japan. Before trademarking the title, Nakamura and the others requested all three Taito arcade departments to come up with alternative names for the game; Gunlock and RayForce were chosen, the latter becoming the official title. The game was officially released in Japan in February 1994, and in North America and Europe later that year.

== Reception ==
Reception

Review scores
Publication	Score
Next Generation	3/5 (SAT)
Maximum	3/5 (SAT)
Sega Saturn Magazine	79% (SAT)

In Japan, Game Machine listed RayForce on their April 1, 1994 issue as being the third most popular arcade unit at the time.

The Saturn version of the game received mixed reviews, with critics typically caught between its high quality design and its antiquated gameplay and stylistics. Rad Automatic of Sega Saturn Magazine stated that the game is fun but severely outdated in terms of both graphics and gameplay, though he did praise the absence of slowdown and the authentic arcade feel of the tate mode. A reviewer for Maximum similarly commented that the game falls into the retro genre without offering the nostalgia value found in most such releases, and further criticized that the tate mode "isn't very practical in execution (and not particularly healthy for your television)." While he acknowledged the game is fun, he noted it was being released alongside a host of top-quality Saturn titles (including Virtua Fighter 2 and Sega Rally Championship), and concluded, "Come on - be honest now - is this really the sort of game you coughed up £300 to play with your high-tech next generation gaming system? Playable it may be, but it's not really worth buying." A Next Generation critic agreed that Galactic Attack is dated and would appeal only to die-hard shooter fans, but nonetheless took the time to explain why shooter fans would enjoy it more than most games in the genre: "Aside from the fact that Galactic Attack is a super-fast action game, there is a definite feeling of quality development and several elements of smart game techniques that are displayed with this title. The best part about Galactic Attack, however, is that it offers everything a good space shooter should without any problems that may have shown up on a 16-bit system trying to do the same ... which means no slow down, even when a load of sprites are on the screen at once." GamePro gave the game a positive review, saying it "features gorgeous, space-themed backgrounds and a rockin' soundtrack. Although your ship is nothing to write home about, the enemies fly at you fast and furiously, giving your eyes a treat and your thumbs a workout. Resounding explosions, crisp voice-overs, and sharp laser blasts round out this quality game."

Though they did not review the game when it was released, in 1997 Electronic Gaming Monthly editors ranked the Saturn version as the 86th best console video game of all time, citing its dual-layer mechanic.

== Legacy ==
Taito initially worked on a sequel named R-Gear, again using sprite-based graphics. At some point this concept was abandoned in favor of RayStorm, which instead sported polygon-based 3D graphics.

A prequel, RayCrisis, was released in 1998.

The X-LAY appears as a downloadable ship in Taito's Dariusburst: Chronicle Saviours for PlayStation 4, PlayStation Vita, and Microsoft Windows.

=== Compilations ===
This game was released on Taito Memories in Japan, as well as Xbox and PC versions of Taito Legends 2, but these releases all run in upscanned 640x448 resolution, which results in slight flickering, no scanlines and slightly blurrier image compared to the arcade and Sega Saturn versions.

The game and its sequels would also get a rerelease in the Ray'z Arcade Chronology section.
