= Class of Heroes =

2008 video game

- Front cover of the US version
- Developer: Zero Div
- Publishers: JP: Acquire; NA: Atlus USA
- Platform: PlayStation Portable
- Release: JP: August 26, 2008; NA: June 9, 2009
- Genre: Role-playing
- Mode: Single-player

Class of Heroes (Note: Japanese: 剣と魔法と学園モノ。, Hepburn: Ken to Mahō to Gakuenmono. Lit: "Swords, magic, and school girls".) is a role-playing video game dungeon crawler for the PlayStation Portable developed by Zero Div and published by Acquire in Japan and Atlus in North America. In Japan, the game was released on August 26, 2008; in North America, the game was released on June 9, 2009, by Atlus. In the game, players progress by navigating dungeons as hordes of enemies appear and attack in turn-based combat. Class of Heroes received mixed reviews from critics, with some appreciating the creative take on dungeon-crawling and others disliking the game's graphics and grind-based leveling system.

An enhanced remake called Ken to Mahō to Gakuenmono Anniversary Edition was released for the Nintendo Switch in Japan on April 26, 2018.

== Gameplay ==
A female elf in the back row uses a ranged slingshot to attack an enemy monster.

Players begin the game by selecting characters for their party, choosing each individual's race, gender, stats, alignment, and major. Both race and gender are permanent, but a character's alignment and major can be changed when visiting a school. There are ten playable races in the game: Human, Elf, Dwarf, Erdgeist, Halfling, Sprite, Felpier, Drake, Diablon, and Celestian. Each race has different attitudes towards the others requiring a balance of compatibility to be struck. Each race is imbued with different strengths; e.g. Halflings are clever thieves and Drakes are able warriors. The party starts at Particus Academy which serves as a home base where players can regenerate Magic points, purchase equipment, start quests in the labyrinths, and practice alchemy on items obtained in mazes. Once a dungeon quest is started, enemies may be encountered randomly as players navigate the maze of corridors. The turn-based combat system during battles uses a row-based character line-up, where characters in the back rows with short-range weapons are unable to attack distant enemies. As players progress through the dungeon, a tension gauge accumulates after each battle allowing the party to use gambits during future engagements.

Within each dungeon is a magic lock which when opened allows future trips to the dungeon to be bypassed. Players are able to save their game at any time outside of combat and are also able to easily escape a dungeon when needed. Traps exist within the mazes, and an entire party can be taken out if accidentally sprung. When a party falls while journeying in a dungeon, players are revived back at their school. When a student falls the revival process can fail, and after two consecutive failures the student is deleted from the party.

== Development ==
Atlus announced Class of Heroes in a press release on January 20, 2009, with a prospective release date of April 7. On March 30, Atlus wrote in a press release that a critical bug was discovered in the game a few days before manufacturing began, and that the game would be delayed until June 9 to allow time to resolve the bug.

== Reception ==
Reception

Aggregate score
Aggregator	Score
Metacritic	61/100 (12 reviews)

Review scores
Publication	Score
GamePro	2.5/5
IGN	5.1/10
RPGamer	4.0/5

Class of Heroes received mixed reviews from critics, ranging from 30 to 83 on Metacritic with an overall rating of 61. IGN reviewer Ryan Clements panned the game for its choice of retro style mechanics, forcing players to grind for levels by dungeon crawling. Clements concedes that level-grinding can be satisfying, but only when coupled with good graphics, animations, battle mechanics, and storytelling, none of which, Clements writes, this game has. On the other hand, RPGamer's Glenn Wilson wrote that while typical first-person dungeon crawlers would only appeal to the most hardcore gamers, Class of Heroes "may well be the first playable, enjoyable, approachable, and universally fun game ever to grace this oft-maligned subgenre." Wilson praised the game's originality, balance, monster artwork, and creative dungeon design: "Class of Heroes succeeds at being a solid, well-balanced first person dungeon crawler."

== Legacy ==
=== Class of Heroes 2 ===
Class of Heroes 2 (Note: Japanese: 剣と魔法と学園モノ。2, Hepburn: Ken to Mahō to Gakuenmono Tsū) is the sequel to Class of Heroes released in Japan on June 24, 2009, and includes more jobs and majors for the characters. A Kickstarter project was initiated by MonkeyPaw Games and Gaijinworks to fund the localization and the production of the sequel's limited edition. Although the project did not fund, MonkeyPaw and Gaijinworks promised to continue the translation and release the game digitally with the game set to be released on PSN in mid 2013, and have started a signup to gauge interest on a possible limited physical release, which would also include a code to obtain the game digitally. The campaign proved successful, with 2700 signing up and even more people pre-ordering the game when the pre-sale started. About 200 physical copies were made available through the Canadian online shop Video Games Plus, the rest of the production run being exclusive to those who had pre-ordered via the Gaijinworks website until May 12, 2013. The copies sold at VGP are limited to one copy per customer and also do not come with download codes for digital copies. Also, fans could vote for the cover artwork used for the physical release, with people who had backed the unsuccessful Kickstarter campaign getting a special cover different from that of the copies pre-ordered on the website. The physical release had to be delayed when players of the digital version that was released on June 4, 2013, reported several bugs. The bugs were later fixed in an update to the digital version on October 15, 2013, and the UMD release started shipping in the same month. A remaster of the game is currently under development.

==== Class of Heroes 2G ====
A port of Class of Heroes 2 entitled Class of Heroes 2G (Note: Japanese: 剣と魔法と学園モノ。2G, Hepburn: Ken to Mahō to Gakuenmono Tsū Jī) was released on July 15, 2010, in Japan for the PlayStation 3. The port includes more dungeons, skills, party members, and also full voice acting for the characters. A North American PSN release is in the works as well as an extremely limited physical release which came out in December 2014. As with the previous game, a few hundred physical copies were made available through the Canadian online shop Video Games Plus, with the rest of the production run being exclusive to those who had pre-ordered via the Gaijinworks website. The digital release came to the US PlayStation Network (PSN) on June 2, 2015. Remaster Edition, was released worldwide for the Steam PC on April 26, 2024.

=== Class of Heroes 3 ===
The third entry, Class of Heroes 3, (Note: Japanese: 剣と魔法と学園モノ。3, Hepburn: Ken to Mahō to Gakuenmono Suri) was released in Japan on October 7, 2010, for PlayStation 3 and PlayStation Portable, with an English release (originally for PSP, but cancelled in 2017) originally slated for Spring 2018 on PlayStation 3, but never released. A remastered version of the game was announced in 2024 for PC (via Steam), PlayStation 5 and Nintendo Switch, and was released on September 18, 2025.

=== Ken to Mahō to Gakuenmono. 3D ===
Ken to Mahō to Gakuenmono. 3D (Note: Japanese: 剣と魔法と学園モノ。3D) was released in Japan on July 7, 2011, for Nintendo 3DS. The game was re-released as Ken to Mahō to Gakuenmono. Final: Shinnyusei wa Ohimesama! (Note: Japanese: 剣と魔法と学園モノ。Final 〜新入生はお姫様!〜) on October 13, 2011, for PlayStation Portable.

=== Shin Ken to Mahō to Gakuenmono. Toki no Gakuen ===
Shin Ken to Mahō to Gakuenmono. Toki no Gakuen (Note: Japanese: 新・剣と魔法と学園モノ。刻の学園) was released in Japan on July 19, 2012, for PlayStation Portable.

=== Adventure Academia: The Fractured Continent ===
Adventure Academia: The Fractured Continent, (Note: Japanese: 剣と魔法と学園クエスト。, Hepburn: Ken to Mahō to Gakuen Quest) was released in Japan on September 8, 2022, for the PlayStation 4, Nintendo Switch, and PC via Steam in Japanese and was released on December 9, 2022, in English.
