= RayCrisis =

1998 video game

- Arcade flyer
- Developer: Taito
- Publisher: Taito (Note: Published in North America by Working Designs and in Europe by JVC Music Europe for PlayStation; and in Japan by CyberFront Corporation, Mediakite, and Sourcenext for Microsoft Windows.)
- Composer: Tamayo Kawamoto
- Series: Ray
- Platforms: Arcade, PlayStation, Windows, iOS, Android, tvOS
- Release: Arcade; 1998; PlayStation: JP: 20 April 2000; NA: 25 October 2000; EU: 2000; Windows: JP: 5 October 2001; iOS, tvOS; 8 August 2017; Android; 9 August 2017
- Genre: Scrolling shooter
- Mode: Single-player
- Arcade system: Taito G-NET

RayCrisis (Note: Japanese: レイクライシス, Hepburn: ReiKuraishisu) is a 1998 vertically scrolling shooter arcade video game developed and published by Taito. A PlayStation home release was published in 2000 as RayCrisis: Series Termination. It is the third in the Ray series of games, serving as a prequel to RayForce.

== Gameplay ==
The player attacks enemy craft in the Self area, in the PlayStation version.

The gameplay of RayCrisis is based on RayForce, which features a viewpoint given to the player with an overhead perspective. The game is a vertically scrolling shooter with a "virus infiltration" theme: the player plays the role of the Waverider computer virus, and the enemies are Con-Human's antibodies, programmed to terminate any virus—including the player—inside the supercomputer's system.

An Encroachment system is added, which causes player to lose points when it reaches 100%, especially facing Dis-Human and Infinity prematurely when reaching a huge Antibody, in addition to a bad ending. Encroachment percentage can be lowered by deleting Antibodies, terminating huge Antibodies or obtaining items, keeping a low profile not to be recognized by Con-Human.

The game starts with Self-Area, followed by three other stages out of the following: Emotion, Consciousness, Intelligence, Memory, or Consideration, each reflecting Con-Human's details of sentience. After completing stage 4, having the emergency control activated by Con-Human because of the havoc the player have caused, the Waverider computer virus must fight against the Dis-Human Antibody, and Infinity, Con-Human's heart.

== Plot ==
RayCrisis, being a prequel to RayForce, details the events during the timeframe of the supercomputer called the Neuro-Computer Con-Human gaining sentience and rebelling against its human creators, a direct result of a misguided scientist trying to bond a human clone to Con-Human mentally. Now, against Con-Human's massive attack forces laying siege to the Earth, exterminating and cloning humans, a mecha-neurologist jacks in to the Con-Human system in an attempt to regain control of the rogue machine by means of the computer viruses, known as the Waveriders, into the Cybernetics Link, engaging Operation Raycrisis to cease the supercomputer's destructive actions permanently and prevent it from causing more havoc in the future.

However, even when Operation Raycrisis leaves Con-Human wrecked from the inside, it was too late to reverse the damage it has done. Furthermore, what is left of the human race has left for the space colonies as refuge from the destruction. In the end, years later, with the unveiling of the X-LAY starfighter and the ships of the fleet, Terran Command and the remaining humans initiate one final assault on Con-Human, who has turned the Earth into a bleak, metal graveyard. One final assault, in which will end the cybernetic nightmare once and for all, destroying the planet they've called home in the process.

== Release ==
In the PlayStation version, Stages 2, 3, and 4 can be freely chosen, and stages can be played more than once in a single game. An original mode is added, which allows player to fight all stages and obtain extra items in the game, but there is no continue option if the player loses all of their lives. This port is the only game in the series to include a customization feature that allows the player to choose between multiple colors for their selected ship; the arcade and smartphones versions did not include this feature, electing to give player 1 a red color scheme and player 2 blue. The Japanese version of the game supported a downloadable game called "Pocket Ray" for the PocketStation system. Since the PocketStation was not released in the U.S., the "Pocket Ray" minigame was removed from the American localization of RayCrisis by Working Designs.

The Windows 95 port of the game is also different from the PlayStation port.

This game was bundled with RayStorm as part of the compilation Simple 1500 Series Vol. 75: The Double Shooting.

== Reception ==
Reception

Aggregate score
Aggregator	Score
Metacritic	67/100

Review scores
Publication	Score
AllGame	3/5
CNET Gamecenter	7/10
Edge	4/10
Electronic Gaming Monthly	7/10 (Note: Three critics of Electronic Gaming Monthly gave the PlayStation version each a score of 8/10, 6/10, and 7/10.)
Eurogamer	4/10
Famitsu	26/40
Game Informer	7.25/10
GameFan	71%
IGN	8.1/10
Next Generation	3/5
Official U.S. PlayStation Magazine	3/5
TouchArcade	(iOS) 3/5

The PlayStation version received "average" reviews according to the review aggregation website Metacritic. Chris Charla of NextGen said that the game "looks fantastic and plays ok[ay], but if you're looking for the next R-Type, look elsewhere." In Japan, Famitsu gave it a score of 26 out of 40.

Also in Japan, Game Machine listed the arcade version in their 1 February 1999 issue as the tenth most-successful arcade game of the year.

== See also ==
- RayForce
- RayStorm
