= Summon Night 5 =

2013 video game

- Japanese box art
- Developer: Felistella
- Publishers: JP: Bandai Namco Games; NA: Gaijinworks
- Directors: Keitarō Yoshida; Tomoaki Andō
- Artist: Takeshi Iizuka (character design)
- Writers: Akira Kareno; Shirō Yamauchi
- Series: Summon Night
- Platform: PlayStation Portable
- Release: JP: May 16, 2013; NA: December 15, 2015
- Genre: Tactical RPG
- Mode: Single-player

Summon Night 5 (サモンナイト5, Samon Naito Faibu) is a tactical role-playing game in the long-running Summon Night series of video games. It is the first and only original entry to be developed by Felistella and published by Bandai Namco Games, following original developer, Flight-Plan's, closure in 2010, and original publisher Banpresto being acquired by Bandai Namco. The game was released in Japan on May 16, 2013 for the PlayStation Portable. Almost two years after its initial Japan release, in April 2015, Gaijinworks announced that they would publish the game in English in North America and Europe sometime in 2015. It was released digitally in North America on December 15, 2015, and received a limited-edition physical release on April 7, 2016. The game was considered a success in English regions, with its sales being enough to warrant Gaijinworks to translate its sequel, Summon Night 6, which was released in 2017.

== Gameplay ==
Similar to the past main numbered entries in the series, the game is played as a tactical role-playing game with elements of a visual novel. The game involves the player moving characters in a turn based fashion across a large grid from an adjustable isometric perspective. At the beginning of the game, the player can choose to play as either a male or female protagonist, and chose from 4 separate "Cross" (partner) characters. Which combinations are selected affect both the dialogue and story progression, leading to eight separate paths to take through the game.

As in most tactical RPGs, the goal is for the player to strategically move their characters across the grid, to defeat the AI-controlled opponent's team of characters. This is generally done by moving characters in certain positions to attack the opposing character. Attacks take away from a character hit points, losing all hitpoints eliminate characters from battle, and the team without any characters left loses. In addition to this general flow of battle, the game also uses the "Brave Battle System". A player's team contains a numerical "Brave Points" value that represents the team's morale for the fight. When bad actions occur, such as a character of the player dying, brave points are lost, and if they drop to zero, the battle is over and lost. Conversely, by carrying out certain positive actions, such as fulfilling "brave conditions", such as being the first to initiate an attack, or defeating a certain number of a certain enemy type, results in gaining more brave points. Successfully completing brave conditions may also result in gaining "brave medals", which in turn can be used to purchase new attacks and abilities for characters to use in future battles.

== Plot ==
The game's story takes place 200 to 300 years after the events of Summon Night 3, in an alternate parallel dimension, and contains references to the past game's world and characters. The game follows one of two main protagonists, determined by the player's selection: Folth, the male character, who has a "gun-arm" that shoots out "energy-hands", or Arca, the female character, who uses a pole arm as a weapon. The player may also choose one of four "Cross characters" to partner their selected protagonist with, with different combinations leading to different weapons and abilities becoming available. Each character is from each of one of the game's four worlds; Pariet from the Phantom Beast World, Kagero is from the Ogre world, Spinel is from the Spirit World, and Dyth is from the Machine World.

== Development ==
In 2010, Summon Night series developer Flight-Plan closed down, leaving the future of the series in question. While the rights were transferred to Banpresto, which in turn transferred to Bandai Namco, the game's official community website proceeded to be taken off-line afterwards in 2011. However, in July 2012, Bandai Namco Games announced that not only would they be re-releasing the first four titles in the main series of games, but also creating a fifth entry in the series, all on the PlayStation Portable. In order to build up excitement and demand for the fifth entry, Bandai Namco would release Summon Night and Summon Night 2 as PlayStation Classics (playable on PSPs), and release Summon Night 3 and Summon Night 4 as enhanced remakes. Summon Night 5 itself was first announced in an issue of V Jump magazine, with more details being revealed later in the month. Upon the game's official website going live, it was revealed that despite the game being developed by a new company, Felistella, a few key staff members from prior games were revealed to still be involved, including character designer Takeshi Iizuka and scenario writer Kei Miyakozuki. Additionally, it was announced that Ufotable, creators of the anime videos for Tales of Xillia and Tales of Xillia 2, will be making the game's anime cutscenes, and Emiko Bleu would perform the game's opening theme song, which would be produced by Sing Like Talking band member Chiaki Fujita. The game marks the transition from the 2D sprite based graphics to 3D polygonal graphics for both the characters and battle environments. Story scenes contain special character portraits utilizing an effect dubbed "Live2D" technology to provide animations for the character's conversations.

=== Localization ===
The game was released on May 16, 2013 in Japan. Almost two years after its initial release, Gaijinworks announced that it, in conjunction with MonkeyPaw Games, would localize the game into English and release it sometime in 2015 in North America and Europe. They announced that polls would later be released to gauge interest for a physical UMD release of the game. Victor Ireland of Gaijinworks announced that the game would not receive an English dub, stating that it was not within the game's budget. He stated that the game would need projected figures of 25,000 to 30,000 copies sold to warrant a dub, where as their internal projections placed the game closer to "teens or low 20,[000]s". While no exact numbers have been released, Ireland has stated that the success of the game lead the company to be able to begin work on translating its sequel, Summon Night 6, in 2016, with it being released in across late 2017.

== Reception ==
Reception

Aggregate score
Aggregator	Score
Metacritic	74/100

Review scores
Publication	Score
Push Square	7/10
RPGFan	85/100

All four Famitsu reviewers awarded the game an 8 out of 10 score, with a collective "8/8/8/8 [32/40]" score. Destructoid praised the game's for its "slick anime art style". Hardcore Gamer gave the game a 4 out of 5 saying Summon Night 5 is "a love letter to fans of a somewhat bygone era of Japanese roleplaying games and manages to deliver on nearly all fronts, be it story, characterization, gameplay or presentation." The game debuted as the top selling game in Japan in its initial week of release, selling 105,511 copies.
