= Gungriffon Blaze =

2000 mech simulation video game

GunGriffon Blaze
- North American version cover art
- Developer: Game Arts
- Publishers: JP: Capcom; NA: Working Designs; EU: Swing! Entertainment
- Platform: PlayStation 2
- Release: JP: August 10, 2000; NA: October 26, 2000; EU: July 12, 2002
- Genre: Vehicle simulation
- Mode: Single-player

GunGriffon Blaze (Note: Japanese: ガングリフォン ブレイズ, Hepburn: GanGurifon Bureizu) is a video game developed by Game Arts and published by Capcom and Working Designs in 2000, and by Swing! Entertainment in Europe in 2002 for PlayStation 2. The game was a launch title on the PlayStation 2 in North America.

== Reception ==
Reception

Aggregate score
Aggregator	Score
Metacritic	73/100

Review scores
Publication	Score
AllGame	2.5/5
CNET Gamecenter	6/10
Edge	7/10
Electronic Gaming Monthly	6.83/10 (Note: In Electronic Gaming Monthly's review of the game, two critics gave it each a score of 7/10, and the other gave it 6.5/10.)
Eurogamer	8/10
Famitsu	33/40
Game Informer	7/10
GameFan	(MVS) 83% 76% (Note: In GameFan's viewpoint of the Japanese import, three critics gave it each a score of 70, 85, and 73.)
GameSpot	7.6/10
IGN	8.4/10
Next Generation	3/5
Official U.S. PlayStation Magazine	3.5/5

The game received "average" reviews according to the review aggregation website Metacritic. Eric Bratcher of NextGen said, "If you can buy one mech game, [Armored Core 2] will give you more for your money. But if you can afford two, this title is well worth your time." In Japan, Famitsu gave it a score of 33 out of 40.

The game was a runner-up for "Action Game of 2000" Editors' Choice award at IGN's Best of 2000 Awards for PlayStation 2, which went to TimeSplitters.
