= Summon Night 6 =

2016 video game

Summon Night 6: Lost Borders
- Japanese cover art
- Developer: Media.Vision (Note: Additional work by Felistella)
- Publishers: JP: Bandai Namco Entertainment; WW: Gaijinworks
- Producer: Kazumasa Habu
- Platforms: PlayStation Vita; PlayStation 4
- Release: JP: March 10, 2016; NA: October 31, 2017; EU: November 15, 2017
- Genre: Tactical RPG
- Mode: Single-player

Summon Night 6: Lost Borders (Note: Japanese: サモンナイト６ 失われた境界たち, Hepburn: Samon Naito Shikkusu Ushinawareta Kyōkai Tachi) is a tactical role-playing game for the PlayStation Vita and PlayStation 4 video game consoles. The game was released in Japan on March 10, 2016, and was released in North America on October 31, 2017 and Europe on November 15, 2017 by publisher Gaijinworks. While it is the sixth numbered entry in the mainline entries of the Summon Night series, it is only the second one to be translated into English, after 2015's release of Summon Night 5, also by Gaijinworks.

== Gameplay ==
Similar to prior mainline entries in the Summon Night video game series, the game plays as a strategic/tactical role-playing video game, with elements of visual novels. In addition to the core gameplay, it will also feature multiple mini-games as well.

== Story ==
The game takes place in the world of Fillujah, a world where all people have their own flying companion creature. The core three members of the cast (Raj, Amu, and Ist) are the primary protagonists, while the game plot involves them meeting up with characters from across the entire Summon Night series.

== Development ==
The game was first announced in August 2015, through a revealing in V Jump magazine.

In June 2016, Gaijinworks announced they would be releasing the game in English in Q1 2017 in North America and Europe. The game is the second mainline Summon Night video game to be translated and released in English regions, after the prior entry, Summon Night 5. Victor Ireland of Gaijinworks announced that the game would be one of his biggest game translation undertakings, with the game script amounting to the equivalent of five novels, 50% larger than the size of the already large Summon Night 5. The company began translating the title in January 2016, with the full game not being due out for release until at least a year after they began, in Q1 2017. Ireland cited the popularity of the PS4 as the main reason for translating the title, stating that releasing it for its large userbase was the best way to bring popularity to the previously niche series. The game saw a physical release in North America, but was exclusively a digital download in Europe.

== Reception and sales ==
Reception

Aggregate score
Aggregator	Score
Metacritic	PS4: 71/100

Review scores
Publication	Score
RPGamer	3/5
RPGFan	80/100

The game debuted a number 3 on the Japanese charts with its Vita release, with 40,076 units sold, and number 6 with its PS4 release, selling an additional 16,750 units, totaling for 56,826 sold in its first week. This was around half of the prior game's releases, Summon Night 4 and Summon Night 5, which both sold over 100,000 copies in their debut week.

The PS4 version of Summon Night 6 has now been removed from the PlayStation store for unknown reasons.
