= Vanguard Bandits =

1998 video game

- North American cover art
- Developer: Human Entertainment
- Publishers: JP: Human Entertainment; NA: Working Designs
- Composers: Kouji Niikura; Chiyomaru Shikura
- Platform: PlayStation
- Release: JP: July 30, 1998; NA: June 28, 2000
- Genre: Tactical role-playing
- Mode: Single-player

Vanguard Bandits, known in Japan as Epica Stella, (Note: Japanese: エピカ・ステラ, Hepburn: Epika Sutera) is a tactical role-playing game (RPG) developed by Human Entertainment and originally released in Japan for the PlayStation on July 30, 1998. It was published in North America by Working Designs.

Vanguard Bandits is a support-centric strategy RPG featuring tactical combat in a medieval fantasy world in which knights and soldiers pilot mecha. This game takes place on the Continent of Eptina where numerous battles have taken place over territory, goods, and beliefs. In the midst of the conflict archaeologists in the Pharastia Kingdom discovered giant armored mecha that they called ATACs, or All Terrain Armored Combatants, that could be controlled by the thoughts of the pilot seated inside the unit's head. The Kingdom used the power of these ATACs to assume control of the entire continent, and then decided to use them to keep the peace in their new territories. Pharastia soon began to lose control as Coup d'etats and civil wars erupted which left it in a defeated state, with only their standing army remaining.

== Gameplay ==
Vanguard Bandits is an RPG strategy game played on an isometric grid of squares with representations of all the player and computer controlled ATACs, similar to Final Fantasy Tactics and the Front Mission series by Square. Each character can move around on the grid, attack, and perform support abilities. All actions during that ATACs turn takes up AP (Actions Points), and attacks produce FP (Fatigue Points). If the Fatigue Points reach maximum, the pilot becomes unable to perform any actions until he/she awakens, leaving him/her open to attack. When an ATAC unit attacks or defends from an attack, a detailed three-dimensional battle animation with music is shown over the normal grid. Between each battle is a story cutscene where the characters within the ATACs are represented on a similar grid and can interact and further the story line.

The player progresses through a total of 20 missions in one of three different story lines. Different battles and events happen based on the choices of the character within certain story scenes between battles, a character's level, or the morale of the group. Notably, if Bastion reaches a high enough level by the end of the third mission, he will be faced with the choice of whether to remain with his companions on the Kingdom branch or to chase after the game's villain, ultimately reaching the Empire branch. Each of these branches has two endings, the Kingdom branch depending on the overall morale of the characters and the Empire branch depending on Bastion's relationship with two female characters. Players who have beaten the game once are given the option of switching from the Kingdom branch to the whimsical, pessimistic, non-serious Ruin branch.

=== Combat ===
Each ATAC has a number of attacks available to it, depending on its weapon and gemstone; many major characters also have one (or more) special attacks not available to other characters in the game. Each attack deals a different amount on damage and has a different chance of hitting the target (affected, of course, by the character's own stats). Most attacks can only be made on adjacent squares; some can hit enemies further away, the Turbulence attack in particular having a range of four squares. Attacks from the side and rear have higher success rates and leave the defender fewer options; thus, flanking is a vital strategy in Vanguard Bandits.

Attacks can be classified into three types:

- Normal: Standard attack. Most attacks fall into this category.
- Knockdown: If the attack succeeds, the defender is knocked down and thus unable to respond with a counterattack. Selecting the Defend option prevents the defending ATAC from falling over.
- Collision: Used only by particularly heavy attacks, collision rams the defending ATAC full force, always toppling it unless the attack is evaded or parried.

Additionally, some attacks can cause temporary negative status effects on the victim, such as reduced speed or attack power.

When attacked, the defending ATAC has several options:

- Attack: Once the attacker has carried out their attack, the defender responds with an attack of their own. While this can cause significant damage, it also costs high FP (all AP costs are converted to FP for the purpose of counterattacking). Additionally, the counterattack will be canceled if the attacker uses a successful Knockdown or Collision attack. It cannot be used against rear attacks.
- Defend: The defender braces themselves and takes defensive maneuvers, thus reducing the damage received. It costs 30 FP and cannot be used against rear attacks.
- Avoid: The defender attempts to avoid the attack, thus preventing any damage. This is the only move that can be performed against rear attacks, and costs 20 FP.
- Counter: The defender preempts the enemy attack, thus doing damage while protecting oneself from harm, but if it fails the defender receives more damage. It can be only used against frontal attacks and costs 20 FP. If the defending character has the appropriate skill, some enemy attacks can also be parried, resulting in no damage to the defender.

As well as attacks designed to inflict damage, players can also use special abilities which assist friendly ATACs, such as increasing a stat, recovering HP or reducing FP. One skill, Turn Quake, is designed to be used on enemies; it rotates them in a random direction.

Terrain plays an important role in the game. Moving across difficult terrain such as forests and deserts requires more AP than normal, although not all ATACs suffer equally from this effect (some not at all). Some terrain is completely impassable.

== The ATACs ==
All-Terrain Armored Combatants, or ATACs, are the main fighting force of the various armies in the game; the entire combat system revolves around them. They are large bipedal, humanoid (though one ATAC is a quadruped) mechs powered by gemstones. Despite their high technological complexity, ATACs still utilize traditional weapons such as swords and spears, but they can also use special attacks such as fireballs, earthquakes, flying shards of ice and tornadoes, depending on their gemstone.

ATACs that existed before the game takes place are called "Excavated ATACs". These were built by Eptina's original inhabitants and were discovered by archaeologists of the continent's current settlers. These machines became the basis for modern ATACs though none created since have surpassed an Excavated ATAC on the combat field. Each ruler of Eptina possesses an Excavated ATAC.

== Development ==
Prior to its North American release, Vanguard Bandits was titled Detonator Gauntlet by Working Designs, but Midway forced the company to change it due to its similarity to the Gauntlet series of action-fantasy games. The North American release included a bonus demo disc of Lunar 2: Eternal Blue Complete for PlayStation.

== Reception ==
Reception

Aggregate score
Aggregator	Score
Metacritic	62/100

Review scores
Publication	Score
Electronic Gaming Monthly	5.5/10
Game Informer	7.75/10
GameSpot	6.2/10
IGN	6.5/10
Next Generation	3/5
Official U.S. PlayStation Magazine	2.5/5
PlayStation: The Official Magazine	3/5
RPGamer	(2000) 9/10 (2013) 3.5/5

The game received "mixed" reviews according to the review aggregation website Metacritic. Eric Bratcher of Next Generation was positive to the game, commending the story, characters, and gameplay, but said that it did not brought anything new to the genre. Game Informer gave it a favorable review, about two months before the game was released Stateside.
