= Lunar: Silver Star Harmony =

2009 video game

- North American cover art
- Developer: Game Arts
- Publishers: JP: GungHo Works; NA: Xseed Games; PAL: Game Arts
- Series: Lunar
- Platform: PlayStation Portable
- Release: JP: November 12, 2009; NA: March 2, 2010; PAL: October 27, 2010
- Genre: Role-playing
- Mode: Single-player

Lunar: Silver Star Harmony, known in Japan as Lunar: Harmony of Silver Star (Note: Japanese: LUNAR(ルナ) ハーモニー オブ シルバースター, Hepburn: Runa: Hāmonī obu Shirubā Sutā), is the third remake of the 1992 role-playing video game Lunar: The Silver Star. It was developed by Game Arts in 2009 and released exclusively for the PlayStation Portable by GungHo Works in Japan, by Xseed Games North America, and by Game Arts in Europe and Australia (PSN only).

== Gameplay ==
Lunar: Silver Star Harmony is a traditional, top-down role-playing video game featuring two-dimensional character and background graphics. While it retains the animated cutscenes from Lunar: Silver Star Story Complete, it features a new isometric view, a hand-drawn style for the characters and backgrounds, a more talkative lead character, a remixed soundtrack, new voice-acting and a new English localization. The gameplay itself remains the same, although it incorporates improvements from Lunar 2: Eternal Blue Complete as well as ultimate attacks akin to Final Fantasy's Limit Breaks.

== Plot ==
The story of Lunar: Silver Star Harmony is identical to Lunar: Silver Star Story Complete, with the exception of an additional short playable prologue featuring the original Four Heroes (Dragonmaster Dyne, Ghaleon, Mel D'Alkirk and Lemia Ausa) and their final fight against dark wizard Eiphel and his allies, the Five Princes of the Black Star, who have abducted the previous incarnation of the Goddess Althena.

== Release ==
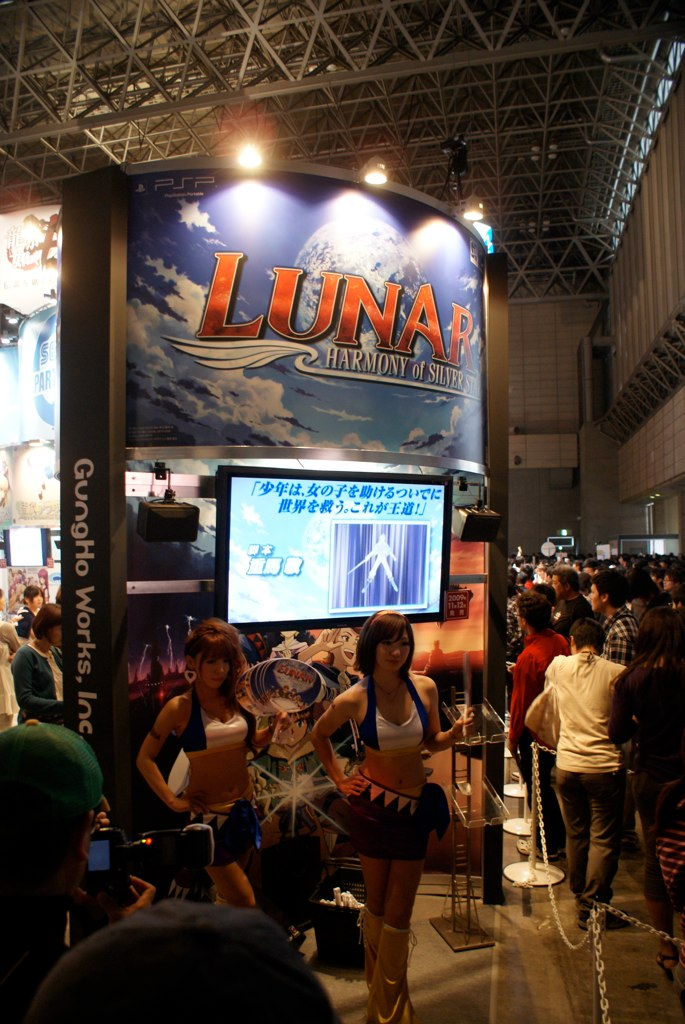
Lunar: Silver Star Harmony promo at GungHo Works booth, Tokyo Game Show 2009

Xseed Games acquired the publishing rights of Lunar: Silver Star Harmony for North America; originally set to be released on February 12, 2010, the game was later delayed until February 23, then March 2. At release, a limited edition of the game was also available, which includes a soundtrack CD and full set of bromides featuring the female characters.

== Reception ==
Reception

Aggregate score
Aggregator	Score
Metacritic	80/100

Review scores
Publication	Score
1Up.com	B+
Game Informer	8/10
GamePro	3.5/5
GameRevolution	B+
GameSpot	8/10
GameZone	8/10
IGN	8.2/10
PlayStation: The Official Magazine	4/5
RPGamer	3.5/5
RPGFan	90%
The Escapist	3/5

The game received a score of 80/100 suggesting "favorable" reviews on Metacritic.

David Clayman of IGN gave the game a 8.2/10, praising the remake's visuals, as well it's writing and story, but felt the combat system "shows its age and will eventually bore some players[...] used to the more complicated or action-based battle systems found in Crisis Core or Dissidia [and] might be surprised by Lunar's simplicity."
