= Magic Knight Rayearth (video game) =

1995 video game

- North American cover art
- Developer: Sega
- Publishers: JP: Sega; NA: Working Designs
- Director: Rieko Kodama
- Producers: Hikihiro Iwata; Keitaro Motonage; Tatsuo Yamada
- Designers: Akihiko Mukaiyama; Tomohiro Nimura
- Programmer: Michiharu Nakamura
- Artists: Atsuko Ishida; Tsutomu Ishigaki; Yasushi Yamaguchi
- Writer: Akinori Nishiyama
- Composers: Yayoi Wachi; Seirou Okamoto
- Series: Magic Knight Rayearth
- Platform: Saturn
- Release: JP: 25 August 1995; NA: 11 December 1998
- Genre: Action role-playing
- Mode: Single-player

Magic Knight Rayearth (Note: Japanese: 魔法騎士(マジックナイト)レイアース, Hepburn: Majikku Naito Reiāsu) is a 1995 action role-playing video game developed and published by Sega for the Saturn. It is based on the anime series of the same title, and focuses on three characters who travel the world of Cephiro to rescue an abducted princess named Emerald. Though one of the first games announced for the Saturn, it became the last Saturn game released in North America, chiefly due to its prolonged localization. The game was released in North America by Working Designs in 1998.

At least five other video games based on the anime series have been released: two for the Game Boy (the second one with the title Magic Knight Rayearth 2nd: The Missing Colors), one for the Super Famicom, and two for the Game Gear (the second game subtitled "Making of Magic Knight"). All six are completely different games, not ports.

== Plot ==
Though there are a number of events which are exclusive to the video game, the game's plot is very similar to the first story arc in the manga and anime, with eighth-grade girls Hikaru Shidou, Umi Ryuuzaki and Fuu Hououji finding themselves drawn from their respective field trips to the Tokyo Tower into the world of Cephiro. There, Master Mage Clef informs them that, in order to return to Tokyo, the three girls must become the Magic Knights and rescue Cephiro's current Pillar, Princess Emeraude (named as Princess Emerald in the English version), from her abductor, the high priest and antagonist Zagato (named as Zagat in the English version).

All of the characters from the first arc of the manga are present in the game, as well as anime-exclusive character Inouva. However, the game presents several new locations and characters, thus considerably expanding the overall plot. The player can also read each of the girls' journals, which receive new entries after key events in the game, providing their individual insights on the events.

Unlike in the manga and anime, all of Zagato's minions die throughout the game, including Ascot, Caldina and Rafarga.

== Gameplay ==
Screenshot depicting the three protagonists: Hikaru, Umi, and Fuu

Throughout the game, the player controls a party consisting of Hikaru, Umi and Fuu, although only one character can fight at a time. The other two follow the active character and are not affected by enemy attacks. Players can switch between the three characters at any time, using their individual weapons and magical abilities to overcome enemies and environmental obstacles.

The game features an illustrated diary system in which Hikaru, Umi and Fuu record their experiences and reactions to events from their individual perspectives. Each character also possesses distinct elemental magic, with Hikaru using fire, Umi water and Fuu wind.

Unlike traditional role-playing games, Magic Knight Rayearth does not use an experience-point system. Character progression, including improvements to weapons and the acquisition of spells, is largely determined by story events. The player can independently increase each character's maximum health and magic points by collecting Heart Jewels and Magic Jewels, respectively.

Each protagonist uses a different weapon, unlike their predominantly sword-based fighting styles in the original anime and manga. Hikaru attacks with a sword that covers a relatively wide area at close range, Umi uses a foil for forward thrusting attacks, and Fuu employs a bow and arrow for ranged combat. Fuu later acquires an upgrade that allows her arrows to lock onto enemies.

== Development ==
Magic Knight Rayearth is based on the anime by Clamp of the same name. The game was one of 12 Sega Saturn games announced when the system was first unveiled at the June 1994 Tokyo Toy Show.

The Saturn adaptation was directed by Rieko Kodama, marking her first project as a game director. Kodama later recalled that she may have been assigned the role partly because Sega considered a female director suitable for an adaptation of a shōjo manga. Already familiar with CLAMP's work, she also contributed pixel artwork to some of the game's event animations when the development team was struggling to meet its deadline.

Sega artist Tōru Yoshida later recalled that the game had been developed concurrently with Blue Seed: Kushinada Hiroku, with staff from the latter project joining the Magic Knight Rayearth development team following its completion.

The game incorporated animated sequences produced for the Saturn adaptation, alongside material based on the television anime. The developers also introduced original story events and characters, while seeking to preserve the visual style and personalities of the source material.

== Localization ==
The localization of the game was handled by Working Designs. In an interview published in June 1996, the company said that the game was one of the biggest localization projects the company had ever undertaken. They pointed to the audio and dubbing alone taking up to several months to complete, and the game's large amount of text as reasons for why the project was so big. The North American release was originally scheduled for July 1996, but was repeatedly postponed before Working Designs announced that the game was shipping to retailers on December 11, 1998.

Working Designs made a number of changes to the game in the localization process. As they regarded the Japanese version to be too easy, they enhanced the enemies' artificial intelligence and made them faster to increase the difficulty. As noted in the instruction booklet, Working Designs' opening animation would have mimicked the Japanese version of the game (gems morphing into the logo) but once Working Designs "were made aware of a logo created for the English Rayearth" by Media Blasters, they decided to change the opening to incorporate the new logo. They also left out the voice acting for inconsequential town dialogue which appeared in the Japanese version, instead adding voice acting to the player characters' diary entries, as well as rendering the diary text to appear handwritten.

The localization was complicated by a hard disk crash in Japan that resulted in the loss of development data following completion of the original game. In a June 1998 interview, Working Designs president Victor Ireland explained that missing material included graphics, lip-synchronization files and animation data, particularly files required for the opening sequence. The company had to reconstruct portions of the missing material, contributing to the prolonged localization process.

Working Designs was unable to obtain the rights to the original Japanese opening theme, "Yuzurenai Negai", performed by Naomi Tamura. Instead, the company created a new English-language opening song, "Daring Dreams", intended to retain the feel of the original. The song was performed by Jennifer Stigile, with lyrics credited to Working Designs president Victor Ireland.

The North American release featured three alternative CD label designs, each depicting one of the game's three protagonists. Working Designs president Victor Ireland later confirmed that the three variations had been manufactured in equal quantities.

== Reception ==
Reception

Aggregate score
Aggregator	Score
GameRankings	70.03%

Review scores
Publication	Score
Electronic Gaming Monthly	7.12/10
Famitsu	26/40
Game Informer	7/10
GameSpot	5.1/10
Sega Saturn Magazine (JP)	8.3/10
Consoles+	94% 93%
GameFan	95/100
Video Games	75/100
Gamers' Republic	A
Ação Games	8.8/10
Gamers	3.3/5

The game currently holds a 70.03% average on GameRankings.

On release in Japan, in 1995, Famitsu magazine scored the game a 26 out of 40. The localized version received mild to positive scores upon its release in North America in 1998. The game received a 5.1 mediocre review from Andrew Vestal of GameSpot. Though he found no problems with the game itself, he considered the localization of a three-year-old game to be a wasted effort due to the aging of the graphics, concluding that "Magic Knight Rayearth is too little, too late". Game Informer scored the game 7 out of 10, and called it rather dated. EGM scored the game 7.12 out of 10.

Retro Gamer included it on their list of ten essential Saturn imports as "easily the best playable import RPG, thanks to a highly entertaining localisation by Working Designs, its fun combat system (you effectively control one character at a time, switching between them tag-team style) and some delightful 2D visuals".
