= Lunar: Silver Star Story Complete =

1996 video game

- North American PlayStation box art
- Developers: Game Arts (Note: Ported to PlayStation by Alfa System); Japan Art Media
- Publishers: JP: Kadokawa Shoten (SS, PS1), DigiCube (PC); NA: Working Designs (PS1); WW: SoMoGa (iOS, Android)
- Artist: Toshiyuki Kubooka
- Composer: Noriyuki Iwadare
- Series: Lunar
- Platforms: Sega Saturn, PlayStation, Windows, iOS, Android
- Release: October 25, 1996: Saturn; JP: October 25, 1996; JP: July 4, 1997 (MPEG) PlayStation; JP: May 28, 1998; NA: May 28, 1999 Windows; JP: December 8, 1999; KR: May 2000 iOS; WW: September 20, 2012 Android; WW: January 26, 2024
- Genre: Role-playing
- Mode: Single-player

Lunar: Silver Star Story Complete, originally released in Japan as simply Lunar: Silver Star Story, (Note: Japanese: LUNAR(ルナ)~シルバースターストーリー, Hepburn: Runa ~ Shirubā Sutā Sutōrī) is a 1996 role-playing video game developed by Game Arts and Japan Art Media and published by Kadokawa Shoten. It is a remake of 1992's Lunar: The Silver Star. While the overall plot remains true to the original, accommodations are made to the game's story to allow for a larger, richer cast, as well as additional scenarios.

Initially released on the Sega Saturn in 1996, the game has gone through several variations, beginning with enhanced video support in conjunction with the Saturn's MPEG graphics add-on in 1997, and later being ported to Sony's PlayStation by Alfa System in 1998. In May 1999, the PlayStation version was published in North America by Working Designs, who had previously released the original game in the region, using that particular name used in the updated version on Sega Saturn. An enhanced version is included in the Lunar Remastered Collection, released in April 2025 for Nintendo Switch, PlayStation 4, Windows, and Xbox One.

Like its forerunner, the game follows the exploits of Alex, a young boy from a small, humble town who enters a life of adventure and intrigue after being chosen as the heir-apparent to the title of "Dragonmaster", guardian of the forces of the planet. With the help of his expanding band of companions, Alex must pass the trials set by ancient dragons to claim his place in history, and stop a powerful sorcerer and former hero from controlling the world.

Since its English release, Silver Star Story has garnered much attention from critics for its use of fluid full-motion animated sequences, lavish game packaging, and quality of the English script. The game was followed by a sequel, Lunar 2: Eternal Blue Complete, in 1998. Two more remakes of Lunar: The Silver Star, Lunar Legend and Lunar: Silver Star Harmony, were released in 2002 by Media Rings and Ubisoft and in 2009 by GungHo Online Entertainment and Xseed Games, respectively.

== Gameplay ==
A battle scene in Silver Star Story Complete

Silver Star Story Complete is a traditional, top-down role-playing video game featuring two-dimensional character and background graphics. Using the Sega Saturn and PlayStation's advanced hardware, many elements of the original game's presentation have been altered, including a larger color palette, more sophisticated visual effects, and improved sound quality. The story is interspersed with fully animated cut scenes. Players advance the narrative by completing story-based objectives and interacting with non-player characters. In the original version, players encountered enemy monsters randomly every few steps when traveling in a harsh environments, while the remake makes enemies visible, with combat ensuing only after a character has come in contact with one. In addition, there are no monsters in the overworld, as there were in the original.

Many of the game's new battle features were adapted from Lunar: Eternal Blue, including the auto-battle feature that allows players to set moves and actions in advance. While in combat, a player may choose to attack an enemy, move about the battlefield, use magic or items, stand their ground and defend, or flee the battle entirely. Silver Star Story Complete retains the original version's movement feature, which requires characters to be within a certain distance of an enemy before it can be attacked. Battles are won when all enemies are defeated, yielding experience points that allow characters to gain levels, making them stronger as well as allowing access to better abilities. By gaining levels, as well as finding or purchasing increasingly more powerful weapons and armor, characters can battle increasingly more powerful enemies as the game progresses. Bosses will have their abilities scaled to the party's level with no limit.

== Plot ==
=== Characters ===
The cast of The Silver Star all return for the game's remake, retaining their original designs by anime and manga artist Toshiyuki Kubooka. Players assume the role of Alex, who is joined by a menagerie of playable and supporting characters who aid him on his quest.

- Alex - a young boy from a small town who dreams of becoming an adventurer like his idol, Dyne.
- Luna - his childhood friend and sweetheart
- Nall - a winged, white, cat-like creature with an uncertain origin, later learned to be a baby dragon
- Ramus - son of the town mayor with dreams of becoming a rich businessman
- Nash - a boisterous magician-in-training from a prestigious magic school
- Mia - quiet daughter of the magic guild's headmistress
- Jessica - a tomboyish priestess
- Kyle - a self-absorbed vagrant and ladies' man as well as Jessica's strained boyfriend.

Each character's personalities were expanded for the new version to make them easier for the player to relate to, and give each of them more presence in the game's story. As the game's designers felt that Luna was lacking presence in the original game, she was included in the player's party for a longer period and her past was expanded by giving her confounding dream sequences.

Ghaleon, a dark magician who seeks godhood, serves as the primary antagonist, and initially appears as an ally to Alex's cause. In the new version, Ghaleon's personality is altered to make him a more sympathetic character. Motivation for his plans to rule the world were shifted from revenge to misplaced concern for humanity not having a true leader. He is still undeniably ruthless and cruel, however. Game Arts added new villains to the story, feeling that the game's opposition lacked enough characterization. These include Royce and Phacia, two powerful sorceresses who are sisters to Xenobia, Ghaleon's top general who appeared in the original as his sole underling (who, in this version, actually has romantic feelings for him).

=== Story ===
The plot of Silver Star Story Complete remains true to the original Sega CD version written by Kei Shigema. Novelist Keisuke Shigematsu was recruited as the remake's scenario writer, and was tasked with expanding the previous script written by Shigema to make the game more current. As in the original version, players assume the role of Alex, a young boy who hopes to become a great hero like his idol, the legendary Dragonmaster Dyne. At the insistence of his fortune-hunting friend Ramus, Alex travels to the nearby Dragon's Cave with his cat-like companion Nall, and sweetheart Luna, to seek a precious gem. When the team reaches the cave's interior, they find Quark, an aged, wise dragon who sees hidden potential in Alex, and beckons him to travel the world and become its protector as the new Dragonmaster. Returning home, the group expresses mutual interest in Alex's quest; Ramus wishes to sell the dragon gem at a large city, Nall wants to find out what he is, and Luna merely to protect Alex. The group sets off across the frontier to the port town of Saith to continue their journey.

An animated sequence with Luna singing "Wind's Nocturne", created by combining traditional and computer animation

Traveling through the Weird Woods, Luna sings a magic song to clear a patch of thick fog in their path, yet is not sure how she knew it would work. The group is surrounded by a horde of monsters, and are defended by a traveling warrior named Laike. Finding Alex's quest to become Dragonmaster humorous, Laike nonetheless wishes him and his friends luck as they leave the forest. Arriving at Saith, the group meets Nash, a magician-in-training from a prestigious magic school who needs transport back to his home, and joins the group on a boat to the eastern continent. Unlike the original Sega CD version, Luna continues with Alex rather than stay behind to give her a bigger role in the plot. After arriving in the port town of Meribia, Ramus leaves the group to become a salesman at his own shop, while the rest of the team travels to the floating city of Vane to meet Ghaleon, a former adventurer who traveled with Dyne before his death. Ghaleon sends Alex and Luna on a quest to stop a false Dragonmaster from harassing a village where he meets Jessica, a priestess and daughter of the legendary hero "Hell" Mel. Returning to Vane, Ghaleon tells Alex he wants to see Quark to discuss his future as Dragonmaster, with Luna joining them on a return trip to Burg. After arriving at the dragon cave, Ghaleon and Quark reminisce before Ghaleon cryptically asks whether Luna is "the one from back then". Upon hearing an affirmation, Ghaleon's mood changes, and suddenly transforms into a more sinister form, The Magic Emperor, who turns Quark to energy and kidnaps Luna, remarking that he will now use her in his quest to rule the world.

The game's final scenario and the reason for Ghaleon's actions differ slightly from the original, with the Goddess Althena's instability serving as the catalyst for the events rather than a rampaging Black Dragon. In this version, Laike relates the story of how one day fifteen years ago, the Goddess Althena concluded that people were depending too much on her, rather than growing as people and as a civilization, and that by continuing to mother them, she was doing more harm than good. Despite Ghaleon's pleas, Dyne and Althena used their powers to spread her life force throughout the world, transforming her into an infant, to live out a mortal life as a human. Ghaleon, believing humanity could not survive without a god watching over them, cut off all ties to his former friend and set his plan into motion to ascend to godhood himself in Althena's place; his cause set on rule rather than revenge as in the original. Believing that humanity was strong and resourceful enough to live on their own, Dyne left the young girl in the care of Alex's parents to raise her as their own daughter before he began his new life as Laike, a traveling adventurer. Now knowing the truth of Luna's origins, Alex and his friends travel to the Goddess tower to save her and stop Ghaleon from seizing control of the world. Defeating his generals, Alex confronts Ghaleon at the tower's upper pagoda, where the ritual to transfer Luna's power to him has already begun. Echoing Dyne's earlier declaration on the strength of humanity, Alex's team attacks and defeats Ghaleon as his fortress crumbles around them. With Luna still caught in a trance, Alex attempts to reason with her to leave while the others are teleported to safety. Playing his ocarina, Alex awakens Luna's memories before the two are transported to the surface as the tower collapses, re-uniting with their companions.

== Development ==
The remake initially began as Lunar: Silver Star Story, developed by a collaboration between Game Arts and Japan Art Media. Immediately after producing Lunar: Eternal Blue for the Sega CD console in 1994, much of the original staff expressed interest in remaking the first Lunar title on current, more advanced hardware. Displeased with many aspects of the original game's design, Game Arts sought to improve the original version to coincide with their initial vision of the project, including more sophisticated animation, better quality CD music, and a more engaging script. Silver Star Story was headed by producer Youichi Miyaji, who had previously worked on the first two Sega CD Lunar titles, who enlisted help from the staff of Japan Art Media to aid in the heavy-cost production of the game. While the original game contained roughly ten minutes of animation produced internally, the remake features fifty minutes of new, fully animated cut scenes by Studio Gonzo. For the game's first release on the Sega Saturn in October 1996, in-game movies could only display in quarter-screen and low fidelity due to the system's video limitations. This was corrected for the game's second release in July 1997 as Lunar: Silver Star Story Complete, with the introduction of the Saturn's MPEG card adapter, which allowed for full-screen playback at better quality. Both Saturn versions would be published by Kadokawa Shoten. In May 1998, Silver Star Story was ported to the PlayStation system in Japan by Alfa System. This version, while retaining all the extra features of the second Saturn release, including full-screen movies, was unable to produce the same high-fidelity playback as its video card-enhanced predecessor.

=== English version ===
The North American collector's edition package

In late 1995, California-based software company Working Designs, who had previously provided the translation for the original Silver Star, signed on to produce the English-language version. The company originally expressed interest in localizing the Saturn version under the name Lunar: Silver Star Story Director's Cut to be released in Fall 1996. When Fall 1996 arrived the localization was still in its early stages, and the release date was accordingly pushed back to the fourth quarter of 1997. Working Designs stated that its conflict with Sega of America would not impact the four Saturn projects from Working Designs which were already in progress, but though the other three all were released as promised, Lunar: Silver Star Story Complete was not. Work began on the PlayStation version in 1998. Silver Star Story Complete was headed by company president Victor Ireland, who also served as head translator and localizer. Like the original game, the English version features a lighthearted, non-literal interpretation of the original Japanese script while retaining the same basic story, which now includes American pop culture references, breaking the fourth wall, and slapstick humor. Working Designs kept in close contact with the original Japanese team, adding several new features to the North American version including DualShock controller support, the ability to switch between memory card slots on the save screen, and the ability to create up to fifteen save files instead of three. Working Designs initially announced that the PlayStation version would be released in North America in August 1998, just three months after the planned Japanese release. Programming and production difficulties stifled progress, resulting in numerous delays and changing release dates until the game's eventual release in May 1999. A stand-alone demo version of the game was distributed to several game stores across the United States which preceded the final version, as well as a Ghaleon punching puppet available with pre-order of Lunar 2 Eternal Blue.

Silver Star Story Complete was initially released in North America as a limited collector's edition which included two game discs, a hardbound instruction manual, a soundtrack CD, a "Making of Lunar: Silver Star Story Complete" special disc, and a cloth map of the Lunar world. The package retailed for $60.00 to cover the cost of the elaborate extras. Working Designs would also publish their own strategy guide for the game, also billed as a collector's item. Ireland's team would add an easter egg to the "Making of" video disc in the form of a minigame based on Atari's arcade game Warlords called Lords of Lunar accessed by using a code found in-game. In February 2002, a special "Fan-Art Edition" of the game was released featuring disc artwork by contributors to the Working Designs website, which lacked the extras of the collector's edition. A Windows-based PC version of Silver Star Story was released in Japan in December 1999 by DigiCube featuring higher resolution graphics and video playback. Working Designs had expressed interest in bringing this version to North America in 2002, but claimed that the English version was too buggy and unstable to be released.

== Audio ==
The music for Silver Star Story Complete consists of entirely new background themes by Noriyuki Iwadare. While Hiroshi Fujioka, Isao Mizoguchi, and Yoshiaki Kubodera collaborated with Iwadare on the Sega CD version, only Iwadare would return for the remake, composing nearly one hundred new songs. When creating the music for Silver Star Story Complete, Iwadare drew from his own experiences, admitting that he was trying to put a personal touch on his work and "express [myself] through [my] honest emotions". Music director Isao Mizoguchi claims that the music process was "a little different" from the companany's previous works, with the game's main themes being composed before they viewed the scenes that required them, making adjustments as they went along. Each song was divided into four categories: town or village, dungeon, battle, or field; each with their own pacing and emotional direction. Iwadare described the game's music as "very well received" according to fan feedback. The Japanese version features a new opening theme, "Tsu·Ba·Sa" (TSU・BA・SA, lit. Wings) performed by Kyōko Hikami. An intermediary song, "Kaze no Nocturne" (風のノクターン, Kaze no Nokutān; lit. Wind's Nocturne), also called "The Boat Song", was added to the game to heighten the emotion of Alex and Luna's departure into the world, which was kept at Mizoguchi's insistence even as material was being cut for time.

For the North American release, Victor Ireland had expressed interest in replacing many of the new themes with ones from the Sega CD version, including the original opening theme "Fighting Through the Darkness". After translating the game, however, Working Designs was left with very little extra space on each game disc, and the idea was abandoned. Many of the arranged songs meant for the English release were included on a special soundtrack packaged with the collector's edition. The English version features the opening theme, "Wings", performed by Jennifer Stigile, who also performs "Wind's Nocturne". Additionally, Working Designs' arrangements of classic Lunar: The Silver Star pieces were used to replace the new music in two animation sequences, "A Trinity of Terror" and "The Green Earth". It would later be used in the Korean version and the remastered version, albeit with Jackie Lastra as the vocalist in the latter. Furthermore, the iOS and Android versions featured "Wings 2009" and "Nocturne of Wind 2009" from Lunar: Silver Star Harmony, due to being the basis of that version, both performed by Hikami in Japanese and Stigile in English. However, only the English version is used, as the Japanese audio uses the original version.

=== Voice ===
Voice actors
Character	Japanese	English (Silver Star Complete)
Alex	Akira Ishida	Ashley Parker Angel
Luna	Kyōko Hikami	Rhonda Gibson
Nall	Junko Hagimori	Jackie Powers
Ramus	Yasuhiro Takato	Nancy Davis
Nash	Daisuke Sakaguchi	Leif Huckman
Mia Ausa	Yōko Asada	Jackie Powers
Jessica D'Alkirk	Haruna Ikezawa	Melissa Gulden
Kyle	Tomokazu Seki	John Haas
Quark	Yūsaku Yara	Hal Delahousse
Laike / Dyne	Akio Ōtsuka	Blake Dorsey
Mel D'Alkirk	Yūsaku Yara	Keith Lack
Lemia Ausa	Aya Hara	Dixie Garret
Ghaleon	Kiyoyuki Yanada	John Truitt
Royce	Machiko Toyoshima	Jennifer Stigile
Phacia	Sakura Tange	Paula Angel
Xenobia	Aya Hara	Katheryn Kirk
Tempest	Yasunori Masutani	Chad Letts
Fresca	Sakura Tange	Melissa Gulden
Myght	Yūsaku Yara	Dean Williams
Althena	Ai Maeda	N/A
Eiphel	Mitsuaki Madono	N/A
Five Princes of the Black Star: Fubau	Hiroshi Miyazaki	N/A
Five Princes of the Black Star: Ratone	Tomonori Sayama	N/A
Five Princes of the Black Star: Igarune	Keita Toide	N/A
Five Princes of the Black Star: Serrona Mashune	Natsuki Dai	N/A
Five Princes of the Black Star: Cicero	Yukihiro Matsumura	N/A

Silver Star Story Complete features twenty voiced characters, four times the original version. The characters' voices are used in pre-designated cut scenes, animated interludes and when using special attacks in battle. The English cast was composed of family and friends of the Working Designs staff, as well as local talent from the area. Ashley Angel, Jennifer Stigile, Rhonda Gibson, Jackie Powers, Hal Delahousse, and John Truitt reprise their roles, and were joined by a number of talents to fill out the game's expanded speaking roles. Working Designs had considered replacing Angel, as Victor Ireland felt he may have aged too much to convincingly play a young boy, but reconsidered after his rehearsal, commenting that "the players have all aged a bit since the original, so Alex could have aged a bit, too". Stigile sings the intro song as well as the "Boat Song" in the English version. While the English cast returned, the Japanese version was completely re-cast from the Sega CD original, bringing in several established anime and game voice actors, including pop idol Sakura Tange. A four-volume sound drama album series, Lunatic Festa, was released in Japan between August and November 1996 featuring the Japanese voice actors performing skits and songs in-character, as well as arranged music tracks from the game.

== Reception ==
Reception

Aggregate scores
Aggregator	Score
GameRankings	PS: 86%
Metacritic	PS: 78/100 iOS: 78/100

Review scores
Publication	Score
Electronic Gaming Monthly	9/10, 9.5/10, 8.5/10, 9/10
Famitsu	7/10, 5/10, 6/10, 7/10 (SS) 28/40 (PS)
Game Informer	7.75/10
GamePro	2.5/5
GameSpot	7.6/10
IGN	7.5/10
Next Generation	3/5
Official U.S. PlayStation Magazine	4.5/5
PlayStation: The Official Magazine	9/10
TouchArcade	4/5

The Saturn version of Silver Star Story was well received in Japan, with Weekly Sega Saturn Magazine recognizing it as one of the most memorable gaming experiences of 1997. It would go on to sell 200,035 copies in the region by the end of 1996, with the MPEG full-motion video version selling an additional 8,346 copies in 1997. The PlayStation version received a 7 out of 10 score from Hyper PlayStation magazine, remarking that although it contained lower quality visual effects and movie playback than the previous Saturn releases, it still remained a solid role-playing game. Silver Star Story's PlayStation version sold 44,802 copies in Japan, enough to qualify for Sony's PlayStation the Best distinction, and was subsequently re-released in Japan in April 1999 at a budget price.

Silver Star Story Complete sold over 223,000 units within its first year in North America, including the entire production run of the four-disc collector's edition. The game became the highest-selling Working Designs title to date, and the second highest-selling PlayStation role-playing game of 1999 behind Final Fantasy VIII. English reviews of the game were typically favorable, with critics such as Electronic Gaming Monthly remarking that Lunar's "plot, writing and voice acting are about the best you'll find", awarding the game an editor's choice gold award. The game's translation was equally applauded by PlayStation: The Official Magazine, calling it "spotless", and remarking that Working Designs' unique humor was applied to every bit of text in the game, including weapon descriptions. Official PlayStation Magazine remarked that "what little [Lunar] lacks in visual punch, it more than makes up for in style, story and wholly engrossing gameplay" calling attention to the game's programming and extra packaging.

The game's two-dimensional graphics were among its most panned feature, with GamePro commenting that the "flat battle areas, wimpy spells, and itty-bitty enemies will assault your eyes", citing the in-game animated cut scenes as the only saving grace. Game Informer conversely declared that the animated interludes were grainy and often would not display in true fullscreen, but remarked that it was "really a small gripe because Lunar has an entertaining story filled with enjoyable quips". Gamers' Republic recognized the inferiority of Lunar's graphics to current role-playing games, but nonetheless found them "charming". GameSpot simply described the graphics as "truly dated", adding that many of Lunar's aesthetic qualities could be re-created on a Super Nintendo. Technology magazine Silicon Mag called the game a "masterpiece", awarding it a 95% rating and declared it an asset to the game industry, calling it "a game that will sell systems, with gamers actually buying PlayStations just to play it". In 2000, Silver Star Story Complete ranked 22nd in IGN's list of top PlayStation games of all time, while in 2001 Electronic Gaming Monthly ranked it 75th on its list of the top 100 games of all time.

Next Generation reviewed the PlayStation version of the game, and stated that, "See, playing an upgraded Lunar now is a bit like getting to watch a digitally enhanced Thundercats with Dolby Surround: you're either going to think that's really cool, or you won't. If you do, then the entire package [...] will satisfy the most avid completists."

== Legacy ==
The game's engine and several design concepts, such as fully animated video interludes and collectible bromides, would later be used in the development of Magic School Lunar! in 1997 and Lunar 2: Eternal Blue Complete in 1998. Working Designs used the game's strong sales as justification to produce the English version of Eternal Blue Complete in North America, which also featured an elaborate collector's edition. A four-part Japanese novelization of Silver Star Story's events would later be written by Kei Shigema and published in 2001.

Silver Star Story Complete would be the first of three major revamps of the first Lunar game. In 2002, a new version of the game developed by Media Rings was released for the Game Boy Advance handheld system under the name Lunar Legend (ルナレジェンド, Runa Rejendo), with the title's English version being the first game in the series not published by Working Designs, but rather Ubisoft. Later in 2010, Lunar: Silver Star Harmony was released for PlayStation Portable, marking the last major revamp of the series.

On September 24, 2024, GungHo Online Entertainment announced that an enhanced version of the game and its sequel, Eternal Blue Complete, will be included in the Lunar Remastered Collection. Both titles are based on their PlayStation releases and add brand new English voice over, remastered visuals, and expanded options. It was released on Nintendo Switch, PlayStation 4, Windows, and Xbox One on April 18, 2025.
