= Lunar: Eternal Blue =

1994 video game

- North American Sega CD box art
- Developer: Game Arts (Note: Supervision by Studio Alex)
- Publishers: JP: Game Arts (Sega CD), Kadokawa Shoten (SS, PS1); NA: Working Designs
- Directors: Yōichi Miyaji; Hiroyuki Koyama
- Producers: Kazutoyo Ishii; Yōichi Miyaji
- Designer: Masayuki Shimada
- Programmers: Hiroyuki Koyama; Naozumi Honma; Masao Ishikawa
- Artists: Masatoshi Azumi; Toshio Akashi; Toshiyuki Kubooka
- Writers: Kei Shigema; Takashi Hino; Toshio Akashi
- Composer: Noriyuki Iwadare
- Series: Lunar
- Platforms: Sega CD, Sega Saturn, PlayStation
- Release: Sega CD: JP: December 22, 1994; NA: September 1995; Saturn: JP: July 23, 1998; PlayStation: JP: May 27, 1999; NA: December 15, 2000
- Genre: Role-playing
- Mode: Single-player

Lunar: Eternal Blue (Note: Japanese: LUNAR(ルナ) エターナルブルー, Hepburn: Runa: Etānaru Burū) is a 1994 role-playing video game developed by Game Arts in association with Studio Alex for the Sega CD as the sequel to Lunar: The Silver Star. The game was originally released in December 1994 in Japan, and later in North America in September 1995 by Working Designs. Eternal Blue expanded the story and gameplay of its predecessor, and made more use of the Sega CD's hardware, including more detailed graphics, longer, more elaborate animated cutscenes, and more extensive use of voice acting. Critics were mostly pleased with the title, giving particular merit to the game's English translation and further expansion of the role-playing game genre in CD format.

Set one thousand years after the events of The Silver Star, the game follows the adventure of Hiro, a young explorer and adventurer who meets Lucia, visitor from the far-away Blue Star, becoming entangled in her mission to stop Zophar, an evil, all-powerful being, from destroying the world. During their journey across the world of Lunar, Hiro and Lucia are joined by an ever-expanding cast of supporting characters, including some from its predecessor. Eternal Blue was remade in 1998 as Lunar 2: Eternal Blue Complete, published by Kadokawa Shoten for the Sega Saturn and PlayStation, with the latter version localized and published in North America by Working Designs. The PlayStation version was later re-released on PlayStation Network for PlayStation 3, PlayStation Portable, and PlayStation Vita in Japan in September 2015.

An enhanced version of Eternal Blue Complete is included alongside Silver Star Story Complete in the Lunar Remastered Collection, was released by GungHo Online Entertainment in April 2025 for Nintendo Switch, PlayStation 4, Windows, and Xbox One.

== Gameplay ==
Battle sequence screenshot

Lunar: Eternal Blue is a traditional role-playing video game featuring two-dimensional character sprites and backgrounds. The game is presented from a top-down perspective with players moving the characters across numerous fantasy environments while completing story-based scenarios and battling enemy monsters. Basic game function remains similar to Lunar: The Silver Star, with story segments being presented as both on-screen text and animated cutscenes. Players advance the story by taking part in quests and interacting with non-player characters, which engages them in the story as well as moves the narrative forward.

Battles in Eternal Blue occur randomly in dungeons and hostile areas. Players defeat enemies using standard attacks or magic, with combat ending when all enemies are defeated. Characters must move close to their target or use ranged attacks. The battle system, enhanced from The Silver Star, allows pre-positioning of characters and features improved AI. Characters gain experience points from battles, leveling up to face stronger foes. After combat, "magic points" are awarded to enhance magical attacks and unlock new skills. Progress can be saved to the Sega CD's internal RAM or a separate RAM cartridge, requiring magic experience points in the North American version.

== Plot ==
=== Characters ===
The characters of Lunar: Eternal Blue were designed by artist and Lunar veteran Toshiyuki Kubooka.

- Hiro – a young man and would-be explorer who is skilled with a sword and boomerangs
- Ruby – a pink, winged cat-like creature with a crush on Hiro who is a baby dragon like The Silver Star's Nall
- Gwyn – Hiro's adoptive grandfather, and an archaeologist
- Lucia – a mysterious and soft-spoken girl from the Blue Star who is skilled with magic and mostly naive of the world's customs
- Ronfar – a priest-turned-gambler with healing skills
- Lemina – money-grubbing heiress to the position of head of the world's highest magic guild
- Jean – a traveling dancer with a hidden past as a prisoner forced to use a deadly form of martial arts against innocent people
- Leo – captain of Althena's guard and servant of the goddess.

While the cast's primary personalities remained intact for the English release, some changes such as colorful language, jokes, and double entendres were added to their speech to make the game more comical.

Primary supporting characters include the servants of the Goddess Althena, the creator of Lunar thought to have vanished centuries ago who suddenly appeared in mortal form to lead her people.

- Borgan – an obese, self-absorbed magician with his eyes on the seat of power in the magic guild
- Lunn – a martial artist and Jean's former instructor
- Mauri – Leo's sister and Ronfar's love interest.
- Ghaleon (the primary villain killed in the previous game) - the current Dragonmaster, Althena's champion, and supposed protector of the world. His final end reveals that he regrets the evil he committed and does what he can to aid Hiro.
- Zophar – the game's principal villain, a long-dormant evil spirit who is attempting to destroy and recreate the world to his tastes. Although his voice is heard numerous times, he remains faceless until the final battle.

=== Story ===
On Lunar, Hiro and Ruby explore an ancient ruin and find a large gem called The Dragon's Eye. Removing it triggers a trap, causing the temple to collapse and monsters to chase them. On their return, they meet White Knight Leo, who warns of the "Destroyer," a prophesied being who will bring great calamity. Despite this, Hiro, Ruby, and Gwyn investigate a strange light at the Blue Spire tower. Using the Dragon's Eye, they enter the tower and meet Lucia, who needs to see goddess Althena to prevent disaster. The malevolent god-like being Zophar appears then drains Lucia's magic. The group seeks help from former-priest Ronfar to heal her, after which Lucia continues her quest alone.

Hiro, Ronfar, and Ruby follow Lucia and see her being abducted by Leo, who suspects her of being the Destroyer. They rescue her from Leo's ship, The Dragonship Destiny, and escape into a forest. There, they meet Jean, a dancer with a circus troupe, who helps them flee. Lucia struggles with human customs but begins to understand and appreciate humanity. Joined by Lemina, they journey across mountains and forests to reach Pentagulia, Althena's holy city.

Lucia demands to see Althena but dismisses the woman claiming to be her as an imposter. After a brief fight, the group is imprisoned. They are freed and joined by Leo, whose faith in the goddess has faltered. They decide to stop Ghaleon, the self-styled Dragonmaster supporting the false Althena, by restoring power to the four dragons. The heroes embark on a journey to free the dragons and confront Althena's strongest heroes, each facing and redeeming their troubled pasts.

The revived dragons, including Ruby, attack the false Althena's stronghold, where she transforms into a demonic monster. The group defeats her and learns the true Althena gave up her divinity for love. Lucia considers absorbing Althena's power to defeat Zophar but hesitates, fearing it could destroy all magic and Lunar. Zophar captures and drains Lucia's power; she uses her remaining magic to teleport Hiro and the others to safety. They train to fight Zophar, and Ghaleon appears, giving Hiro his sword and explaining his apparent villainy was a ruse to atone for past actions.

The group defeats Zophar, freeing Lucia and restoring peace. Lucia returns to the Blue Star, hoping to entrust it to humans based on her Lunar experience. Heartbroken by her departure, Hiro and the group later reunite to help him reach the Blue Star. Hiro succeeds, and he and Lucia look forward to a hopeful future for humanity.

== Development ==
Lunar: Eternal Blue was developed by Game Arts and Studio Alex, with project director Yoichi Miyagi returning to oversee the production of the new game. According to scenario writer Kei Shigema, the game's concept of an oppressive god came from the image of Sun Wukong, hero of the Chinese epic Journey to the West, being unable to escape from the gigantic palm of the Buddha. Shigema stated that "it was a picture showing the arrogance of a god who is saying, 'In the end, you pathetic humans are in my hands.' The moment I understood that, I thought, 'Oh, I definitely want to do this,' it'll definitely match perfectly. So we used it just like that." Eternal Blue took three years and over US$2.5 million to produce, and contains twice as much dialogue as its precessor. The game's development team originally wanted the game to be set only a few years after The Silver Star, and would feature slightly older versions of the previous cast along with the new characters, yet discarded the idea when they thought the new cast would lose focus. Like its predecessor, the game contains animated interludes to help tell the game's story, which were developed in-house with Toshiyuki Kubooka serving as animation director. While The Silver Star contained only ten minutes of partially voiced animation, Eternal Blue features nearly fifty minutes of fully voiced video content.

The game's North American version was translated and published by Working Designs, who had previously produced the English release of The Silver Star. Headed by company president Victor Ireland, the game's script contains the same light humor of the original, with references to American pop culture, word play, and breaking of the fourth wall not seen in the Japanese version. Working closely with the staff at Game Arts, Working Designs implemented design and balance fixes into the American release, including altering the difficulty of some battles that were found to be "near impossible". Finding little risk in the ability to save the game anywhere, Ireland's team added a "cost" component to the game's save feature, where players would have to spend points earned after battles to record their progress, remarking that "[We] wanted to make the player think about where and when to save without making it too burdensome." In addition, Working Designs implemented the ability for the game to remember the last action selected by the player during combat, allowing them to use the same command the next round without having to manually select it. Like The Silver Star, the North American version of Eternal Blue featured an embossed instruction manual cover.

== Audio ==
The soundtrack for Lunar: Eternal Blue was composed by Noriyuki Iwadare, who had previously co-produced the music for Lunar: The Silver Star. The game utilizes studio-quality Red Book audio for one of the two vocal songs. (Both are CD tracks in the US version.) Every other piece of music was encoded into 16 kHz PCM files. Dialogue and certain ambient effects also used the PCM format. Most sound effects were generated through the Sega Genesis sound processor. Along with music director Isao Mizoguchi, Iwadare's goal was to produce music that contained "a high degree of originality" when compared to both the previous game and role-playing games in general. While the original game's music represented a number of styles and genres, Iwadare purposefully narrowed his range of composition to give the songs a unified feel. The English version contains an original title not found in the Japanese release, named the "Star Dragon Theme". It was used as the BGM for the Star Tower dungeon. The game's ending theme, "Eternal Blue ~Thoughts of Eternity~", also known in English as "Lucia's Theme", performed by Chisa Yokoyama in Japanese and Jennifer Stigile in English, is one of Iwadare's favorite compositions. An official soundtrack featuring selected tracks from the game was released in Japan on February 22, 1995, by Toshiba-EMI Records.

=== Voice ===
Voice actors
Character	Japanese	English
Hiro	Hikaru Midorikawa	Mark Zempel
Lucia	Chisa Yokoyama	Kelly Weaver
Ruby	Kumiko Nishihara	Jennifer Stigile
Ronfar	Ryōtarō Okiayu	Ned Schuft
Jean	Aya Hisakawa	Jennifer Stigile
Lemina	Megumi Hayashibara	Kathy Emme
Leo	Shinichiro Ohta	Ty Webb
Lunn	Masaharu Satō	Blake Dorsey
Borgan	Daisuke Gōri	Dean Williams
Mauri	Kumiko Watanabe	Emmunah Hauser
Nall	Rica Matsumoto	Johnathon Esses
Althena	Shiho Niiyama	Katie Staeck
Ghaleon	Rokurō Naya	John Truitt
Zophar	Iemasa Kayumi	T. Owen Smith

Lunar: Eternal Blue features spoken dialogue during cutscenes and specific points in the game's script. While The Silver Star contained only fifteen minutes of voiced content, Eternal Blue features over an hour and a half of pre-recorded speech. The game's cast consists of fifteen voiced roles, with the original Japanese version featuring veteran anime and video game actors, including Rokurō Naya returning as Ghaleon. For the game's English version, Working Designs hired friends and staff of the game's production crew, many of whom had worked on previous projects with the company. John Truitt also reprises his role as Ghaleon, and is joined by a number of new cast members to the Lunar series, many of which would return in future games.

The Japanese release of Eternal Blue was preceded by a spoken drama album called Lunar: Eternal Blue Prelude in June 1994 featuring the game's future voice cast performing skits and songs in-character to promote the game. When the game was released the following December, it was packaged with an 8 cm music disc called the Lunar: Eternal Blue Premium CD featuring short conversations by Lucia and Lemina, as well as in-character theme songs. In the months following the game's release, a two-volume drama album set featuring an expanded cast titled Lunatic Parade would be released by Toshiba-EMI records in June and September 1995.

== Reception ==
Reception

Aggregate score
Aggregator	Score
GameRankings	91% (7 reviews)

Review scores
Publication	Score
Electronic Gaming Monthly	31/40
Famitsu	24/40
Game Informer	8.75/10
GameFan	91%
Next Generation	4/5
RPGFan	99%
Game Players	81%
Games Are Fun	10/10
Sega-16	9/10

Lunar: Eternal Blue sold well in Japan despite an estimated retail price of JPY¥9,900, nearly the equivalent of US$100 in 1994. The game would go on to sell fewer copies than its predecessor, Lunar: The Silver Star, yet still became the second-highest selling Sega-CD game in Japan and third highest selling worldwide. Eternal Blue received a score of 30 out of 40 in Japanese magazine Megadrive Beep!, with fellow Sega publication Megadrive Fan calling the game "fun" and featuring an official manga strip written by scenario writer Kei Shigema over the next several months.

The game experienced relatively low sales during its release in North America, which Victor Ireland attributed to both the rise of 32-bit game consoles such as the Sega Saturn and PlayStation, and widespread media declaration of the Sega-CD's "death" in the video game market in 1995. Its English release met with a favorable response, with GamePro remarking that "Eternal Blue could appear to some as 'just another RPG,' but the epic scope, appealing characters, and excellent cinematics make it much more," yet found the game's linear story progression to be its low point. Electronic Gaming Monthly praised the game's "great story and witty characters", adding that "the all-important, usually absent ingredient is there: fun". They awarded it as the Best Sega Mega-CD Game of 1995. In their review, Game Players found the game's larger scope and expanded features made it less enjoyable than its predecessor, saying "it's a better game, it's just not quite as much fun. [We] still liked it, a lot, and it's definitely recommended, but it feels like something's been lost." Next Generation Magazine echoed this sentiment, remarking that "overall it's a much stronger game, but you can't help feeling something missing", yet maintained that the game's storyline was "decidedly less goofy, with more of an emphasis on drama and storyline."

When asked if he approved of the game's reviews, Ireland replied that they were "overall in the ballpark" from what he expected, with the exception of a portion of a review from GameFan. In an earlier preview of the English version, editors of GameFan called the game's translation "ingeniously written", which was quoted in an Eternal Blue print advertisement that appeared in several magazines up to the game's release. When the editors reviewed the final version, however, they questioned the game's frequent use of jokes and lewd quips in place of the original Japanese narrative which Ireland described as "a complete about-face". Despite their problems with portions of the translation, the magazine would still regard the majority of the game's "non-joke-laden" script as "excellent", and awarded the game a 91% rating, calling it "one of the greatest epics ever programmed".

In 1997 Electronic Gaming Monthly ranked Lunar: Eternal Blue the 40th best console video game of all time, remarking that "Despite some gamers' claims of the dialogue being a bit too witty in Lunar 2, the game itself is fantastic. The story is compelling, the music is great and the voice acting and animation are all top-notch." Retro Gamer included Eternal Blue among top ten Mega CD games.

== Remake ==
In July 1998, Game Arts released a remake to Eternal Blue, Lunar 2: Eternal Blue Complete for the Sega Saturn, with a PlayStation version available the following year. Like the remake of The Silver Star, Lunar: Silver Star Story Complete, the new version of Eternal Blue features updated graphics, re-arranged audio, and more robust animated sequences by Studio Gonzo, as well as an expanded script. This version would be released in North America in 2000 once again by Working Designs in the form of an elaborate collector's edition package that includes a soundtrack CD, "making of" bonus disc, game map, and a special omake box complete with Eternal Blue collectibles.

=== Reception ===
Reception

Aggregate score
Aggregator	Score	
Aggregator	PS	Saturn
Metacritic	86/100 (12 reviews)	

Review scores
Publication	Score	
Publication	PS	Saturn
Consoles +		89%
GamePro	4.5/5	
GameSpot	7.3/10	
IGN	8/10	
Next Generation	3/5	
RPGamer	9/10	
RPGFan	98%	91%
Absolute PlayStation	91%	
Game Vortex	95%	
Sega Saturn Magazine		26/30

Award
Publication	Award
RPGFan (RPG Awards)	Overall Best RPG (1998)

The remake received positive reviews upon release. GamePro said it "may not be the flashiest RPG of the year, but it's definitely one of the best, with its solid combination of terrific gameplay and a compelling story."

Samuel Bass reviewed the PlayStation version for Next Generation, stating that it is "not one for the technologically fixated, but a brilliant, timelessly charming RPG nonetheless".
