= Working Designs =

American video game publisher

- Company type: Defunct
- Industry: Video games
- Founded: 1986
- Defunct: 2005
- Successor: Gaijinworks
- Headquarters: 18135 Clear Creek Road, Redding, CA 96001
- Key people: Victor Ireland, Todd Mark, Sylvia Schmitt
- Website: http://www.workingdesigns.com/

Working Designs was an American video game publisher that specialized in the localization of Japanese role-playing video games, strategy video games and top-down shooters for various platforms. Though the company had published many cult hits, it was known best to fans as the long-time exclusive North American publisher of the Lunar series. The company was one of the few game publishers that attempted to bridge the cultural gap between the Japanese and American video game industries during the 1990s with an eclectic selection of releases from various genres, and was also one of the earliest American publishers to make use of the CD-ROM format for full, spoken English dialogue in its titles at a time when voice acting was not a common feature in most mainstream games.

On December 12, 2005, Victor Ireland, President of Working Designs, announced via the company's message board that it was closing its doors. He later started a new company called Gaijinworks in 2006.

== History ==
Working Designs was initially founded as a software company focusing on logging management software for the IBM PC. After lead programmer Todd Mark's death in 1988, Victor Ireland was hired to complete Mark's unfinished work before transitioning the company to a game publisher in 1990.

Working Designs published games for the Sega CD and TurboGrafx-CD due to the appeal of the CD medium, instead of the more popular cartridge-based Super Nintendo Entertainment System and Sega Genesis. The company released some of its games with premium packaging for higher prices. They applied foil stamps and extensive artwork to its packaging and supplied games with full color manuals with anime artwork and concept art at a time when many game manuals for Western releases were in greyscale. Also, every manual came with notes describing the translation process and procedure of its games, usually found on the last page of the manual. Every edition of these notes closed with the signature phrase, "We're nothing without you!"

Working Designs became known for its incorporating quirky, distinctively American humor in its translations. President Victor Ireland maintained that the company has always adhered as closely to the original Japanese text as it could while making it understandable to U.S. audiences, and said the addition of American-style humor was necessary to replace Japanese jokes which most Americans would not be able to understand.

When the Sony PlayStation and Sega Saturn were released, Working Designs met with Sony Computer Entertainment America (SCEA, whose president at the time was Bernie Stolar). SCEA said it had no interest in seeing non-action games released for the PlayStation, and as Working Designs published mainly strategy games and RPGs, this led it to begin publishing exclusively for the Sega Saturn. Working Designs had also built a strong working relationship with Sega by this time.

The final Sega Saturn game released in the US, Magic Knight Rayearth, was delayed for over two years. Following Stolar's departure from Sony, Working Designs began working on games for the PlayStation, for which they released the most single titles on a console (10 titles) in their history, and continued to branch out by introducing their "Spaz" label of arcade-style shoot 'em ups. Following E3 1997, where Ireland complained that Sega of America assigned it an out-of-the-way booth and was giving away information about the upcoming Dreamcast console to the detriment of the Saturn market, Working Designs announced it would publish no more Saturn games beyond the four that were then in progress.

Due to a series of delays, approval snags, and sagging sales, Working Designs announced on December 12, 2005 that all existing staff had been laid off and the company was effectively defunct. In a public statement posted on the message board hosted at Working Designs' official site, President Victor Ireland, though expressing much gratitude for strong core fan support over the years, stated that a series of complications related to the approval of upcoming games for the PlayStation 2 had created a loss of revenue from which the company would not be able to recover.

== List of Published/Handled Working Designs Games ==
| Title | Release date | System | Produced/Developed by |
|---|---|---|---|
| Parasol Stars | October 1991 | TurboGrafx-16 | Taito |
| Cadash | November 1991 | TurboGrafx-16 | Taito |
| Cosmic Fantasy 2 | June 1992 | TurboGrafx-CD | Telenet Japan |
| Exile | October 1992 | TurboGrafx-CD | Telenet Japan |
| Vasteel | April 1993 | TurboGrafx-CD | Human Entertainment |
| Exile: Wicked Phenomenon | June 1993 | TurboGrafx-CD | Telenet Japan |
| Dungeon Explorer II (English-Dub Only) | October 1993 | TurboGrafx-CD | Hudson Soft |
| Lunar: The Silver Star | December 1993 | Sega CD | Game Arts |
| Vay | July 1994 | Sega CD | SIMS, Hertz |
| Popful Mail | February 23, 1995 | Sega CD | Sega, Sega Falcom |
| Lunar: Eternal Blue | September 1995 | Sega CD | Game Arts |
| Iron Storm | May 8, 1996 | Sega Saturn | Sega |
| Shining Wisdom | June 27, 1996 | Sega Saturn | Sega, Sonic! Software Planning |
| RayStorm | October 1996 | PlayStation | Taito |
| Dragon Force | November 1996 | Sega Saturn | Sega, J-Force |
| Albert Odyssey: Legend of Eldean | July 23, 1997 | Sega Saturn | Sunsoft |
| Sega Ages Volume 1 | November 7, 1997 | Sega Saturn | Sega |
| Alundra | January 7, 1998 | PlayStation | SCEI, Matrix Software |
| Elemental Gearbolt | August 7, 1998 | PlayStation | SCEI, Alfa System |
| Thunder Force V | November 13, 1998 | PlayStation | Technosoft |
| Magic Knight Rayearth | December 11, 1998 | Sega Saturn | Sega |
| Lunar: Silver Star Story Complete | May 28, 1999 | PlayStation | Game Arts |
| Silhouette Mirage | January 25, 2000 | PlayStation | Treasure |
| Vanguard Bandits | June 28, 2000 | PlayStation | Human Entertainment |
| RayCrisis | October 25, 2000 | PlayStation | Taito |
| Gungriffon Blaze | October 26, 2000 | PlayStation 2 | Game Arts |
| Lunar 2: Eternal Blue Complete | December 15, 2000 | PlayStation | Game Arts |
| Silpheed: The Lost Planet | April 10, 2001 | PlayStation 2 | Game Arts, Treasure |
| Arc the Lad Collection | April 18, 2002 | PlayStation | SCEI, ARC Entertainment |
| Growlanser II/Growlanser III (As Growlanser Generations) | December 7, 2004 | PlayStation 2 | Atlus, Career Soft |
