= List of massively multiplayer online first-person shooter games =

This is a selected list of massively multiplayer online first-person shooter games. MMOFPSs are large multi-user games that take place in perpetual online worlds with hundreds or thousands of other players.

== List of notable MMOFPSs ==
Title	Status	Subscription Model	Release date	Close Date	Notes
Dust 514	Ended	Free-to-play	May 14, 2013	May 30, 2016	
Face of Mankind	Ended	Free-to-play/Subscription	August 31, 2006	September 3, 2015	Went through various names, financial models, and publishers during its nine-year existence
Firefall	Ended	Free-to-play	September 2, 2011	July 7, 2017	
Global Agenda	Released	Free-to-play	February 1, 2010		A hybrid between a multiplayer, hub-based shooter and a larger-scale persistent world online shooter (MMO).
Hellgate: London	Ended	Free-to-play	October 31, 2007	January 31, 2009	"The game can be played in either third person perspective or first person perspective." "Hellgate: London can be played offline or online without a fee."
Huxley	Ended		May 3, 2010	December 30, 2010	
MAG	Ended	Free-to-play	January 26, 2010	January 28, 2014	
Neocron	Released	Subscription/Free-to-play (June 2011)	September 9, 2002		MMO with RPG and FPS elements.
PlanetSide	Ended	Subscription	May 20, 2003	July 1, 2016	Launched with a subscription-based pay model. Went free-to-play on April 29, 2014 until server shutdown.
PlanetSide Arena	Ended	Free-to-play	September 19, 2019	January 10, 2020	Free-to-play spinoff of PlanetSide 2 featuring game modes like capture the flag and battle royale. Shut down due to low player counts.
PlanetSide 2	Released	Free-to-play	November 20, 2012		On January 23, 2015, PlanetSide 2 set the record for the most players online in a single FPS battle.
Tabula Rasa	Ended	Subscription	November 2, 2007	February 28, 2009	"It still was not an outright shooter and featured sticky targeting and dice rolling based on character stats underneath."
World War II Online	Released	Free-to-play	June 6, 2001		Game is still online and playable, although the player base has significantly dwindled. The game is still providing content updates and developers are pushing towards a core engine update utilising Unreal (As at March 2022).
Pioner	Released	Buy-to-play	December 16, 2025		As an MMO FPS, it offers both PvE missions and intense PvP zones, with unique crafting mechanics, hundreds of weapons and a deep story to explore.

== Business models ==
MMOFPSs today use a wide range of business models, from completely free of charge (no strings attached) or advertise funded to various kinds of payment plans. This list uses the following terms.

- Free-to-play (F2P) means that there might be a cost to purchase the software but there is no subscription charge or added payments needed to access game content.
- Pay-to-play means that players must pay, usually by monthly subscription, in order to play the game.
- Freemium means that the majority of game content is available for free but players can pay for extra content or added perks.

== See also ==
- Online game
- Lists of video games
