= Video games listed among the best first-person shooters =

Video games notable for positive reception

Publications have listed at least 156 video games as some of the best first-person shooters (FPS), a subgenre of shooter games that mixes together a first-person perspective with a user-friendly shooting interface. The genre's household franchises include Call of Duty, Doom, and Halo. FPS evolved from its 1990s origins of shareware files on a bulletin board system to become the all-time biggest video game genre.

As introductory prose of editor-ran features puts it, FPS is the one genre that has maintained its popularity for every console generation it has been around, surviving allegations of causing real-life violence. Its entries are some of the highest-selling video games year-after-year, with a mass audience extending to casual gamers, and the video games industry's multi-billion-dollar success was attributed by GameSpot to them.

The reason for the genre's popularity is theorized to be providing players the opportunity to be a "badass" in action film-esque scenarios. As LaptopMag explained, "the best first-person shooters offer exhilarating escapism that puts awesomeness at the forefront. Getting caught in intense gunfights, balancing every last piece of ammunition, skillfully running or jumping around the arena as an onslaught of bullets rush towards you, and precisely popping the heads of every demon or monster you're facing off against is the textbook definition of a good time."

Generally, the methodology of best-of FPS lists measure not only enjoyment but lasting influence, innovation, and historical importance. GameSpot explained the highest-quality FPS contain one or more of the following: "cohesive story", "well-designed campaign", "clever" enemy artificial intelligence, weapons, and a "creative multiplayer mode".

The genre is a foundation for games that also experiment with elements such as worldbuilding and storytelling, resulting in variety. Some FPS heavily incorporate other aspects that exceed or are as prevalent as the FPS core, such as other genres like role-playing video games, an emphasis on choice-making, and political subject matter. While most lists allow for virtually any FPS game, GameSpot's 2004 top-ten list was limited to action titles that were "true first-persons shooters", disqualifying games like System Shock 2 (1999) or Deus Ex (2000) that were closer to other genres such as role-playing games.

Multiplayer is also a defining factor in the quality of several FPS considered the best, such as Goldeneye 007 (1997) and Overwatch (2016). As LaptopMag put it, "There are also those days when you just want the satisfaction of battling other players in palpitating PvP action." This multiplayer aspect also results in several FPS becoming Esports staples. GameSpot's 2004 list noted how FPS without a multiplayer mode tend to lack longevity.

== List ==
FPS listed as the best
Year	Game	Developer	Publisher	Original platform(s) (Note: "PC" includes Microsoft's line of MS-DOS and Windows operating systems)	Ref.
1992	Wolfenstein 3D	id Software	Apogee Software	PC	
1993	Blake Stone: Aliens of Gold	JAM Productions	Apogee Software	PC, Mac, Linux, Amiga	
1993	Doom	id Software		PC	(Note: Doom (1993):)
1994	Doom II	id Software		PC	
1994	Marathon	Bungie		Mac	
1994	Rise of the Triad	Apogee Software		PC	
1994	System Shock	LookingGlass Technologies	Origin Systems	PC, Mac	
1994	Virtua Cop	Sega		Arcade, Sega Saturn	
1995	Hexen: Beyond Heretic	Raven Software	id Software	PC	
1995	Star Wars: Dark Forces	LucasArts		PC, Mac	
1995	Time Crisis	Namco		Arcade, PlayStation	
1996	Duke Nukem 3D	3D Realms	FormGen	PC	(Note: Duke Nukem 3D:)
1996	Marathon Infinity	Bungie		Mac	
1996	Quake	id Software	GT Interactive	PC	(Note: Quake:)
1997	Goldeneye 007	Rare	Nintendo	Nintendo 64	(Note: Goldeneye 007:)
1997	Outlaws	LucasArts		PC	
1997	Quake II	id Software	Activision	PC	
1997	Star Wars Jedi Knight: Dark Forces II	LucasArts		PC	
1998	Half-Life	Valve	Sierra Studios	PC, PlayStation 2	(Note: Half-Life:)
1998	Starsiege: Tribes	Dynamix	Sierra On-Line	PC	
1998	Tom Clancy's Rainbow Six	Red Storm Entertainment		PC	
1998	Turok 2: Seeds of Evil	Acclaim Entertainment		Nintendo 64, PC	
1999	Descent 3	Outrage Entertainment	Interplay Entertainment	PC, Mac, Linux	
1999	Quake III Arena	id Software	Activision	PC	(Note: Quake III Arena:)
1999	System Shock 2	Irrational Games	Electronic Arts	PC	
1999	Team Fortress Classic	Valve	Sierra Studios	PC	
1999	Unreal Tournament	Epic Games	GT Interactive	PC	(Note: Unreal Tournament:)
2000	Counter-Strike	Valve	Sierra Studios	PC	(Note: Counter-Strike: IGN's spot was for version 1.6 specifically.)
2000	Deus Ex	Ion Storm	Eidos Interactive	PC, PlayStation 2	(Note: Deus Ex:)
2000	The Operative: No One Lives Forever	Monolith Productions	Fox Interactive	PC	
2000	Perfect Dark	Rare		Nintendo 64	(Note: Perfect Dark:)
2000	Silent Scope	Konami		Arcade, PlayStation 2, Dreamcast	
2001	Halo: Combat Evolved	Bungie	Microsoft Game Studios	Xbox	(Note: Halo: Combat Evolved:)
2001	Red Faction	Volition	THQ	PlayStation 2	
2001	Serious Sam: The First Encounter	Croteam	Gathering of Developers	PC	
2001	Tom Clancy's Ghost Recon	Red Storm Entertainment	Ubi Soft	PC, Mac, Xbox, PlayStation 2, GameCube	
2002	Battlefield 1942	Digital Illusions CE	Electronic Arts	PC	
2002	Medal of Honor: Allied Assault	2015	Electronic Arts	PC, Mac	
2002	Medal of Honor: Frontline	Electronic Arts		PlayStation 2, GameCube, Xbox	
2002	Metroid Prime	Retro Studios	Nintendo	GameCube	(Note: Metroid Prime: Remastered:)
2002	TimeSplitters 2	Free Radical Design	Eidos Interactive	PlayStation 2, Xbox, GameCube	(Note: TimeSplitters 2:)
2003	Call of Duty	Infinity Ward	Activision	PC	(Note: Call of Duty:)
2004	The Chronicles of Riddick: Escape From Butcher Bay	Starbreeze Studios	Vivendi Universal Games	Xbox	
2004	Far Cry	Crytek	Ubisoft	PC	
2004	Half-Life 2	Valve		PC	(Note: Half-Life 2:)
2004	Halo 2	Bungie	Microsoft Game Studios	Xbox 360	
2005	Battlefield 2	Digital Illusions CE	Electronic Arts	PC	
2005	Black	Criterion Games	Electronic Arts	PlayStation 2, Xbox	
2005	Brothers in Arms: Road to Hill 30	Gearbox Software	Ubisoft	PC, Xbox, PlayStation 2	
2005	F.E.A.R.	Monolith Productions	Vivendi Universal Games	PC	
2005	Killer7	Capcom		GameCube, PlayStation 2	
2005	Star Wars: Battlefront II	Pandemic Studios	LucasArts	PC, PlayStation 2, PlayStation Portable, Xbox	
2005	SWAT 4	Irrational Games	Sierra Entertainment	PC	
2005	TimeSplitters: Future Perfect	Free Radical Design	Electronic Arts	GameCube, PlayStation 2, Xbox	
2006	Resistance: Fall of Man	Insomniac Games	Sony Computer Entertainment	PlayStation 3	
2006	Tom Clancy's Ghost Recon Advanced Warfighter	Ubisoft		PC, Xbox 360, Xbox, PlayStation 2	
2006	Tom Clancy's Rainbow Six: Vegas	Ubisoft		PC, Xbox 360	
2007	BioShock	2K		PC, Xbox 360, PlayStation 3	(Note: Bioshock:)
2007	Call of Duty 4: Modern Warfare	Infinity Ward	Activision	PC, Xbox 360, PlayStation 3	(Note: Call of Duty 4: Modern Warfare:)
2007	Crysis	Crytek	Electronic Arts	PC	
2007	The Darkness	Starbreeze Studios	2K	Xbox 360, PlayStation 3	
2007	Halo 3	Bungie	Microsoft Game Studios	Xbox 360	(Note: Halo 3:)
2007	Portal	Valve		PC, Xbox 360, PlayStation 3	
2007	S.T.A.L.K.E.R.: Shadow of Chernobyl	GSC Game World		PC	
2007	Team Fortress 2	Valve		PC, Xbox 360, PlayStation 3	(Note: Team Fortress 2:)
2008	Fallout 3	Bethesda Softworks		PC, Xbox 360, PlayStation 3	
2008	Far Cry 2	Ubisoft		PC, Xbox 360, PlayStation 3	
2008	Left 4 Dead	Valve		PC, Xbox 360	(Note: Left 4 Dead:)
2008	Mirror's Edge	DICE	Electronic Arts	PC, PlayStation 3, Xbox 360	
2008	Tom Clancy's Rainbow Six: Vegas 2	Ubisoft		PC, Xbox 360, PlayStation 3	
2009	Arma 2	Bohemia Interactive		PC	
2009	Borderlands	Gearbox Software	2K	PC, Xbox 360, PlayStation 3	
2009	Call of Duty: Modern Warfare 2	Infinity Ward	Activision	PC, Xbox 360, PlayStation 3	
2009	Left 4 Dead 2	Valve		PC, Xbox 360	(Note: Left 4 Dead 2:)
2010	Battlefield: Bad Company 2	DICE	Electronic Arts	PC, PlayStation 3, Xbox 360, iOS, Android, Kindle Fire	
2010	Bioshock 2	2K		PC, Xbox 360, PlayStation 3	
2010	Call of Duty: Black Ops	Treyarch	Activision	PlayStation 3, PC, Nintendo DS, Wii, Xbox 360	
2010	MAG	Zipper Interactive	Sony Computer Entertainment	PlayStation 3	
2010	Metro 2033	4A Games	THQ	PC, Xbox 360	(Note: Metro 2033:, Redux:)
2011	Battlefield 3	DICE	Electronic Arts	PC, Xbox 360, PlayStation 3	
2011	Bulletstorm	Epic Games	Electronic Arts	PC, Xbox 360, PlayStation 3	(Note: Full Clip Edition:)
2011	Deus Ex: Human Revolution	Eidos-Montréal	Square Enix	PC, Xbox 360, PlayStation 3	
2011	Portal 2	Valve		PC, Mac	
2012	Borderlands 2	Gearbox Software	2K	PC, Xbox 360, PlayStation 3, Mac	(Note: Borderlands 2:)
2012	Counter-Strike: Global Offensive	Valve		Mac, PC, PlayStation 3, Xbox 360	
2012	Dishonored	Arkane Studios	Bethesda Softworks	PC, Xbox 360, PlayStation 3	(Note: Dishonored:)
2012	Far Cry 3	Ubisoft		PC, Xbox 360, PlayStation 3	
2012	Halo 4	343 Industries	Microsoft Studios	Xbox 360	
2012	Planetside 2	Toadman Interactive	Sony Online Entertainment	PC	
2012	ZombiU	Ubisoft		Wii U	
2013	Bioshock Infinite	Irrational Games	2K	PlayStation 3, PC, Xbox 360	
2013	Call of Juarez: Gunslinger	Techland	Ubisoft	PC, PlayStation 3, Xbox 360	
2013	Metro: Last Light	4A Games	Deep Silver	PC, PlayStation 3, Xbox 360	(Note: Metro: Last Light: Redux:)
2013	Payday 2	Overkill Software	505 Games	PlayStation 3, PC, Xbox 360	
2014	Alien: Isolation	Creative Assembly	Sega	PlayStation 3, PlayStation 4, PC, Xbox 360, Xbox One	
2014	Destiny	Bungie	Activision	PlayStation 3, PC, Xbox 360	
2014	Far Cry 4	Ubisoft		PC, PlayStation 3, PlayStation 4, Xbox 360, Xbox One	
2014	Firefall	Red 5 Studios		PC	
2014	Halo: The Master Chief Collection	343 Industries	Xbox Game Studios	Xbox One	(Note: Halo: The Master Chief Collection:)
2014	Insurgency	New World Interactive		PC, Mac, Linux	
2014	Titanfall	Respawn Entertainment	Electronic Arts	PC, Xbox One	
2014	Wolfenstein: The New Order	MachineGames	Bethesda Softworks	PlayStation 3, PlayStation 4, PC, Xbox 360, Xbox One	(Note: Wolfenstein: The New Order:)
2015	Dying Light	Techland	Warner Bros. Interactive Entertainment	PC, Linux, PlayStation 4, Xbox One	
2015	Tom Clancy's Rainbow Six Siege	Ubisoft		PC, PlayStation 4, Xbox One	(Note: Tom Clancy's Rainbow Six Siege:)
2016	Battlefield 1	DICE	Electronic Arts	PC, PlayStation 4, Xbox One	
2016	Doom	id Software	Bethesda Softworks	PC, PlayStation 4, Xbox One	(Note: Doom (2016):)
2016	Killing Floor 2	Tripwire Interactive		PC, PlayStation 4, Xbox One	
2016	Overwatch	Bizarre Entertainment		PC, PlayStation 4, Xbox One	
2016	Superhot	Superhot Team		PC, Mac, Linux	(Note: Superhot:)
2016	Titanfall 2	Respawn Entertainment	Electronic Arts	PlayStation 4, PC, Xbox One	(Note: Titanfall 2:)
2017	Destiny 2	Bungie	Activision	PlayStation 4, Xbox One, PC	(Note: Destiny 2:)
2017	Escape from Tarkov (Note: Official version released in 2025, with its beta first released in 2017.)	Battlestate Games		PC	
2017	Prey	Arkane Studios	Bethesda Softworks	PC, PlayStation 4, Xbox One	
2017	PUBG: Battlegrounds	PUBG Studios	Krafton	PC	
2017	Wolfenstein II: The New Colossus	MachineGames	Bethesda Softworks	PC, PlayStation 4, Xbox One	(Note: Wolfenstein II: The New Colossus:)
2018	Deep Rock Galactic (Note: Deep Rock Galactic's official release was in 2020, as 2018 was its early access date.)	Ghost Ship Games	Coffee Stain Publishing	PC	
2018	Dusk	David Szymanski	New Blood Interactive	PC	(Note: Dusk:)
2019	Apex Legends	Respawn Entertainment	Electronic Arts	PC, PlayStation 4, Xbox One	(Note: Apex Legends:)
2019	Hunt: Showdown 1896	Crytek		PC, Xbox One, PlayStation 4	(Note: Hunt: Showdown 1896:)
2019	Metro Exodus	4A Games	Deep Silver	PC, PlayStation 4, Xbox One	(Note: Metro Exodus:)
2019	Splitgate (Note: 2022 was Splitgate's official release year, as 2019 was its early access year.)	1047 Games		PC	
2020	Black Mesa	Crowbar Interactive		PC, Linux	(Note: Black Mesa:)
2020	Call of Duty: Warzone	Raven Software	Activision	PC, Xbox One, PlayStation 4	
2020	Cyberpunk 2077	CD Projekt		PC, PlayStation 4, Stadia, Xbox One	
2020	Doom Eternal	id Software	Bethesda Softworks	PC, PlayStation 4, Stadia. Xbox One	(Note: Doom Eternal:)
2020	Ghostrunner	One More Level	505 Games	PC, PlayStation 4, Xbox One, Nintendo Switch	
2020	Half-Life: Alyx	Valve		PC, Linux	
2020	Ultrakill	Hakita	New Blood Interactive	PC	
2020	Valorant	Riot Games		PC	(Note: Valorant:)
2021	Back 4 Blood	Turtle Rock Studios	Warner Bros. Games	PlayStation 4, PlayStation 5, PC, Xbox One, Xbox Series X/S	
2021	Deathloop	Arkane Lyon	Bethesda Softworks	PC, PlayStation 5, Xbox Series X/S	(Note: Deathloop:)
2021	Far Cry 6	Ubisoft		PlayStation 4, PlayStation 5, Stadia, PC, Xbox One, Xbox Series X/S	
2021	Halo Infinite	343 Industries	Xbox Game Studios	PC, Xbox One, Xbox Series X/S	
2021	Resident Evil Village	Capcom		PlayStation 4, PlayStation 5, Stadia, PC, Xbox One, Xbox Series X/S	
2022	Call of Duty: Modern Warfare 2	Infinity Ward	Activision	PlayStation 4, PlayStation 5, PC, Xbox One, Xbox Series X/S	
2022	Call of Duty: Warzone 2.0	Infinity Ward	Activision	PC, PlayStation 4, PlayStation 5, Xbox One, Xbox Series X/S	
2022	Metal: Hellsinger	The Outsiders	Funcom	PC, PlayStation 5, Xbox Series X/S, PlayStation 4, Xbox One	
2022	Neon White	Angel Matrix	Annapruna Interactive	PC, Nintendo Switch, PlayStation 4, PlayStation 5	
2022	PowerWash Simulator	FuturLab	Square Enix Collective	PC, Xbox One, Xbox Series X/S	
2022	Prodeus	Bounding Box Software	Humble Games	Mac, PC, Nintendo Switch, PlayStation 4, PlayStation 5, Xbox One, Xbox Series X/S	
2022	Warhammer 40,000: Darktide	Fatshark		PC	
2023	Counter-Strike 2	Valve		PC, Linux	(Note: Counter Strike 2:)
2023	The Finals	Embark Studios		PC, Xbox Series X/S, PlayStation 5	
2023	Ghostrunner 2	One More Level	505 Games	PC, PlayStation 5, Xbox Series X/S	
2023	Overwatch 2	Blizzard Entertainment		Nintendo Switch, PlayStation 4, PlayStation 5, PC, Xbox One, Xbox Series X/S	(Note: Overwatch 2:)
2023	System Shock	Nightdive Studios	Prime Matter	PC	
2023	Turbo Overkill	Trigger Happy Interactive	Apogee Entertainment	PC, PlayStation 5, Xbox Series X/S	
2024	Call of Duty: Black Ops 6	Treyarch	Activision	PC, PlayStation 4, PlayStation 5, Xbox One, Xbox Series X/S	
2024	Echo Point Nova	Greylock Studio		PC	
2024	I Am Your Beast	Strange Scaffold		PC, iOS	
2024	Straftat	Lemaitre Bros		PC, Linux, Mac	
2024	S.T.A.L.K.E.R. 2: Heart of Chornobyl	GSC Game World		PC, Xbox Series X/S	
2025	Battlefield 6	Battlefield Studios	Electronic Arts	PC, PlayStation 5, Xbox Series X/S	(Note: Battlefield 6:)
2025	Borderlands 4	Gearbox Software	2K	PC, PlayStation 5, Xbox Series X/S	
2025	Doom: The Dark Ages	id Software	Bethesda Softworks	PC, PlayStation 5, Xbox Series X/S	
2025	Mycopunk	Pigeons at Play	Devolver Digital	PC	

== Publications ==
For instances of at least four citations, reference numbers in the notes section show which of the following publications list the game.

- The A.V. Club – 2014
- City – 2018
- Complex – 2014, 2017
- Den of Geek – 2023
- Digital Trends – 2025
- GameSpot – 2004 2026
- GamesRadar – 2026
- IGN – 2016
- Kotaku – 2023
- LaptopMag – 2022
- Maxim – 2011
- NME – 2023
- Paste – 2016
- PC Gamer – 2026
- Shortlist – 2016
- TechRadar – 2025
- Thrillist – 2016
- USgamer – 2014
- VG247 – 2024
