= Terran Republic =

Terran Republic may refer to:

- Terran Republic, a faction in the PlanetSide video game series
- Terran Republic, a government in the novels of Charles Gannon
