= Jeff Broadbent =

- Occupations: Composer; Musician; Music producer
- Years active: 1996–present
- Awards: HMMA
- Musical career
- Genres: Film score; Orchestral; Rock; Electronic; Jazz
- Instruments: Piano; Keyboard; Guitar; GuitarViol; Bass; Percussion; Saxophone
- Website: jeffbroadbent.com

Jeff Broadbent is an American multimedia composer, musician, and music producer. He has won several Hollywood Music in Media Awards and a G.A.N.G. Award for composing music for video games including PlanetSide 2, Resident Evil 3, and Transformers: Dark of the Moon, among others. He composes music for film and television as well, such as Jack Ryan: Shadow Recruit, X-Men: Days of Future Past, The Lazarus Effect, and others.

== Early life and education ==
Jeff Broadbent began taking piano and classical alto saxophone lessons at 8 years of age and later learned to play the guitar and drums. At 16 years old he began music theory and composing music. He attended Brigham Young University, where he earned a bachelor's and master's degree in music composition, as well as studying film scoring and video game scoring at UCLA.

== Career ==
Broadbent is a composer, multi-instrumentalist (piano, keyboards, guitar, guitarViol bass, percussion, saxophone), and music producer. He began working in the video game industry in 2009 and has composed and produced music scores for Bigpoint, Ubisoft, and Warner Bros.'s video games. He has worked with composers, Hans Zimmer and Lorne Balfe and has won numerous awards for composing and producing music for video games. He composed music for, Call of Duty: Mobile, Resident Evil 3, and Drakensang Online: Rise of Balor, among others, and for film and television such as X-Men: Days of Future Past, The Lazarus Effect, and others.

He cites his musical influences as composers, Mozart, Brahms, and Beethoven, as well as modern composers, Schoenberg, Morton Feldman, Tōru Takemitsu, and others.

Video Game Music

- 2022 – Call of Duty: Mobile – Original Game Soundtrack – Composer
- 2022 – Honor of Kings – 7th Anniversary Vinyl – Composer
- 2020 – Terraria: Otherworld – Official Soundtrack – Composer
- 2020 – Resident Evil 3 – Soundtrack – Composer, arranger
- 2020 – Honor of Kings Original Game – Soundtrack Vol. 1 – Composer
- 2020 – Resident Evil: Resistance – Composer
- 2019 – PlanetSide Arena – Composer
- 2019 – Grid – Original Soundtrack – Audio Design
- 2018 – Extinction (video game) – Composer
- 2018 – Arena of Valor – Soundtrack – Composer
- 2016 – Champions of Anteria – Original Game – Soundtrack – Composer
- 2016 – Assassin's Creed Identity – Composer
- 2016 – Drakensang Online: Rise of Balor – Original Soundtrack – Composer
- 2016 – Gunjack 2: End of Shift – Composer
- 2015 – EVE: Gunjack – Composer
- 2015 – Call of Duty: Black Ops III – Official Soundtrack – Performer
- 2015 – Moonrise – Composer
- 2014 – Dawngate – Composer
- 2012 – PlanetSide 2 – Composer
- 2012 – I Am Alive – Composer
- 2011 – Marvel Avengers Alliance
- 2011 – Transformers: Dark of the Moon – Original Score – Composer

== Awards ==
- 2023 – Peacekeeper Elite (Game for Peace) – Best Mobile Video Game Song/Score – Hollywood Music in Media Awards
- 2022 – League of Legends: Wild Rift (Superhero Jayce Trailer) – Best Song/Score- Trailer (Video Game) – Hollywood Music in Media Awards
- 2018 – Extinction – Best Video Game Score – Hollywood Music in Media Awards
- 2016 – Arena of Valor – Best Music in a Casual/Social Game – G.A.N.G. Awards
- 2016 – Assassin's Creed Identity – Best Mobile Video Game Song/Score – Hollywood Music in Media Awards
- 2015 – Wei Lai Zhan Chang – Best Mobile Video Game Score – Hollywood Music in Media Awards
- 2013 – Planet Side 2 – Original Game Soundtrack – Global Music Awards
- 2013 – PlanetSide 2 – Best Video Game Score – Hollywood Music in Media Awards
