= PlanetSide Arena =

- Developer: Daybreak Game Company
- Publisher: Daybreak Game Company
- Series: PlanetSide
- Engine: ForgeLight
- Platform: Microsoft Windows
- Release: September 19, 2019
- Genre: Massively multiplayer online first-person shooter
- Modes: Battle royale, capture the flag, deathmatch

PlanetSide Arena is a discontinued massively multiplayer online first-person shooter developed by Daybreak Game Company. A spin-off of PlanetSide 2, the game supported over 1,000 players per match and featured match-based capture the flag, team deathmatch, and battle royale game modes.

PlanetSide Arena was released for early access on Steam for Microsoft Windows on September 19, 2019. It was cancelled on January 10, 2020, due to low player counts.

== Gameplay ==
PlanetSide Arena features many of the same weapons, environments, game mechanics and vehicles present in PlanetSide 2, taking place on the continent Amerish years after the original conflict on the planet Auraxis has ended. Game modes, including conquest, capture the flag, team deathmatch, and battle royale are played on a single a 8km by 8km map. Like PlanetSide 2, players can pick between classes, although this has been reduced to just three from the original game's six; all classes have unique abilities and access to a jetpack. Players could also play in third-person perspective in some game modes. Players can pick up and use weapons that are scattered around the map after deploying onto the battlefield, or have access to them at the start of the round via a loot box system.

== History ==
PlanetSide Arena was initially announced by Daybreak Game Company on December 13, 2018. The game was initially planned to launch on Steam on January 29, 2019, and would not be free-to-play. It would also feature a battle pass system along with other microtransactions.

PlanetSide Arena's release was repeatedly delayed, missing its initial release date. It was released on September 19, 2019, in Early Access on Steam. The game relied on a microtransaction business model where players could purchase loot boxes to obtain cosmetics and in-game items.

On January 10, 2020, the PlanetSide Arena servers were taken down, and all in-game purchases were refunded. Consistently low player counts, caused by competition from other games in the genre like Apex Legends and general dissatisfaction with the game from PlanetSide 2 players, made playing viable matches impossible. An all-time low concurrent player count of 1 was reached near the end of the game's lifespan.

Many of the assets and graphical improvements to PlanetSide Arena were later incorporated into PlanetSide 2, including an upgrade to the ForgeLight engine to support DirectX 11.
