= PlanetSide =

MMOFPS video game series

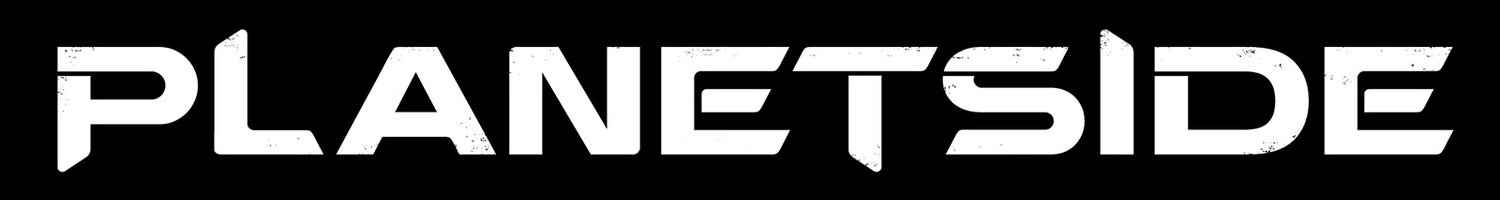
- Genre(s): Massively multiplayer online first-person shooter
- Developer(s): Rogue Planet Games
- Publisher(s): Daybreak Game Company
- First release: PlanetSide; May 20, 2003
- Latest release: PlanetSide Arena; September 19, 2019

PlanetSide is a series of massively multiplayer online first-person shooter video games published by Daybreak Game Company. The first game in the series was published by Sony Online Entertainment in 2003 for Microsoft Windows and featured thousands of players fighting over territory in a persistent world. PlanetSide 2, a sequel, was released in 2012, featuring faster-paced gameplay, modern first-person shooter mechanics and high graphical fidelity.

The main series games in the franchise chronicle the efforts of three factions (the New Conglomerate, Vanu Sovereignty and Terran Republic) as they fight for control of the planet Auraxis. Players have access to a vast arsenal of weapons and vehicles unique to their faction and engage in combined arms warfare to conquer territory in a persistent world.

Rather than featuring small, instanced matches like many other first-person shooters, the PlanetSide series features massive, seamless continents that allow battles potentially thousands of users can participate in. Both PlanetSide and PlanetSide 2 have set the Guinness World Record for "Most players in an online FPS battle," with the latter still holding the record to this day; this record has since been unofficially surpassed by PlanetSide 2 players in both 2020 and 2022.

== Plot ==
=== Factions ===
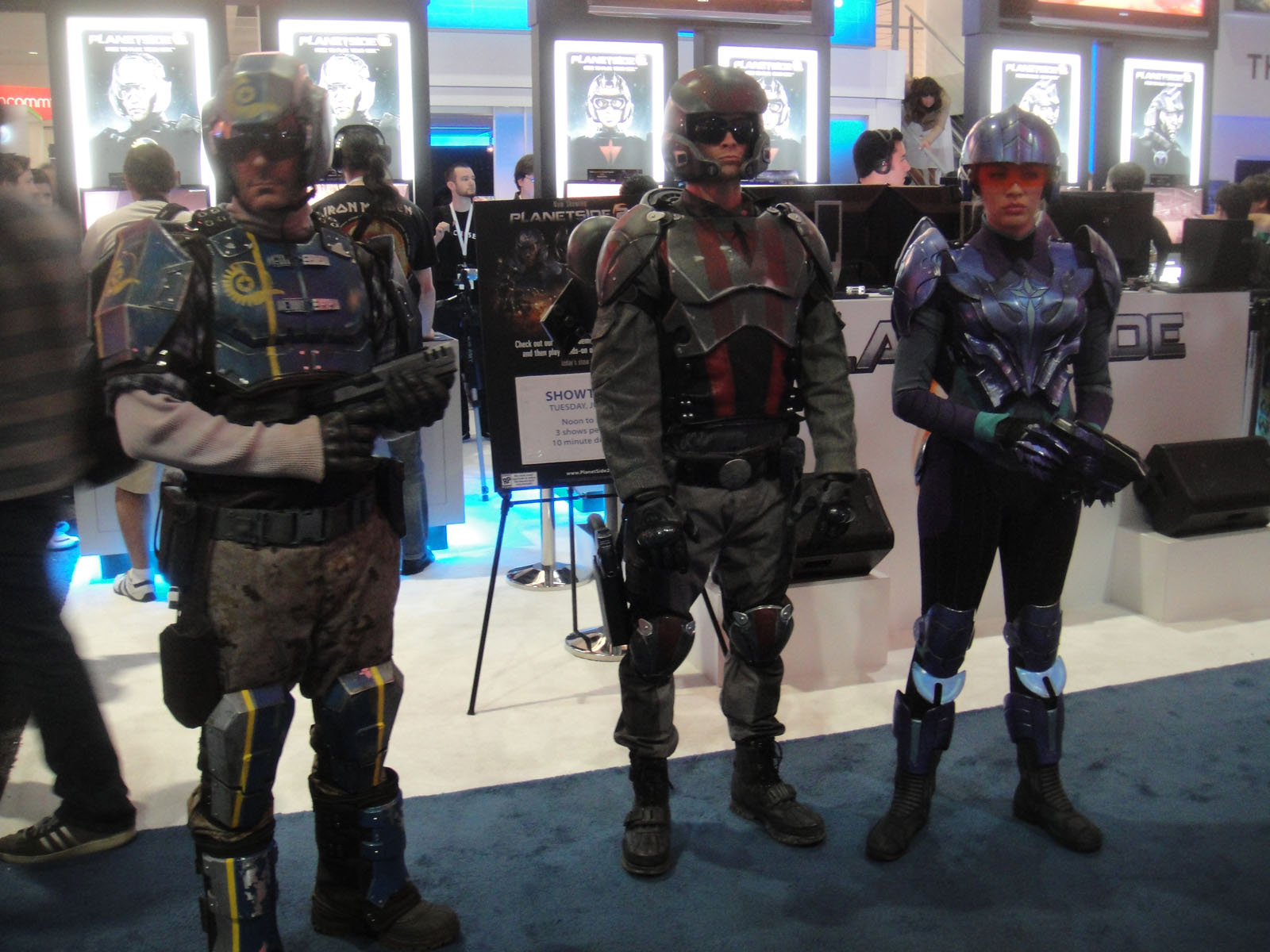
Left to right: NC, TR, and VS soldiers at the E3 2012 PlanetSide 2 showcase

==== Terran Republic (TR) ====
The Terran Republic is an authoritarian colonial government that leverages military might to maintain strict control over the colonial citizens of Auraxis, ostensibly on behalf of the mother Terran Republic back on Earth. Obsessed with the preservation of law and order, the TR see the insurrectionary war against themselves as all the more justification for strong-armed countermeasures. They are thus seen by their opponents to be an oppressive and dictatorial force, but many also view the TR as the only hope for lasting security and peace. Their colors are red and black. TR forces are distinguished by their use of rapid fire conventional weaponry, large-capacity magazines, high speed medium tanks and fast flying fighter aircraft.

==== New Conglomerate (NC) ====
The New Conglomerate operates as a loosely organized band of self-proclaimed freedom fighters. Viewed as corporate-backed terrorist guerrillas by their adversaries, they violently oppose the stranglehold that the Terran Republic has on Auraxis. Led by an unusual quorum of outcasts, frontier industrialists, pirates, and turncoat military leaders, the New Conglomerate is unwavering and prepared to achieve freedom from oppression by any means necessary. Their colors are blue and gold. NC forces use hard hitting electromagnetic weapons such as gauss and railguns that are devastating at short and medium range but are bulky and unwieldy with moderate reload speeds. They employ durable, heavily armed shock troops with slow, well-armored heavy tanks and heavy fighters loaded with arrays of crushingly powerful ordnance.

==== Vanu Sovereignty (VS) ====
The Vanu Sovereignty are a secretive and cult-like group who believe that only through the untapped power of alien technology can humanity truly evolve towards the next phase of its existence. They are a technologically advanced and cunning faction, employing powerful reverse-engineered alien technologies on the battlefield. Their singular purpose is to uncover secrets hidden away in ancient artifacts scattered over the surface of Auraxis, and fight only to seize and retain exclusive access to research sites and materials. As such, they view the war with its shifting territories and militarized zones as a pointless impedance to their infinitely more important work. Their colors are violet and cyan. The VS use advanced plasma and laser weaponry, characterized by lack of bullet drop, high accuracy, low recoil, and quick-reloadable energy cells. They deploy highly maneuverable, levitating battle tanks capable of efficiently traversing almost any terrain or incline, as well as anti-gravity fighters capable of inertia-defying breakneck aerobatics.

==== Nanite Systems Operatives (NSO) ====
Nanite Systems Operatives are not a unified group of soldiers, but rather robot mercenaries who hold no allegiance to any faction and fight on a contractual basis for the highest bidder. Nanite Systems staff operate these robotic units remotely by proxy, much unlike the fully human combatants the three factions typically employ. NSO units are automatically assigned to the Terran Republic, New Conglomerate or Vanu Sovereignty depending on which faction has the lowest population, but can also remain loyal to one faction unconditionally (available only to subscribed players in-game). Although they lack access to other empires' weapons and vehicles, NSO units can use all common pool equipment, which emphasizes versatility and utility, in addition to their own unique arsenal of weapons and vehicles.

== Games ==
Release timeline
2003	PlanetSide
2004–2011
2012	PlanetSide 2
2013–2018
2019	PlanetSide Arena

=== Main series ===
==== PlanetSide ====
PlanetSide was released for Microsoft Windows on May 20, 2003. Multiple expansions for the game were released throughout its lifespan. Active development ceased and the game became free-to-play on April 29, 2014. The game's servers were permanently closed on July 1, 2016.

==== PlanetSide 2 ====
PlanetSide 2 was released for Microsoft Windows on November 20, 2012. A port for the PlayStation 4 console was released on June 23, 2015. The game is a re-imagining of the original game, featuring the same factions, setting and story as its prequel.

=== Cancelled ===
==== PlanetSide Next ====
PlanetSide Next was a version of PlanetSide with updated assets developed by Sony Online Entertainment's SOGA studio for release in Asian markets. The project was cancelled after the studio was shut down.

==== PlanetSide Arena ====
PlanetSide Arena was a spin-off of PlanetSide 2 released for early access on Steam for Microsoft Windows on September 19, 2019. The game supported matches with thousands of players and featured game modes including battle royale, capture the flag and team deathmatch. A console port of the game was planned as well. The game's servers were shut down on January 10, 2020 due to low player counts and competition from similar titles like Apex Legends.
