= PlanetSide (video game) =

2003 massively-multiplayer online first-person-shooter video game

- Developer: Sony Online Entertainment (Note: Additional development by Lodestone Games)
- Publishers: NA: Sony Online Entertainment; EU: Ubi Soft
- Series: PlanetSide
- Platform: Microsoft Windows
- Release: NA: May 19, 2003; UK: May 23, 2003
- Genre: MMOFPS
- Mode: Multiplayer

PlanetSide is a discontinued 2003 massively-multiplayer online first-person-shooter video game developed and published by Sony Online Entertainment.

PlanetSide chronicles the efforts of three factions as they fight for territorial control over ten different continents on the planet Auraxis. Players take on the role of individual soldiers fighting for one of the three factions within the game, and can specialize in various fields such as combat vehicle crewman, infantry, invisible infiltrator or a variety of combat support roles; such as combat medic or combat engineer. The game is played primarily in a first person perspective, with the option of third-person.

Unlike most shooting games, in which small-scale matches take place in essentially an instanced map, PlanetSide battles can involve hundreds of players in a single fight. PlanetSide battles concern control over territory and strategic points, and can cause repercussions to all three factions. To date, PlanetSide remains one of the few MMOFPS games ever created. A sequel, PlanetSide 2, was released in November 2012. Rather than a direct sequel, it is a "re-imagining" of the first game. On January 24, 2014 Sony Online Entertainment announced that the game was going to be free-to-play in April 2014. The game was officially launched as free to play on April 29, 2014, after several delays. On July 1, 2016, at 4:00pm PT, the servers went offline permanently.

PlanetSide holds the Guinness World Record for "Most players online at one time in an FPS war game," which was set when 6,400 players were active at once on the game's Emerald server. It once broke the record for "Most players in an online FPS battle" as well with 600 players (now held by the game's sequel, PlanetSide 2).

== Plot ==
After exploring through a deep space wormhole, the Terran Republic, a highly centralized oligarchic galactic government which had unconditionally ruled humanity for the past thousand years, discovered a single habitable planet. Not only was this planet suitable for the sustenance of life, but it also already possessed many native, highly developed, and staggeringly familiar flora. The Science Institute named this planet Auraxis. Taking a keen interest in this aberration, the Republic quickly sent expeditions through the wormhole to explore and colonize the planet. Shortly after arriving, the colonists discovered the remains and technology of a lost and ancient alien species – the Vanu (or Ancients). This technology proved to be so complex and powerful as to barely be conceivable to human minds, involving levels of energy previously thought to be physically unquantifiable. This allowed for the quick colonization of the ten continents of Auraxis, the creation of power sources and vehicles for the use of the colonists and, most importantly, it facilitated the development of rebirthing technology. This nanotechnology allowed the Terrans to deconstruct and reconstruct their own bodies, allowing fast transportation across the world. Later on, it was discovered that dead workers could be brought back to life using the technology, revealing a startling new possibility: immortality. Needless to say, the incredible power (and value) of this technology was systemically acknowledged, and despite the scale of the advances made due to the study of the technology, it was also recognized that humanity had not yet even scratched the surface of any future possibilities. Later on, the discovery that the planet itself had been an artificial construction of the Ancients further served to solidify the realization that, if left unchecked, Vanu technology would forever and irrevocably change humanity and its future.

Shortly after the rebirthing technology was discovered, the wormhole collapsed, cutting the colony off from the Mother Republic and preventing the return of Vanu technology for proper examination. The Republic authorities took measures to hide this fact, while desperately exhausting all theoretical options for re-establishing the traversability of the wormhole. Meanwhile, as widespread usage of the technology grew, the Republic began to fear the potential repercussions of allowing so much power to be shifted so quickly into the hands of so many people. Namely, it feared that the rebirthing technology and the potential impunity to death, disease, and pain it afforded would cause massive philosophical shifts amongst the isolated population, thus pulling out one leg of the tripod that had sustained the Republic for a millennium: that of deterrence. More generally, the military feared that if use of the technology continued to spread, that the other two bases might come away as well: a populace armed with practically god-like power would have very little need of a strong authoritarian body to provide structure and purpose to their lives. Based on these trepidations, the Republic began to restrict usage of the new technologies, and halted all further research and development involving the Ancient Tech.

It was too late, however, and their concerns began to materialize earlier than they had expected. As research diminished, so too did hopes of reopening the wormhole. As news of this began to escape the scientific community, general dissension set in. Among the populace, a great resultant of the loss of faith in the capability of the Republic (which had always presented itself as infallible) was a split in their loyalties. Two distinct groups emerged: the loyalists and the separatists. The separatists argued that the recent behavior of the Republic was full of obvious knee-jerk moves and over-reactive mistakes. Claiming that the Republic knew its end was at hand, the separatists advocated breaking away and forming a new society, now that their would-be "oppressors" were isolated and without aid. The loyalists countered that the Republic had never been abusive (a claim hotly debated) and had always looked out for its own, and that the Terran people at least owed them continued loyalty on that point alone. Meanwhile, in the intellectual circles and among the scientific establishment, there had long been the feeling that the Republic was ill at-ease with the possibilities of the New Science, and a movement had begun to sequester and conceal as many of the Vanu artifacts as could be feasibly obtained without overt notice.

As the Terran demographic continued to polarize, these movements finally came to fruition as the predecessors of the Vanu Sovereignty made their exodus and took with them the research and artifacts they had managed to stockpile over the Auraxian years. Encouraged by this, the separatists seceded, seizing a number of military stockpiles and procuring a small arsenal of military assets: they called themselves the New Conglomerate. In a backlash to this, the Republic declared these two factions outlawed, announcing their intentions to reunify with them at all costs. Shortly after this, war broke out between the Terran Republic and the New Conglomerate. Not long after, the Vanu Sovereignty was attacked by the New Conglomerate and dragged into the war.

== Factions ==
=== Terran Republic (TR) ===
A conservative, authoritarian, collectivist nation who strive to regain contact with the homeworld and reunite the warring factions. Their leadership is a public oligarchy known as the Overwatch, composed of various representative officials and their associated Ministries, who regulate allotted portions of society in accordance with their own expertise and the collective will towards favourable outcomes. They believe that authority is the bastion that protects humanity and that in a truly free society, with no Big Brother to guide and watch over citizens, misery and suffering would quickly be visited to all. Furthermore, they regard the Vanu technology as dangerous and disruptive, a chaotic force threatening the stability of their righteous order, and only begrudgingly do they use it in warfare. Their vision of the future is one of peace restored through their benevolent rule, and humanity reunited by the reopening of the wormhole. They stand by the view that the Vanu became extinct by meddling with power on the orders of magnitude which was to be found in their artifacts and technologies, and they fear groups such as the Sovereignty will drive humanity to a similar fate, causing as much damage to reality as possible along the way. Their ordnance is characterized by its high rate of fire and ammo consumption.

=== New Conglomerate (NC) ===
A separatist faction determined to remain free of the controlling and domineering Republic, as well as to liberate the rest of humanity from the Republic, whether or not they share the Conglomerate's theories. Unlike the authoritarian and technocratic TR and VS governments, the NC are fighting for democracy, freedom, and human rights. As a rebel group, their leadership lies with the Revolutionary Command, a visible co-operative of military experts and leaders who direct the liberation efforts as a whole. They feel that any form of control is oppression and that a miserable free man is better off than a contented slave. Consequently, they view the Vanu technology as a potential tool of control, and the Vanu Sovereignty as technocratic tyrants, would-be dictators like the Republic, only under the banner of science and probably much worse. Their view of the future is one of freedom and self-government, where every man elects his own path and flourishes in what ways he sees fit. They rely on ponderous vehicles and slow-firing heavy weaponry, foregoing mobility and tactical flexibility for heavy armor and superior firepower. As their name suggests, the New Conglomerate is a diverse collection of forces that have banded-together (but have little trust of one another): ordinary citizens drawn into the conflict, various rebel groups that were previously autonomous, expatriate Terran and Vanu soldiers, and the Expeditionary Force ("XForce") of the Royal House of Auraxis (the rightful heirs to the Vanu throne, forced into exile, the sole possessors of a working wormhole). The NC's democratic philosophy is often their Achilles' heel militarily, as they lack the iron-fisted leadership structure of the TR and VS. From the New Conglomerate's point of view, however, theirs is the only moral and just cause.

=== Vanu Sovereignty (VS) ===
A loose transhumanist group of academics, intellectuals, and common people who believe that human destiny lies in the further development and exploitation of the alien technology. Their leadership is the clandestine Sovereignty Council, the composition of which is unknown without itself and the existence of which is obscured to those outside the Sovereignty. They see the Republic as pedantic and outmoded; a used-up idea and restriction on the continuing ascendancy of the species through the synthesis of man and machine. They also see the New Conglomerate as a savage, ochlocratic band of thugs who have repackaged old mistakes in new dressings and are desperately afraid of new concepts which they cannot grasp, and the future these promise to the far-sighted. Their view of the future is one of scientific perfection and purity: they believe that the Vanu used the power of their advanced technologies to transcend their physical limitations and the mundane world, ascending to a superior state of being, and ultimately, a higher plane of existence. Scientists and intellectuals through-and-through, they see this path as an enlightened ascension and hold the Ancients up as a shining example for mankind to follow. Hopefully and eagerly they envision humanity imitating this metamorphosis, firstly through the enhancement of the human condition via "hypertech" (foreseeable technological breakthroughs which have not yet quite arrived), and eventually, by the replacement of human beings altogether; from there, not even they can imagine yet. They are most reliant on alien science and technology, and often more than compensate for their shortcomings through the superiority of their engineering, using mind-bending physics, high-energy arrays, and other exotic weaponry to defend themselves.

== Gameplay ==
Gameplay took place on the ground and in the air, across desert, mountains, forests and swamps, with factions attempting to capture as many facilities as possible on the surface of the planet while denying them to their enemy. There are many strategies and opportunities that skilled players can use in order to direct combat operations. The player controls their chosen character from a first-person perspective, with an optional third-person mode.

=== Character progression ===
PlanetSide featured an experience/leveling system. Earned experience is divided into three categories: Battle Experience, Support Experience, and Command Experience. Battle Experience is gained from elimination of enemy soldiers, the capture of base facilities, and exploring and interacting with the game world. Support Experience is earned through "Assist" kills: after aiding another player, the first player gains a percentage of experience the other player gains through kills. Command Experience was gained from leading a squad or platoon in a successful base capture. Functionally, Battle Experience and Support Experience are identical, both contributing towards Battle Rank, which lead to benefits such as the ability to use different equipment, implants, or appearance upgrades. Accumulated Command Experience let the player use several team-oriented abilities.

=== Server shutdown ===
On July 1, 2016, at 4:00pm PT, Planetside servers went offline permanently.

A fan-made recreation of the original servers called PlanetSide Forever began development shortly before the shutdown.

PlanetSide 2 was officially released on November 20, 2012.

== Reception ==
PlanetSide was a runner-up for Computer Games Magazine's list of the 10 best games of 2003. However, it won the magazine's "Best Technology" award.

Although the initial game was well received, Core Combat, the game's only expansion, was released six months after release with a mediocre response. It added six new caverns, three new vehicles, and three new weapons.
