= Social interaction and first-person shooters =

Multiplayer video game behavior

In first-person shooters, players participate in weapon-based combat all in the first person, or from the perspective of their character. A notable features of FPS games is its compatibility for networked, then later online, multiplayer gaming, where players could bring their skills to a national and then later a global arena. In a genre consisting of players hunting and killing other players, FPS games are found to include a source of rich communication and social interactions between players.

== Online communication ==
Communication online consists of a mix of both verbal and non-verbal interactions. Like in the real world, these interactions have individual meanings, social norms, policies, and a set of subsequent reactions to these interactions. All these interactions are aided and have become possible with advancements and the developing of game technology and design.

=== Arenas for communication ===
Online interactions between individuals is not a new medium for socialization. Console creators such as Microsoft (Xbox gaming console) and Sony (PlayStation gaming console) advertise their console releases referencing the idea of "the Third Place." The metaphor of "the Third Place" references an idea invented by Ray Oldenburg in 1989. He described "the Third Place" as a distinct arena other than one's home and workplace, which is conductive to socializing. As Oldenburg described it: “Third places exist on neutral ground and serve to level their guests to a condition of social equality. Within these places, conversation is the primary activity and a major vehicle for the display and appreciation of human personality and individuality. Third places are taken for granted and most have a low-profile. The character of a third place is determined most of all by its regular clientele and is marked by a playful mood.”

==== Pre-game lobbies ====
In FPS, there are a number of arenas where interactions occur between players, the first interaction being pre-game lobbies. In pre-game lobbies, players communicate with one another over tactics, harass players on the other team, chat generally between members and friends on the same team, and offer new releases in the genre (new patches, politics of companies, thoughts of recent or upcoming conventions, etc.). All of these interactions tend to be verbal because players have not yet entered the game. However, these actions impact the manner in which players perform in game. Players may perform better or worse depending on the emotional/psychological impact of the interactions on the player. These players are better suited to carry the burden to play better than those who become distracted by interactions.

=== In-game ===
==== Verbal communication ====
In-game chat is the most popular of arena for interaction. Players can communicate between other players on the same team through a system supported by Voice Over IP using a microphone and headset. Players use this time for a number of types of communication:

Creative game talk
naming or identity talk; joking, irony, and word play; changing game rules and technical limits, and popular culture references to in-game talk.
Game conflict talk
players communicate about different problems with the game experience: camping (when a player remains in one place, usually in a strategic or choke point of the map), accusations on cheating, about kicking or banning, and over ways of dealing with rule breaking or rules of the game.
Insult/distancing talk
taunting or trash talking, annoyance talk, explicit gendered, racialized, or homophobic talk, or pissed off talk.
Performance talk
re-locaters (the blaming of something else for "failed performance), vulnerability/apologies for failure talk, final scene talk ("showdowns" near the end of game or between the last players of the game), game strategy/tactical talk, team talk (switching teams or choosing teams), friendly fire talk (apologies for team killing), support talk, teaching talk, game action, dead talk, or kill talk (usually in response to a "good" kill).
Game technical/external talk
ping rate/lag talk, talk about technical matters, talk about other games, clan talk/statistics talk, map related talk, or requests for information.

In-game communication also has an alternate form, a non-verbal aspect of communication between players.

==== Non-verbal communication ====
Gestures and character actions makeup the majority of non-verbal communication. Just like in real life, online communication is a mix between verbal and non-verbal communication which have their own syntax and accepted meaning in the gaming community. "Teabagging" is a well known and popular non-verbal action commonly found in the Halo (Halo 2 and so on) series. Teabagging is when a character kills their opponent then subsequently goes from standing to crouching while standing over a body of a dead foe or teammate. "Camping" is another form of non-verbal communication where a player remains at one point on the map where one has an advantage over other players because of strategic or a choke point on the map. Camping usually gets an enraged response from other players and usually the players gains a less favorable outlook from opposing players. "Sniping" is a subsection of camping, though seen as a more legitimate form of motionless combat, players have problems with efficient snipers who gain a location with full coverage of the combat zone, or map. "Shot in the dark", or popularly known as "pray-and-spray" or "poke-and-hope", is when a player "fires from the hip" (firing without aiming down their sight) and does not aim for a specific target on their opponent. Most FPS players pride themselves on their skill and tactics and do not see blindly firing down range as evidence of lack of skill.

==== Post-game and scoreboard lobby ====
After the final kills were accounted for and a team was named victorious the game transitions to the post-game/scoreboard lobby. Like pre-game communication, most are confined to verbal communication. Post-game chatter consists mostly of play-by-play of the recent game performances, trash talking between players on opposing teams, and excitement for future games between teammates and friends.

== Socializing online ==
Playing online games is not just for the mere fact of showing off one's skills in the digital arena, the real draw for opponents and the draw for even participating in the digital arena is the knowledge that there is a real, emotional being on the other end to compete against. Individuals who play online games, especially FPS players, do not play for intellectual or educational reasons, however, most play for the social world that they have the opportunity to get involved with. The social world that they seek includes ultra-competitiveness, forming clans, trash-talking, swearing at the winners, and lording over the losers.

=== Identity ===
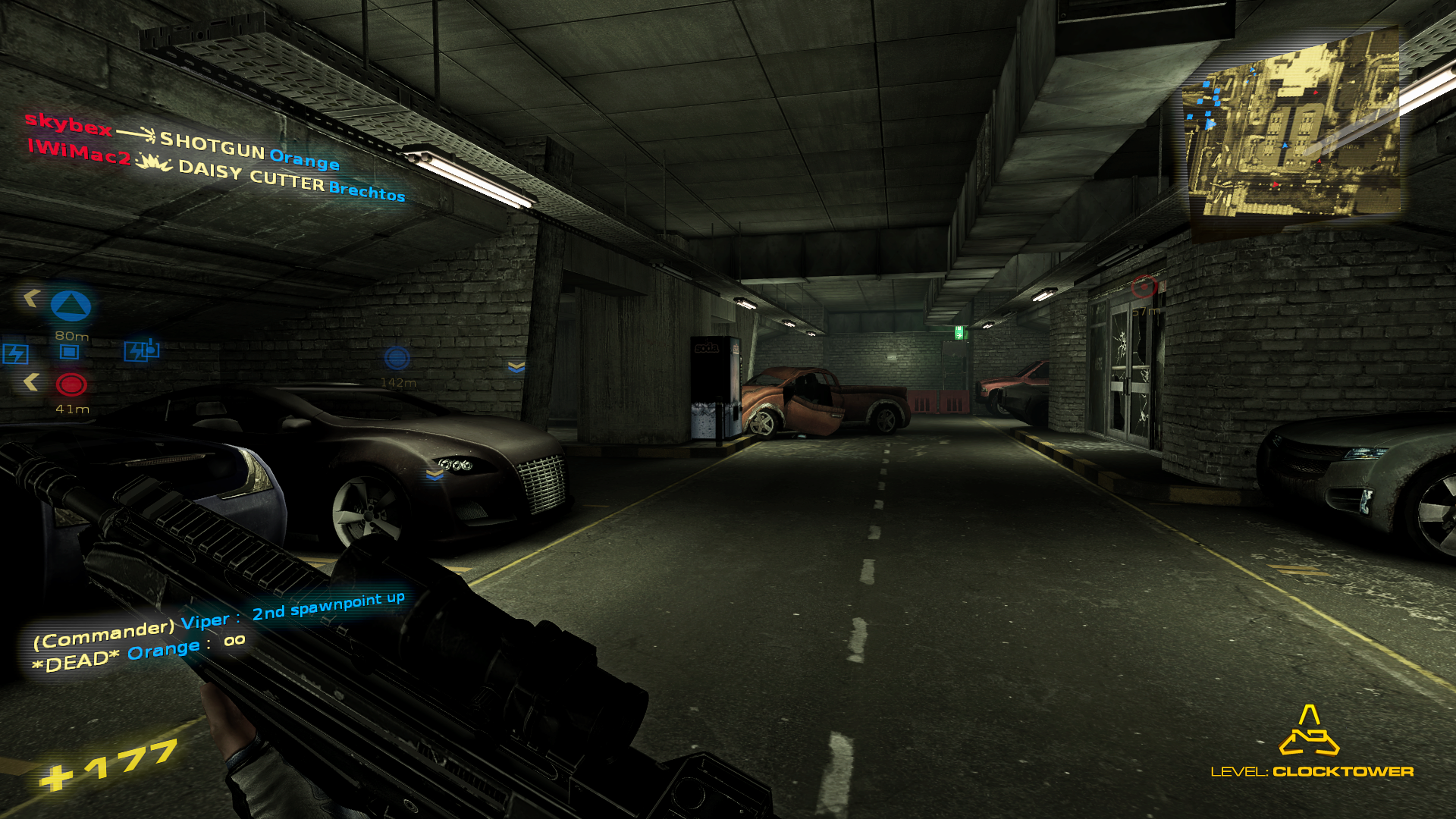
A deathmatch in the game Nuclear Dawn displays the gamertags of players who have killed others, in the top left

For all prospective and current gamers, establishing and developing one's identity is crucial and only natural in a social arena. Identity can take many forms.

Gamertags are personally customable for every player and are the "name" that one takes when playing games online. What one calls oneself is a basic forms of identity even in the real world. For FPS, and other online games, gamer-tags keep individual players anonymous to other players while they interact in the virtual world. Though usually players form their gamer-tags to depict humorous topics but other gamer-tags display a player's ties to online clans or preference on game titles. On some systems such tags can be a single identity that remains constant regardless of game or vendor.

Within a particular game, a character class is a specific role that a player fits into when playing the game, comparable to the role in a workplace. A player then hones their skills and strategies to become the most dominant player, of this type, on the battlefield.

=== Side effects in online communication ===
It is a non-disputed fact that game players seek out game play for social reasons, but especially in networked games, the attractions are the other players, the relationships between them, and their impact on out-of-game community and relationships.

==== Differences in gender ====
Differences in gender among players is a very common topic of discussion between players, in analyses in published written works, in internet forums, game critics, and game designers/makers. Games are made with expectations pre-incorporated into the designing process, gender is employed as a basic social demographic control, rather than as a dynamic element that shapes how players approach games, interact within them, and negotiate expectations. The subject of gender role theory, or shared cultural expectations that are placed on individuals on the basis of their socially defined gender, is one lens in which researchers observe interactions online between players.

===== Gender stereotypes =====
In online gaming, the majority of the gaming population is male. In fact, 40 percent of gamers online are female and the number of females gamers over the age of eighteen compose a greater part of the gamer population than males under the age of seventeen. According to the gender role theory and the observations in Dmitri Williams' article on gender roles in video games, since males by nature exhibit traits of competitiveness, aggression, and being ambitious, men are more likely to find interest in video games and are more likely to play them longer and more frequently than women.

Male and female players and what they set out to achieve in video games is different when they play. In the observations of Dmitri Williams, male play tends to more achievement-oriented reasons, while female players tend to play for socializing aspects of play.

===== Sexual harassment =====
In online gaming, female players face sexual harassment and hazing in game as well as in tournament play.

==== Trash-talking ====
With all of the different types of verbal communication that occurs in chat, trash-talking is the most common way players socialize online. Trash-talking is a form of discourse that happens when a subject tries to anger or make fun of another player in attempt to show dominance. Trash-talking is observed in any game title that exists online. Trash talking goes both ways, when a player cannot back up their taunts players on the same team will verbally attacks teammates who do not hold their end on the battlefield. Players who talk but cannot act are disapproved of in games and seen as socially unacceptable by players.
