= MAG (video game) =

2010 video game

- North American box art
- Developer: Zipper Interactive
- Publisher: Sony Computer Entertainment
- Director: Ed Byrne
- Producer: Alan Van Slyke
- Designer: Andy Beaudoin
- Programmers: Nate Klee, Mike Nicolella
- Platform: PlayStation 3
- Release: NA: January 26, 2010; EU: January 29, 2010; AU: February 11, 2010
- Genres: Massively multiplayer online, first-person shooter
- Mode: Multiplayer

MAG is a discontinued 2010 massively multiplayer online first-person shooter video game developed by Zipper Interactive and published by Sony Computer Entertainment for the PlayStation 3. MAG received an award from Guinness World Records as "Most Players in a Console FPS" with 256 players.

On January 28, 2014, the online servers for MAG were shut down. Due to its reliance on online play, it is no longer possible to play the game.

== Gameplay ==
First in-game screenshot (from internal play sessions)

MAG used a new server architecture to support online battles with up to 256 players, with users divided into eight-player squads, with four squads forming a platoon, and four platoons forming a company. Each squad was led by a player who has advanced through the game's ranking system. Character statistics and development also increased with frequent gameplay. The players assigned leadership positions were able to simultaneously direct the battle and participate directly in combat.

Version 2.0 introduced a new skill tree and also a supply depot for purchasing weapons. Now, in the skill tree there are individual classes in which players can spend their skill points Players now have a balance in the supply depot, which is money that is earned from every match. So instead of getting the weapons/attachments in the skill tree they can now be purchased separately. After an item is bought players have the choice of selling that item for half of its original price.

Patch v1.05 introduced a modified leadership selection algorithm that relied on using leadership points that players earned by winning battles while being at least a squad leader and whether the player has a Bluetooth headset or not.

Basic battles take place within ongoing, faction-based campaigns to encourage the player to actively play. The game's E3 unveiling trailer featured large landscapes, tactics such as air strikes and parachuting, and a variety of vehicles, from tanks and armored personnel carriers (APCs) to airplanes.

Players were able to customize the face, voice, and armor of their characters, as well as what weapons and kit they carry into battle. In game, the player could level up to 70 on any faction. After achieving level 70, players could enter the Veteran mode and be allowed to re-select their faction. Players lose progress by starting Veteran mode, although the medals, ribbons, statistics and the leadership points player has earned in the past remain intact. Players also received a +10% XP bonus which did not stack.

=== Gameplay Modes ===
Gameplay consists of six separate modes (two of which—Interdiction and Escalation—are downloadable content) and an additional training mode.

==== Suppression ====
The smallest gameplay mode in terms of scale and the only mode that did not influence the Shadow War, Suppression was a team deathmatch mode that pits 32 players of one faction against 32 players of another. Provided they meet the qualification requirements, players can be assigned leadership positions in this game mode, although they have no leadership abilities. There are 4 Squad Leaders (SL) and 1 Platoon Leader (PL) per faction in this game type. Suppression makes use of modified maps from the Sabotage game mode.

==== Sabotage ====
Sabotage was the smallest mode of those with Shadow War influence. It was played by 64 players from two of the game's three factions, 32 players to a side. In Sabotage, the attacking team must work to secure two enemy satellite uplink centers—objectives A and B. Once both centers have been secured and simultaneously held, objective C is unlocked—the defending team's base. The attackers then need to plant an explosive charge at C and defend it until it explodes to win. As in Suppression, there are 4 SLs and 1 PL per faction in this game type. Again, they have no leadership abilities yet, but communication and organization is the leadership key to victory in this mode. The game runs on a 20-minute timer, countdown of which is paused while a charge is active at C. If the time expires before the attackers have destroyed C, the defenders win.

==== Acquisition ====
Acquisition pits one faction against another, 128 players per game, 64-player factions, and is MAG's variant on the Capture the Flag game type. The maps are split into two sides, facing one platoon (4 squads) from each faction against another, as the attacking team attempts to capture 2 of the defending team's "prototype" Escort Vehicles (APC). These vehicles are placed deep within the defending team's territory on each side of the map and a row of 4 bunkers, which the attackers can destroy, stand in the way. This is the first mode with Leadership Abilities. In addition to bunkers, the defenders have other assets which the attackers may destroy. They are: the Anti-Aircraft Artillery (AAA), Mortar Battery, Sensor Array, and Motor Pools. These, along with the bunkers, are optional destruction targets. The Mortar Battery allows Squad Leaders (SL) and Platoon Leaders (PL) to call in artillery strikes, such as mortar barrages and poison gas. Destruction of this asset takes away these abilities until the defenders repair the asset. The Sensor Array allows the PL to call in a sensor sweep, which reveals enemy locations on the mini-map—its destruction takes away that ability. The AAA serves two purposes: blocking the attacking team's SLs and PL abilities (aerial strikes and UAV recon) and prevents forward spawning. Destruction of the AAA allows the attackers to use their leadership abilities, and also to spawn into battle behind the defenders' bunker line either in an immovable helicopter or by parachuting. The Motor Pools give no leadership abilities, but they spawn APCs which the defenders can use to get to the front lines quicker and to defend funneling points with its turret. The attackers must make their way to the back of the map, open the Escort Vehicle's containers (by hacking a control panel), and drive the vehicle to their own container at the other end of the map. If the attackers get hold of an escort vehicle, the defenders must destroy it. In the vehicle's way stands roadblocks and a gate, which must be destroyed to drive the APC by. If the bunkers are not destroyed, the defenders way spawn in them making it easier for them to destroy the stolen APC on its way by. The bunkers also have a very dangerous turret, which can be destroyed independently of the bunker. Attackers win by capturing 2 vehicles; defenders win by preventing them to do so before the 20 minute timer expires.

==== Interdiction ====
The Interdiction is available via downloadable content (DLC). In this mode, 128 players (64 vs. 64) must capture and hold three neutral bases. The longer a PMC holds a base, a bar for that PMC will fill up on the top of the screen. In addition each 8-person squad has an APC. The maps for the Interdiction mode are themed after the 3 PMCs but are neutral, meaning Valor could face Raven on the S.V.E.R. themed map and any other combination. The game is set on a 20-minute timer, and whoever fills their bar first, or whoever has their bar filled the most at the end, wins.

==== Domination ====
The largest game mode was Domination. It supported 256 players, 128 to a side in a single game. Maps were split into 4 sides that meet in the middle, facing one platoon (4 squads) of attackers against another of defenders on each side. The objective of the attackers was to unlock and hold the lettered objectives, A through H, two to a platoon, located at the center of the map where it crosses, to fill a damage bar before the game timer expires. In order to unlock their objectives, each attacking platoon must capture and simultaneously hold both of the defending platoon's burnoff towers. Once that is accomplished, the platoons must then hold both cooling towers, and then the objectives are unlocked. Between the burnoff towers and the cooling towers stands a row of 4 bunkers (one for each defending squad). Destruction of the bunkers changes that defending squad's spawn to the back spawn, behind the lettered objectives, in the middle of the map where the sides meet.

As in Acquisition, the defenders had assets which the attackers were able to destroy to take away their SL and PL abilities until they are repaired. These assets are located between the cooling towers and the lettered objectives. Taking down the AAA will again allow the attacking SLs and PLs to call in their abilities, and will unlock the forward spawns located between the defenders' bunkers and the cooling towers. In addition to Squad Leaders (16 per faction, per domination game) and Platoon Leaders (4 per faction), Domination introduces the Officer In Charge (OIC) leadership position. This is the highest ranking leadership position in the game, and each is assigned to lead their 128 players to Domination victory. OICs have very powerful abilities that can affect spawning rates of the defenders and replenish or block the abilities of SLs and PLs. These abilities are not affected by the AAA or assets, and they can be used at any time (provided the other OIC hasn't blocked it). Holding the lettered objectives until the damage bar is filled wins the game for the attackers; preventing them to do so by the time the 30 minute timer expires won the game for the defenders.

==== Escalation ====
Escalation (DLC) is the first mode to feature all three PMCs fighting on the same map. Up to 96 players, 32 per PMC can play. The idea of Escalation is for one team to capture two of three letters on the map A, B, or C. When two of the letters are successfully obtained and defended, the letter "D" will be unlocked. At this point, the team which captured the two points will have to make their way to D and defend it. The other letters will become locked during this time. The other two PMCs will attempt to secure D. If one of the attackers obtains D the other letters will be opened again and all three PMCs will have to do the same thing again in order to unlock D. Every time D is unlocked by a certain team the bar will increase for that PMC. The team who fills the bar the most wins the game. No strikes can be called in by the platoon and squad leaders.

== Development and release ==
MAG was previously titled MAG: Massive Action Game. The game was announced at Sony's E3 2008 press conference. Various subtitles were being considered for the game, including MAG: Shadow War, MAG: Zero, MAG: Global Assault and MAG: Final Hour. The Massive Action Game subtitle was used in the Japanese release, but not elsewhere.

The game had three different soundtracks, one for each faction. The soundtrack for S.V.E.R. was composed by Perttu Kivilaakso and Mikko Sirén from the Finnish cello metal band, Apocalyptica. The soundtrack for Valor was composed by Tree Adams. The soundtrack for Raven was composed by Sascha Dikiciyan aka Sonic Mayhem.

=== Beta testing ===
Private beta invitations were sent to members who applied for the beta in the first half of August. The beta was limited to run only during designated time slots. Aside from players, this phase of private beta included members from the press as well. Zipper Interactive revealed the official public beta would launch on September 17. Private beta testers were also invited to the Qore beta. Annual subscribers to Qore who subscribed before September 17 had a chance to get into the beta on September 17. The final version of the beta was v1.50. The beta ended on December 5. An open beta was made available on the PlayStation Store for download on January 4, 2010, and ended on January 10, 2010. A new open beta was downloadable from the PlayStation Store starting August 24, 2010, and ending September 24, 2010.

=== Social networking ===
www.jointheshadowwar.com was a custom-built site that used Facebook Connect as a central component to building a community of MAG users on Facebook. The site was presented as an underground recruiting company called Private Recruiting Operation (PRO) that could help "free agents" (military people that were put out of a job as a result of the game's fictional future). The site allowed visitors to "Enlist" and log in using their Facebook account to do so. However, the site has since been shut down.

=== Downloadable content ===
Zipper Interactive released their first DLC pack for free on the PlayStation Network on March 25. The DLC featured a new kind of grenade, skins, and special editions of the light machine guns. Zipper released the second DLC pack on April 19 with new sniper rifles and a new armor type.

Zipper Interactive released a new DLC pack called MAG Interdiction Mission Pack, which is the first DLC pack that was released. The pack featured a new 128-player game type called Interdiction. The DLC included three maps and also featured improved heavy armor and enhanced vehicle combat, new unlockable trophies, and new ribbons. The fourth DLC entitled Escalation was released to tie in with the release of the 2.0 beta version of MAG.

"Escalation" was the second add-on that was released. This DLC was released with three faction-themed neutral maps to play on. New trophies, ribbons, and guns were included in the pack.

Zipper Interactive and Sony released a MAG demo for download on the PlayStation Store at no charge. The demo includes every weapon, map, character skill, and mode, but there is a level cap of eight. The demo was released to the North American store on March 29, 2011.

All of MAG's downloadable content is no longer available.

== Story ==
=== Background ===
The game begins in 2025. As time passes, maintaining a full-scale military becomes a burden. In a globalized world, the only security threat is from small scale rogue organizations against whom large conventional forces are useless, and the fuel needed to supply increasingly mechanized armies becomes more costly.

As a result, most nations' armies decrease to the size necessary to defend against a "national emergency." Furthermore, under the "Millennium Accord", no nation's military is permitted to leave its own borders, officially creating world peace. In their place rise Private Military Corporations. They have two advantages: first, they compete, lowering their cost, and second, they are allowed to work for anyone, anywhere.

In an unregulated global economy, the companies soon compete by less than honest means. After enough mergers, bargains, and buy-outs, however, the remaining PMCs decide to put their weapons to full use. The original attacks follow a simple plan: neutralize a competitor's soldiers, lowering supply to cause them to charge more and, ultimately, go out of business.

The Shadow War, as it is called, grows in secret until the conflict moves into full swing, with the PMCs securing their own interests and violently fighting for contracts.

=== Factions ===
The game contains three different PMCs:

- Raven Industries GmbH, a faction based in Vienna, Austria, with personnel from Italy, France, Germany, and other western European nations. Raven believes that precision in training creates perfection on the battlefield. Raven's operatives are high-tech, elite soldiers exposed to the latest virtual training techniques.
- S.V.E.R. (Seryi Volk Executive Response), a guerrilla-style militant force based in Grozny, in the Chechen Republic in Russia. Their personnel are drawn from China, India and Russia, as well as some African and Middle Eastern nations. They're infamous for their passion of battle, and makeshift tactics.
- Valor Company Inc., made up of U.S., British, Canadian and Latin American special forces, has elite, experienced soldiers, tough weaponry, and reliable vehicles. Valor's tech is based on the modern American military. Valor is based in Alaska and North-Western Canada.

== Reception ==
Reception

Aggregate score
Aggregator	Score
Metacritic	76/100

Review scores
Publication	Score
Destructoid	8/10
Eurogamer	7/10
Game Informer	7/10
GameDaily	7/10
GameRevolution	B+
GameSpot	8/10
GameSpy	3.5/5
GamesRadar+	3.5/5
GameTrailers	8.2/10
Giant Bomb	4/5
Hardcore Gamer	4/5
IGN	(UK) 7.6/10 (US) 7/10
PlayStation: The Official Magazine	3.5/5
Push Square	8/10
Common Sense Media	4/5
Teletext GameCentral	7/10

At the time of release, the game received "generally favorable reviews" according to the review aggregation website Metacritic. GameTrailers gave the game praise for its large multiplayer and inventive level-up system. G4 gave the game four out of five, saying that it was a good addition to the PlayStation 3's library. IGN US complained about bugs, stiff animations, unbalanced factions and overall lack of content and polish for the price. IGN UK complained about the same problems. GameSpot praised the well-integrated command structure, but complained about technical awkwardness.

1Up.com gave the game an A−, saying that it was "unlike anything else on PS3. In fact, it's unlike anything else on any console system." GamePro gave it four stars out of five, saying that "when everything clicks just right, that click is deafening; a good match here is very, very good, and good matches show up just often enough at this early stage to make the rest worthwhile." GameZone gave it seven out of ten, calling it "an uneven and eventually tiring experience". However, Edge gave it six out of ten, saying, "With its robust clan support MAG still offers a cooperative experience on a rare scale for bands of dedicated players willing to weather the unnecessary confusions and ungenerous structure of the early game. For the rest, MAG rarely deals out the empowerment and clarity of purpose that other team shooters, like the forthcoming Battlefield: Bad Company 2, offer from the get go. It's not quite 'welcome to the suck', but gamers may wonder if MAG's a battle worth fighting."
