= First-person shooter =

Video game genre

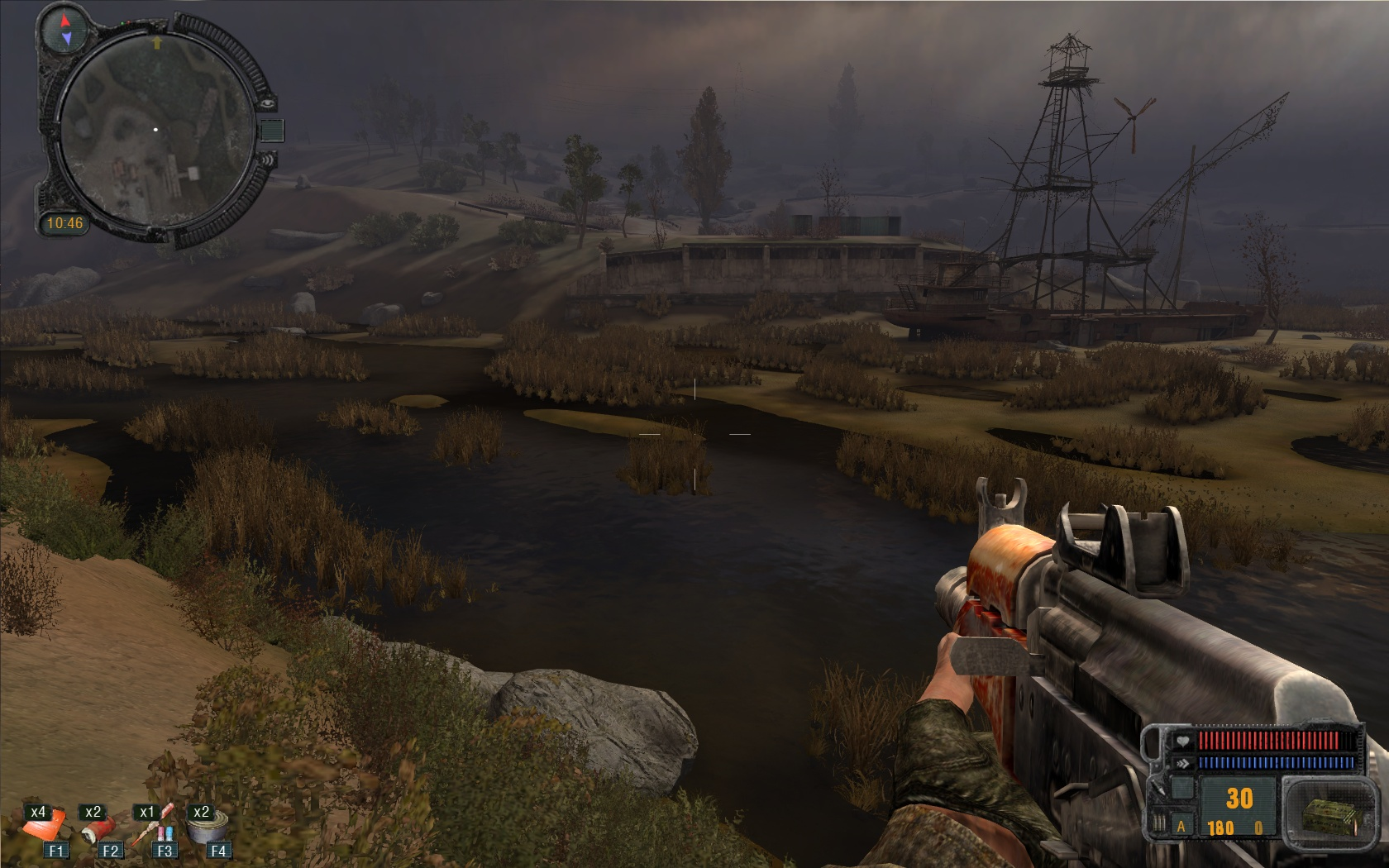
A player explores an area in S.T.A.L.K.E.R.: Call of Pripyat, with their equipped weapon visible in the bottom right of the first-person perspective

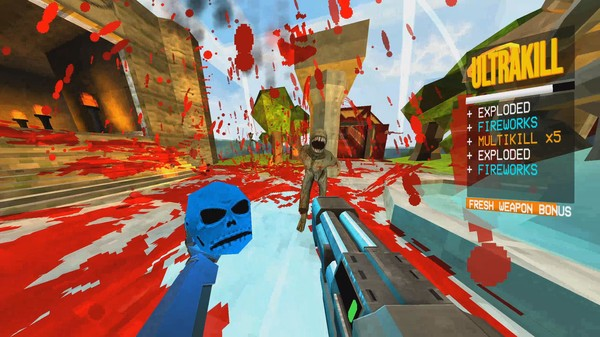
A fast-paced battle against multiple enemies in Ultrakill

A first-person shooter (FPS) is a video game genre focused on weapon-based combat seen from a first-person perspective, with the player experiencing the action directly through the eyes of the main character. This genre shares multiple common traits with other shooter games, and in turn falls under the action games category. Since the genre's inception, advanced 3D and pseudo-3D graphics have proven fundamental to allow a reasonable level of immersion in the game world, and this type of game helped to push technology progressively further, challenging hardware developers worldwide to introduce numerous innovations in the field of graphics processing units. Multiplayer gaming has been an integral part of the experience and became even more prominent with the diffusion of internet connectivity in recent years.

Wolfenstein 3D (1992) and Doom (1993) helped establish and popularize the modern first-person shooter, while later titles such as Quake, GoldenEye 007, and Halo contributed to advances in 3D graphics, multiplayer gameplay, and the genre's growth on consoles.

== Definition ==
First-person shooters are a type of shooter game that relies on a first-person point of view with which the player experiences the action through the eyes of the character. The primary design focus is combat, mainly involving firearms or other types of long range weapons. First-person shooters differ from third-person shooters in that, in a third-person shooter (including twin-stick shooters), the player can see the character they are controlling (usually from behind, or above), i.e., the game is played from a third-person perspective. (Note: To be sure, some shooters may offer different modes for first-person and third-person perspectives, such as PlayerUnknown's Battlegrounds and the Call of Duty series, some of whose zombies modes include a twin-stick mode, Dead Ops Arcade.)

A defining feature of the first-person shooter genre is "player-guided navigation through a three-dimensional space." This is a defining characteristic that clearly distinguishes the genre from other types of shooting games that employ a first-person perspective, including light gun shooters, rail shooters, shooting gallery games, or older shooting electro-mechanical games. First person-shooter games are thus categorized as being distinct from light gun shooters, a similar genre with a first-person perspective which uses dedicated light gun peripherals, in contrast to the use of conventional input devices. Light-gun shooters (like Virtua Cop) often feature "on-rails" (scripted) movement, whereas first-person shooters give the player complete freedom to roam the surroundings.

The first-person shooter may be considered a distinct genre itself, or a type of shooter game, in turn a subgenre of the wider action game genre. Following the release of Doom in 1993, games in this style were commonly referred to as "Doom clones"; over time this term has largely been replaced by "first-person shooter". Wolfenstein 3D, released in 1992, the year before Doom, has been often credited with introducing the genre, but critics have since identified similar, though less advanced, games developed as far back as 1973. There are occasional disagreements regarding the specific design elements which constitute a first-person shooter. For example, titles like Deus Ex or BioShock may be considered as first-person shooters, but may also fit into the role-playing games category, as they borrow extensively from that genre. Other examples, like Far Cry and Rage, could also be considered adventure games, because they focus more on exploration than simple action, they task players with multiple different objectives other than just killing enemies, and they often revolve around the construction of complex cinematic storylines with a well defined cast of secondary characters to interact with. Furthermore, certain puzzle or platforming games are also sometimes categorized as first-person shooters, in spite of lacking any direct combat or shooting element, instead using a first-person perspective to help players immerse within the game and better navigate 3D environments (for example, in the case of Portal, the 'gun' the player character carries is used to create portals through walls rather than fire projectiles). Some commentators also extend the definition to include combat flight simulators and space battle games, whenever the cockpit of the aircraft is depicted from a first-person point of view.

== Game design ==
A gameplay video of America's Army 3

Like most shooter games, first-person shooters involve an avatar, one or more ranged weapons, and a varying number of enemies. Because they take place in a 3D environment, these games tend to be somewhat more realistic than 2D shooter games, and have more accurate representations of gravity, lighting, sound and collisions. First-person shooters played on personal computers are most often controlled with a combination of a keyboard and mouse. This system has been claimed as superior to that found in console games, which frequently use two analog sticks: one used for running and sidestepping, the other for looking and aiming. It is common to display the character's hands and weaponry in the main view, with a heads-up display showing health, ammunition and location details. Often, it is possible to overlay a map of the surrounding area.

=== Combat and power-ups ===
First-person shooters generally focus on action gameplay, with fast-paced combat and dynamic firefights being a central point of the experience, though certain titles may also place a greater emphasis on narrative, problem-solving and logic puzzles. In addition to shooting, melee combat may also be used extensively. In some games, melee weapons are especially powerful, as a reward for the risk the player must take in maneuvering his character into close proximity to the enemy. In other games, instead, melee weapons may be less effective but necessary as a last resort. "Tactical shooters" tend to be more realistic, and require the players to use teamwork and strategy in order to succeed; the players can often command a squad of characters, which may be controlled by the A.I. or by human teammates, and can be given different tasks during the course of the mission.

First-person shooters typically present players with a vast arsenal of weapons, which can have a large impact on how they will approach the game. Some games offer realistic reproductions of actual existing (or even historical) firearms, simulating their rate of fire, magazine size, ammunition amount, recoil and accuracy. Depending on the context, other first-person shooters may incorporate some imaginative variations, including futuristic prototypes, alien-technology or magical weapons, and/or implementing a wide array of different projectiles, from lasers, to energy, plasma, rockets, and arrows. These many variations may also be applied to the tossing of grenades, bombs, spears and the like. Also, more unconventional modes of destruction may be employed by the playable character, such as flames, electricity, telekinesis or other supernatural powers, and traps.

In the early era of first-person shooters, often designers allowed characters to carry a large number of different weapons with little to no reduction in speed or mobility. More modern games started to adopt a more realistic approach, where the player can only equip a handheld gun, coupled with a rifle, or even limiting the players to only one weapon of choice at a time, forcing them to swap between different alternatives according to the situation. In some games, there is the option to trade up or upgrade weapons, resulting in multiple degrees of customization. Thus, the standards of realism are extremely variable. The protagonist can generally get healing and equipment supplies by means of collectible items such as first aid kits or ammunition packs, simply by walking over, or interacting with them. Some games allow players to accumulate experience points in a role-playing game fashion, that can generally be used to unlock new weapons, bonuses and skills.

=== Level design ===
First-person shooters may be structurally composed of levels, or use the technique of a continuous narrative in which the game never leaves the first-person perspective. Others feature large sandbox environments, which are not divided into levels and can be explored freely. In first-person shooters, protagonists interact with the environment to varying degrees, from basics such as using doors, to problem solving puzzles based on a variety of interactive objects. In some games, the player can damage the environment, also to varying degrees: one common device is the use of barrels containing explosive material which the player can shoot, harming nearby enemies. Other games feature environments which are extensively destructible, allowing for additional visual effects. The game world will often make use of science fiction, historic (particularly World War II) or modern military themes, with such antagonists as aliens, monsters, terrorists and soldiers of various types. Games feature multiple difficulty settings; in harder modes, enemies are tougher, more aggressive and do more damage, and power-ups are limited. In easier modes, the player can succeed through reaction times alone; on more difficult settings, it is often necessary to memorize the levels through trial and error.

=== Multiplayer ===
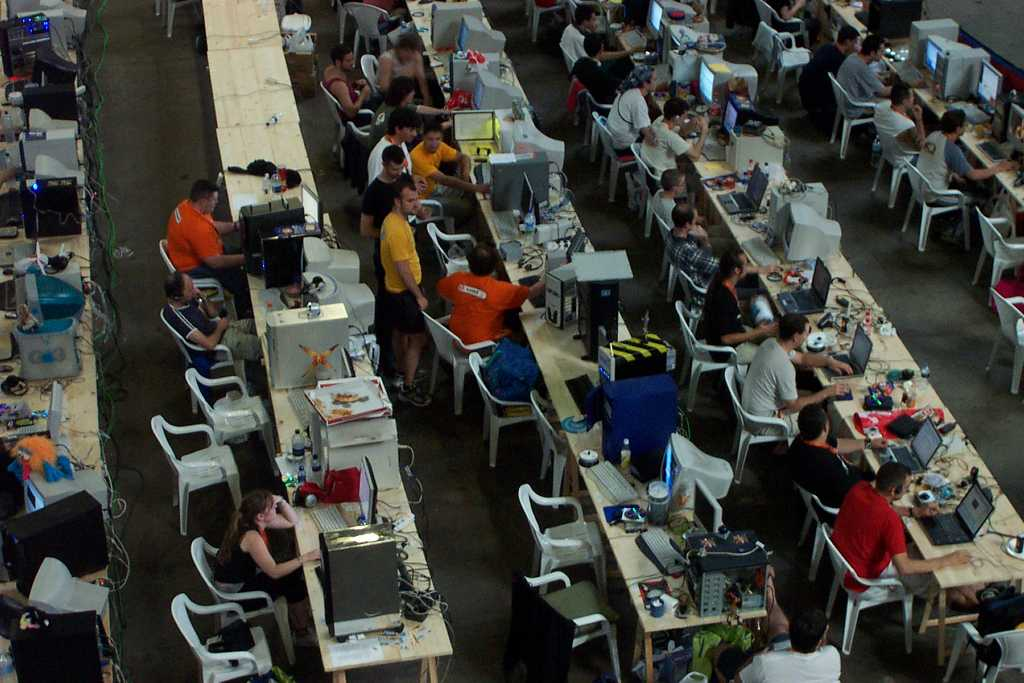
Local area networks were commonly used in early multiplayer games. Later games would use internet connections.

First-person shooters may feature a multiplayer mode, taking place on specialized levels. Some games are designed specifically for multiplayer gaming, and have very limited single player modes in which the player competes against game-controlled characters termed "bots". Massively multiplayer online first-person shooters like those in the PlanetSide series allow thousands of players to compete at once in a persistent world. Large scale multiplayer games allow multiple squads, with leaders issuing commands and a commander controlling the team's overall strategy. Multiplayer games have a variety of different styles of match.

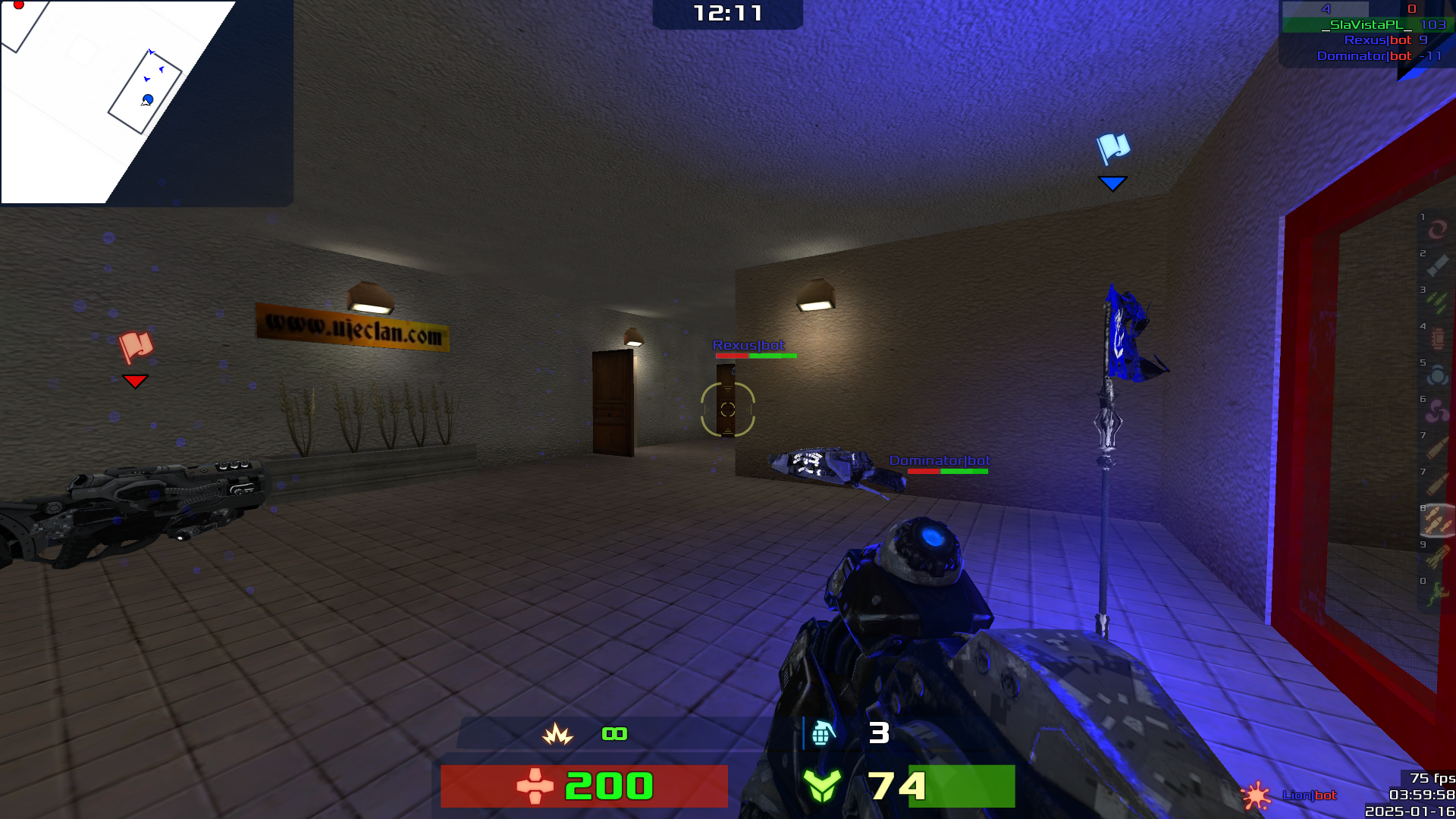
A player standing close to the blue flag in a "capture the flag" round of the 2023 game Xonotic

The classic types are the deathmatch (and its team-based variant) in which players score points by killing other players' characters; and capture the flag, in which teams attempt to penetrate the opposing base, capture a flag and return it to their own base whilst preventing the other team from doing the same. Other game modes may involve attempting to capture enemy bases or areas of the map, attempting to take hold of an object for as long as possible while evading other players, or deathmatch variations involving limited lives or in which players fight over a particularly potent power-up. These match types may also be customizable, allowing the players to vary weapons, health and power-ups found on the map, as well as victory criteria. Games may allow players to choose between various classes, each with its own strengths, weaknesses, equipment and roles within a team.

=== Free-to-play ===
There are many free-to-play first-person shooters on the market now, including Wolfenstein: Enemy Territory, Apex Legends, Team Fortress 2, PlanetSide 2, and Halo Infinite Multiplayer. Some games are released as free-to-play as their intended business model and can be highly profitable (League of Legends earned $2 billion in 2017), but others such as Warhammer 40,000: Eternal Crusade begin their life as paid games and become free-to-play later to reach a wider audience after an initially disappointing reception. Some player communities complain about freemium first-person-shooters, fearing that they create unbalanced games, but many game designers have tweaked prices in response to criticism, and players can usually get the same benefits by playing longer rather than paying.

== History ==
The origins of first-person shooters can be traced back to video games Maze War (1973) and Spasim (1974), which introduced multiplayer space shooting in a first-person perspective. Maze War, developed by high-school students in a NASA work-study program, later expanded to support artificial intelligence and customizable maps. Spasim was created on the PLATO system and allowed up to 32 players to explore a basic first-person space environment. Early action games such as Futurewar (1977) and Wayout (1982) advanced the genre by introducing ray casting, freer movement, and more realistic 3D perspectives. In 1980, Atari's arcade game Battlezone, became the first successful mass-market first-person shooter game.

In 1986, MacroMind released a version of the game for the Apple Macintosh titled Maze Wars+, which was playable on the AppleTalk local network by up to 30 players. The game featured five different character avatars, including an eyeball similar to that found in the Xerox version of the game, four different types of robot players, additional maze features such as teleporters, and walls made of lines rather than blocks. MIDI Maze, released in 1987 for the Atari ST, combined maze-based gameplay with a first-person perspective and introduced early network multiplayer deathmatches through a MIDI connection. Its multiplayer features earned it a cult following, while later versions such as Maze Wars+ expanded network play and added new characters and maze features. In 1991, id Software's Hovertank advanced the genre's technology through ray casting, allowing faster and smoother gameplay.

Wolfenstein 3D, developed by id Software, was released by Apogee Software in 1992. Inspired by the earlier Castle Wolfenstein games, it featured action through shootouts with Nazi enemies and boss battles, in maze-like environments filled with treasures and secret areas. The game also encouraged the growth of modding communities through its map editor, which inspired other games such as Pathways into Darkness and Blake Stone: Aliens of Gold. These games experimented with new features such as role-playing elements and auto-maps. Although Wolfenstein 3D was highly influential, id Software's release of Doom in 1993 soon surpassed it in popularity.

Doom, released in 1993, significantly improved upon Wolfenstein 3D by introducing higher-resolution graphics, better textures, lighting effects, and multiplayer deathmatches. Following Doom, games such as Heretic, Star Wars: Dark Forces, Descent, and Duke Nukem 3D expanded the genre with fully 3D movements, more advanced level design, and energetic humor. Quake, another id Software game, established fully 3D polygonal graphics, fast online multiplayer, and LAN parties.

The late 1990s marked several major milestones for the genre, with GoldenEye 007 (1997) introducing multiplayer console gameplay. Multiplayer continued to grow through games such as Quake III Arena, Unreal Tournament, and Counter-Strike, which established team-based competition. By the early 2000s, Halo helped make first-person gaming in consoles mainstream. The following decade then saw several FPS series and franchises become household names, garnering record-breaking sales with almost yearly releases, such as Call of Duty and Battlefield.

== Research ==
In 2010, researchers at Leiden University showed that playing first-person shooter video games is associated with superior mental flexibility. Compared to non-players, players of such games were found to require a significantly shorter reaction time while switching between complex tasks, possibly because they are required to develop a more responsive mindset to rapidly react to fast-moving visual and auditory stimuli, and to shift back and forth between different sub-duties.

== See also ==
- First-person shooter engine
- List of first-person shooters
- Video games listed among the best first-person shooters
- Social interaction and first-person shooters
- Violence and video games
