= Massively multiplayer online first-person shooter =

Video game genre

A massively multiplayer online first-person shooter (MMOFPS) is an online game which mixes the genres of first-person shooter and massively multiplayer online game. A MMOFPS is a real-time shooter experience where a very large number of players simultaneously interact with one another in a virtual world. These games provide large-scale, sometimes team-based combat.

However, due to the inherent fast-paced, strategic nature of this genre, players must rely on their physical coordination and cognition, as well as teamwork and coordination with other players. Thus, there is an emphasis towards player skill rather than player statistics, as no number of in-game bonuses, or similar, will compensate for a player's inability to aim and think tactically.

== Notable examples ==
World War II Online was released in 2001 and holds the Guinness World Record as the first MMOFPS. It was also awarded the Guinness World Record for largest non-instanced game map, at over 300,000 km^{2}.

MAG was released in 2010 for the PlayStation 3. The game featured a number of game modes and support for high player counts. MAG was awarded the Guinness World Record for most players online in a console FPS.

PlanetSide 2 was released in 2012 and is one of the largest and most successful MMOFPS. It holds the Guinness World Record for biggest first-person shooter battle; 1,158 players participated in a single battle to set the record in 2015. The game later beat its own record in 2020 with 1,283 players participating in one battle.

== See also ==
- List of massively multiplayer online first-person shooter games
- List of free massively multiplayer online games
- Virtual world
