= PlanetSide 2 =

2012 massively multiplayer online first-person shooter game

- Developers: Sony Online Entertainment; Rogue Planet Games; Toadman Interactive
- Composer: Jeff Broadbent (Note: Additional music by Don Ferrone)
- Series: PlanetSide
- Engine: ForgeLight
- Platforms: Microsoft Windows, PlayStation 4
- Release: Microsoft Windows; November 20, 2012; PlayStation 4; June 23, 2015
- Genre: Massively multiplayer online first-person shooter game
- Mode: Multiplayer

PlanetSide 2 is a free-to-play massively multiplayer online first-person shooter (MMOFPS) game originally developed by Sony Online Entertainment. The game supports battles with thousands of players and incorporates modern first-person shooter mechanics. Six infantry classes and multiple vehicles are available to players, allowing them to interact in combined arms warfare on the battlefield. PlanetSide 2 is a reimagining of PlanetSide and chronicles the efforts of the same three factions in their fight for control of the alien planet Auraxis.

Along with its prequel, PlanetSide 2 is one of very few MMOFPS games to have ever released, and is presently considered the most successful title in the genre. The ForgeLight proprietary game engine is used to support high concurrent player counts while retaining performance and graphical fidelity. PlanetSide 2 operates on a games as a service business model and is supported by microtransaction purchases. Since its launch, the game has received regular updates which have introduced new content and mechanics.

PlanetSide 2 received positive attention from critics for its scale, innovation, and graphics, but some reviewers were divided over the game's free-to-play business model, technical glitches, and difficulty for new players. PlanetSide 2 currently holds the Guinness World Record for "Most players in an online FPS battle," which was set in 2015 when 1,158 players were recorded in a single battle during a sponsored event. This record has since been unofficially beaten in both 2020 and 2022 when even higher player counts were recorded on the game's servers.

== Gameplay ==
NC infantry and tanks near a VS outpost

PlanetSide 2 is a first-person shooter which features several open world continents that are each 64 km^{2} and support up to 2,000 concurrent players. Upon creating a character, players are able to join either the New Conglomerate (NC), Terran Republic (TR), or Vanu Sovereignty (VS) faction. Each faction has a unique style, and offers access to different weapons and vehicles - for example, the Vanu Sovereignty have an alien aesthetic and employ advanced technologies in their arsenal. Members of each faction continually attempt to lock down continents by capturing and defending territories, earning global benefits for all allies if they manage to do so.

Players can choose between six infantry classes that each possess unique specialities. These range from the Infiltrator, a sniper class that has access to a cloaking device, to the MAX (Mechanized Assault Exo-Suit), an armored infantry unit that dual-wields heavy weaponry. Players can also operate several air and ground vehicles that serve transport, spawn point and combat roles. By killing enemies and capturing objectives, players earn currency (Certs) which can be used to unlock upgrades and new weapons for their preferred class or vehicle. Players can also use real-world money to purchase new items and weapons that are primarily cosmetic in nature and offer no direct benefit over non-paying individuals.

Compared to its predecessor, PlanetSide 2 is faster-paced, allowing players to teleport to the largest battles with the "Instant Action" gameplay mechanic. Modern first-person shooter elements such as sprinting, iron sights, and regenerating shields are also present. The game also emphasizes real-time strategy elements, featuring a command hierarchy system - 12 players can form a squad, and up to four squads (48 players) can associate and become a platoon. Each squad in a platoon has its own voice over IP channel which allows leaders to direct specific groups of players to different objectives. The squad system also promotes cohesion, allowing squad members to directly spawn onto each other with orbital drop pods.

== Plot ==
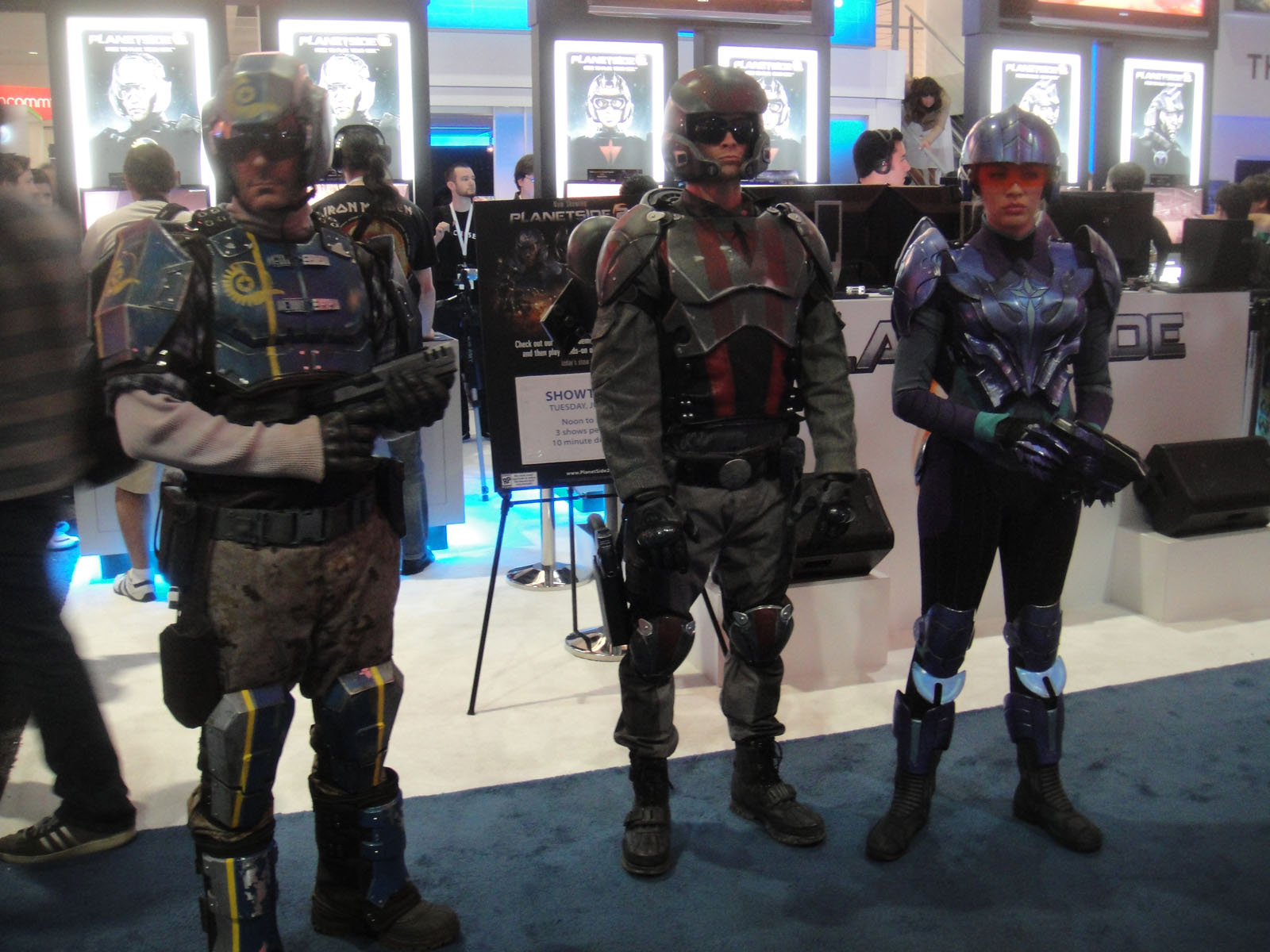
Left to right: NC, TR, and VS soldiers at the E3 2012 PlanetSide 2 showcase

In the year 2444, a mysterious wormhole forms over a war-torn Earth, and scientists report strange transmissions that all but confirm the existence of extraterrestrial life. The wormhole is predicted to re-open again in a century, and fear of a hostile, alien presence causes the global conflict to end. Nations around the world quickly agreed to a peace treaty and formed the Terran Republic, an authoritarian but benevolent United Nations-like organization that worked toward the peace and prosperity of humankind. As expected, the wormhole reopens after 100 years, but no further transmissions are detected; despite this, the Terran Republic remains in power, as the vast majority of humanity is satisfied with its governance.

Years later, explorer Thomas Connery discovers a segment of the Kuiper belt he dubs "the Moon Belt." Connery is voted into the position of Terran Republic president soon after. Suspecting the discovery of alien technology, multiple business leaders form the New Conglomerate, a libertarian organization seeking to capitalize on the discovery and free themselves from strict Terran Republic control. After his retirement, Connery recruits eccentric xenobiologist Henry Briggs for a second expedition to the Moon Belt, and the pair discovers an alien figurine. Upon touching the artifact, Briggs experiences a revelation and is left with a single message: "Vanu."

The wormhole appears yet again in 2640, and this time Connery leads an expedition consisting of Terran Republic officers, New Conglomerate representatives, and scientists seeking extraterrestrial knowledge. The wormhole collapses before the entire fleet is able to pass through, however, 40,000 individuals are trapped on the other side, unable to return to Earth. Months pass, and as chances for survival become increasingly bleak, New Conglomerate insurgents begin launching attacks against Terran Republic forces, killing Connery in the process. In response, draconian laws are forced upon all passengers by the Terran Republic. The scientists onboard, led by Briggs, begin to distance themselves from both sides of the conflict.

Finally, the hospitable moon of a gas giant, named "New Earth" (later renamed Auraxis), is located by researchers aboard the ships. Upon arrival, the human survivors begin to terraform and colonize Auraxis. The New Conglomerate and Terran Republic break off from each other, and no major conflicts occur between the two sides for the next two centuries. Despite this, tensions continue to rise between the two groups, culminating in a declaration of all-out war after conflicting reports of a violent attack. A group of dedicated scientists, inspired by Briggs' revelation and Vanu artifacts discovered on Auraxis, announce they can no longer remain neutral and declare themselves the Vanu Sovereignty.

Soon after the beginning of the war, rebirthing technology was developed, granting immortality to soldiers of all three empires. Through the use of nanites, each faction is able to rapidly produce vehicles, weapons, and other equipment for use in combat. With effectively unlimited resources available to each side, Auraxis has remained in unending turmoil, with no end in sight to the conflict.

== Development ==
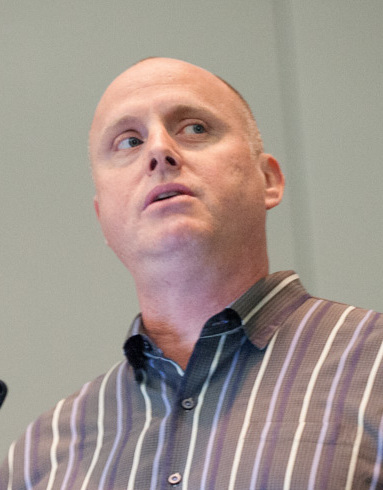
Sony Online Entertainment president John Smedley was heavily involved in development.

The first indications of a potential PlanetSide sequel appeared in September 2009, when Sony Online Entertainment (SOE) e-mailed PlanetSide subscribers with a survey asking for suggestions regarding the next installment of the series. On October 11, SOE president John Smedley posted on his LiveJournal account, revealing that the sequel's working title was PlanetSide Next. In December 2010, Smedley announced that SOE would be launching a first-person shooter in March 2011, hinting that the release would be PlanetSide Next; this was soon confirmed by Paul Williams of SOE.

Vehicle designs for PlanetSide Next, including those of the Galaxy aircraft and a New Conglomerate tank, were teased in early 2011 by Smedley. On March 31, 2011, SOE announced that it would be ending development of their spy-themed MMO The Agency and refocusing efforts on both EverQuest Next and PlanetSide Next following their closure of three game studios. Shortly after, Smedley announced that PlanetSide Next had been delayed as a result of switching to an entirely new engine, and would be made available later than initially anticipated.

At the SOE Fan Faire event in July 2011, Smedley revealed that PlanetSide Next had originally been planned as a graphical update to the original game that would have transitioned it to a free-to-play business model, but eventually the development team decided to pursue a full-fledged sequel titled PlanetSide 2. Smedley announced that both PlanetSide 2 and EverQuest Next would be using SOE's proprietary ForgeLight engine to support seamless worlds and realistic physics using Nvidia's PhysX API. Rather than a direct sequel, the game was revealed to be a reimagining of PlanetSide with faster-paced first-person shooter mechanics, "triple-A" graphics, and a greater focus on capturing and defending territories. SOE announced later in 2011 that comic book writer Marv Wolfman would be authoring episodic stories to establish the game's background and expand upon PlanetSide's original backstory.

Throughout the game's development, John Smedley and creative director Matt Higby have cited Eve Online as well as both the Call of Duty and Battlefield series as major influences for PlanetSide 2. Smedley, an active Eve Online player himself, took inspiration from the game's sandbox-like freedom, resource management, offline progression system and its ability to support a high number of players on one server. Higby has specifically named the vehicle combat mechanics of Battlefield: Bad Company 2 as a major influence, stating that the game had "done the best with vehicles. I want [PlanetSide 2] to be at least that good."

During the 2012 Game Developers Conference, a playable in-development version of PlanetSide 2 was showcased by SOE. Early versions of the game's environment, vehicles, and character progression system were demonstrated, and it was also announced that the game would be free to play. Smedley announced that a closed beta test would begin July 30 or 31 2012 "barring any unforeseen circumstances." On July 30 Smedley announced that the beta testing would be delayed until at least August 3 "to make sure some stuff is awesome." On August 2, Smedley mentioned during a Reddit AMA that a Mac version was planned post-launch, writing: "No you aren't going to see PlanetSide 2 on Linux. You will see it on Mac though". On August 3, Smedley announced that the closed Beta would commence 2pm PDT (GMT-7) Monday 6 August. The beta closed on November 17, 2012, pending the game's official release November 20, 2012.

=== PlayStation 4 port ===
Early in the game's development, the ownership of PlanetSide 2 by a subsidiary of Sony Interactive Entertainment led some to speculation regarding a release for PlayStation branded consoles. Smedley hinted at the possibility of a release for the PlayStation 3 throughout 2011 and 2012.

The success of free-to-play games like PlanetSide 2 led Sony to announce that the PlayStation 4 would support free-to-play titles in addition to retail games. On June 5, 2013, SOE announced that both PlanetSide 2 and DC Universe Online would be available to play on the PlayStation 4 later in 2013. It was also announced that a PlayStation Plus subscription would not be required to play the game. The developers planned for the games to be as similar as possible between the PC and PlayStation 4 releases aside from a different UI and support for DualShock 4 controllers, and said that console graphics would match the "Ultra" preset on PC. Cross-platform play between the PlayStation 4 and PC versions of the game would not be possible due to update delays, but the ability to transfer player accounts between the two platforms would be considered. Creative director Matt Higby also mentioned the possibility of porting PlanetSide 2's mobile app to the PlayStation Vita with additional interactive features.

In October 2013, Smedley confirmed that the game's PlayStation 4 release date had been pushed to 2014, but did not provide a reason for the delay. In January 2014, Smedley stated that the game's release was targeted for the first half of the year. Higby confirmed that the game would run at 1080p resolution with a high frame rate in May 2014, and a picture of an in-development version of the game was tweeted by the game's PlayStation 4 producer Clint Worley. Throughout development, the ForgeLight engine was modified to better support multithreading to better use the PlayStation 4's processing power, which improved PC performance as well. More information was revealed at E3 2014 - lead designer Luke Sigmund stated that the game would run between 30 and 60 frames per second, and a new launch trailer was showcased.

SOE stated that a beta for the game be arriving by the end of the year in November 2014, and beta signups opened in December 2014. The beta for the PlayStation 4 version opened on January 20, 2015. The game was officially released on June 23, 2015.

=== Post-release ===
During the 2013 Game Developers Conference, more PlanetSide 2 features were unveiled. A companion app for iOS and Android devices in development would allow players to view guides, use the in-game voice chat, track their character, and see a real-time PlanetSide 2 world map. Future updates to the app would allow users to affect battles by launching "drone strikes or orbital strikes" according to senior art director Tramell Isaac. The app was released in April 2013.

In 2019, PlanetSide 2 was upgraded to use DirectX 11, while it had previously been using DirectX 9. The upgrade would provide significant improvements to performance, enable better support for modern hardware and allow future optimiziations according to producer Nick Silva.

In 2021, Valve Software announced that Linux support for PlanetSide 2 was enabled using their Proton compatibility layer, which had not been possible prior to support from the game's anti-cheat service, BattlEye.

== Business model ==
[Paying customers] won't suddenly have a super tank that lets them crush all the puny free player tanks, their success on the battlefield is still entirely player skill based, they'll just be less impacted for re-deploying to the battlefield. That is a huge benefit, no denying it. Is that 'buying power'? Well, that depends on your definition.

— Matt Higby

PlanetSide 2 is free-to-play and includes microtransactions that allow players to purchase in-game convenience items and cosmetics. The game also offers a monthly subscription that provides cash shop discounts, an XP multiplier, and increased resource generation. Although guns and cosmetics can be directly purchased with the game's premium currency, upgrades that grant direct advantages can only be unlocked through gameplay.

The game's developers have indicated an admiration of the freemium business model presented in League of Legends. During PlanetSide 2's development, SOE president John Smedley said the game would "not sell a more powerful gun or vehicle," with purchases using real-life money being only an alternative to unlocking items through gameplay. In 2012, creative director Matt Higby elaborated on PlanetSide 2's business model, stating that "no weapon, vehicle, attachment, continent, class or certification" would be inaccessible by free-to-play characters post-launch.

In 2017, Implants were released, which were time-limited perks obtained through loot boxes purchasable with in-game currency and Daybreak Cash. The system was initially received negatively by players due to perceived unfairness, leading the development team to entirely redesign the feature.

Players are able to create cosmetic items (such as helmets, armors, and decals) for the game with the Player Studio, a revenue sharing program where the creator of the item is paid each time their in-game item is purchased. Some participants have earned thousands of dollars from their creations.

== Release ==
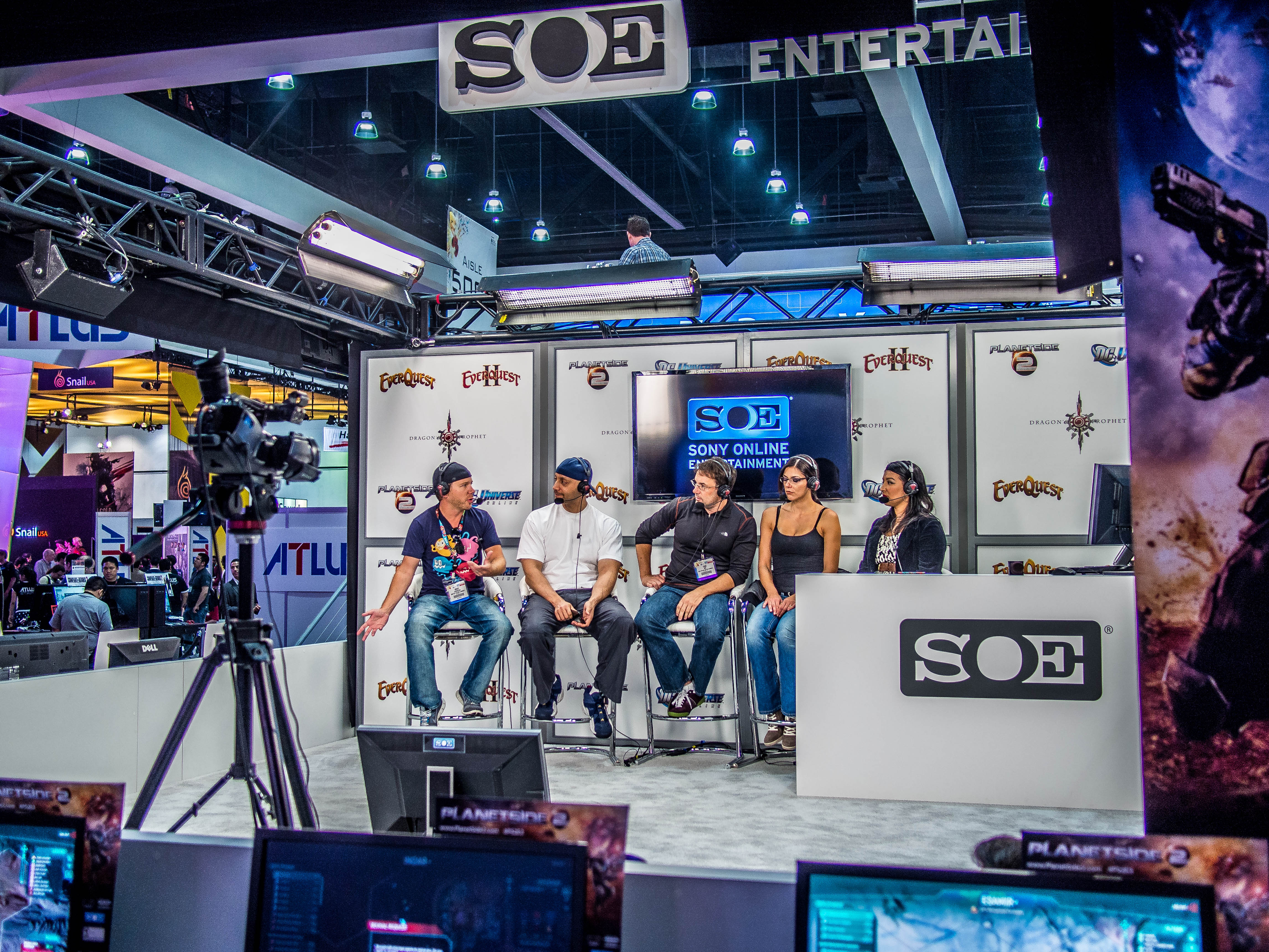
PlanetSide 2 showcase and developer panel at E3 2013

PlanetSide 2 launched on November 20, 2012. The PlayStation 4 version of PlanetSide 2 officially released on June 23, 2015.

Multiple localizations of PlanetSide 2 have been published internationally. The game was published in Europe by ProSiebenSat.1 Games, and a retail version of the game with special bonuses was released in 2013 by ProSiebenSat.1 and Koch Media. ProSiebenSat.1 ended their partnership with SOE in 2014 and allowed players to transfer their progress to SOE starting July 1, 2014. A localization for Russia and the Commonwealth of Independent States was published by Innova.

A version of the game localized for China was released in June 2013 by The9, and had higher initial player counts than the US servers according to SOE president John Smedley. The Chinese release was shut down on May 31, 2016 by The9 to focus their efforts on the release of Firefall. A localized version of PlanetSide 2 was published in South Korea in 2014 as part of SOE's partnership with Daum Communications. Due to incompatibilities with the game's cash shop and low player counts, the Korean service shut down in 2015.

=== Promotion ===
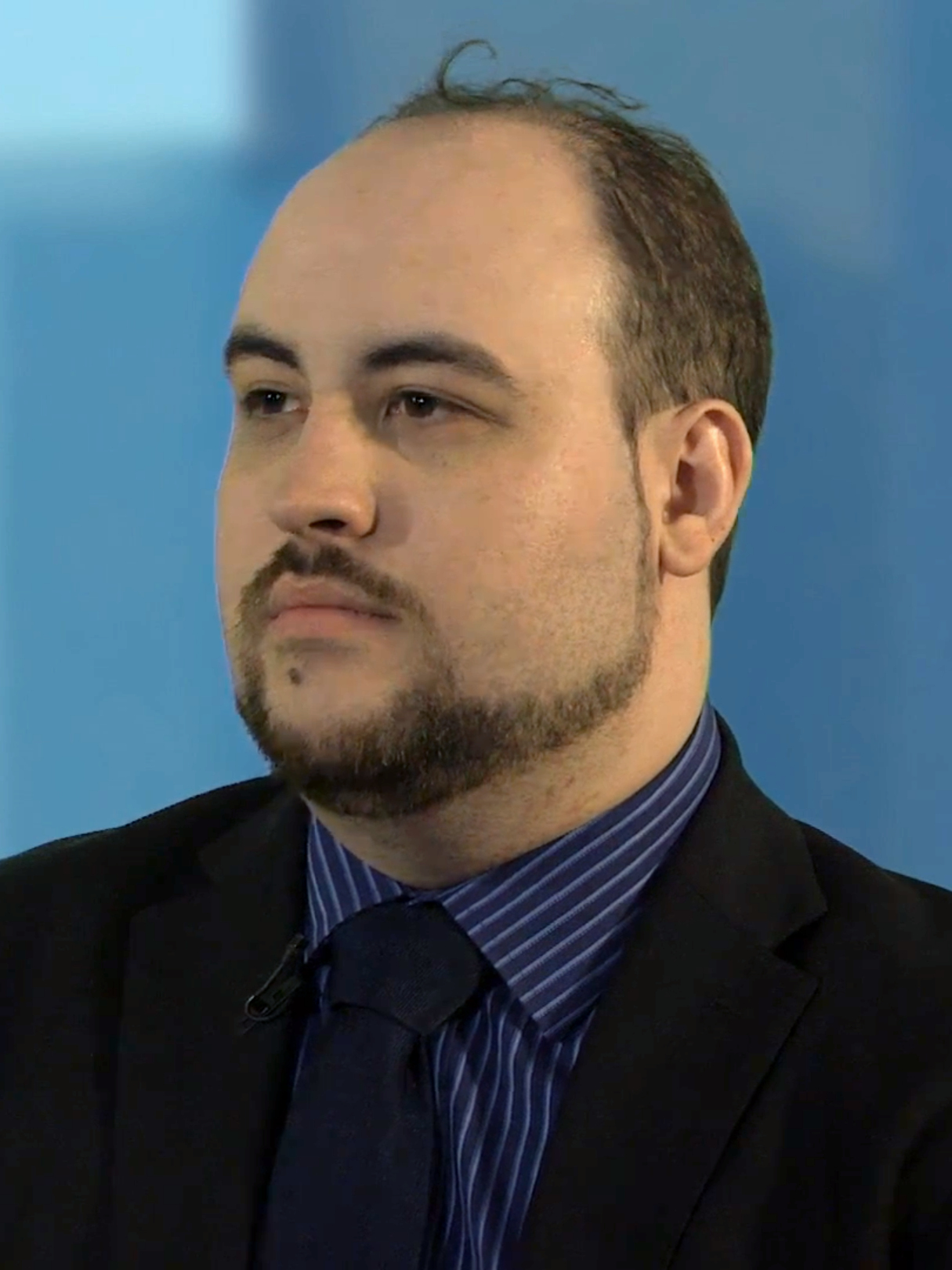
TotalBiscuit (John Bain) promoted PlanetSide 2 and covered its development stages.

Prior to the game's launch in 2012, demos of PlanetSide 2 were showcased at numerous gaming conventions which included San Diego Comic-Con, ChinaJoy, PAX Prime, Gamescom, the Game Developers Conference, E3 2012, and SOE Live. The official cinematic trailer for the game produced by Blur Studio titled "Death is No Excuse" was unveiled at ChinaJoy.

Shortly after PlanetSide 2's official release, SOE partnered with Internet personalities TotalBiscuit (John Bain), SeaNanners (Adam Montoya), and Tobuscus (Toby Turner, later replaced by LevelCap Gaming) for the "Ultimate Empire Showdown", an event where each YouTuber represented one of the game's factions. Bain, a long-time PlanetSide fan, had begun working with SOE to promote PlanetSide 2 before the game's release and hosted a live showcase of the game during E3 2012. Bain was allowed access to the game during its development stages and regularly livestreamed early gameplay with the developers.

A partnership was established with Wikia to create the first ever "Wikia Official Community," providing exclusive content and support for the game's wiki. SOE also partnered with esports organization Major League Gaming to establish PlanetSide 2 as a competitive video game. The game was featured at MLG's Winter Championship Pro Circuit event in 2013, and both the event and additional programming were broadcast on MLG's own network and Twitch.

PlanetSide 2 was also showcased at E3 2013. In 2014, the PlayStation 4 release of the game was showcased at PAX Prime and E3 2014.

=== World record ===
On January 24, 2015, PlanetSide 2 broke the Guinness World Record for "Most players in an online FPS battle" when 1,158 players simultaneously took part in a fight. The event was organized by SOE and community organization PlanetSide Battles, and took place on the game's Jaeger competitive server. The record had been previously held by Man vs. Machine, a browser-based first person shooter.

In 2020, the record was beat unofficially when 1,283 players participated in a single battle. While the 2015 record had been set as part of a sponsored event, the new record resulted from a player surge driven by the "Escalation" update and global COVID-19 lockdowns.

The world record was beaten yet again multiple times in 2022 as part of the game's 10th anniversary celebration. A peak of 1,530 players was recorded on a single continent prior to a server crash, with the highest stable player count reaching 1,241.

Even larger unrecorded battles have occurred throughout the game's lifespan, with upwards of 1,200 players fighting at a single location during special events. Writing for Eurogamer, Rick Lane estimated that anywhere between 7,000 and 28,000 players could have participated at the same conflict simultaneously during the "Battle for the Bastion," a cross-server event.

== Reception ==
Reception

Aggregate score
Aggregator	Score
Metacritic	(PC) 84/100 (PS4) 78/100

Review scores
Publication	Score
Destructoid	7.5/10
Eurogamer	9/10
Game Informer	7.75/10
GameRevolution	7/10
GameSpot	9/10
GameSpy	9/10
GamesRadar+	9/10
GameTrailers	8.7/10
IGN	9/10
PC PowerPlay	9/10
Polygon	7.5/10

PlanetSide 2 received "generally favorable reviews" from critics, according to review aggregator website Metacritic.

Critics praised the large scale battles, impressive graphics and free-to-play model. Charles Onyett of IGN gave the game a score of 9/10, writing that the combined arms warfare of PlanetSide 2 is "often breathtaking, as lines of tanks fire at bases while aircraft light up the sky and hundreds of players fill the scene with healing beams and lethal weapons fire." Onyett also praised the game's "versatile classes, deep progression systems and various styles of air and ground vehicles," but noted "some polish issues" and small glitches present in the game. Writing for GameSpot, Tyler Hicks held the same opinion, writing that "the massive scale of battles to the detail put into the sprawling continents" allowed the game to "[surpass] its predecessor in nearly every regard," but similarly noticed small issues with "population disadvantages or the occasional crash." In his review, Craig Pearson of GameSpy praised the game's "gorgeous lighting and huge draw distances" and "intense, multiplayer battles," but noted that the game's leadership and coordination aspects could use improvement. Richard Cobbett of Eurogamer enjoyed the game's "epic scale," and regarded the game as "not quite the best of both worlds, but certainly the best attempt anyone has ever made to fuse [an MMO and FPS] together."

Patrick Hancock of Destructoid found issue with the game's business model and need for grinding, writing that PlanetSide 2 is a "wonderful game, hampered by the fact that it's free-to-play." Hancock noted that the game "doesn't do a great job of explaining the many systems at play" and criticized the lack of long-term goals for a player to achieve. Though Griffin McElroy of Polygon praised PlanetSide 2's gameplay and scale, they noted that, for microtransactions, "prices escalate quickly" and that the amount of time needed to unlock a single item with in-game currency could be "excessive." Jonathan Leack of GameRevolution noted frequent glitches, with "people teleporting and rubber-banding," which led the game to feel like a "rushed job" at times.

The PlayStation 4 release of the game received similarly positive attention from critics. Multiple reviewers found an increase in technical bugs. Jeff Marchiafava of Game Informer praised the game's player progression speed and "solid" gameplay, but found that the game can feel like it "lacks a point" and noted that its "technical implementation [was] far from perfect." Likewise, Kevin VanOrd of GameSpot praised the game's "fantastic massive battles" but found that its enjoyment "rests on how forgiving you are of technical hiccups you would properly expect to be vanquished."

=== Awards ===
PlanetSide 2 won several awards from video game publications at E3 2012. IGN awarded it "Best MMO Game"; GameSpy awarded it "Best Shooter", "Best Free-to-Play" and "Best PC Exclusive"; Digital Trends awarded it "Best MMO"; Polygon awarded it "Editor's Choice"; and from PC Gamer, "Best Shooter", "Best MMO", "Best of Show" and "Most Awards Received". The game received numerous other awards and nominations as well.
