= 1995 in games =

This page lists board and card games, wargames, miniatures games, and tabletop role-playing games published in 1995. For video games, see 1995 in video gaming.

== Games released or invented in 1995 ==
- Across Suez (second, updated version)
- Advanced Tracks to Telluride
- Battlelords
- Blood Wars Card Game
- BrikWars
- Cluedo Super Sleuth
- Dark Seed II
- Doomtrooper
- Dragon Dice
- El Grande
- Empire of the Rising Sun
- Everway
- The Great Dalmuti
- Guardians (card game) (collectible card game)
- Highlander: The Card Game
- Jenga Ultimate
- Legends of the Five Rings Collectible Card Game
- Medici
- Middle-earth Collectible Card Game
- Mortal Kombat Kard Game
- Murphy's World (role-playing game)
- Necromunda
- Nightbane (role-playing game)
- OverPower card game
- Quest for the Grail
- Rage (collectible card game)
- Redemption card game
- RoboRally - Armed and Dangerous
- The Settlers of Catan
- Shadowfist (collectible card game)
- Sim City The Card Game
- Simply Cosmic
- Star Wars Customizable Card Game
- Tempest of the Gods
- Towers in Time
- Ultimate Combat! (collectible card game)
- Vampire: The Eternal Struggle (earlier known as Jyhad)
- Warzone - A Fast & Furious Miniatures Battle Game
- WildStorms: The Expandable Super-Hero Card Game
- Wing Commander Collectible Trading Card Game
- Wyvern

== Game awards given in 1995 ==
- Spiel des Jahres: The Settlers of Catan
- Games: Sharp Shooters

== Deaths ==
Date	Name	Age	Notability
February 19	Nigel Findley	35	RPG designer and author

== See also ==
- 1995 in video gaming
