= GU Comics =

2000s webcomic by William Hearn

- Author: Woody Hearn
- Website: http://www.gucomics.com/
- Current status/schedule: Hiatus/discontinued
- Launch date: 2000-07-10
- Genre: Gaming

GU Comics is a single panel webcomic written, drawn, and colored by William "Woody" Hearn. Established July 10, 2000 and launched August 15, 2000, GU is published, free, five times a week on its own web site. The comic focuses on a single video game such as World of Warcraft, but it also comments on gaming industry and community news, often lampooning gamers in general through the adventures of Hearn and his fictional roommate, Ted, and occasionally parodies contemporary social, political, and personal issues related to the online and general video game world. In recent months Hearn has focused primarily on writing comics revolving around various pen-and-paper role playing games; it is unclear if Hearns actually takes part in these games or if he simply finds humor in D&D sourcebooks over PC MMO games.

== History ==
Launch - GU Comics was first released to a small group of friends on July 10, 2000. Then known as "/gu ...", the original comics were set inside the MMOG fantasy world of EverQuest and centered on the in-game antics of the artist and members of his guild (Purifying Light on Vallon Zek). Intended only as a hobby, the comic's link was passed around to various EverQuest related community sites (Evercrest.Com being chief among them). On July 25, GU was contacted by the GameFan/Game Answer Network with an offer of affiliation and a proposal to go "live". Now hosted on the GameFan/Game Answer Network, GU was released for wide public consumption August 15, 2000. The response was swift and significant. Since its inception GU has change hosts for various reasons. February 4, 2003, GU moved to TheSafehouse.org.

The Safehouse - On February 5, 2003, signifying the move to the Safehouse and a shift in interest to the wider gaming world rather than focusing specifically on EverQuest, the slash and ellipses were officially dropped from the GU logo. As of April 9, 2007 the format of the comic was shifted from 300x465 to 600x450. Along with the format shift the logo, and comic type sub-text was removed from the strip.

SOE Boycott - In May 2004, GU Comics became the center of attention when Woody Hearn posted a comic satirizing the Omens of War expansion for Everquest. In the attendant forum writeup, he called for a boycott by EverQuest players against the Omens of War expansion in an effort to force Sony Online Entertainment, who produces EverQuest, to correct the numerous issues players had with the game rather than release another expansion so quickly on the heels of the previous one. The call to boycott was rescinded after SOE held a summit to address player concerns, improve (internal and external) communication, and begin correcting issues within the game.

Going Digital - Beginning March 17th, 2008 panels were still hand drawn, but were being inked digitally. As of April 3rd, 2008 GU Comics has moved to full digital production eliminating the paper waste associated with sketching and inking the comics on card stock.

== Public Appearances ==
GU Comics had featured costume contests for its readers for Halloween, unofficial gatherings at various conventions and gaming trade shows. In addition, Hearn had been invited to review the development of and write NDA-approved pieces about various games, including Vanguard: Saga of Heroes. GU Comics has been featured in many online webzines and print media, including Gamespy, Joystiq, GamePolitics.com, MMORPG.Com, MMORPGamer, Computer Games Magazine, Der Spielekurier, and the film Avatars Offline (as Woody Hearn). Several GUComics relevant to World of Warcraft were referenced in the official Community News of World of Warcraft Europe.

Hearn has been invited to visit the studios of Sony Online Entertainment, Sigil Games, Mythic Entertainment, 38 Studios, NetDevil and Blizzard Entertainment, was a yearly press attendee at E3, was invited as a guest of honor to Blizzard Entertainment's BlizzCon to serve on a panel with the creators of Penny Arcade and PvP, and is a yearly participant/guest of honor ConnectiCon.
