= Keith Parkinson =

American artist (1958–2005)

- Keith Parkinson
- Born: Keith A. Parkinson; October 22, 1958; West Covina, California, U.S.
- Died: October 26, 2005 (aged 47); San Diego, California, U.S.
- Resting place: Mission San Luis Rey Cemetery
- Known for: Fantasy art
- Spouse: Donna

Keith A. Parkinson (October 22, 1958 – October 26, 2005) was an American fantasy artist and illustrator known for book covers and artwork for games such as EverQuest, Guardians, Magic: The Gathering, and Vanguard: Saga of Heroes. After designing book and magazine covers for TSR, Parkinson moved into game design in the 1990s, and co-designed the collectible card game Guardians. Parkinson died of leukemia on October 26, 2005.

== Early life ==
Keith Parkinson was born in West Covina, California. Because of his father's career at GMAC, Parkinson spent his childhood in various cities in the United States including San Diego, CA, New York, NY, Miami, Florida, and Lansing, Michigan. From an early age, Parkinson took an interest in science fiction, particularly in spaceships, and used his artistic abilities to explore his interest. However, by the age of twelve, he became more interested in music than art; in an interview he stated, "I got involved with a rock & roll band in high school, and played semi-professionally all the way through high school and into college. For several years, my band toured on weekends. We were into heavy metal and played stuff by Blue Öyster Cult, Rush, Led Zeppelin, and other heavy metal monster groups." At one gig, Parkinson met his future wife, Mary, who later became the Dragon Magazine Advertising Coordinator.

== Career ==
=== Art and illustration ===
Parkinson graduated from Kendall College of Art and Design in 1980. His first job was with a company called Advertising Posters, where he worked on the artwork for pinball games and early arcade games, including Tron and Krull. Parkinson was heavily influenced by Frank Frazetta and Roger Dean in his own fantasy work. At Advertising Posters, Parkinson was introduced to Dungeons & Dragons by a coworker. Parkinson recalls, "The first night I played a ranger in B1 [sic], Keep on the Borderlands, and I was hooked. We played every week."

In November 1982, he went to work at TSR, Inc.: "I didn't like a lot of the art I saw on D&D game products, and the company was in Lake Geneva, Wisconsin, just over the border, so I drove up one day to see if I could do some freelance work. Elmore, Jeff Easley, and Tim Truman had all just joined the company, and the art they were working on was fantastic. It really blew my mind. Jim Roslof, who was the Art Director, hinted that I could join the staff full-time, but I missed the hint. A few days later, I called him about a job, and he had just hired somebody else the day before, but he'd keep me in mind. The next day, he called back, and had an opening.” Parkinson also worked on projects including book covers, game boxes, magazines and calendars. Among his book covers are such titles as Star Frontiers, Forgotten Realms and Gamma World. He is also known for his Dragonlance art.

After five years working at TSR, Parkinson left and pursued a freelance career for seven years. During this time, most of Parkinson's work was painting covers for the New York publishing market. His clients included Bantam Books, Palladium Books, Penguin Books, and Random House. Some of the authors that he painted covers for include Terry Goodkind, Margaret Weis, Tracy Hickman, Terry Brooks, and David Eddings.

During the 1990s, Parkinson created many of the book covers for the multi-genre role-playing game Rifts and its supplements.

=== Game design and books ===
In 1995, Parkinson's first attempt at game design, Guardians, was published by Friedlander Publishing Group (FPG), which also published Parkinson's first book, titled Knightsbridge: The Art of Keith Parkinson. He published two more books of his artwork: a sketchbook, Spellbound, and a second full-color artbook, King's Gate. Other works from this time include a set of art trading cards and a screensaver produced by Second Nature Software.

In 2000, Parkinson devoted more of his time to writing and shifted his commercial art to the game industry. He produced art for THQ's Summoner and painted the well-known artwork for the original EverQuest as well as its first three expansion packs. In painting the box art, he also created the character Firiona Vie, who has adorned the cover of almost every expansion since.

Parkinson was hired as the art director and co-founder of Sigil Games Online, and worked there on the MMORPG Vanguard: Saga of Heroes until his death in late 2005. Although Parkinson became ill before he could create the box art for Vanguard: Saga of Heroes, he did create the game's three 'mascot' characters: Jeric, Eila, and Idara. According to Brad McQuaid, when Parkinson knew he could not finish the box art for Vanguard, he hoped that his friend Donato Giancola would complete it. The left side of Donato's painting emulated Parkinson's personal style, as a tribute to him (the left was used for the box art, similar to EverQuest). Moving to the right, the painting transitions into Giancola's style. As a further tribute to Keith Parkinson, Giancola put a character resembling him into the painting.

== Reception ==
In his 2023 book Monsters, Aliens, and Holes in the Ground, RPG historian Stu Horvath reviewed the role-playing game Rifts and commented, "[Rifts] should be a mess, but the art holds it all together. Keith Parkinson, an iconic '80s D&D mainstay, delivered many of the best covers for Rifts books, including the core rulebooks, and it is gratifying to see the game's weirdness fuel the artist's expansive vision. His cover for World Book 16: Federation of Magic (1997) exemplifies how Rifts pushed his art well beyond the fantasy standards of D&D.

== Death ==
After a long battle with acute myelogenous leukemia (AML), Keith Parkinson died on 26 October 2005. He was survived by his wife, Donna, and two sons. Parkinson was described by his friends and colleagues (and in the eulogy by Brad McQuaid) as having had a true passion for his work, as well as having a friendly and positive demeanor until his death. A small graveside funeral was held at Mission San Luis Rey de Francia led by Vicar David Smith of Faith Lutheran Church in Vista, California.

== Awards, honors, and tributes ==
In 2002, Parkinson was nominated for a Chesley Award from the ASFA, for Best Product Illustration, for his work on Shadows of Luclin.

After his death, an art expo called "The Masters of Fantasy Art—A Tribute to Keith Parkinson" went on tour from February to July 2007. Laura Naviaux, Senior Brand Manager for Sony Online Entertainment, explained: "Our goal for 'The Masters of Fantasy Art' tour is to highlight the artistry that is integral to the creation of video games, as well as the influences of classical art on the industry as a whole. By showcasing Keith Parkinson's work on the new Vanguard: Saga of Heroes online videogame and joining up with The Art Institute, we hope to raise the public's awareness of computer and graphical arts as a discipline."

In August and September 2008, Parkinson's alma mater Kendall College of Art and Design at Ferris State University, honored him and his TSR contemporaries Larry Elmore and Jeff Easley with a gallery exhibit called "Out of the Dungeons". Director of Exhibitions Sarah Joseph stated, "We wanted to honor Parkinson [...] It seemed fitting to include Elmore and Easley, since all three of them worked together for a number of years."

In 2014, Scott Taylor of Black Gate, named Keith Parkinson as #7 in a list of The Top 10 RPG Artists of the Past 40 Years, saying "He was never one that got Elmore or Easley props, but he had a style that he continued to evolve and hone until it turned from very, very good into simply outstanding. He was lost too soon to the industry and yet his legacy is something many artists have used to try to model their own careers."
