= Mark Poole =

American fantasy artist (born 1963)

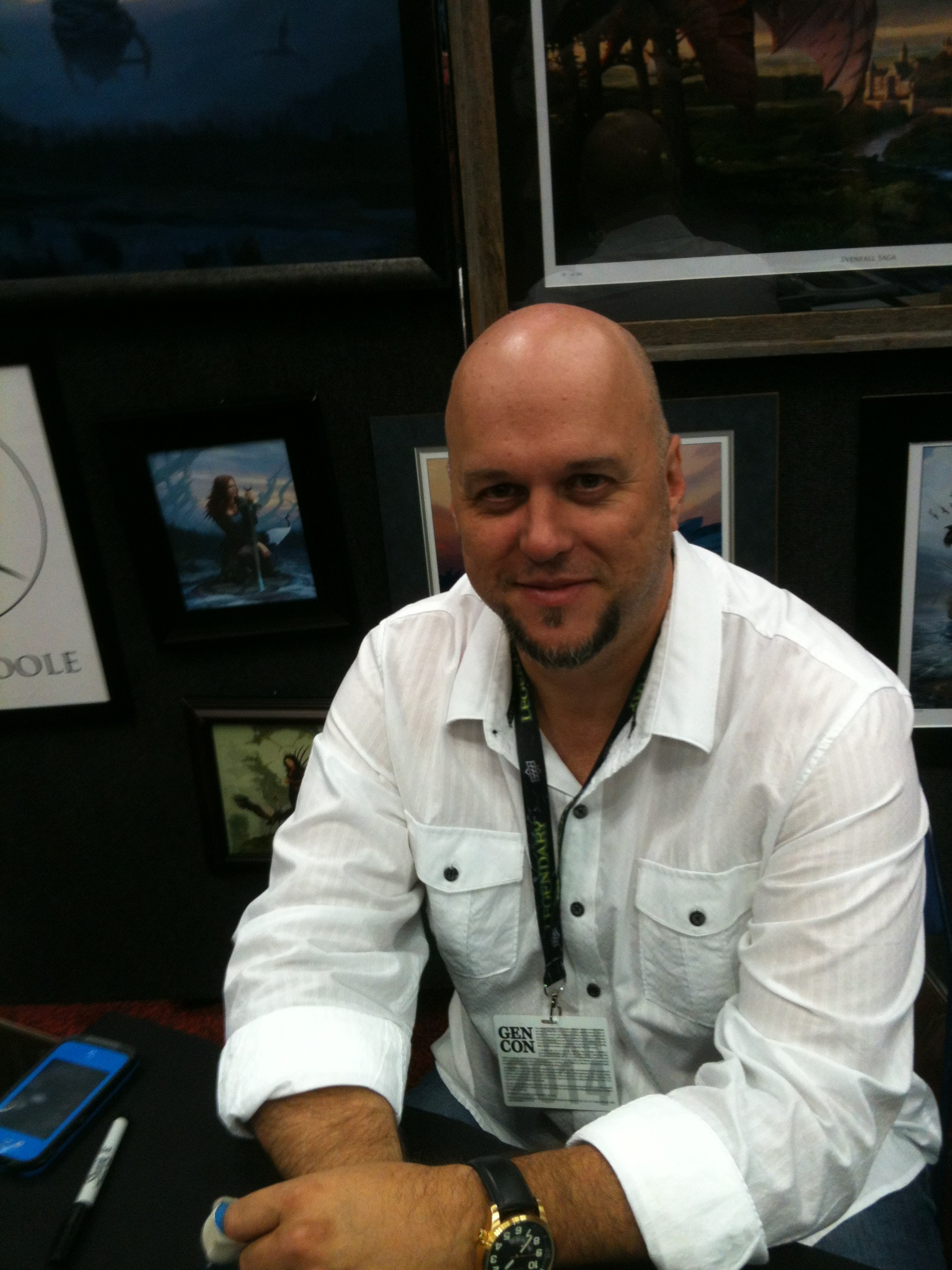
- Mark Poole at Gen Con Indy 2014
- Born: August 31, 1963 (age 61); Goldsboro, North Carolina, US
- Known for: Fantasy art

Mark Poole (born August 31, 1963) is an American fantasy artist, best known for working on the first set of Magic: the Gathering cards.

== Biography ==
Poole was born on August 31, 1963, in Goldsboro, North Carolina. He graduated from University of South Carolina in 1986 with a BFA in fine arts and design. Poole works mostly in acrylic, oil and digital media.

He has also worked for companies such as White Wolf Publishing, Warcraft, Sony Online Entertainment, Upper Deck and Ziggurat Games. His work was featured at FantasyCon in July 2014.

His artwork featured on the Magic: the Gathering basic Island card from the "Summer Magic 1994" set fetches about $600.

== Collectible card game credits ==
- Anachronism
- Battlelords
- BattleTech
- Deadlands: Doomtown
- Dragon Storm (not a CCG, but a collectible common-deck card game)
- Dune
- Fantasy Adventures
- Galactic Empires
- Guardians
- Legend of the Five Rings
- Magic: the Gathering
- Middle-earth
- Mortal Kombat
- Mystical Empire
- Mythos
- Netrunner
- Redemption
- Shadowfist
- Tempest of the Gods
- Vampire: The Eternal Struggle
- Warhammer 40,000
- Warlords
- World of Warcraft

== Role-playing game credits ==
- Cover of Aftermath Technology gamebook (1992)
- Aria: Canticle of the Monomyth gamebook (1994)
- Babylon 5 Project Sourcebook, and Earthforce Sourcebook (1997)
- Dungeons & Dragons Magic Item Compendium Sourcebook, and Magic of Incarnum Sourcebook (2007)
- Fantasy Role Playing Gamer's Bible (1996)
- Promethean: The Created Pandora's book, Pandora's box, Strange Alchemies game supplements (2006)
- Prophecy rulebook (2007)
- Stalking the Steel City gamebook cover (1992)
- Worlds of Darkness: Second Sight character and setting book (2006)

== Other credits ==
- Adventurer's Limited issue #1 (1995)
- Clout Fantasy chip art (2005)
- Cover of Dragon issue #201 (January 1994)
- The Duelist interior artwork; issues #2-3 (1994)
- Legends of Norrath (digital collectible card game)
- Star Wars Galaxies
