= Susan Van Camp =

American fantasy artist

- Born: June 11, 1959 (age 66)
- Known for: Fantasy art

Susan Van Camp is a fantasy artist, best known for her work on various role playing games.

== Biography ==
Van Camp was born on June 11, 1959, and raised in Flint, Michigan. She began her commercial career in gaming by doing work for Steve Jackson's Car Wars series. From there she proceeded to comic books with Arrow Comics' Tales from the Aniverse in 1984, and Varcel’s Vixens from Caliber Comics. Comics led to science fiction conventions and the art shows held at the conventions, where she began painting and putting her paintings up for bidding by the public. In 1994 Van Camp began doing work for Magic: The Gathering.

She began selling her own RPG game in 1996, Dragon Storm.

== Role-playing game credits ==
- Otosan Uchi (Legend of the Five Rings) (2000), Alderac Entertainment Group; interior artist
- Doomtown or Bust! (Deadlands: The Weird West) (1999), Pinnacle Entertainment Group; interior artist
- Blood Enemies: Abominations of Cerilia (Birthright) (1995), TSR, Inc; interior artist
- Faeries (Ars Magica) (1995), Wizards of the Coast; interior artist
- Houses of Hermes (Ars Magica) (1994), Wizards of the Coast; interior artist
- Earthdawn (1993), FASA Corporation; interior artist
- Paranormal Animals of Europe (Shadowrun) (1993), FASA Corporation; interior artist
- Citybook VI - Up Town (Catalyst) (1992), Flying Buffalo; interior artist
- Central Casting: Heroes Now! (1991), Task Force Games; cover artist
- Citybook V - Sideshow (Catalyst) (1991), Flying Buffalo; interior artist

== Other game credits ==
- Clout Fantasy, Base Set (2005), Hidden City Games; chip art
- Tempest of the Gods, core set (1995), Black Dragon Press; card art
- Galactic Empires, Primary Edition (1994), Companion Games; card art
- Legends (Magic: The Gathering) (1994), Wizards of the Coast; card art
- Arabian Nights (Magic: The Gathering) (1993), Wizards of the Coast; card art

== Magazine article credits ==
- "Animal Henchmen" in Dragon #269 (Mar 2000); interior artist
- "The City of Lofty Pillars" in Dragon #201 (Jan 1994); interior artist
- "Dungeon Mastery: Talk of the Town" in Dragon Annual #2 (1997); interior artist
- "Ecology (Love-Life) of the Lamia" in Dragon #192 (Apr 1993); interior artist
- "PC Portraits: Gnomes & Halflings" in Dragon #262 (Aug 1999); interior artist
- "The Wizard's Companion" in Dragon #246 (Apr 1998); interior artist

== Short story credits ==
- "Dedrak's Quest" (Sci-Fi) in Dragon #250; interior artist

== Sources ==
- "Official website". Archived from the original on May 17, 2014.
- "Pen & Paper RPG Database listing for Susan Van Camp". Archived from the original on June 30, 2009.
