= Pantheon: Rise of the Fallen =

Unreleased video game

- Developers: Visionary Realms, Inc.
- Directors: Chris Rowan; Chris Perkins; Sam Scott; Jeanna Ruschell; Mike Butler; Ben Dean
- Producer: Robert Crane
- Designers: Chris Perkins; David Beach; Tyler Stokes; Tim Wathen
- Programmers: Kyle Olsen; Steve Clover; Robert Crane
- Artists: Chris Willis; Jared Pullen; Duarte Ferreira; Brett Nuckles; Tim Schuhler; Esther Shin; Phillip Keidge; Tara Solbrig; Cody McDowell
- Writer: JN Gerhart
- Composer: Chris Perkins
- Engine: Unity
- Platform: Windows
- Genre: Massively Multiplayer Online Role-Playing Game
- Mode: Online multiplayer

Pantheon: Rise of the Fallen is a high fantasy MMORPG currently in development from Visionary Realms, Inc. that incorporates both new and classical game mechanics. Brad McQuaid, the co-creator of EverQuest and founder of Visionary Realms, served as the CCO for Pantheon until his death in November 2019. Pantheon's creative vision is pioneered by Chris Perkins, who has served as the creative director for Pantheon since 2015. As of December 2024, Pantheon is currently in Early Access.

== Setting ==
Pantheon: Rise of the Fallen takes place on the high fantasy world of Terminus, a wildly diverse planet formed from fragments of many different realms that were forced together by massive planar collisions, each bringing their own unique civilizations and deities. Roughly 450 years after these collisions began, the god Ittero corrupted his Ginto race into a "craven, vicious people" known as the Revenant and unleashed them upon the world. Thirty-four years later, as prophecy foretold, six powerful beings called War Wizards arrived on Terminus and pushed back the Revenant armies, until two years later when the War Wizards disappeared without warning. When this happened, the remaining races mysteriously lost contact with their deities. The year is now 987 Ithosbrun Hjilen (IH), as the races strive to establish a foothold on Terminus and regain connection to their deities.

== Gameplay ==
Pantheon: Rise of the Fallen places a heavy emphasis on the social aspects of MMORPGs, such as grouping up with other players to overcome challenging encounters, joining guilds, and earning a reputation in the community. Pantheon primarily has a PvE-centric design, although the developers have committed to having at least one PvP server at launch. When creating a character, players choose from nine races and twelve classes. Most races only have access to certain classes. The twelve classes are divided into four class archetypes: Tank, Damage, Healer, and Support (Crowd Control). Each archetype is designed to excel at a specific role in a group setting. While PvE encounters in the game are designed to provide a challenge for a group of players, there are encounters that can be completed by a solo player. Some of the character classes are better suited for this than others, and some encounters may be more difficult and require more creative tactics when soloing, as opposed to grouping. There are also some raid encounters, each of which is designed for either 12, 24, or 40 players.

The game world in Pantheon is a seamless open world, meaning there are no instances and the only times players may be presented with a loading screen is when teleporting across the world or entering certain dungeons. Pantheon does not have "quest hubs" or a mini-map, and instead aims to reward players for exploring organically. While traveling throughout the world, players may encounter the Perception system, which is designed to teach players more about their surroundings and encourage further exploration. There is also a Climbing system, which allows players to traverse almost any vertical terrain in the world if their Climbing skill level is high enough. Pantheon is designed to make players respect and fear the world, but also be enticed by it. As such, characters are incentivized to avoid death.

Throughout the game world, players may encounter six extreme natural climates: Frigid, Scorching, Toxic, Anaerobic, Pressure, and Wind Shear. Furthermore, each climate has various tiers, which correspond to how punishing it is to those in its area of effect. For example, a player may be able to survive being in a Tier 1 Frigid climate, but would experience some minor detrimental effects, such as a weapon or movement speed penalty. The higher tier a climate is, the more severe the detrimental effects would be. Players can reduce the detrimental effects of climates by collecting and applying glyphs to their character, having innate racial bonuses, equipping gear that increases their acclimation score, or spending time in that climate. Additionally, players may encounter Fractures, which are supernatural obstacles that players will have to contend with to navigate certain areas. Some examples of Fractures include Shifting Walls, Frenetic Floor, Absolute Darkness, and Intangibility. To counter the effects of Fractures, players will need to find and equip special rare items called Artifacts, each of which offers unique utility versus a particular type of Fracture.

Character progression in Pantheon is designed to be gradual enough to make accomplishments feel more meaningful. One important aspect of character development is obtaining spells and abilities. Many of the more powerful and exotic spells and abilities are acquired from hard-to-find NPCs in various parts of the world. Through various means, characters can collect Mastery Points, which can be used to upgrade their abilities via The Living Codex.

Pantheon uses a limited action set system, meaning that at any given time, a player can have no more than 8 abilities that generate aggro on their action bar and 6 abilities that do not generate aggro on their utility bar. Pantheon also uses a dual-targeting system, allowing players to simultaneously have an offensive and defensive target, with abilities automatically being applied to the appropriate target when activated. Furthermore, certain abilities allow players to have multiple offensive targets or multiple defensive targets. In combat, players may encounter NPCs with Dispositions or Traits. Dispositions change the way the NPC behaves, while Traits change the stats and properties of the NPC. Both systems are designed to present players with a unique encounter each time they visit a particular area, and require the players to adapt their strategies accordingly.

There are also forms of horizontal progression in Pantheon, such as Crafting and Gathering. Players can choose from six Crafting professions: blacksmith, outfitter, woodworker, jewelcrafter, provisioner, or alchemist. To collect raw materials for these professions, players can utilize the 5 Gathering skills: mining, woodcutting, harvesting, skinning, and fishing. Each crafting profession and gathering skill can be leveled up to gain access to more materials and recipes, and players can further pursue specializations in each. While optional, Crafting and Gathering are designed to be integral aspects of the game, with crafted items being just as valuable as items looted from NPCs. Other than a few class-specific rewards, such as epic quest items, most items in the game can be crafted. Crafting is designed to have a symbiotic relationship with adventuring - both will need each other at certain times. For example, instead of having to loot a specific item, it might be more beneficial to find another player who is advanced enough in crafting to have access to that recipe. Crafting also goes hand-in-hand with adventuring by allowing crafters to customize looted items to better suit the specific needs of a player.

== Development ==
On January 13, 2014, Pantheon: Rise of the Fallen was announced alongside a Kickstarter campaign. The funding goal was set at $800,000, but the campaign raised only $460,657 from 3,157 backers. Because the funding goal was not reached, Visionary Realms did not receive any of the pledged money. Immediately after the campaign ended, Visionary Realms launched their own website and began crowdfunding independently by selling pledge packages with various perks, such as early character name reservation, in-game cosmetic items, and access to testing phases. Early Access is now available for purchase through the official Pantheon website and Steam. Visionary Realms also began prototyping their gameplay in the Unity engine using purchased Unity store art assets as "this allows the world builders to lay out intricate and challenging dungeons without having to create art assets themselves or wait for a 3D modeler to create them." Throughout the Kickstarter campaign and creation of their own website, the Visionary Realms team had been working "completely pro bono." Two months after their website launched, in April 2014, Brad McQuaid announced that progress on Pantheon had to be put on hold as the team had to leave to find other sources of income. Any donations during this time went "directly to maintaining the website... and not towards development." One month later, Brad McQuaid announced that work on Pantheon would resume with a new volunteer team.

On January 7, 2015, Brad McQuaid announced that Chris Perkins, who had originally joined the team as a composer, was promoted to Creative Director. On September 28, 2015, Visionary Realms announced that they had received seed funding from an angel investor. This allowed the team to expand and begin receiving "very modest pay."

On March 11, 2016, Visionary Realms streamed live gameplay of Pantheon for the first time ever on their Twitch channel. Over 8,000 unique viewers tuned in throughout the 100+ minute broadcast. The developers continue to periodically stream gameplay and development updates on Twitch.

On April 26, 2017, Visionary Realms announced that Series A funding is complete: "Series A funding allows the company to expand the team in almost every department and bring the game into a semi-private pre-alpha state where external testers and focus groups can begin sampling the game." On October 21, 2017, at TwitchCon 2017, Visionary Realms announced that Pre-Alpha testing would begin "in time for the holidays." Pre-Alpha testing began on December 12, 2017, with backers who had pledged at the corresponding tier. At PAX East 2018, Brad McQuaid claimed that Pantheon "should be in alpha by the end of the year." However, in August 2018, Visionary Realms walked back that claim, saying that their plans had changed in order to bring the game "closer to launch-quality in art and polish."

In October 2019, Chris Perkins stated that Visionary Realms' Lead Programmer Daniel Krenn had left the company and was replaced by Kyle Olsen, who had joined the team five months prior. On November 18, 2019, Brad McQuaid died. The cause of death has not been made public. On December 5, 2019, Visionary Realms in conjunction with the McQuaid family announced "The Pantheon Video Game Art & Design Scholarship In Memory of Brad 'Aradune' McQuaid" at Laguna College of Art & Design, along with a statement that they are "even more resolved to complete the vision he set out to create."

In January 2020, Chris Perkins was promoted to Creative & Programming Producer in addition to his existing role as Creative Director. This new position means he is responsible for managing "the overall development effort by identifying priorities, establishing production milestones and directing the daily Programming and Creative tasks to meet those deliveries." On October 14, 2020, Visionary Realms announced that they had spent the previous several months performing a major refactor on the game's codebase "to move from hardcoded, inflexible implementations to more robust and scalable solutions... We took this time to develop the actual foundation and pipelines that we were going to need to ship the game. Systems got torn out and reconstructed into a much more efficient and flexible format. Zones were harvested and replanted in expandable graybox format... This is what was needed to move forward, to get the game built in a way that could be rapidly built upon with little wasted effort from development and to scale to the size of project that Pantheon is meant to be." Later that same month, Project Producer Ben Dean responded to concerns about funding by stating, "We are currently prepared to launch the game with the current velocity of crowdfunding. In that scenario it means a much longer development cycle and launching without all the features, graphic fidelity and content we would like. But it specced out, and planned. In the ideal situation, which is what we aim for, funding increases-- whether by investment, partner deals, or an increase in crowd funding-- and then a bigger, fuller game launches much sooner. The ONLY doomsday scenario is if crowdfunding stops. And we have no reason to believe that will happen as long as we are able to earn it by showing our progress."

On January 19, 2021, Visionary Realms announced that they received a seven-figure investment from a private party. While it is not full funding, it allows them to "begin preparations to support over 8,000 players already signed up for an alpha release of the game." On March 27, 2021, Visionary Realms released a to-do list of items they deem necessary to complete before backers who have pledged at the Alpha tier can be brought in to test the game. It stated, "a more traditional Alpha would serve function over form and some of the unessential bells and whistles would be excluded. But Pantheon Alpha will be different. Thousands of people will experience Pantheon for the first time in Alpha. We are in an era where certain expectations are set when it comes to a first hands-on look at a game. For better or worse, we do need to consider form as well. If resources are going into form and function, then we need to be judicious about which features are included at the start of alpha, which are introduced later in alpha, and which, if any, are left for beta." Starting in August 2021, Visionary Realms began providing monthly updates on the progress for each of those items as part of their Producer's Letters.

On July 21, 2022, Visionary Realms announced that they "have secured another $2.4 million USD from private investments... Added to the funds raised in earlier stages of Series A funding, our total investment capital raised to date, is now $5.34 million. This figure is additional to crowdfunding efforts..." Visionary Realms went on to elaborate that this investment came from a group of like-minded, accredited investors who believe in the vision for Pantheon after having investigated the company's financial and production status behind the scenes. On July 27, 2022, popular Twitch streamer CohhCarnage announced that he was one of the private individuals who contributed toward the US$2.4 million investment.

In December 2024, Pantheon: Rise of the Fallen released to Early Access on Steam and on the game's website. The game is now available for all to play.
