= Tales from the Aniverse =

1985 science fiction comic book

- Cover of the first Arrow Comics issue, illustrated by Randy Zimmerman.

Publication information
- Publisher: Arrow Comics; Wee Bee Comics; Massive Comics
- Schedule: Various
- Format: Ongoing series
- Genre: Science fiction
- Publication date: 1985 – 1991
- No. of issues: 10

Creative team
- Written by: Randy Zimmerman; Susan Van Camp
- Artist(s): Randy Zimmerman; Susan Van Camp
- Penciller(s): Randy Zimmerman; Susan Van Camp
- Inker: Randy Zimmerman
- Editor(s): Ralph Griffith and Stuart Kerr (Arrow); Pete Follo (Wee Bee); Randy Zimmerman (Massive)

Tales from the Aniverse is a science fiction comic book created by Randy Zimmerman and Susan Van Camp, first published in 1985 by Arrow Comics, featuring anthropomorphic animals as the main characters.

== Overview ==
Tales From The Aniverse was a collection of stories featuring a group of characters in a futuristic animal universe and had such characters as J.B. Space (galactic courier), Miss Chevious (bounty hunter), Falterous (space pirate lord) and Drakestar (maniac ruler of the Avian empire), P'Jonn, and others.

Arrow Comics published Tales from the Aniverse for six issues. Zimmerman restarted the series on Wee Bee Comics in 1987, but it was canceled after its second issue. Massive Comics published three new issues under the original name.

In 1996, Arrow Comics was revitalized a third time and one of the Aniverse's characters, Miss Chevious, was given a mini-series written and drawn by Steph Graves. This lasted two issues. Zimmerman later revived the Miss Chevious character in Flint Comix & Entertainment in 2009.
