= BrikWars =

Minifig wargame

- The Dread Pirate Two-By-Two, an icon of BrikWars
- Years active: 1995–present
- Players: 2+
- Setup time: 5–30+ minutes
- Playing time: 1–6+ hours
- Chance: High (dice rolling)
- Skills: Strategic thinking, Improvisation, Miniature building and customization
- Website: brikwars.com

BrikWars is a free miniatures wargaming system by Mike Rayhawk, created for use with plastic building blocks and figurines. It is designed to be simple and flexible, allowing for its players' full range of creativity in creating armies, creatures, vehicles, and worlds out of construction toys.

Although targeted primarily at adults, BrikWars is known for its straight-faced acceptance of the kinds of ridiculous scenarios and multi-genre mashups that arise naturally when children dump out their unsorted toybins on the floor. Much of its humor comes from satirizing "serious" wargames and their players, while flouting or deliberately misinterpreting conventions of the genre.

The purpose of BrikWars is to provide a safe and comfortable setting in which groups of cute and friendly minifigs can mutilate and slaughter one another. The battle can be large or small, balanced or skewed, ordered or chaotic; what’s important is that the level of mindless violence is kept at an entertaining high.

A physical release of the game published by Modiphius Entertainment was announced in 2023.

== Play mechanics ==
BrikWars uses "minifigs" (usually Lego minifigures or equivalent miniature figures from other construction toy brands) as small soldiers, and terrain constructed from construction bricks or random objects found near the playing area. While the game can be played with non-construction-toy-related objects, such as action figures, stuffed animals, or chessmen, the rules lend themselves best to figures and structures which can be easily disassembled and reconstructed. These models might represent real or imaginary forces and situations, but are just as likely to represent exactly what they are - toys engaging in arbitrary battles for toy supremacy.

BrikWars is a turn-based skirmish-level miniatures wargame. Each player in the game controls forces custom-built from construction toys or whatever materials they have at hand. The creations are assigned attributes according to the current size and features of the physical models at any given moment.

Players take turns, with each player moving and attacking with each of their units able to do so, before passing the turn to the next player in sequence. This continues until each player or team has succeeded or failed in their objectives, or until players agree that the battle is over. Normally each unit is able to move once (a number of inches based on its "Move" statistic) and take a single major action (usually to make an attack, or to use one of its special abilities known as a "Specialty") in a given turn, in addition to any number of minor actions. Units have lots of options such as: withholding its action that turn, to be able use that action in response to Enemy action; sprinting; charging; bailing or forming up into a squad.

For determining the success or failure of actions and attacks, each unit is assigned an appropriately sized polyhedral die for its Action attribute, which it must roll against a set number determined by the difficulty of the act. When an attack successfully hits, the attacker rolls their weapon's Damage dice in the hopes of overcoming the target's Armor stat. Most infantry units are killed by having their Armor overcome once, while larger vehicles and structures are more resilient and may take multiple hits (with their abilities correspondingly degraded) before being destroyed.

The rules also encourage players to disobey the rules as often as possible, as seen in the "Law of Fudge", and for special Hero units who can attempt to ignore the rules completely once per turn with a Heroic Feat. The rulebook repeatedly encourages fun over obsessive rules-lawyering, with an emphasis on making the game as enjoyable as possible for all parties involved.

== History ==
Legowars, the predecessor of BrikWars, was invented in March 1991 by Eric O'Dell and R. Todd Ogrin. Legowars featured space-themed combat between Lego minifigures, and was distinguished from other miniature wargames of the time by a strong building-brick construction theme allowing the customization of playing pieces. It was followed in January 1995 by a sequel, Legowars II.

In October 1995, the authors of Legowars received a cease and desist order from the Lego Group for their improper usage of the trademarked word "Lego". As Steve Jackson describes it:

Ever since our web site went up, it's had a link to the Lego Wars home page, maintained by Todd Ogrin. The game, which he created along with E.O'Dell, is a wicked parody of WH40K, using bits of Lego to create the miniatures you play with. But now, if you hit his site, all you'll see is the story of the letter he got from the lawyers at Interlego A.G. Todd's a student . . . he can't afford a legal battle with a giant corporation, regardless of what his rights may be under the "fair use" doctrine.

So Ogrin and O'Dell removed their content, but others archived it (adding legal disclaimers). Meanwhile, Mike Rayhawk started work on what would become BrikWars:

...and so Rayhawk took it upon himself, intending to replace each instance of the offending L-word with the less legally-contentious "Brik." As the project progressed...., additions and modifications turned BrikWars into a separate entity in its own right by the tail end of 1995, now a universal battle engine rather than solely focused on the adventures of the Lego Wars SpaceMan.

The very first edition of what would eventually become BrikWars was written in the waning months of 1995. This text spent a shadowy existence, passing from person to person by photocopies and e-mail for nearly a year, mutating and changing along the way. Eventually the game found its first stable Internet home on the web page of an Oregon State University student by the name of Chad Bagaasoc, requiring the assembly of a 'definitive' text from the many variations in use at the time. This was accomplished in early 1997, and that text remained in authority for over a year and a half.

In February 1997 Rayhawk formally announced BrikWars on rec.toys.lego. BrikWars has been in continual development ever since.

== Reception ==
BrikWars is part of a wider movement of homebrew wargames based on LEGO and other children's building block toys, including Evil Stevie's Pirate Game by Steve Jackson. According to The Escapist, BrikWars is a "standout LEGO tabletop effort" in this scene.

Reviewing it on Boardgamegeek, Luke Mason emphasized the economy of "taking all those hundreds of unused LEGOs sitting around and adding stats and rules to them so you can have a real wargame with them."; as well as its "flexible and affordable (if rough in design)" design. He summarizes his views as:

Overall, it's a lot of fun for anyone willing to deal with its "published for free on the internet" nature. By that, I mean that it's not half as well-rounded as most games designed by publishers, because it's literally just one dude with a website writing every single rule.

== See also ==
- LUGNET
