= Earthforce Sourcebook =

Role-playing game supplement

Earthforce Sourcebook is a supplement published by Chameleon Eclectic Entertainment in 1997 for the science fiction role-playing game The Babylon Project.

Cover art by John Gronquist, 1997

== Contents ==
Earthforce Sourcebook is a 140-page full-colour softcover book designed by Joseph Cochran, Jon Tuffley, Dale MacMurdy, Charles Ryan, and Zeke Sparkes, with illustrations by Theodore Black, Audrey Corman, Darryll Elliot, John Gronquist, Chris Impink, Mark Poole, Douglas Schuler, and Christina Wald. The book provides information about the space navy called Earthforce, as well as expansion rules for space combat.

The book is divided into four chapters:

1. Earthforce history and organization, and rules for Earthforce characters
2. Earthforce equipment
3. Earthforce ships, and rules for space combat
4. Major non-player characters (NPCs), including backgrounds and personalities

The book also includes two cardboard sheets of colour ship counters

== Reception ==
In the May 1998 edition of Dragon (Issue #247), Chris Pramas found the first half of the book "a really dry read" and by the end of Chapter 2, "my interest was about to flatline". However, Pramas thought the second half's space combat rules and NPC profiles saved the book; the space combat rules in particular would "make fighting combats much more challenging and enjoyable." Pramas concluded by giving the book an average rating of 4 out of 6, adding a recommendation: "Don’t let the first half of this book bring you down; the second half delivers. Earthforce Sourcebook is worth the price for the space combat rules alone and it is a must for anyone serious about running a Babylon Project campaign."
