= Deadworld =

American comic book series

- Arrow Comics Deadworld #1

Publication information
- Publisher: Arrow Comics; Caliber Comics; Desperado Publishing (Image Comics/IDW Publishing); Transfuzion Publishing
- Schedule: Ongoing
- Format: Ongoing series
- Genre
- Publication date: 1987 – present

Creative team
- Created by: Stuart Kerr; Ralph Griffith; Vince Locke
- Written by: Stuart Kerr; Vince Locke; Gary Reed
- Artist(s): Vince Locke; Sami Makkonen

Collected editions
- Deadworld Classic: Volume 1: ISBN 1-60010-817-2
- Deadworld Omnibus: Volume 1: ISBN 160010858X

Deadworld is an ongoing American comic book published by Desperado Publishing in association with IDW Publishing.

The series follows survivors in a post-apocalyptic scenario brought on by zombie attacks led by King Zombie, an intelligent, talking zombie.

== Publication history ==
Originally published by Arrow Comics, Deadworld was written and created by Stuart Kerr and Ralph Griffith in 1987, scripted by Kerr for the first seven issues and illustrated by Vince Locke. The comic book quickly became a cult favorite success in the independent publisher industry.

Arrow Comics ceased production of all titles, but sold the rights of the title to Locke who transferred the rights to Gary Reed's Caliber Comics. By the twelfth issue of the title, Reed took over as the primary writer. The first volume of Deadworld ended in 1992 after twenty-six issues. One year later, a second volume began and ended after fifteen issues.

After a lull in its printing, the series returned to print in 2005 through Image Comics, with Gary Reed and Locke working on the series. By issue number #3, Croat comic artist Dalibor Talajić took over illustration duties and completed the story arc of Requiem to the World. Following that, Image released Deadworld: Frozen Over with guest writer Michael Raicht and artist Federico Dallocchio. Deadworld: Bits and Pieces collected the short stories and scenes from various issues and was released through Transfuzion Publishing. Desperado released Deadworld Chronicles which featured all-new short illustrated tales of Deadworld. Deadworld: Slaughterhouse was released in 2010 with artwork from Sami Makkonen. Slaughterhouse was originally intended as a four issue series, but after the first issue was shipped, it was released as a complete story in hardcover. The four issues were later released separately in digital format only. IDW released volumes one and two of Deadworld Classics which collects the long out-of-print first original 16 issues illustrated by Vince Locke. Gary Reed joined up with Gary Francis for the original graphic novel, Deadworld: The Last Siesta, illustrated by Mark Bloodworth and released through IDW (ISBN 1613770448).

In 2012, Gary Reed teamed up again with Sami Makkonen to bring Deadworld into full color for the first time. The five-issue series, "War of the Dead" was released by IDW as a weekly comic series during the month of August and then collected in October (ISBN 978-1613775080). It received a number of award nominations including the Shel Dorf for Best Mini-Series and Comic Monsters.com for Best Mini-Series and won the Ghastly Award for honoring excellence in horror comics as Best Mini-Series.

In October 2012, Reed released a special graphic novel-sized book called "Voices from the Deadworld". This was a series of single-page tales from those who lived and died in Deadworld with each text page accompanied by an original illustration from over 40 various artists.

Also that year, Reed licensed Deadworld to PopFunk for T-shirts and to Breygent Marketing for a collector card series. IDW also released the "Deadworld Omnibus" which collected the Image series' "Requiem for the World" and "Frozen Over" plus the "Slaughterhouse" saga from Desperado. (ISBN 978-1600108587).

The most recent series was Deadworld: Restoration, the full-color follow-up mini-series to War of the Dead, also from IDW which debuted in December 2013 with the final issue shipping in April 2014.

In 2015, Reed launched Deadworld Zombie Soda, in 12 themed flavors: Orange Roamer (Orange); Goon Bitters (Cherry Cola); Royal Rotter (Black Cherry); Brain Sap (Cream Soda); Zeek Cocktail (Cotton Candy); Geek Juice (Vanilla Cream); Grisly Swill (Grape); Slow Decay (Vanilla Root Beer); Rot Berry (Strawberry); Twilight Shuffler (Root Beer); Morbid Mix (Green Apple); and Graveyard Delight (Ginger Ale). Each soda contains one of 48 label images drawn by various comic book artists. A collectible soda trading card set featuring the label images was also released. Additionally, Deadworld Premium Chips were released in 2 flavors: original and BBQ.

== Issues ==
=== Ongoing series ===
The ongoing series are:

Deadworld vol. 1

- #1-9 (Arrow)
- #10-26 (Caliber)

Deadworld vol. 2

- #1-15 (Caliber)

=== Limited series ===
Caliber:

- King Zombie #1-2
- To Kill a King #1-3
- Realm of the Dead #1-3
- Tattoo #1-4
- Deadworld Archives #1-3 (reprints the first three Arrow issues)

Image:

- Deadworld vol. 3 #1-6 (2005)
- Deadworld Frozen Over

Desperado:

- Deadworld Slaughterhouse OGN

IDW:

- War of the Dead #1-5
- Restoration #1-5

=== One-shots ===
One-shots include:

- Deadworld: Daemonstorm
- Dead Tales
- Dead Killer
- Deadworld: Necropolis
- Deadworld: Plague
- Roadkill: A Chronicle of the Deadworld
- Dire Wolves: A Chronicle of the Deadworld
- Deadworld: Bits & Pieces
- Deadworld Chronicles
- Deadworld: Voices from the Deadworld

== Contributors ==
=== Vol. 1 ===
- Mark Bloodworth
- Paul Daly
- Dan Day
- Jack Herman
- Phil Hester
- Stuart Kerr
- Vince Locke
- Ron McCain
- James O'Barr
- Scott Parish
- Gary Reed
- Mark Winfrey

=== Vol. 2 ===
- Chris Morea
- Troy Nixey
- Gary Reed
- Galen Showman
- Chris Torres

=== 2005 to present ===
- Mark Bloodworth
- Federico Dallocchio
- Vince Locke
- Sami Makkonen
- Mike Raicht
- Gary Reed
- Dalibor Talajić

== Collected editions ==
The series has been collected into a number of trade paperbacks:

- Deadworld Book One (WeeBee did the first print, Caliber did the 2nd and 3rd printings)
- Deadworld Book Two (Caliber)
- The Killer & The King (Caliber), reprinted as The Dead Killer (Image)
- Realm Of The Dead (Caliber)
- Deadworld: Requiem for the World (Image) ISBN 1582407177
- Bits and Pieces: trade collection of shorts and scenes (Transfuzion)
- Deadworld Chronicle: All New Stories (Desperado)
- Deadworld Classic:
  - Volume 1 (collects Deadworld #1-8, 288 pages, IDW, August 2010, ISBN 1-60010-817-2)
  - Volume 2 (collects Deadworld #9-18, 272 pages, IDW, July 2011, ISBN 1-60010-925-X)
- Deadworld Omnibus: Volume 1 (reprints Frozen Over, Slaughterhouse and Deadworld vol. 3, 352 pages, January 2011, IDW, ISBN 1-60010-858-X)
- Deadworld: War of the Dead ISBN 978-1613775080
- Deadworld: Restoration (June 2014, ISBN 978-1613779743)
- Deadworld Archives (Caliber)
  - Book 1 (2016) ISBN 978-1942351245 (collects v1 #1–4)
  - Book 2 (2016) ISBN 978-1942351252 (collects v1 #5–8, and "Doom Patrol")
  - Book 3 (2016) ISBN 978-1942351269 (collects v1 #9–14)
  - Book 4 (2016) ISBN 978-1635298772 (collects v1 #15–18, "Deadtales: Amy", and "Deadtales: When a Body Meets a Body")
  - Book 5 (2016) ISBN 978-1635298741 (collects v1 #19–23, and "Guns for Sale")
  - Book 6 (2016) ISBN 978-1942351290 (collects v1 #24–26, "Dead-Killer", and "A Deadworld Christmas in Louisiana")
  - Book 7 (2016) ISBN 978-1942351306 (collects v2 #1–4, "Body of Art", and "City")
  - Book 8 (2016) ISBN 978-1942351313 (collects v2 #5–10)
  - Book 9 (2016) ISBN 978-1942351320 (collects v2 #11–15)

== Deadworld CD-ROM collection library ==
Eagle One Media collected and released the first 46 issues of the original Deadworld comic book series along with two mini-series onto CD-ROM. Each page from the issues is scanned and viewable on one's PC in protected (non-extractable) PDF format.

== Adaptations ==
=== Film ===
By June 2009, Deadworld was revealed to be turned into a film. Jeffrey D. Erb and Framelight Productions, along with Dark Hero Studios partners David Hayter and Benedict Carver, had teamed up with Bill Mechanic to turn the comic book into a zombie feature franchise. In 2013, Gary Reed said that the option had expired and he did not renew it. The film has been put back onto the schedule and is now in pre-production for an as yet unknown release.

=== Audio ===
A series of dramatised audiobooks adapting Reed's reboot of the comic series was released by American audiobook company GraphicAudio.
