= Bob: Lord of Evil =

Bob: Lord of Evil is a 1998 role-playing game supplement published by Peregrine Press for Murphy's World.

== Contents ==
Bob: Lord of Evil is a supplement in which a techno‑fantasy‑horror setting allows characters from any game to be incorporated into the fictional realm ruled by Bob. It is designed for short-form adventures.

== Reviews ==
- Rue Morgue #25
- Backstab #11
- Casus Belli #116
