= Arrow Comics =

Independent comic book publisher

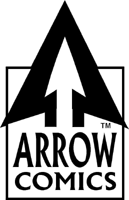
- Founded: 1985
- Founders: Ralph Griffith; Stuart Kerr; Randy Zimmerman
- Country of origin: United States
- Headquarters location: Ypsilanti, Michigan; Burton, Michigan
- Key people: Randy Zimmerman (Editor-in-chief); Scott R. Moore (Publisher); Luke Stone (Editor)
- Publication types: Comic books
- Imprints: Arrow 3G
- Official website: www.arrowcomics.store

Arrow Comics was one of the original independent publishers of black-and-white comics in the mid-1980s, the first truly creator-owned comic companies, started in Ypsilanti, Michigan, by founders Ralph Griffith (24 April 1960–11 December 2020) and Stuart Kerr.

== History ==
=== Origins ===
Griffith and Kerr were just getting ready to publish a local comic fanzine called Fantastic Fanzine (a name which they later discovered had already been used in the seventies by Fantagraphics founder Gary Groth), when the first issue of Teenage Mutant Ninja Turtles came out. Spurred on by the success of this fairly low production level book, Griffith and Kerr set about to gather their own 'bullpen' of local comic creators and start a comic company, using Fantastic Fanzine as a springboard. With their motto "Our Target is Entertainment; Our Aim is Quality", they intended to bring to the black-and-white comic book market their idea of quality work, in comparison to what they thought was sub-par work intended only as a source of revenue for the larger publishers. Fantastic Fanzine ran thirteen issues in its first volume, during which time Griffith and Kerr discovered local Michigan artists Randy Zimmerman, Guy Davis, Vincent Locke, Susan Van Camp, Mark Bloodworth, and Tim Dzon.

In December 1985, Tales From The Aniverse by Zimmerman and Van Camp was published, followed shortly thereafter by The Realm, Deadworld, and Nightstreets. Other titles included Legend Lore: Tales from the Realm and System 7, but it was not long before Arrow found itself caught up in the infamous "black and white bust", and the revenues from their highest-selling titles were held up in the bankruptcy hearings of several major comic book distributors of the day. In 1989, in order to salvage their legacy, Griffith and Kerr agreed to the move of their most popular titles, The Realm and Deadworld, to Caliber Comics.

=== 1993 revival ===
After publishing three issue of Fantastic Fanzine volume two throughout 1992, Griffith and Kerr announced the return of Arrow Comics in a single issue of Fantastic Fanzine volume four in December 1992, this time explicitly under the Arrow Comics banner. In January 1993 they released the first issue of The Dead, a horror title written by Griffith and Kerr themselves and penciled by Jason Moore (later of Evil Ernie inking fame), that pushed the envelope on gore even farther than their earlier Deadworld. Despite the first issue being labelled "For Mature Audiences Only", the violence and nudity made retailers reluctant to carry it, and only one additional issue was published (featuring the banner "Banned in Canada and the U.K.!!!") before Griffiths and Kerr moved to Caliber Comics to write Oz (1994–1997).

=== 1998 revival ===
After the release of Shock and Spank: The Monkeyboys by Creative Force Designs in 1996, a far more significant revival began with the first of four issues of Arrow Anthology by Arrow Comics Group in 1997, followed in 1998 by a variety of titles continuing the Oz series from Caliber Comics: Dark Oz, Land of Oz, Wogglebug, Wonderland, and Bill Bryan's Oz Collection. Also beginning in 1998 were a second volume of The Dead, The War of the Worlds: The Memphis Front, Arrow Spotlight, August, and Korvus v2 (continued from Human Monster Press). A sub-imprint named "Arrow Manga" began in 1999 and included Descendants of Toshin, Miss Chevious: The Armageddon Project, Semantic Lace, and Butterly Gunn (originally solicited as Happy the Clown Manga Special). In 2002, "Arrow Books" released the trade paperbacks The War of the Worlds: Haven and the Hellweed, which collected the 1996 Caliber Comics The War of the Worlds series written by Zimmerman, and then Zimm's Heroic Tales, a superhero anthology.

=== 2008 revival ===
With strong support from Internet readers, the most recent incarnation of Arrow Comics has been spearheaded by Randy Zimmerman and Scott R. Moore, publishing the webcomics Spank the Monkey and Rebel Nun (both by Zimmerman).

=== 2021 Revival ===
Randy Zimmerman has once again restarted Arrow Comics, due to a retail deal that never existed) and, along with a number of other Indie creators, returned to publishing comics for the direct and crowdfunding market. Initially began as Arrow Comics 4.0 the number designation was dropped in January 2023 and the brand continues on as Arrow Comics. A new "sub-brand was begun in February 2023 entitled "Arrow Comics 3-G" to designate their adult content titles from their more family friendly works. AR-13L is the first title to carry the "3-G" designation. Since then, Arrow Comics has grown its catalog to include a variety of properties from creators. Zimmerman began Arrow's rebirth with his Hero Bot Zero, Calico of Shard, and Paragon titles. He then recruited creator Luke Stone and added the Hybrids:The Sons of Gods series to the roster. From there, additional creators and their properties joined the team. Craig white joined with his space war adventure, SOLTAC. Justin K. Sweet brought his bionic werewolf, Chrome-Dog. Stone partnered with Piper Steed to produce the all ages sci-fi adventure, Rift Riders

Shortly after the revival of Arrow Comics, both Zimmerman and Stone fell ill with the Delta variant of the COVID-19 virus. Both spent several months in the hospital and had similar experiences with life threatening complications to the virus. Fortunately, after 5 months of hospitalization and rehab, both returned to work.

With renewed creative energy, the company got a shot of adrenal and properties such as Zimmerman's The Fool and Allison Chains were added in 2023 and 2024 respectfully.

=== Current ===
Arrow comics continues to recruit new creators and properties from talented content producers in the independent comic book industry. They are currently distributing to the direct market and fans. They host an online where their properties are available in physical and digital formats.

== Titles ==
- AR-13L : The Little MERCmaid (2023), #1
- Arrow Anthology (1997–1998), #1–4
- Arrow Spotlight: The Adventures of Simone & Ajax (1998), #1
- August (1998), #1–3
- Bill Bryan's Oz Collection (1998), #1
- Butterfly Gunn (2000), #1 (originally solicited as Happy the Clown Manga Special #1)
- Calico Of Shard (2022), #1
- Camelot's Last Knight (2001), #1
- Chrome Dog (2023), #1
- Dark Oz (1998), #1–5
- The Dead
  - v1 (1992), #1–2
  - v2 (1998), #1–3
- Deadworld v1 (1986–1990), #1–15 (continued at Caliber Comics)
- Descendants of Toshin (1999), #1
- Dr. Goyle (1999), #1 (continued at Hound Comics)
- Fantastic Fanzine
  - v1 (1984–1986), # 1–12, 14 (no #13 published)
  - v2 (1986), #1
  - v3 (1992), #1–3
  - v4 (1992), #1
  - v5 (2005), #1–3
  - Christmas Special (2005), #1
- The Fool #1 (2023)
- Hero Bot Zero (20210–2023), #1–3
- Hybrids #1–9 (2021–2022)
- Hybrids: Volume 1: Trash Day (2022), TPB
- Hybrids: Volume 2: The Killing Field (2023), TPB
- Korvus v2 (1998), #1 (from Human Monster Press)
- Land of Oz (1998–2000), #1–9
- Legend Lore: Tales from the Realm (1988), #1–2 (continued at Caliber Comics)
- Miss Chevious: The Armageddon Project (1999), #1–2
- Nightstreets (1986–1987), #1–5
- Only Death Can Save Us (2021), #1
- Owosso Taco House Funnies, #1 (2008)
- Paragon (2022), #1
- The Realm v1 (1986–1987), #1–12 (see WeeBee comics for #13, continued at Caliber Comics)
- Rift Riders (2023), #1
- Revolt #1–2 (2021–2022)
- Semantic Lace (1999), #1–2
- SinKiller (2022–2023), #1–2
- Soltac (2023), #1-3
- Spank The Monkey (1999), #1–4
- Spank the Monkey on the Comics Market (2000), #1–3
- System 7 (1987), #1–3
- Tales from the Aniverse (1984–1986), #1–6 (continued at WeeBee Comics Aniverse #1-2, then published by Massive Comics #1-3)
- The War of the Worlds: Haven and the Hellweed (2002), TPB (collects the 1996 Caliber Comics series, The War of the Worlds)
- The War of the Worlds: The Memphis Front (1998), #1–2
- Wild Planet (2008), #1–2
- Wogglebug (1998), #1 (a Dark Oz special)
- Wonderland (1998), #1–3
- Zimm's Heroic Tales (2002), TPB
- Allison Chains (2024), #1
