= Dragon Storm (game) =

Tabletop role-playing game

Dragon Storm is a role-playing game which is also a collectible common-deck card game, published by Susan Van Camp and Mark Harmon through Black Dragon Press. Van Camp had acquired the company in late 1996 after it had problems publishing Tempest of the Gods. Under her leadership, development of Tempest of the Gods was terminated to focus on Dragon Storm.

All required statistics and rules are printed on the cards. There are two types of cards: Gamemaster cards for adventure generation and Player cards for character generation. An expansion set, titled Kanchaka Valley, is available in booster form, and additional deluxe cards were created and sold on an individual basis. This is collectively known as Classic Dragon Storm.

Over past several years, Dragon Storm 2.0 (DS 2.0) has been created and developed. DS 2.0 is an updated version of the game that takes into account the first 15 years of play and corrects some errors that crept into the game over time. It also utilizes a new modular character creation system, which allows players to fully customize their characters. The Classic system, while totally viable, is more restrictive. There is also a dwindling supply of Classic product available. DS 2.0 is currently under the purview and production of The Guild for Dragon Storm.

== Setting ==
Dragon Storm is a role-playing game about shapeshifters: human werewolves, dwarven gargoyles, human dragons and elven unicorns.

These characters live in an area known as the Stormlands. They use supernatural powers to battle powerful enemies, and to save the world from Dragon Storms. Most Stormlanders live like peasants of the European Middle Ages. They are ruled by nobles, who spend their time fighting for control of Stormland city-states. These struggles mean little to most people, who live in isolated villages scattered throughout the land. Magic is more important to Stormlanders. They respect Od, the force of pure magic, used by wizards, witches and shamans to heal and protect. They fear Warp, corrupt magic used by necromancers to debase and destroy. Warp can blight a land, poisoning water and tainting the soil. It twists living things into Warpspawn and plague beasts, insane monsters who kill for pleasure.

Stormlanders are superstitious, tough and resigned to their fate. They take consolation in the worship of Elethay, goddess of the earth.

Few peasants dare hope for better times ahead. Only the elders talk about Valarian Champions, legendary heroes who will save the people from the storms. The Stormlands got its name from dragon storms, tempests of wild magic that ruin crops, level homes, and cause the tox, a horrible disease that twists body and soul. It is little wonder that Stormlanders who suffer misfortune are called storm-struck. When caught in the open by a dragon storm, young adults sometimes transform into shapeshifters. Elves become unicorns, dwarves become gargoyles and a human might turn into a werewolf or a dragon. After the storm passes, these shape shifters return to their mortal form, and are able to control their ability to change shape. No one understands why some people change, but it is a fearful thing. Shapeshifters are magical beings with strange and disturbing powers: Gargoyles can reach through solid stone, unicorns can heal with a touch of their horns, werewolves fight with terrifying fury and dragons can breathe fire. These abilities unsettle most Stormlanders, but they are even more frightened of necromancers, evil wizards who hunt shape shifters. Necromancers can drain shape shifters of their natural magics, using the power to fuel toxic spells. Feared by their families and hunted by necromancers, these young shape shifters usually flee their homes before anyone discovers what they have become.

In Dragon Storm, players role-play a shapeshifter or an orc. Their opponents are necromancers, Warpspawn and adventurers; their allies are Elethay worshippers and Prismatic Wizards, who oppose necromancers and all their works. Long-lasting characters may acquire a mentor. These veteran spell casters and warriors are dedicated to the destruction of necromancers and Warp.

Characters befriended by mentors can become Valarian's Champions, and join the fight against the evil poisoning the world.

== Reception ==
Andy Butcher reviewed Dragon Storm for Arcane magazine, rating it a 6 out of 10 overall. Butcher comments that "As an introduction to roleplaying, Dragon Storm has a great deal of potential for both players and referees, especially those with prior experience of one or more CCGs. It's a quick and easy system which requires a minimum of set-up time, and could prove to be a lot of fun."
