= Instance dungeon =

Type of area in online games

In massively multiplayer online games, an instance is a special area, typically a dungeon, that generates a new copy of the location for each group, or for a certain number of players, that enters the area. Instancing, the general term for the use of this technique, addresses several problems encountered by players in the shared spaces of virtual worlds. It is not widely known when instances were first used in this genre. However, The Realm Online (1996) is sometimes credited as introducing the concept.

== Design considerations ==
Single-player games are great, and I love them. They have a great feature. Your life is very special. You are the hero and you get to save the whole world. You live a truly charmed existence, and around every corner you are finding new things. You're blissfully unaware of your neighbor who is also playing the game. (...) [Tabula Rasa] is like Disney World, which has a hub. You can go to shops and get food, but when you get on the boat for the pirate ride, you're in your own version of reality. Once the ride starts, you are blissfully unaware of the boats in front of you and behind you. Then when you finish, you are in the hub, and you can navigate over to the next place.

— Richard Garriott, in Dungeons and Dreamers: The Rise of Computer Game Culture from Geek to Chic (2003)

The problem can be stated as follows: every player wants to be "The Hero", slay "The Monster", rescue "The Princess", and obtain "The Magic Sword". When there are thousands of players all playing the same game, clearly not everyone can be the hero. The problem of everyone wanting to kill the same monster and gain the best treasure became obvious in the game EverQuest, where several groups of players would compete and sometimes harass each other in the same dungeon, in order to get to the monsters dropping valuable items. The creation of instances largely solves this set of problems, leaving only travelling to and from the dungeon as a potential risk in player versus player environments.

Stated another way, instances can be used to reduce the competition over resources within the game. Excessive competition in these spaces leads to several undesirable behaviors such as kill stealing, spawn camping, and ninja looting as players do whatever they can to acquire the limited rewards. Instancing preserves the gaming experience, since some gaming scenarios do not work if the player is continually surrounded by other players, as in a multiplayer setting. Instance dungeons may contain stronger than usual mobs and rare, sought-after equipment. They also may include level restrictions and/or restrict the number of players allowed in each instance to balance gameplay. Several games use instancing to scale the mobs to the players' levels, and/or the number of players present.

Despite its advantages, instancing in MMOGs has been criticized. Brad McQuaid, lead designer of EverQuest and Vanguard: Saga of Heroes (both of which did not feature instancing at launch), wrote an essay in 2005 arguing that instances can negatively affect the game's community, virtual economy, churn rate, and other factors. In response to this article, Raph Koster added that instancing should be limited to situations in which the creation of a "pocket zone" makes sense within the context of the fictional universe – such as the holodeck in the Star Trek franchise. One reviewer described the extensive use of instancing in Age of Conan as "[destroying] the sense of expansiveness an MMORPG should have".

== Technical considerations ==
Having players participate in instances tends to spread out populations of players, instead of concentrating them, which may reduce or level the workload for both the server and client by limiting the number of potential interactions between players and objects. Because the player characters in the instance do not need to be updated on all the information going on outside the instance, and vice versa for the characters outside the instance, there is an overall decrease in demands on the network, with the net result being less lag for the players. This also reduces the demands on each player's computer, as the number of objects to be processed can be more easily limited by the game's developer. The developer can better reason about the worst-case performance requirements in an instance because they do not have to consider scenarios such as hundreds of players descending on any location at any time.

== Usage ==
Perhaps the first virtual world to use instances was the MMORPG The Realm Online, launched in 1996. Combat in this game was extensively instanced, with every battle taking place in a special room outside of the open world.

In Guild Wars, Town/Outpost areas are created on demand, with a new "district" of that town being created for every 100 players in it; players can move between these at will. When entering an Explorable Area or Cooperative Mission, a separate instance will be created for each group (ranging in size from 2 to 12) of players. Players can play with players across the globe, as in EVE Online, along with the advantages in load scaling and resources of a traditional multiple server model for ArenaNet, the developers.

In RuneScape, instances are used mostly in quests, so that other players cannot interfere with the player who is doing the quest, such as battling boss NPCs or having to accomplish a special task. They are also used in certain 'minigames'. However, most monsters not related to quests are not instanced, so players often have to compete with each other to get the reward from killing them. They are also used extensively in the new skill Dungeoneering. The player-owned-houses (commonly abbreviated as P.O.H.), houses that can be owned and built by players, are instanced, with each house having its own instance.

Wizard101 has a unique system for its instances. As soon as a player steps on the entry area, ten seconds are given for up to three other players to enter. Once inside, the instance usually triggers a new line of quests, which must be completed to gain access to other parts of the instance. If a player logs out or leaves through the "front door", progress will be reset (a warning message will appear). If a player dies, flees, or teleports, data will then be reset in 30 minutes. If a monster is defeated in an instance, it stays defeated. Players can repeat instances as many times as they want.

== See also ==
- Game server (or "shard")
- Persistent world
