= Tracks to Telluride =

- Board after a game
- Players: 2–6
- Setup time: 5 minutes
- Playing time: 2 hours
- Chance: Medium
- Age range: 13–adult
- Skills: Resource Allocation

Tracks to Telluride is a railroad board game centered on the construction of railroad track, and servicing mines along those railroad tracks. The setting of the game is in southwestern Colorado during the mining boom of 1873 through 1888. The game was developed by John Bohrer with playtesting by the Edgewood Gaming Group and the Pittsburgh Smoking Engineers.

The first release was called Colorado Rails.

== History ==
In the early 1980s, John Bohrer played a lot of war games. "One guy brought by a game he had gotten as a gift from his girlfriend called Rails through the Rockies." They played the game and found some shortcomings. Bohrer researched railbuilding in that region and era. He significantly revised the rules, used the Rails through the Rockies map and called the new game Rocky Mountain Rails.

After further research I developed my own map; it eliminated eastern Colorado so that I could concentrate on western Colorado's mines and geography. I combined this map with probabilistic pass completion system [sic] and further research on the mines to arrive at Tracks to Telluride.

The historical event deck contains actual events, and I used this as a vehicle to illustrate the trials and tribulations these CEO's had in building the railroads, and to help the struggling railroads (1/3 of the deck) and to offer character building experiences (1/3 of the deck) to the powerful railroads. Some gamers call this the "hysterical event deck". I have kept it out of Advanced Tracks to Telluride at the request of the tournament players. AT2T will give them other acts of God to contend with, not the least being the weather.

The game board is copyrighted 1992.Tracks to Telluride is copyrighted 1994. Advanced Tracks to Telluride is copyrighted 1995.

Tracks to Titicaca is the second game in the Tracks series. It is set in the Andes between the years 1870 and 1930.

== Gameplay ==
=== Setup ===
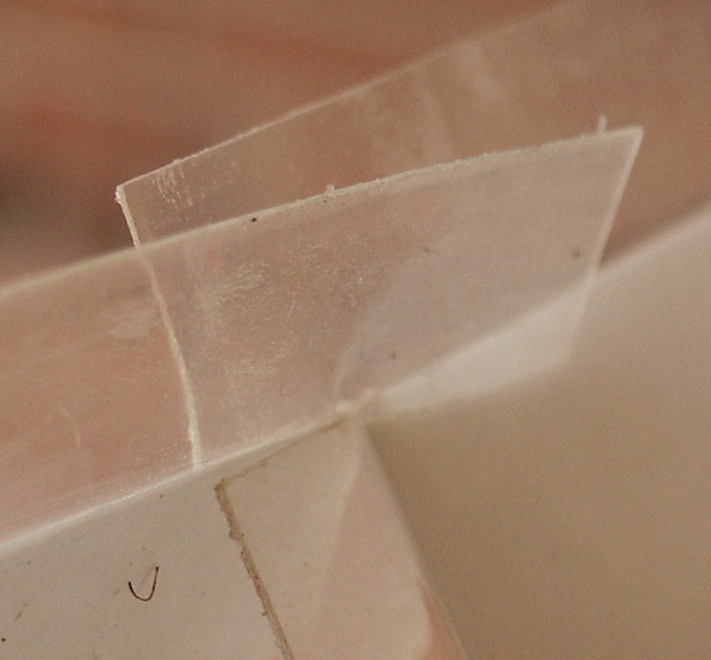
Detail of interlocking tabs

The game is played on a map of southwestern Colorado between the cities of Denver, Grand Junction, Dolores and Trinidad. The map is four sections of laminated paper riveted together in the center. The map is assembled by interlocking the tabs at the edge of the map.

All of the mine cards are then shuffled together. The top seventeen are dealt out as the initial set of open mines. The remaining mine cards are separated out into four stacks by type: gold, silver, coal and varied (miscellaneous).

The season indicator card is set to summer. Play order is determined randomly using the turn-order cards. In turn order, each player decides on his starting city: Denver, Colorado Springs, Pueblo or Trinidad. In reverse turn-order, each player then decides on narrow or standard gauge track. Each player starts with $20. Play proceeds at the Determine Railroad Order stage.

=== Play ===
Each season of play proceeds in the following order:

1. Change Season: The season card is flipped from summer to winter or vice versa.
2. Draw Mine Event Card: Top mine event card is drawn and for each mine listed, open mines close or closed mines open.
3. Draw Historical Event Card: Top historical event card is drawn and effect(s) take place.
4. Determine Railroad Order: Least cash is first; ties go to narrow-gauge railroad; other ties resolved randomly.
5. Declare Mountain Pass Attempts: During summer only, each player, in turn order, may declare up to two mountain passes to attempt to build through.
6. Attempt Court Ordered Injunction: Each player, in turn order, may attempt a court injunction forbidding work on a pass.
7. Attempt Mountain Pass Completion: Each player, in turn order, may attempt to build through a declared pass not blocked by a court injunction.
8. Build Track and Tunnels: Each player, in turn order, builds tracks and tunnels at rates determined by the terrain. Standard-gauge railroads pay twice the narrow-gauge rate for building track. Bonuses are collected for the first railroad to build to each unconnected town.
9. Acquire Mine Contracts: Any previously-uncontracted or newly-opened mine will make an exclusive contract with any railroads built to it. If there is more than one railroad available, then the highest bidder gets the exclusive contract to service that mine.
10. Announce Rate Wars: Each player whose railroad is connected at two or more cities with another railroad may declare a rate war with that other railroad, possibly decreasing both of their incomes.
11. Receive Mine Income: Each player receives money from the open mines contracted to their railroad. Standard gauge receive twice the amount that the narrow-gauge railroad will receive.
12. Investors: Each turn, each players receives $5 from new investors.

=== Winning ===
The game ends either when one railroad is connected to both Denver and Grand Junction, or all of the historical event cards have been played. At the end of that season, draw one more mine event card and close all mines listed on it.

The winner is the player whose railroad receives the most mine income at the end of the game. Remember, standard-gauge railroads receive twice the income from each mine that a narrow-gauge receives.

== Advanced Tracks to Telluride ==
Advanced Tracks to Telluride
- Tracks to Telluride board is used
- Players: 2–6
- Setup time: 5 minutes
- Playing time: 4–6 hours
- Chance: Medium
- Age range: 13–adult
- Skills: Resource Allocation

Advanced Tracks to Telluride is an expansion for the Tracks to Telluride game that uses the same map and rules with some rule additions. The game was developed by John Bohrer with playtesting by the Edgewood Gaming Group, the Trout to Telluride Club and the Pittsburgh Smoking Engineers.

There are now four seasons, and the spring and fall may be mild or harsh (snowy). The game starts in a mild spring. During winter and harsh seasons, track needs to be plowed to be passable. During winter, snowplows may become stuck in passes, unable to plow any further the entire season. During winter, there is no building of new track, and an additional cost to build new track during harsh seasons. Each of the three types of snowplow can plow a different amount of track, but only the lowest technology (blade) is available at the beginning of the game. Each of the three types of snowplow will plow a different amount of track, but a given snowplow will plow the same amount of track regardless of the gauge.

A railroad may build dual-gauge (both narrow-gauge and standard-gauge) track for a one-time surcharge of $25. Each section of track converted to dual-gauge costs the same as narrow-gauge track. Existing, plowed track may be converted to dual-gauge even during harsh and winter seasons, but at an additional cost.

A railroad will receive a "regional bonus" if it is the only railroad to have plowed track during a season in certain cities. Instead of a railroad getting an exclusive contract for a mine and receiving that mine's income, any railroad that has plowed track during a season to a mine will receive a share of the income. Standard gauge railroads received two shares to the narrow-gauge railroads' one.

Track maintenance costs must be paid for at a cost of one dollar for every:

- Six hexes of narrow-gauge
- Four hexes of standard-gauge
- Three hexes of dual-gauge

Any player may choose to end the game once one of the ten game-ending-conditions has been met. The game winning conditions is the same as for the Tracks to Telluride for the first nine conditions. However, if the someone ends the game because of the tenth condition, a railroad has saved at least $300, then the railroad with the most money wins.
