= Murphy's World =

- Murphy's World Cover
- Designers: Kevin Davies and David Brown
- Publishers: Peregrine Creative Services
- Publication: January 1995
- Genres: Humor
- Systems: Weapons & Wonder
- Copyright by Kevin Davies with David Brown 1988-1995

Murphy's World is a humorous techno-fantasy role-playing game set in a world where 'Murphy's Law's rule: if something can go wrong, it will.

== Setting ==
Murphy's World is actually the Realm of Faerie, the Land of Myths and Legends, the place of popular folklore and dreams (with a dash of pop culture) — comically twisted, yet maintaining an internal sense of 'logic'. It operates according to Murphy's Laws, which means that belief creates reality, and as a result reality is utterly fragmented. The real culprit is the planet's sun, Ludo. The strange distorting energies with which this amber orb assaults the little planet effectively toss any sense of predictability of natural laws or supernatural forces right out the metaphysical window. Murphy's World also happens to be in possession of an extensive but rather faulty network of interdimensional teleportation gates (through which many of the inhabitants have unwillingly arrived), connecting Murphy's World to just about everywhere. Thus, many residents of the planet are like Murphy — reluctant alien immigrants. New arrivals can pop up (in, down, or sideways) anywhere; confused, embarrassed, and wondering how to get home. Unfortunately, spaceships usually crash upon entering the atmosphere, and return gateways are often invisible, faulty, or out of order.

== System ==
The game includes its own custom system, although it can also function as a setting which can be incorporated into any other game.

== Reviews ==
- Pyramid #16 (Nov./Dec., 1995)
- Backstab (Issue 1 - Jan/Feb 1997)
- Dragão Brasil #33

== See also ==
- Bob: Lord of Evil
