= Rules lawyer =

Person who uses rules for their own benefit

A rules lawyer is a term used to describe a participant in a rules-based environment who attempts to use the letter of the law without reference to the spirit, usually in order to gain an advantage within that environment. The term is commonly used in wargaming and tabletop role-playing game communities, often pejoratively, as the "rules lawyer" is seen as an impediment to moving the game forward. The habit of players to argue in a legal fashion over rule implementation was noted early on in the history of Dungeons & Dragons. Rules lawyers are one of the "player styles" covered in Dungeon Master for Dummies. The rules of the game Munchkin include various parodies of rules lawyer behavior.

== Related terms ==
- In the US military, "sea lawyer" is used in the navy, and "barracks lawyer" in the army.
- The term "language lawyer" is used to describe those who are excessively familiar with the details of programming language syntax and semantics.
- On English Wikipedia, a "wikilawyer" is a contributor who attempts to use the wording of policies to win disputes rather than reaching the goal of the policy.

== See also ==
- Gaming the system
- Letter and spirit of the law
- Malicious compliance
- Nomic
- Work-to-rule
