= Guardians (card game) =

Collectible card game

- The card back to Guardians CCG
- Designers: Keith Parkinson and Luke Peterschmidt
- Publishers: Friedlander Publishing Group
- Players: 2-4
- Playing time: Approx 45 min
- Chance: Some
- Skills: Card playing

Guardians is a fantasy-themed collectible card game (CCG) published by Friedlander Publishing Group (FPG) in 1995. The initial set was sold in 60-card starter decks and 14-card booster packs.

== Gameplay ==
Each player assembles a 55-card deck from the starter deck and booster packs; it must include at least one Guardian and three Strongholds. Other types of cards needed include Terrains, Shields, Magic Items, Bribes (Beer and Babe cards), and Creatures. Unlike other CCGs, Guardian also features a rectangular battlefield with a 4 x 3 grid placed between the players. Each player places their three Stronghold cards in the row closest to them. The two rows that lie in between are a no man's land called the "disputed territories".

A game represents two armies contesting a battle, each protected by a Guardian.

== Victory conditions ==
A player wins by fulfilling any one of three victory conditions:

1. The player defeats the enemy Guardian.
2. The player conquers all 6 squares of "disputed territories".
3. The player destroys five enemy Shields.

== Publication history ==
Guardians was designed by Keith Parkinson and Luke Peterschmidt, with initial artwork by Parkinson, Brom, Don Maitz, Mike Ploog, and James Warhola. It was published by Friedlander Publishing Group (FPG) in 1995.

=== Artwork ===
As new booster packs were released, the list of contributing artists grew to include:

- Chris Achilleos
- Denis Beauvais
- Timothy Bradstreet
- Larry Elmore
- Wilson Keith Elmore
- Richard Hescox
- Ken Kelly
- Rowena Morrill
- Mark Poole
- Shaw
- Darrell K. Sweet

=== Marketing ===
Artwork and marketing sometimes featured scantily clad women and used suggestive sexual themes, especially the class of cards called "Babes." In an article/advertisement by designer Luke Peterschmidt in Inquest, an illustration of three buxom women has the caption "Six of the... uh, three of the best things about Guardians."

== Expansion set list ==
- Guardians Revised Edition
- Dagger Isle (120 cards)
- Drifter's Nexus (120 cards)
- Necropolis Park

The Dagger Isle expansion set, consisting of 120 cards, was released in mid-1996 and sold in 14-card booster packs. The 120-card expansion set Drifter's Nexus was released in April 1996 and sold in 8-card booster packs.

== Reception ==
In the April 1996 edition of Dragon (Issue 228), Rick Swan called Guardians "an impressive little weirdo," but warned that the "Babe" cards were "the most blatant display of sexism the industry's seen." He called the combat system "the game's best feature," and complimented its "several ingenious twists." Swan concluded by giving the game an average rating of 4 out of 6, saying, "Guardians is not without its problems. For a premise this goofy [...] it's way too complicated [...] Still, the plusses outweigh the minuses, making it a must for collectible card freaks with an eye for good art."

In the September 1996 issue of The Duelist (Issue 12), Allen Varney reported that the game had a strong following in Philadelphia, Ohio, England and France.

In a review in the September 1996 issue of InQuest, Jason Schneiderman stated that the expansion set Drifter's Nexus is "an all-out comedy".
