= WildStorms: The Expandable Super-Hero Card Game =

Collectible card game

- Card back to the Wildstorms CCG
- Designers: Matt Forbeck and Drew Bittner
- Publishers: Wildstorm Productions
- Players: 2-3
- Playing time: Approx 1 hour
- Chance: Some
- Skills: Card playing Arithmetic; Basic Reading Ability

Wildstorms is an out-of-print collectible card game (CCG) published in October 1995. It was developed under the Image Comics Brand and published through Wildstorm under the helm of Jim Lee. It featured all of the Wildstorm characters.

The 315-card set was sold in 60-card starter decks consisting of 45 commons and 15 other cards (uncommon, rare, or super-rare).

== Card types ==
=== Character cards ===
Each character featured at least three basic stats: C (for close combat), R (for ranged combat), and D (for defense). Close combat ratings are an indicator of how well a character would fare in combat using their fists or weapons. Any character could use their Close Combat attack without any requirements. Ranged combat ratings are an indicator of the character's proficiency in using guns or similar ranged weapons. In order to use an R attack, the character must be equipped with a ranged weapon. The defense rating of a character is compared against the strength of the C or R attack to determine if the attack was successful. Many characters featured additional skills which provided special attacks or allowed the characters to perform special abilities. These included long ranged attacks (such as Heat or Thrown Objects) which were an indicator of the character's ability to perform unique attacks. Other abilities included Flight, Teamwork, and Leadership, each of which affected gameplay and combat.

=== Other card types ===
Aside from the character cards described above, the game also included Combat cards, Plot Twist cards, and Equipment cards. Combat cards were used during combat to increase an attacker's combat strength, lower an opponent's defense, or add a special ability. (For example, a combat card may provide +1 to a C attack, and cause the opponent to lose their next turn if the attack was successful.) Plot Twist cards could affect gameplay in a variety of ways; some were advantageous for the card's owner, some were designed to hinder an opponent, while other affected every player and character simultaneously. (For example, a Plot Twist card might be played on a character to give that character the Flight ability, while another Plot Twist card may cause all flying characters in play to lose their Flight ability.) Finally, Equipment cards represented guns, swords, personal body armor and many other items which granted strength or special abilities. Aside from the above card types, the game also included Battle Sites and Prizes. Battle Sites had various point values that were achieved by defeating opponent's characters to "control" the battle site, and win the battle. Prize cards were used for the Campaign version of the game, and granted special abilities to their owner.

== Game play ==
Gameplay was balanced through a variety of recognizable CCG avenues. A small number of the most powerful cards were limited to one per deck, which prohibited one player from using multiple copies of one very powerful card. Many of the most powerful characters and equipment had an equally high Point Cost, which made them difficult to bring into play based on the game's mechanics (which limited the number of "Points" a player could bring into play each turn.) In many card games, a novice player would have difficulty defeating a player with the best cards (often most rare and expensive cards). Wildstorms balanced this by allowing the most common cards to take advantage of skills and abilities that increased their power, such as Teamwork and Leadership. These types of abilities could allow a small group of relatively weak characters to have a fighting chance against a very strong opponent.

Where it lacked rule ingenuity, cards were really well developed. Although not really referencing to their respective comic powers. Characters were very well balanced. Far better variety than MTG (Magic: The Gathering). Some of the strongest characters could not use certain cards or abilities due to special requirements. Weaker characters could apply almost all types of cards to benefit their "handicap". Characters were plentiful and very different from each other. One unique aspect to the game was that it held a close resemblance to the comics. No two alike character cards could be played regardless of who owned it. Special Plot Twist cards could allow multiple copies of the same unique character to be in play simultaneously.

With so many varied outcomes to the game but with depriving rules, many fans found themselves making their own rules to accommodate the comics. Players would follow the "No Point" system, which meant that characters came into play with a 10-point cost maximum. There was no point to be gained other than "Killing" other characters, no prizes to take as your own. It was a basic game but so addictive to the fans. Battles would last hours, sometimes even days. Since the lack of deck size with "Fan Rules".

== Card art ==
Wildstorms has been praised for its aesthetics as well as its core game play. The card designs were unique among CCGs at the time, and featured artwork taken directly from the Image comic books. The core combat and gameplay was simple and decreased the initial learning curve.

== Reception ==
Andy Butcher reviewed WildStorms for Arcane magazine, rating it a 6 out of 10 overall. Butcher comments that "This feels like a game that was rushed out without enough playtesting. There's the potential for a very good game here. Perhaps the revision preceding the Unlimited release early next year will fix things. Until then, it's best suited to collectors (for the art), or serious gamers who don't mind putting in the time to make it work."
