= Vanguard: Saga of Heroes =

2007 video game

- Developers: Sigil Games Online; Sony Online Entertainment
- Publisher: Sony Online Entertainment
- Producers: David Gilbertson; Brad McQuaid
- Designers: Salim Grant; Darrin McPherson; Bill W. Fisher
- Programmer: Amanda Tarr
- Artists: Keith Parkinson; Lee Harker; Ben Thompson
- Composer: Todd Masten
- Engine: Unreal Engine 2
- Platform: Microsoft Windows
- Release: January 30, 2007; Early access: January 26, 2007
- Genre: MMORPG
- Mode: Multiplayer

Vanguard: Saga of Heroes was a high fantasy-themed massively multiplayer online role-playing game (MMORPG) developed by Sigil Games Online and published by Sony Online Entertainment (SOE). The game was released on January 30, 2007, and initially sold around 242,000 copies. While the number of active subscriptions (those who play longer than the free month included when buying the game) was estimated to be roughly 130,000, this number fell the next month to about 40,000. In May 2007, Sony Online Entertainment acquired key assets from Sigil Games Online, including all rights to Vanguard.

Following the acquisition by SOE, the focus shifted to bug fixes and gameplay improvements, allowing the game to reach a more presentable state by July 2008. Game Update 6, released two months later in September, introduced the trial island, the Isle of Dawn, which also became the standard starting area for new regular characters. The trial version was subsequently released on October 8. Vanguard transitioned to a free to play model by August 2012. The game was officially shut down on July 31, 2014.

== Gameplay ==
As typical of MMORPGs, characters in Vanguard: Saga of Heroes were created by the player. The name, gender, race, and adventuring class of the player character were chosen and could not be changed later. Twelve characters could be created on one account and the character's appearance could be modified by the player at any time after character creation. The player could begin the game in either the starting area of their chosen race or in the trial zone called the Isle of Dawn. The player also had the option of picking a crafter class and two harvester skills.

Solo play was possible, but, as in many MMORPGs, the classes differed in their solo performance because of the unequal distribution of crucial abilities. Typical soloing strategies, such as self-healing, kiting and fear kiting, were only available to some classes. Controlling fights with crowd control, avoiding fights with stealth or invisibility, and terminating lost fights with fake death or emergency evacuation teleports was not possible for all classes. Some classes, such as the Necromancer, had more soloing options, while others, like the Warrior, were more narrowly focused. Player vs player (PvP) was available on the Sartok FFA PvP server, in the PvP arenas, or on PvE servers using the /duel command. This aspect of gameplay had never been a priority for the developers. Vanguard classes were therefore not balanced with PvP in mind, and some classes were much more capable in this regard than others. For example, the maximum damage of a single attack was restricted to 20% of a target's maximum hitpoints, but certain classes could combine multiple instant attacks, resulting in "one-shotting", or immediately killing other players with no chance for the victim to fight back.

The second sphere of Vanguard was Crafting, and involved creating in-game items using 'recipes' and raw materials. Crafting recipes were a set of actions that had to be performed in a particular order to produce a final result. Each of these actions used 'action points', taken from an action pool. The maximum number of action points available varied with each recipe. During the crafting process, 'complications' could arise which affected the crafting process, usually, but not always negatively. The crafter could attempt to correct complications or resume crafting and deal with the consequences or benefits of ignoring them. 'Diplomacy' is a concept unique to, or at least first introduced by, Vanguard. It was basically a card game inspired in style and rules by collectible card games. Diplomats could enable certain citywide 'civic' buffs and gain special items needed for end-game content such as Guild Houses, the Griffon Mount, and other important quests. Harvesting formed a fourth, simple sphere. Characters had a general harvest skill, which controlled how well one could help others with their harvest, and could choose two out of five harvest types they wanted to specialize in, out of the pool of Mining Metal Ore, Quarrying Stone Slabs and Gemstone Samples, Lumberjacking Wood Timbers, Skinning Leather Hides, and Reaping Cloth Bales. Rechoosing these skills was possible, but all prior progress was lost.

Vanguard was set in a high fantasy world called "Telon", unusual among MMO worlds in that it was almost entirely persistent, with no instancing or load screens. Telon did not have "zones" in the manner of most fantasy MMOs, but there were discrete areas, sometimes called "chunks", which delineated content to some extent and served to provide general geographical reference points. The world contained 19 playable races, many of which were drawn from or inspired by traditional high fantasy sources such as the work of J. R. R. Tolkien and the tabletop fantasy role-playing game Dungeons & Dragons. There were three "continents" in the world of Telon. Each were reachable by direct, contiguous travel from the other continents, via air or sea, or by NPC boat from the major ports of call. There were various ways to travel through Telon, besides walking on land: by mount (horse), by player-crafted ships, by a riftway, and by flying mounts. Vanguard players could build two houses per server per account. Telon contained a large number of dungeons with a broad range of size and theme, found in many types of locations. Some were large, and many were above-ground structures or even outdoor adventure areas rather than traditional catacombs. Although most of the dungeon content were aimed at the 'full-group' encounter (six players), there were numerous areas, particularly at the lower levels, designed for solo play and small groups (2-3 players). All dungeons besides one were open "public" dungeons. There was no instancing anywhere in Telon with the exception of the Ancient Port Warehouse (APW), added to Vanguard by SOE in late 2007. There were a total of six copies of APW, called "shards", and any new raid force had to choose which of the six copies to enter. Vanguard also featured several overland raid encounters.

== Development history ==
Sigil's original Vanguard team was composed of many EverQuest developers, including designer Brad McQuaid. Development began in early 2002 and a publishing deal with Microsoft was made that April. The title was revealed in March 2004, five years after EverQuest was released. Sigil displayed the first screenshots in April, revealing that Vanguard would use Unreal Engine 2.0. In May 2006, Sigil reacquired the marketing rights to Vanguard: Saga of Heroes from Microsoft and Sony Online Entertainment (SOE) became the co-publishing partner. Sigil maintained full control of development, funding, intellectual property rights, and in-game customer service (in the form of the Game Master and Guide programs). Although SOE was mainly responsible for marketing, publication, distribution, subscription services and maintenance of game servers, some of SOE's game designers and artists participated directly in Vanguard's development. During an interview in early January 2014, Brad McQuaid revealed that Vanguard had a development budget of $30,000,000.00. He said that compared to World of Warcraft, Star Wars: The Old Republic or The Elder Scrolls Online, Vanguard's budget was 'fractional' for such an ambitious game, which put a lot of stress on the development team.

Beta testing for the game began in-house in August 2005 and continued until January 2007. Pre-orders were opened on January 26, and the game officially launched worldwide on January 30 to mediocre reviews and widespread criticism.

This partnership represented a homecoming of sorts for Sigil CEO Brad McQuaid who was, along with Sony Online Entertainment CEO John Smedley, Bill Trost and Steve Clover, one of the four original developers of EverQuest for SISA (Sony Interactive Studios America renamed Verant Interactive in 1999).

By May 2007, Sony Online Entertainment acquired all assets of Sigil and retained over half the developers of Vanguard to work for Sony and to continue developing Vanguard. By December 2009, the team outlined the road map for the game in the year ahead. Due to limited resources and a new focus on bug elimination over ambitious content releases, some of the anticipated updates were shelved indefinitely.

SOE revealed in May 2007 their intention to begin merging servers, which was completed in August. All player-owned housing was reset at this time, causing some controversy among the community. The mergers left Vanguard without a dedicated role-playing server and without a team-based player-versus-player server. These servers were merged into two servers in July 2010.

Following the acquisition by SOE, the developers mainly focused on bug fixes and gameplay improvements for awhile. The developers mentioned at the time that they wanted to attract old and new players as the game had reached a much more presentable state in July 2008. Two months later, on September 10, Game Update 6 introduced the trial island, the Isle of Dawn, which also quickly became the standard starting area for new regular characters. The trial version was released a month later on October 8.

In 2009, SOE added its LiveGamer Exchange RMT (real money trading) service to Vanguard, which allowed trading game money, items, and whole characters between players, for real currency. The three remaining US game servers were merged into one in July 2010, bringing the total number of Vanguard servers down to two. After a long hiatus, new game content was released in 2011, with a game update released on August 10, and another on August 24. By summer 2012, Vanguard transitioned to free-to-play model, starting in August. Sony Online Entertainment shut down the game on July 31, 2014. The game website now redirects to Daybreak Game Company.

== Reception ==
GameSpy awarded Vanguard the "Biggest Disappointment" award for 2007. Vanguard also won the awards in the categories for "Least Fun", "Most Desolate" and "Lamest Launch" in the MMORPG.com MMOWTF Awards for the worst games of 2007.

In both May and August 2008, MMORPG.com revisited Vanguard and gave the updated version a favorable response.

The game initially sold around 242,000 copies. While the number of active subscriptions (those who play longer than the free month included when buying the game) was estimated to be roughly 130,000, this number fell the next month to about 40,000.

In a review of Vanguard in Black Gate, Scott Taylor was positive toward its graphics and commented that the game stood the test of time against many of its contemporaries in visual context, but said its graphics could not save the game from other technical issues.

Rating	Details/Link
D-	Vanguard: Saga of Heroes Review on 1up
C+	Vanguard: Saga of Heroes Review on Game-Revolution
7.5/10	Vanguard: Saga of Heroes Review on GameSpot
3/5	Vanguard: Saga of Heroes Review on GameSpy
