= Redemption (card game) =

Collectible card game based on the Bible

Redemption CCG
- Card back of Redemption
- Designers: Rob Anderson
- Publishers: Cactus Game Design
- Players: 2-5
- Setup time: < 2 minutes
- Playing time: < 45 minutes
- Chance: Some
- Skills: Reading; Card playing Adding & Subtracting
- ^{1} Some rules allow more players.

Redemption is a collectible card game based on the Bible. It involves Biblical characters, places, objects, and ideas. The object of the game is for players to use their Heroes (good characters) to rescue Lost Souls by defeating their opponent's Evil Characters, with the first player to rescue five Lost Souls winning the game. Redemption was first published in July 1995 by Cactus Game Design and its creator, Rob Anderson, continues to develop and produce the game and is the final authority on rulings.

== Game play ==
The object of the game is to rescue the required number of Lost Souls (usually five) before the opponent does. To rescue a Lost Soul, a player must initiate a rescue attempt by playing a Hero. The opponent then plays an Evil Character to block the rescue attempt and start a battle. In a battle, players take turns playing Enhancement cards to make their characters stronger. When both players have finished playing Enhancements, the player whose character's Strength is equal to or higher than their opponent's Toughness wins the battle; if the Hero defeats the Evil Character (either by having higher Strength or by removing the Evil Character from the battle via a special ability), the Hero rescues the Lost Soul. After the battle, the winning character remains in play and can be used again on the next turn, and the losing character as well as all Enhancements played during the battle are discarded.

Unlike popular trading card games like Pokémon and Magic: The Gathering, Redemption has no built-in resource system; that is, players are not required to meet any requirements or pay any costs in order to put cards into play. Restrictions or penalties are instead placed on the special abilities of the cards themselves in order to balance game play.

One unique aspect that sets Redemption apart from other CCGs is that while every deck contains both good and evil characters, the game is only won by using good characters. Evil characters can prevent the opponent from winning, but they themselves do not have a chance to win the game.

== Card Types ==
Most types of cards are indicated by an icon in a box in the card's upper-left corner. Certain cards have more than one icon.

- Lost Soul: These represent people who have fallen from the path of goodness and need to be saved. When a player draws one from their deck, they immediately put it into play in a region called the "Land of Bondage" and draw another card from their deck to replace it in their hand. When a Hero rescues a Lost Soul, the player takes the card and puts it in their "Land of Redemption" to keep score. Lost Souls are all named "Lost Soul" and can be identified by the lack of an icon box.
- Character: These represent Biblical figures who are either on the side of good and trying to save lost souls (Hero) or those trying to thwart the Heroes and prevent lost souls from being saved (Evil Character). They have numerical strength and toughness values in their icon box and may also have special abilities that take effect when they are brought into battle. Heroes have a cross icon and Evil Characters have a dragon icon.
- Enhancement: These may be used on characters to boost their battle abilities. They come in two types, good and evil, and may only be used by corresponding Characters. Good Enhancements have an open Bible icon and evil Enhancements have a skull icon.
- Dominant: These cards can be played at any time, regardless of whose turn it is, and take effect instantly. These are the "power cards" of the game, and can often turn the tide of a battle, but the number of these cards in a deck is restricted. Good Dominants have a lamb icon and evil Dominants have a grim reaper icon.
- Site: These cards can hold one Lost Soul each. While a Lost Soul is in a site, only Heroes of the same brigade as the Site may "access" the site and rescue the Lost Soul, unless the Hero also uses one of their own Sites of the same brigade that does not have a Lost Soul in it. Sites have a pyramids icon.
- Fortress: These cards can store other cards within them or provide some form of protective effect on the player. Fortresses have a castle icon.
- Artifact: These provide a supplemental effect on a player's cards or on a battle. Once in play, a player's Artifacts are placed in a face down pile; a player may activate a maximum of one Artifact at a time, on their turn, by putting it on top of their Artifact pile face up (and may deactivate it on their turn by turning it face down). Artifacts have a Holy Grail icon.
- Covenant: These are a combination of an Artifact and a good Enhancement and may be used as either (but not both at once). Older Covenants have two icons within their icon box, an open Bible icon on the left and a Holy Gail icon on the right, and newer Covenants have two icon boxes, one for the Enhancement and one for the Artifact.
- Curse: These are similar to Covenant cards, but instead are a combination of an Artifact and an evil Enhancement. Curses have the same icon boxes as Covenants but with a snake icon instead of a Holy Grail icon.
- City: These cards can be played as either a Site or a Fortress, and have both icons within their icon boxes.

=== Brigades ===
Each Character, Enhancement, Site, Covenant and Curse card belongs to one or more brigades, indicated by the color of their icon box. An Enhancement of a given brigade may only be used by a Character of the same brigade. The colors of the good brigades are Blue, Clay, Gold, Green, Purple, Teal, Red, Silver and White, and the colors of the evil brigades are Black, Brown, Crimson, Gray, Orange, Pale Green and Yellow. A card with a rainbow icon box belongs to all brigades of the corresponding good or evil alignment.

== Distribution ==
The first release of Redemption was in 1995 as a set of 2 starter decks (50-card decks A and B, now out of print) and a set of Limited Edition cards, followed by an Unlimited Edition reprinting.

The game was developed by releasing expansion sets and other starter decks, including, in order of release:

Set Name	Release date
Originals (Limited and Unlimited Printings)	1995
1st Edition Starter Decks (A&B) *	1995
The Prophets (Expansion) *	1996
The Women (Expansion) *	1997
The Warriors (Expansion) *	1999
2nd Edition Starter Decks *	2000
The Apostles (Expansion) *	2001
The Patriarchs (Expansion) *	2002
The Kings (Expansion) *	2003
3rd Edition Starter Decks *	2004
Angel Wars (Expansion) *	2004
10th Anniversary Starter Decks *	2005
The Priests (Expansion) *	2006
Faith of Our Fathers (Expansion) *	2007
Rock of Ages (Expansion) *	2008
Thesaurus Ex Preteritus (Expansion) *	2009
The Disciples (Expansion) *	2010
Faith of Our Fathers (Extended Expansion) *	2011
Rock of Ages (Extended Expansion) *	2011
4th Edition Starter Decks *	2013
Rock of Ages (Collectors Tin #26) *	2013
The Early Church (Expansion) *	2014
The Persecuted Church (Expansion) *	2015
Cloud of Witnesses (Expansion) *	2016
Revelation of John (Expansion) *	2017
The Fall of Man (Expansion)	2018
Prophecies of Christ (Expansion)	2018
Prophecies of Christ 2 (Expansion)	2019
The Lineage of Christ (Expansion)	2020
Gospel of Christ (Expansion)	2022
Israel's Deliverance (Starter Decks)	2023
Israel’s Rebellion (Expansion)	2023
Roots (Expansion)	2024
Israel's Inheritance (Expansion)	2024
Times to Come (Expansion)	2025
End of Times (Expansion)	TBD

* - Out of print

In August 1996, Cactus offered 750 complete sets of all published Redemption cards at about $150 a piece.

== Artwork ==
Several artists have contributed, including Mike Bennett, Jeff Haynie, Michael Carroll and Mark Poole. Some artwork has been taken from other Christian products and from classical artwork. Several recent illustrations have been made using AI. Former art director Doug Gray also made many of the images for the cards himself.

== History and Popularity ==
Soon after Magic: The Gathering introduced the idea of a collectible card game (CCG), Rob Anderson realized that the Bible would be a "wonderful source for this type of game". Redemption was soon designed and has since grown to be the top selling Christian CCG. Additionally, recent (as of this writing) final releases of several long-running trading card games, including Lord of the Rings and Star Trek, make Redemption the second-oldest trading card game in consistent production, only behind Magic: The Gathering.

Contributing to the continued popularity of the game is the ability - especially earlier on - to easily collect the cards due to the more common distribution, smaller set size (as of 2006, there were only about 1,800 unique cards), lack of super-rare chase cards and a slow release of sets (one set is released only every 1–2 years).

A rulebook has been developed and gives a reference for understanding the interactions between the card types and the cards. The most up-to-date rulebook is the 10th anniversary rulebook. An "exegetical" guide is also available for more seasoned players, containing detailed descriptions of every game term.

== Competition ==
Tournaments
The nature of the game allows for and has resulted in a National Tournament structure (within the U.S.). Tournament levels range from Local to District to State to Regional to the National tournament. The National tournament is held once a year and is held in a different location each year. For official tournaments, prizes are provided by Cactus Game Design and they generally include Redemption booster packs and Tournament Promotional Cards. Redemption Nationals is open to all players; there are no prerequisites for entrance.

Online Tournaments
Redemption tournaments are also held online through Lackey CCG, Zoom, and once through the official Redemption Table Simulator (RTS). Online tournaments can be found through the Cactus website or the Redemption discord and function in the same way as face to face tournaments sans the time limit being longer.

Categories of Play
At each tournament, one might play Closed Deck, Booster Draft, Type 1, or Type 2. These categories have different deck building rules.

Ranking System
Redemption has also implemented a Redemption National Ranking System (RNRS) allowing players who cannot make it to the National Tournament to be recognized. Points are awarded for placing in each level of tournament.

National Champions
	2-player Sealed Deck		Multi-player Sealed Deck/Booster Draft		2-player Type 1		Multi-player Type 1		2-player Type 2		Multi-player Type 2		TEAMS	
	Nationals	RNRS	Nationals	RNRS	Nationals	RNRS	Nationals	RNRS	Nationals	RNRS	Nationals	RNRS	Nationals	RNRS
2025	Brian Jones	Brian Jones	Jonathan Gomez	Brian Jones	Tyler Stevens	Brian Jones & Chad Frantz (Tie)	-	-	Brian Jones	Brian Jones	-	-	Jayden Alstad & Tim Estes	Jayden Alstad
2024	Jayden Alstad	Brian Jones	Brian Jones & Jacob Arrowood (Tie)	Brian Jones	Tim Estes	Brian Jones	-	-	Jayden Alstad	Jayden Alstad	-	-	Shon Seivers & Brandon Wade (Tie)	Shon Seivers & Brandon Wade (Tie)
2023	Brian Jones	Brian Jones	Brian Jones	Brian Jones	Nic Marshall	Brian Jones	-	-	Jeremy Chambers	Jeremy Chambers	-	-	Marc Vellake & Jilissa Vellake	Jeremy Chambers & John Hendrix (Tie)
2022	Josh Knitt	Reyzen Cruise	Joshua Potratz	Gracen Cox	Jayden Alstad	Luke Marshall	-	-	Jeremy Chambers	Jeremy Chambers	-	-	Jeremy Chambers & John Hendrix	Jeremy Chambers & John Hendrix (Tie)
2021	Dario Villanova	Chris Fachman	Derek Tirado	Charles Loria	Joshua Potratz	Joshua Potratz	Jeremy Chambers	Jeremy Chambers	Jayden Alstad	Emmanuel Echavarria	Jayden Alstad	John Michaliszyn	Jayden Alstad & John Earley	Shon Seivers
2020	Robin Dermo	Chris Fachman	Charles Loria	Charles Loria	Nic Marshall	Charles Loria	Brandon Frank	Brandon Frank	Tyler Stevens	Joe Schaefer & John Michaliszyn (Tie)	Jayden Alstad	John Michaliszyn	Josiah Beers & John Earley	Emmanuel Echavarria
2019	JD Cunningham	Chris Fachman	Brian Jones	Brian Jones	John Earley	Brandon Frank	Steve Kamke	Patrick Chaverri	Josiah Beers	Jayden Alstad	Jayden Alstad	Jayden Alstad	Jayden Alstad & Justin Alstad	Justin Alstad
2018	Joshua Potratz	Chris Fachman	Jonathan Wagenknecht	Brian Jones	John Earley	John Earley	Noah Wagenknecht	Noah Wagenknecht	Tyler Stevens	Tyler Stevens	Justin Alstad	Justin Alstad	Gabe Isbell & John Earley	Brian Jones
2017	Daniel Huisinga	Chris Fachman	Isaac Miller	Jonathan Wagenknecht	JD Cunningham	JD Cunningham	Jeremy Chambers	Brian Jones	Josiah Beers	JD Cunningham	Justin Alstad	Justin Alstad	Josiah Beers & Brian Jones	Brian Jones
2016	Nathan Levorson	Chris Fachman	Josh Knitt	Jordan Alstad	Gabe Isbell	Gabe Isbell	Jonathan Greeson	Brian Jones	Justin Alstad	Justin Alstad	Tyler Stevens	Gabe Isbell	Gabe Isbell & John Earley	Jayden Alstad & Justin Alstad (Tie)
2015	Dayne Maust	Chris Fachman	Daniel Huisinga	Josiah Beers	John Earley	John Earley	Charles Johnson	Brian Jones	Justin Alstad	Justin Alstad	Justin Alstad	Justin Alstad	Jordan Alstad & Martin Miller	Gabe Isbell
2014	Joseph Zimmerman	Justin Alstad	Joshua Knitt	Jordan Alstad	Zac Cornell	Jordan Alstad	Ray Imgrund	Tim Maly	Jordan Alstad	Jordan Alstad	Dayne Maust	Dayne Maust	Josiah Beers & Jerome Beers	John Michaliszyn & Justin Alstad (Tie)
2013	Justin Alstad	Bill Voigt	Matt Townsend	Bill Voigt	Josiah Beers	Josiah Beers	Tim Maly	Tim Maly	Justin Alstad	Gabe Isbell	Tyler Stevens	Jayden Alstad	Martin Miller & Chris Ericson	Martin Miller
2012	Ian Kratzer	Noel Mendoza	Alex Olijar	Jordan Alstad	Martin Miller	Martin Miller	Chris Ericson	Chris Ericson	Josiah Beers	Kurt Hake and Jordan Alstad	Jonathan Greeson	Jonathan Greeson	John Earley & James Roepke	John Earley
2011	Rebeccah Collins	Noel Mendoza	Eric Wolfe	Scott Kramer	Matt Townsend	Gabe Isbell	Tim Maly	Kurt Hake & Randall Koutnik (Tie)	Nathan Voigt	Nathan Voigt	Jordan Alstad	Jordan Alstad	Gabe Isbell & Kevin Shride	Nathan Voigt
2010	Brandon Abbott	Mike Mendicino	Tyler Stevens	Shawn Capron	Jonathan Greeson	Jonathan Greeson	Nathan Voigt	Nathan Voigt & Matthew Archibald (Tie)	Gabe Isbell	Gabe Isbell	John Earley	John Earley	Gabe Isbell & Kevin Shride	Ben Michaliszyn
2009	Sam Nurge	Josh Randolph	Sam Nurge	Josh Randolph	Gabe Isbell	Gabe Isbell	Brandon West	T.J. Stamp	Gabe Isbell	Gabe Isbell	Ron Sias	Josh Randolph	-	-
2008	Michael Huerter	Leeza Wolfe	Jacob Fountain	Gabe Isbell	Tim Mierzejewski	Eric Wolfe and Gabe Isbell	Daniel Whitten	Daniel Whitten	Tim Maly	Kurt Hake	Steve Kamke	Steve Kamke	-	-
2007	Chad Soderstrom	Chad Soderstrom	Brad Coverdale	Ben Shadrick	Gabe Isbell	Tim Maly	Daniel Whitten	Daniel Whitten	Justin Alstad	Justin Alstad	Nathan Voigt	Nathan Voigt	N/A	N/A
2006	Claude Fong	Claude Fong	Sara Harris	Ben Shadrick	Chad Soderstrom	Tim Maly	Justin Alstad	Josh Pearson	Ross Lang	Ross Lang	Justin Alstad	Justin Alstad	N/A	N/A
2005	Seth Mick	Ben Shadrick	John Nesfeder	Emmanuel Echavarria	Justin Sangillo	Justin Sangillo	David Ebert	Ben Arp	Kevin Shride	Michael Garland	Adam Erickson	Justin Alstad	N/A	N/A
2004	Michael Bell	Michael Bell	Ken Shartle	Adam Erickson	Tim Maly	Roy Cannaday	Justin Alstad	Justin Sangillo	Joshua Hey	Joshua Hey	Joshua Hey	Joshua Hey	N/A	N/A
2003	Brad Dembo	Brad Dembo	Joshua Meneely	Brad Dembo	Kyle Hostutler	Kyle Hostutler	Evan Sauer	Eric Berkenpas	Eric Largent	Chris Bany	Joshua Hey	Joshua Hey	N/A	N/A
2002	Roy Cannaday	Roy Cannaday	Josiah Fiscus	Christian De Los Rios	Keith Bartram	Jesse Pfeister	Joshua Slinkard	Eric Beise	Bryon Hake	Chris Bany	Eric Kimmons	Chris Bany	N/A	N/A
2001	Dave Daugherty	Christopher Ramsey	Brandon Knick	Brandon Knick	Keith Bartram	Miguel Arriaga	Ron Sias	Juan Arriaga	Bryon Hake	Bryon Hake	Eric Kimmons	Art Middlekauff	N/A	N/A
2000	Nicholas Campbell	-	Aaron Torres	-	Tim Maly	-	Kevin Dulin	-	Eric Kimmons & Ron Sias (Tie)	-	Daniel Goodner	-	N/A	N/A
1999	Daniel Horton	-	Ron Sias	-	Keith Bartram	-	Lana F.	-	Eric Kimmons	-	Patrick Nolan	-	N/A	N/A
1998	Ron Sias	-	Ron Sias	-	Jordan Schwag	-	Ron Sias	-	Jordan Schwag	-	Peter Binis	-	N/A	N/A
1997	Joel Gorp	-	Joel Gorp	-	Stephen S. Stevens	-	Henry Pickle	-	Tommy Ullbnp	-	Stephen S. Stevens	-	N/A	N/A
1996	Jordan Schwag	-	Harold Hamdurgers	-	Harold Hamdurgers	-	Kyle Gloop	-	Fred Schwing	-	Eric Pumpernickel	-	N/A	N/A

== Reception ==
In the March 1996 edition of Arcane (Issue 4), Andrew Rilstone pointed out that "CCGs need variety. Redemption fails in this regard. The cards all have very similar values to each other, taking most of the fun out of collecting." He also criticized the gameplay, which he called "repetitive and boring". He concluded by giving it a rating of 5 out of 10, saying, "Each card has a relevant quotation on it, and the rules warn us that if the cards ever contradict the Bible, you should stick with the Bible. Er... thanks."

In the March 1996 edition of Dragon (Issue 227), Rick Swan stated that "Redemption plays like a stripped-down Magic: The Gathering game, too slight to sustain the interest of hard-core card players, but good for beginners."

== Reviews ==
- "It's time for Redemption". Scrye. No. 7. May–June 1995. p. 114.
- Anderson, Rob (July–August 1995). "Redemption: the start of a game company". Scrye. No. 8. pp. 116–117.
- Niebling, William V. (September–October 1995). "Finding paradise: deckbuilding in Redemption". Scrye. No. 9. pp. 96–97.
