= Brad McQuaid =

American businessman

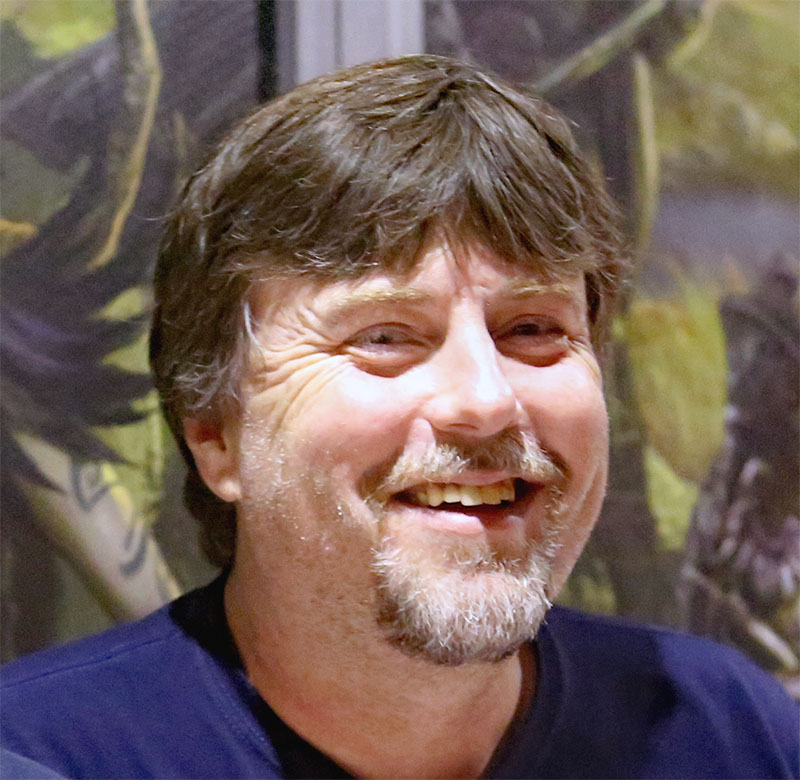
- McQuaid in 2017
- Born: April 25, 1969
- Died: November 18, 2019 (aged 50)
- Other name: Aradune Mithara
- Occupation: Video game designer
- Known for: EverQuest

Brad McQuaid (April 25, 1969 – November 18, 2019) was an American video game designer who was the key designer of EverQuest, a highly successful massively multiplayer online role-playing game (MMORPG) released in 1999. He later co-founded Sigil Games Online where he was CEO and executive producer of Vanguard: Saga of Heroes until Sony Online Entertainment's acquisition of Sigil Games Online in May 2007. On July 6, 2012, SOE announced the re-hiring of McQuaid to continue his work on Vanguard. On January 13, 2014, McQuaid announced his role of Chief Creative Officer at Visionary Realms, Inc. for the PC MMORPG, Pantheon: Rise of the Fallen.

== Biography ==
=== EverQuest ===
Brad McQuaid's start in the video game industry came in 1989 when he co-founded MicroGenesis with Steve Clover. In their free time they created WarWizard, a shareware role-playing video game that they released in 1993. McQuaid and Clover then developed a WarWizard 2 demo in 1995, which caught the attention of John Smedley of Sony Interactive Studios America. Smedley hired McQuaid and Clover in 1996 to work on an online role-playing game, later named EverQuest.

McQuaid started as the project's lead programmer but was made the producer and one of the lead designers. While EverQuest was being developed, Origin Systems launched Ultima Online in 1997 which became the top MMORPG. EverQuest became a huge hit and within months of its March 1999 launch it topped the subscription numbers held by Ultima Online. PC Gamer called McQuaid one of the "Next Game Gods" in its November 2000 issue, believing that he would eventually become one of the industry's most influential game developers. After Sony Online Entertainment acquired Verant Interactive, Brad McQuaid was promoted to Vice President of Premium Games and Chief Creative Officer.

=== Vanguard: Saga of Heroes ===
McQuaid left Sony to create Sigil Games with fellow game designer and EverQuest development team member Jeff Butler in January 2002. Several years later, McQuaid announced that Sigil would release a new next generation MMORPG. This game was given the name Vanguard: Saga of Heroes.

The game was released to the public in January 2007, five years after Sigil was founded.

On May 15, 2007, Sony Online Entertainment officially announced that it had purchased the key assets of Sigil Games Online. Brad McQuaid resigned from his position of leadership within Sigil and was given a role of creative consultant.

=== Later years ===
On July 6, 2012, Sony Online Entertainment announced the re-hiring of McQuaid to continue work on Vanguard including its free-to-play transition.

On March 6, 2013, McQuaid announced he had returned to working on EverQuest.

On September 9, 2013, McQuaid released a statement saying that he had left SOE, but would continue to work with them. This news, coupled with a string of hints dropped throughout Twitter and various message board posts, led the community to believe that McQuaid intended to work on a true spiritual successor to EverQuest and Vanguard independently. On January 13, 2014, the game was announced as Visionary Realms' Pantheon: Rise of the Fallen alongside a Kickstarter campaign, with McQuaid as chief creative officer.

McQuaid died at his home on November 18, 2019, aged 51. No public information about his cause of death was released.
