= Tempest of the Gods =

Collectible card game by Black Dragon Press

- Cardback of Tempest of the Gods CCG
- Publishers: Black Dragon Press
- Players: 2 or more
- Setup time: < 5 minutes
- Playing time: < 60 minutes

Tempest of the Gods is an out-of-print collectible card game by Black Dragon Press and was released in July 1995. The core set, called Limited Edition had 270 cards. It was a limited edition with cards having a gold-coloured border and produced in four rarities, sold in starter decks of 70 cards and booster packs of 15 cards. Signed and numbered cards were randomly inserted into packages.

Some artists that made art for Magic: the Gathering cards, such as Mark Poole, Susan Van Camp, Nene Thomas and Doug Shuler made cards for Tempest of the Gods as well. Tempest: Egyptian Neteru was an expansion for the game that never materialized.

The game is set in Darkurthe, a fantasy world based on a role-playing game of the same name in which factions duel for religious supremacy.

== Gameplay ==
Players act as avatars for their deity, attempting to establish the dominance of that deity's religion. Each player draws five cards and plays ("Summon") those that they can using their followers Faith. They "build the foundation of their mythos" in the Mortal Plane, at first basic cards such as peasants and farmers, and later more powerful cards representing their champions, steeds, and creatures that engage in battle. Any movement or attack is declared, though declaration of the target of the attack can be delayed until the attack is undertaken. Summoning Miracles and Spells can occur at any time during the player's turn, at the end of which the player discards the remainder of their cards, and draws a new set of five cards.

Initially, their followers are in 'Wander' status and can summon priests but are fully exposed to attacks. Upon discovering shrines, they may enter and obtain 'Occupancy' status, from which they gain partial protection from attacks. Temples provide greater protection for a larger number of followers, and offer special defenses. Priests can summon champions and monsters to protect the shrines and temples, which may then also enter the Battleground to defend their shrines and temples or from which they may attempt to enter an opponent's temples. Priests may also summon Gates, which enable a direct attack on shrines and temples without entering the Battlegound. When enough power has been accumulated in one temple, the player may summon a demi-god, and later, their deity.

A player wins by eliminating an opponents cards, by converting all opponents to the player's deity, or by accumulating a sufficiently large group of followers to permit the player to summon their deity to the Mortal Plane.

== Reception ==
Allen Varney of The Duelist said it was a "worse clone" of Magic: the Gathering.
