= Sigil Games Online =

American computer game developer

- Industry: Video games
- Founded: January 2002
- Founder: Brad McQuaid; Jeff Butler
- Defunct: May 15, 2007
- Fate: Acquired by Sony Online Entertainment
- Headquarters: Carlsbad, California, United States
- Products: Vanguard: Saga of Heroes

Sigil Games Online, Inc. was a video game developer based in Carlsbad, California that was founded in January 2002 by Brad McQuaid and Jeff Butler. The two had been key members of the development team that created EverQuest, the most popular massively multiplayer online role-playing game until World of Warcraft. McQuaid and Butler left Sony Online Entertainment (SOE), the publisher of EverQuest, and formed Sigil Games Online with the goal of developing "the next big thing". In 2003 McQuaid told IGN that he was "much happier" than he had been at SOE, where he felt "spread thin", now that he was working with "an all-star team" and "focusing on making one ground-breaking, unprecedented project". Following several delays and a change of publisher from Microsoft to SOE, Sigil released their only game, Vanguard: Saga of Heroes, on January 30, 2007. In May 2007, SOE acquired key assets of Sigil Games Online and became the game's owner.

== Vanguard: Saga of Heroes ==
McQuaid and Butler worked for Sony Online Entertainment on the team developing EverQuest. After their departure, they formed Sigil. In May 2002, Sigil reached an exclusive publishing deal with Microsoft, and they began work on Vanguard: Saga of Heroes. With the pedigree of an "all-star" team and the bravado of CEO Brad McQuaid, MMO fans and the press had high expectations.

An early marketing fact-sheet said that Vanguard would be set in a "vast", "seamless", and "immersive" virtual world filled with the trappings of high fantasy and rendered in cutting-edge graphics. It said the game would feature innovative static and dynamic content, building upon the strengths of earlier MMORPGs while correcting their weaknesses. Vanguard would promote interdependence, challenge, and reward while addressing camping, excessive downtime, and other issues.

At first Sigil worked with Microsoft to co-publish Vanguard, but less than a year before the game was scheduled to release the partnership dissolved. In May 2006, Sigil bought the rights to Vanguard back from Microsoft, at the same time arranging a co-publishing deal with Sony Online Entertainment. Vanguard: Saga of Heroes was released on January 30, 2007, co-published by Sigil and Sony Online Entertainment. Although pre-release coverage of the game had been positive the launch was followed by negative reviews.

== Acquisition ==
Sigil Games Online had around 150 employees at the time they released their only game, Vanguard: Saga of Heroes, on January 30, 2007. The development team continued to address the well-documented technical issues users experienced at launch for several months. Four months later, on May 14, the staff of Sigil Games Online were told to meet in the parking lot at 4:30PM and to take with them what they would need for the rest of the day. The employees were told that the launch of the game had not gone well, the company was in financial trouble and they were selling the company to Sony Online Entertainment. Director of Production, Andy Platter, then told the employees that they were all fired.

The following day, Sony Online Entertainment acquired Sigil's "key assets", stating that they will hire approximately fifty of Sigil's employees and that Brad McQuaid would be consultant to SOE as a creative advisor for Vanguard. Sony Online Entertainment's President John Smedley communicated the announcement to Vanguard's playerbase via the game's official forums.
