= Galactic Empires =

Card Game

- Galactic Empires card back design
- Designers: Carl Henry Schulte
- Publishers: Companion Games
- Players: 2 or more
- Setup time: none^{1}
- Playing time: 45 minutes up to 2 hours
- Chance: Some
- Skills: Card playing Arithmetic
- ^{1} Although the game itself takes no time to set up, each player must prepare his or her own deck, which can take anywhere upwards of half an hour.

Galactic Empires is an out-of-print collectible card game with a science fiction theme. It was published by Companion Games in 1994 until the company's bankruptcy in 1997.

== Publication history ==
Following the success of the first collectible card game (CCG), Wizards of the Coast's Magic: The Gathering in 1993, Galactic Empires by Companion Games was one of the "first wave" of CCGs that followed. The first cards, which can be difficult to find, were designed by Carl Schulte, with writing by Schulte and John Hammer, and art direction by Richard Rausch and Edward Beard Jr., and were released in August 1994. These cards were all reprinted in Series II Primary Edition released in December 1994, which consisted of 421 cards sold in 55-card starter decks and 12-card booster packs.

Companion Games filed for Chapter 11 bankruptcy in early 1996 and continued to release products during its reorganization. Numerous expansion sets and a revised core set (Series U Universe Edition) were released over the following two years; this ended abruptly when the company filed for Chapter 7 bankruptcy in May 1997. Designer Carl Schulte had expressed hope that Component Game Systems would purchase Companion Games and continue the game, but this did not happen.

Of the 3208 cards that were printed, several hundred were promotional cards, some of which are difficult to obtain today. By the time of the game's demise, at least 40 different empires (and 16 distinct "tribes" of one empire, the Indirigan Nomads) had been printed in varying numbers and levels of playability.

=== Sets and expansions ===
Sets and expansions were in English. A German version of Series II Primary Edition was released at about the same time as its English-language counterpart, but with fewer cards.

The set sizes in the table below have been compiled from checklists on the Internet and may be inaccurate. Many of the sets contain cards that are identical except for artwork and/or flavour text; for most sets these have been counted as separate cards. An exception was made for Series VIII, which has 100 distinct cards, among which 23 have 4 versions, 1 has 3 versions, and 1 has 2 versions, all but one of which have the same artwork and slightly different flavour text; so the die-hard collector would count 172 different cards. Some sets have cards for empires other than those listed, but not enough such to play these empires from that set alone.

The expansion set Realm of the Ancients and was planned for release in July 1997 to be sold in 5-card booster packs, and the second comedy set, Comedy Club Part 4 was planned for release in August 1997 to be sold in 100-card fixed starter decks.

Series	Set	Release date	Empires	Size
	"Alpha"	September 1994	Argonian, Krebiz	
Series I	"Beta"	October 1994	Argonian, Krebiz	90
Series II	Primary Edition	December 1994	Argonian, Bolaar, Corporate, Space Dragon, Indirigan, Krebiz, Mechad, Vektrean	441
Series III	New Empires	April 1995	Clydon, Plasma Occupied Territory/P.O.T., Scorpead, Tufor	210
Series IV	Powers of the Mind	July 1995	Filarian, Psycanti, Visonic	152
Series V	Time Gates	August 1995	Time Knight, Tranoan	157
Series U	Universe Edition	November 1995	Argonian, Clydon, Corporate, Space Dragon, Indirigan, Krebiz, Mechad, P.O.T., Scorpead, Tufor, Vektrean	565
Series VI	Advanced Technologies	November 1995		152
Series VII	Piracy	March 1996	Bolaar, Corporate Pirate, Indirigan, Leopan	204
Series VIII	Comedy Club	August 1996	Comedy Club Network	100/172
Series IX	Persona	November 1996		205
Series X	Invaders	January 1997	Aqaaran, Gekonauak, J'Xar, Orgon, Treglean, Zedan	260
Series XI	Allied Forces	April 1997	Drone, Erodi, Noble, Pakta'don, Paraloid, Shon-ti, Tarra'ki, Treglean, Trochilidae	145
	Promo and Premium cards		Aesthetic, Battle Birds, Collector	357 known

== Game play ==
As with all collectible card games, each player first purchases or obtains a basic deck of 55 cards, and then may supplement this by substituting cards from 15-card booster decks that contain a random assemblage of less powerful common cards and more powerful rare cards. When finished, the player's deck may still only contain 55 cards.

At the start of the game, each player is the leader of a sector of a galactic empire. The object of the game is to defend one's Sector HQ while destroying the other players' Sector HQs.

There are a variety of card types, the principal ones being resource-providing terrain (such as planets and moons) and resource-consuming ships, which can deal damage to opposing ships, terrain, and Sector HQs (and a variety of other card types). Each empire has its own unique trait, usually a weapon; there are also several "shipless" empires, for instance the Space Dragons and the Time Knights, that damage and defend using other means.

Each player draws nine random cards from their deck, laying down as much Terrain as they can. This generates Economy, Supply, Energy, Ammunition, Research, and Repair points, which are required to power units and various actions. Players can use Reaction cards at any time to interrupt the other player's actions. If a player succeeds in infiltrating the other player's defenses, the player may assault the enemy Sector Headquarters. Whoever has the last intact Headquarters wins.

== Reception ==
In the June 1995 edition of Dragon (Issue 218), Rick Swan was impressed by the sheer number of cards, commenting that "the stylish cards [...] are less notable for their graphics than for their staggering variety." He found that the rulebook "explains the mechanics in detail" but felt the "clunky writing" could have benefited from some editing. The one part of the game that Swan criticized was the "book-keeping", which use dice as markers to track many things during the game. As Swan noted, "We're talking a lot of dice here, and none come with the game." He concluded by giving the game an above-average rating of 5 out of 6, saying, "It's recommended only if (1) you're willing to put up with chunks of clunky writing, (2) you don't mind keeping track of all the points, and (3) you've got one or two bags of dice handy. With the freewheeling mythology and dizzying variety of options, you can easily lose yourself in Galactic Empire's goofy pleasures — it's like diving into a swimming pool of jelly beans."

== Reviews ==
- Review in Shadis
