= Michael Bacon (artist) =

American musician

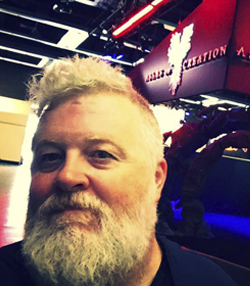
- Bacon at Pax West Expo 2018

Background information
- Born: May 15, 1968 (age 58); Tacoma, Washington, United States
- Genres: Alternative
- Occupations: director, designer, 2D/3D artist, animator, guitarist, composer
- Instruments: guitar, bass, keyboards, drums, violin
- Label: Reactor Records
- Website: www.michaelbacon.com

Michael Bacon (born 1968) is an American 3D artist/animator/designer/musician who has been working in the video game industry since 1996. He has worked on an array of large scale production game titles as Art Director/Lead Artist or Senior Artist with such companies as THQ, Sony Online Entertainment, Boss Game Studios, n-Space, Jaleco Inc, Volition, Hasbro Toy Company, and Aramat Productions.

== Game industry ==
Michael Bacon is currently Unemployed. He previously was Lead Environment Artist at Intrepid Studios working on Ashes of Creation. Before that, was Senior Artist at Sony Online Entertainment in San Diego, California working on the popular EverQuest 2 MMORPG franchise for the PC. Projects there include the international release of EverQuest II: Sentinel's Fate, EverQuest II: The Complete Collection, EverQuest II: The Shadow Odyssey, EverQuest II: Desert of Flames, EverQuest II: Kingdom of Sky, EverQuest II: Echoes of Faydwer, and EverQuest II: Rise of Kunark.

Bacon also worked with Volition contributing significantly to the Xbox 360 titles Saints Row and the Saints Row 2 sequel from publisher THQ.

== Music endeavors ==
He is also a rock guitar player/producer/musician contributing tracks to the WCW vs. nWo wrestling game franchise, Duke Nukem - Land of the Babes for GT Interactive, and the THQ fighting game "VS". Bacon has independent CD releases which including work with the 80s metal band Havuk, the 2006 release contributing tracks to the Madd Krakker "Saltine Dream" CD currently available at ITunes and other on-line distribution networks.

Bacon is also featured on Karlton Coffin's current CD release "3 Minutes of Fury".

== Production releases ==
Title	Release date	Platform	Publisher
New World	2021	PC, MMO	Amazon Game Studios
Ashes of Creation	Currently in Development	PC, MMO	Intrepid Studios
Ashes of Creation: apocalypse	Dec 2018 - Limited Release	PC, MMO	Intrepid Studios
EverQuest 2: Terrors of Thalumbra	Nov 2015	PC, MMO	Daybreak Games
EverQuest 2: Altar of Malice	Nov 2014	PC, MMO	Sony Online Entertainment
Retro Assault	Release Date: Jan 2015	IOs, Arcade	Big Shiny Games
EverQuest 2: Tears of Veeshan	Oct 2013	PC, MMO	Sony Online Entertainment
EverQuest 2: Chains of Eternity	November 2012	PC, MMO	Sony Online Entertainment
EverQuest 2: Age of Discovery	November 2011	PC, MMO	Sony Online Entertainment
EverQuest 2: Destiny of Velious	February 2011	PC, MMO	Sony Online Entertainment
EverQuest 2: Extended	July 2010	PC, MMO	Sony Online Entertainment
EverQuest 2: Sentinel's Fate	February 2010	PC, MMO	Sony Online Entertainment
EverQuest 2: The Complete Collection	November 2009	PC, MMO	Sony Online Entertainment
EverQuest 2: The Shadow Odyssey	November 2008	PC, MMO	Sony Online Entertainment
Saints Row 2	August 2008	Xbox 360	THQ
VectorBlast	March 8, 2008	PC, Net Jet	Hasbro Toy Company
EverQuest II: Rise of Kunark	November 13, 2007	PC, MMO	Sony Online Entertainment
EverQuest II: Echoes of Faydwer	November 15, 2006	PC, MMO	Sony Online Entertainment
Saints Row	August 19, 2006	Xbox 360	THQ
EverQuest II: Kingdom of Sky	February 28, 2006	PC, MMO	Sony Online Entertainment
EverQuest II: Desert of Flames	August 20, 2005	PC, MMO	Sony Online Entertainment
Goblin Commander	November 21, 2003	Xbox, PlayStation 2, GameCube	Jaleco Entertainment Inc
Trailer Park Tycoon	February 12, 2002	PC, CD-ROM	Jaleco Entertainment Inc
Duke Nukem: D-Day	May 2001	PlayStation 2	RockStar Games
Danger Girl	June 22, 2000	PlayStation	THQ
Duke Nukem: Land of the Babes	November 7, 2000	PlayStation	GT Interactive
WCW vs NWO	June 20, 1998	Nintendo 64	THQ
Vs.	May 12, 1998	PlayStation	THQ
Dead Unity	November 1997	PlayStation, PC Rom	THQ

== Discography ==
Title	Release date	Publisher
Michael Bacon: The Lost and the Beautiful	In Production	Reactor Records
Karlton Coffin: 3 Minutes of Fury	2010	Liquid Reality Studios
Kalrton Coffin: Ghost in the Glass	2008	Liquid Reality Studios
The Texas Doom Machine: Here Comes Trouble	2007	Reactor Records
Madd Krakker: Saltine Dream	2006	Reactor Records
Michael Bacon: Engraved Invitation (EP)	2003	Reactor Records
Michael Bacon: Unrequested Fission Surplus (EP)	1997	Reactor Records
Coffin: Hell in a Half Rack	1996	Zood Cru Records
