= EverQuest II: Rise of Kunark =

- Developer: Sony Online Entertainment
- Publishers: Sony Online Entertainment (US); Koch Media (EU)
- Platform: Windows
- Release: November 13, 2007
- Genre: MMORPG
- Mode: Multiplayer

EverQuest II: Rise of Kunark is the fourth EverQuest II expansion pack from Sony Online Entertainment. The expansion pack introduces a new continent, Kunark; a new player race, the Sarnak; and raises the level cap for adventure, tradeskills and guilds to 80.

== History of Kunark ==
Over the five hundred years transpired between the setting of the original EverQuest and EverQuest II, the continent of Kunark has changed in many important ways. The various cataclysms that occurred during this period in Norrath had a tangible impact on Kunark, with many areas of the geography being unrecognizable to those familiar with the continent from EverQuest.

The Iksar Empire is being rebuilt, with the giants being pushed towards the north of the continent, and the Sarnak, the new playable race, pushed towards the west, and their home city, Chardok. Upon arriving in Kunark, players will be immersed in a war between the powerful Iksar Empire and the other inhabitants of Kunark.

== The Sarnak ==
A render of the new player race, the Sarnak

The Sarnak in EverQuest were an NPC race that inhabited part of Kunark. In Rise of Kunark there are two distinct types of Sarnak: NPC characters who will be familiar to players of the original EverQuest; and the new, playable Sarnak, who were "magically engineered" to fight in the war against the Iksar Empire. These Sarnak were hunted by Iksar, who saw them as a threat against their rapidly growing empire. Thus, the remainder of these engineered Sarnak were hidden from the Iksar and have only just began to emerge.

The playable Sarnak begin in the lush jungle islands of Timorous Deep, where new Sarnak players attempt to rejoin their race, learn about their history and find their way to the city of Chardok. The eventual quest for Sarnak players is to help their race in the war against the Iksar, and the players will have to level in Timorous Deep, the Shattered Lands of the base game, the Desert of Flames, Kingdom of Sky and Echoes of Faydwer content, before finally being able to be reunited with their race and fight in the war against the Iksar.

== New features ==
A character in a dungeon in Rise of Kunark

Rise of Kunark brings several new features to EverQuest II. The expansion features considerably larger zones than any previous content in the game, consisting of large areas which are actually multiple zones with seamless transition between them.

Another feature of the expansion is that of epic weapons. Epic weapons were introduced in EverQuest with The Ruins of Kunark expansion pack, and allowed each player to complete a series of quests for a powerful magical weapon, unique to their particular class. Due to delays caused by the San Diego fires in late 2007, epic weapons weren't in Rise of Kunark at launch, but were added in a content update on February 6, 2008. According to the announcements, the difficulty in obtaining the epic weapons is due to the difficulty of the events, quests and encounters, but the epic weapons are not designed to be regarded as an entitlement that every member of a class will obtain, and that the series of quests, which includes solo, group and raid content requires effort and dedication.

As of Live Update 42, epic weapons have been added for each class, along with epic cloaks and earrings for each of the crafting classes. Each weapon has its own quest line, and requires both groups and raids to achieve the final item.

== Rise of Kunark zones ==
The coastline of the new starting zone, Timorous Deep

The new starting area is Timorous Deep and has content available for new characters from levels one to twenty. All Sarnak start in Timorous Deep, and newly created characters from any of the neutral races will have the option to begin in Timorous Deep. The zone consists of lush, jungle islands in the ocean known as Timorous Deep, and the city of Gorowyn.

The vast majority of the rest of the content is focused around the levels of 65 to 80, forming the new endgame content of the EverQuest II. Aside from Timorous Deep, new zones include:

Kylong Plains - consisting of the zones of Dreadlands, Burning Woods (now Stonewoods) and Firiona Vie from the original EverQuest expansion pack, The Ruins of Kunark.

Fens of Nathsar - consisting of The Ruins of Kunark zones Field of Bone, the Lake of Ill Omen and Swamp of No Hope.

Jarsath Wastes - containing the Overthere and Skyfire Mountains from The Ruins of Kunark.

Kunzar Jungle - containing Outer Sebilis, Outer City of Mist, Emerald Jungle and Trakanon's Teeth from The Ruins of Kunark.

New indoor areas and dungeons include Sebilis, Karnor's Castle, Veeshan's Peak, Charasis, Chardok and instanced persistent raid zones.
