= Legends of Norrath =

- Developer: Sony Online Entertainment
- Publisher: Sony Online Entertainment
- Designer: Paul Dennen
- Series: EverQuest
- Platforms: Microsoft Windows, macOS
- Release: WW: September 5, 2007
- Genre: Collectible card game
- Mode: Multiplayer

Legends of Norrath was an online digital collectible card game by Sony Online Entertainment. Legends of Norrath is based on the massively multiplayer online role-playing games EverQuest and EverQuest II. Legends Of Norrath was playable from within either of the two games, or via a stand-alone client.

Legends of Norrath was announced at the 2007 Sony Online Entertainment fan fair by (CEO) John Smedley. It was also previewed at the August 2007 Gen Con Game Fair. Legends of Norrath went online on September 5 of the same year.

Legends of Norrath was sunset on August 17, 2016.

== Gameplay ==
Oathbound was the first set in Legends of Norrath. There were 4 primary Archetypes of cards: Priest, Mage, Fighter, and Scout. There was one secondary Archetype, Neutral. This was only available with two free Avatars available during the release of Ethernauts and Travelers. Along with each Archetype was the ability to create a deck along a Light, Shadow or Neutral path. Each player included 4 quests in their deck (default ruleset) and at any given point in the game, each player had at least one quest in play, and each quest had a value level. As abilities were "used" in the game their value was applied to a quest. If a quest attained its level value from one player (over the course of many rounds) that quest was then achieved by that player and counted towards that player's progression of achieving 4 quests.

Winning was achieved by four means: defeating the opponent's avatar, completing 4 player quests, having the opponent run out of cards in his/her deck, or, during a chess clock match, having the opponent run out of time.

== Other features ==
In Legends of Norrath, players could fight in tournaments and gain loot cards for both EverQuest and EverQuest II. The interrelation between the MMO and the card game was considered unusual at the time. The tournaments awarded booster packs or rare cards to the winners, but were limited only to players located in the United States. Players could also choose to create their own avatar, a highly desired feature. Players could pick from 21 races: Human, Wood Elf, Dark Elf, Dwarf, Gnome, Ogre, High Elf, Iksar, Halfling, Troll, Froglok, Erudite, Barbarian, Half Elf, Fae, Arasai, Drakkin, Sarnak, Kerra, Ratonga, or Vah Shir. Players could pick from one male or one female from any of the listed races before answering a questionnaire that determined the avatar's stats. After players bought cards from the online store, they could trade cards with other players. There was also a single player version of the game: a story line that featured battles against the AI. Winning each chapter of the single player story line awarded one card to the player. With the Ethernauts set, players could earn two different sets of cards (based on archetype) for each scenario as well as a loot card for beating Ethernauts scenarios 1, 3, 5, 7, and 10.

== Expansions ==
Legends of Norrath had 16 sets released between September 2007 and August 2013. Each one featured a number of base cards which could be found in either starter or booster packs, as well as promotional cards and special loot cards which could grant items in either EverQuest or EverQuest II. They would feature characters, locations, and monsters featured in both games, and would sometimes have story arcs revolving around a current expansion or key points in the history of the EverQuest series. Sets were originally released at a rate of one every 3–4 months until Debt of the Ratonga, which debuted almost a year after the previous mini set The Jarsath Destroyer. The final set, Drakkinshard, released 8 months later, would be the last one produced until the game's closure in August 2016.

Set #	Title	Release date	Cards
1	Oathbound	September 5, 2007	375
2	Forsworn	December 19, 2007	230
3	Inquisitor	March 7, 2008	250
4	Oathbreaker	June 19, 2008	250
5	Ethernauts	October 9, 2008	280
6	Against the Void	February 12, 2009	280
7	Storm Break	July 9, 2009	240
8	Travelers	October 13, 2009	210
9	Vengeful Gods	February 23, 2010	180
10	Doom of the Ancient Ones	June 15, 2010	200
11	Dragonbrood - The Anarchs	October 14, 2010	200
12	Legacies	March 1, 2011	165 (Note: 51 new cards plus 114 reprints from previous sets.)
13	Priestess of the Anarchs	August 25, 2011	95 (Note: 70 new cards plus 25 reprints from previous sets.)
14	The Jarsath Destroyer (Note: A mini expansion which added 10 new cards to the Priestess of the Anarchs set and was not available via chosen pack.)	December 21, 2011	10
15	Debt of the Ratonga	December 6, 2012	110
16	Drakkinshard	August 13, 2013	120
