= EverQuest Legends =

2026 video game

- Developers: Daybreak Game Company; Game Jawn
- Publisher: Daybreak Game Company
- Platform: Microsoft Windows
- Release: WW: July 28, 2026
- Genre: MMORPG
- Mode: Multiplayer

EverQuest Legends is a massively multiplayer online role-playing game developed by independent studio Game Jawn in collaboration with Daybreak Game Company. Based on Daybreak's 1999 MMORPG EverQuest, EverQuest Legends reworks the original game's content and presentation around a substantially altered ruleset intended to accommodate solo and small-group play. It was released for Windows on July 28, 2026.

The game retains the original EverQuest visual style, zones, music, spells, and much of its equipment and other content while introducing new progression systems and quality-of-life features. Among its major departures from EverQuest are the ability for a single character to use as many as three character classes simultaneously, an equipment upgrade and customization system, smaller maximum group and raid sizes, and changes intended to make progression less dependent on large groups.

== Gameplay ==
EverQuest Legends is set in the fantasy world of Norrath. Its core gameplay retains characteristics of the original game, including traversing interconnected zones while strengthening the player's character through completing quests, slaying monsters, and obtaining progressively more powerful equipment . Unlike the heavily group-oriented gameplay focus of early EverQuest, Legends was designed with content which could be completed by solo players. Multiplayer features remain available, with groups supporting up to four players and raids supporting up to eight.

The title launched with the continents of Antonica, Faydwer and Odus. It uses the original 1999 graphics and assets of EverQuest, including character models, environments, spell effects, loot and music. The developers emphasized that preservation of the game's initial artistic style as important to retaining the identity of classic EverQuest.

=== Notable changes ===
EverQuest Legends received a number of new features and modifications compared to the original release to accommodate players not wishing to commit to traditional lengthy group sessions. These include various quality-of-life changes to death mechanics, an in-game map, and a revised interface which can scale to higher resolutions than the original.

Players now have the ability to "multiclass" their characters, selecting up to three active classes simultaneously to receive the combined abilities of each, resulting in 560 possible combinations. This results in characters which are considerably more powerful than their classic counterparts, allowing solo players to potentially defeat encounters which required an entire group. In addition to the twelve races available at the launch of EverQuest in 1999, Legends also includes Iksar, Frogloks and Kerrans.

Equipment progression was redesigned to allow weapons and armor to be upgraded through enhancement levels, increasing their effectiveness. Additionally, equipment may be customized by adding additional effects, increasing their power and flexibility without having to rely exclusively on finding new items.

== Development ==
EverQuest Legends was developed by independent studio Game Jawn in collaboration with Daybreak Game Company. The project was publicly announced on March 24, 2026, with executive producer David Youssefi describing it as a long-standing personal project to develop a solo-friendly version of EverQuest. Game Jawn was founded by developers with backgrounds in the EverQuest fan community, and the development team described the project as an attempt to preserve the distinctive characteristics of the original game while redesigning systems around a more flexible style of play.

The project was built using the original EverQuest as its foundation rather than recreating the game in a modern engine, with interest in testing exceeded 40,000 beta registrations by May 2026. A preorder open beta began on July 1, 2026. It was designed to operate as a live-service title, with Daybreak announcing plans for additional downloadable content and expansions. Prior to launch, the developers stated that planned post-release content included player housing, a player auction house, Nektropos Castle and content based on Kunark. It included an in-game store, with race and class unlocks which could be earned through gameplay as well as available for purchase along with cosmetic items.

== Expansion ==
On November 10, 2026, Daybreak Games announced an expansion pack for EverQuest Legends called Rulers of Kunark, set for release on December 8 of that year. The expansion features the return of the continent of Cabilis with revamped zones, additional equipment upgrades, and an auction house.

== Reception ==
Reviews of the game focused on the comparison of the intentionally demanding design of the original title and Legend's more streamlined design. Russell Adderson of PC Gamer remarked that while the drastic increase in individual player power affected the feel of the game, its multiclass feature and ability to defeat groups of enemies on one's own was satisfying. The publication found that it retained the initial version's complexity and archaic design while removing some of its harsher elements, ultimately declaring that its purposefully retro design would likely appeal primarily to a niche audience interested in early MMORPGs.

RPG Site described the project as an effort to recreate the nostalgia of the 1999 game while adjusting it for a more casual experience, emphasizing the development team's attempts to retain the original game's identity rather than simply modernizing it into a contemporary MMORPG. Commentators compared EverQuest Legends with fan-operated projects such as Project 1999, which preserve earlier versions of EverQuest. PC Gamer distinguished Legends as being a more forgiving reinterpretation of the classic game rather than a strict recreation.
