= EverQuest II expansions =

2004 video game expansions

Cover art for the first EverQuest II expansion pack, Desert of Flames

Numerous expansions for the MMORPG EverQuest II have been released, as well as three Adventure Packs.

With EverQuest II, Sony Online Entertainment introduced the concept of Adventure Packs. Adventure Packs are meant to be smaller "mini-expansions" to the game, adding a plot line with several zones, new creatures and items to the game via digital download with a smaller fee. As time went on, however, the development team has decided to release free zones and content instead of including them in Adventure Packs. Some recent releases include a new starting city, Neriak, with a new starting race, Arasai; and new high level dungeons The Throne of New Tunaria and the Estate of Unrest.

Until 2011, expansions were available in both DVD and digital formats, but can now be downloaded through a digital service. The digital versions often come with a bonus features such as a creature that the player can put in their in-game house. Expansions generally introduce many new zones with many plot lines, new features, many new creatures and items, new cities, and often come with a boost in the level cap or a new player race. While it may be easier to download the expansions digitally, traditional retail offers more content.

== Expansion packs ==
=== Desert of Flames (2005) ===
EverQuest II: Desert of Flames
- Developer: Sony Online Entertainment
- Publishers: NA: Sony Online Entertainment; EU: Ubisoft; JP: Square Enix; AS: Gamania
- Release: September 13, 2005

Desert of Flames is the first expansion for EverQuest II. It featured a new land mass to explore, PvP arenas, a level increase from 50 to 60, a new climb ability and new items and monsters. The major quest line for the expansion is commonly known as "The Peacock Line" - the series of 17 or so quests culminates with a raid requiring the player to group up with his guildmates to slay an entity known as "The Godking".

Players can choose from a selection of rewards to be used in the weapon slot depending on their class, for example a mage would receive an item named "Wand of Second life" which can also be changed at will into a two-handed weapon - "Staff of Second life". This quest takes place throughout the Desert of Ro from the sinking sands to the living tombs and eventually the Silent City.

New zones include the Sinking Sands, Pillars of Flame, Clefts of Rujark and the dervish city of Maj'Dul. Also many instances such as Poets Palace and Shimmering Citadel are available with Desert of Flames.

Desert of Flames holds a 79% rating on GameRankings.

=== Kingdom of Sky (2006) ===
EverQuest II: Kingdom of Sky
- Developer: Sony Online Entertainment
- Publishers: NA: Sony Online Entertainment; EU: Ubisoft
- Release: February 21, 2006

Kingdom of Sky featured a new region to explore, located high above the skies of Norrath, known as the Overrealm. It included a new level cap of 70 for adventurers and artisans, new items and quests, new monsters to fight, alternate ways of advancing the player's character (achievement points) and the ability to increase a guild to level 50.

Purchase of the expansion granted each character in any account that bought the expansion an Aviak hatchling. If the expansion was bought in a brick and mortar store, the account was also granted one Carnivorous plant. The Carnivorous Plant acts as a house pet which can be fed items from the world, and depending on what is fed to it, will yield a useful item.

The Overrealm is composed of floating islands which originate from the Plane of Sky. Transportation to the Overrealm works like in The Shadows of Luclin; when a player wishes to go there, he or she obtains a teleportation shard from the overseer of a wizard spire on the ground. The overseer NPC then grants to the player character a teleportation shard which flags the player as one wanting to go to the Overrealm. Every five minutes, the spires activate, sending player characters to the Overrealm. If a player originates in Antonica or the Commonlands, he or she will be sent to the Tenebrous Tangle. If a player originates in the Thundering Steppes or Nektulos Forest, then he or she is sent to the Barren Sky. If the player originates in the Enchanted Lands or the Feerrott, he or she is sent to the Bonemire.

As with both the original game and the first expansion, a new epic quest line is included called the "Claymore" line. The start of this quest line can be completed solo in the outdoor areas, but it will soon require a group and many segments require large investments of time "camping" where the NPCs will spawn and gain quest updates. The last parts of this quest must be completed within a raid (a group of 7+ players), the first being in an area known as "Ascent of the Awakened" in which the players must have two groups (12 players). The final part takes place in Deathtoll, a zone intended for four groups (24 players), and requires an epic access quest in itself to enter. In the end players choose from an archetype specific reward (in some cases there are multiple choices).

Once a player has installed this expansion pack and reaches adventuring level 10, a character is granted achievement experience through discovering new areas, finding precious treasure and status items, killing monsters with specific names, completing select quests, and completing certain collections of items.

Kingdom of Sky holds a 78% rating on GameRankings.

=== Echoes of Faydwer (2006) ===
EverQuest II: Echoes of Faydwer
- Developer: Sony Online Entertainment
- Publishers: NA: Sony Online Entertainment; EU: Koch Media
- Release: November 13, 2006

Echoes of Faydwer introduced a new playable race (the Fae), the ability for player characters to equip visible cloaks, a second equipable earring slot, and add adornments (player-made enchantments) to existing items, 24 new subclass specific achievement trees, two new secondary tradeskill professions, and the return of the gods to the mortal realm. It also introduced a new starting city, the tree city of Kelethin, along with new overland, dungeon, instance and raid zones. There are zones for all levels of characters in this expansion.

The expansion raised the achievement point cap to 100 and the guild level to 60. The expansion also included 6 new Heritage quests and new races to combat like the clockworks, kobolds and bugbears.

The boxed retail edition of Echoes of Faydwer includes the base game plus the first two expansions: Desert of Flames and Kingdom of Sky.

Echoes of Faydwer holds a 84% rating on GameRankings.

=== Rise of Kunark (2007) ===
EverQuest II: Rise of Kunark
- Developer: Sony Online Entertainment
- Publishers: NA: Sony Online Entertainment; EU: Koch Media
- Release: November 13, 2007

Rise of Kunark is the fourth EverQuest II expansion pack. It introduces a new continent, Kunark; a new player race, the Sarnak; and raises the level cap for adventure, tradeskills and guilds to 80. The expansion also adds new Class specific AA Tab.

Rise of Kunark holds a 83% rating on Metacritic.

=== The Shadow Odyssey (2008) ===
EverQuest II: The Shadow Odyssey
- Developer: Sony Online Entertainment
- Publishers: NA: Sony Online Entertainment; EU: Koch Media
- Release: November 18, 2008

The Shadow Odyssey is the fifth EverQuest II expansion pack. It contains content intended for levels 50–80. The expansion also gives access to all previous released expansions and adventure packs. The expansion introduces an additional achievement tree for each character class, 18 goal-based dungeons with a reward system for earning new equipment, new deities and raids. The expansion adds new Shadows AA Tab with 4 lines - Common, Class type (Mages), archetype (Wizard/Warlocks), Class Specific (Wizard).

The Shadow Odyssey holds a 78% rating on Metacritic.

=== Sentinel's Fate (2010) ===
EverQuest II: Sentinel's Fate
- Developer: Sony Online Entertainment
- Publisher: Sony Online Entertainment
- Release: February 16, 2010

Sentinel's Fate is the sixth EverQuest II expansion pack. It raises the level cap from 80 to 90. The expansion also gives access to all previous released expansions and adventure packs. The expansion includes 2 new overland zones, 12 new dungeons, 400 new quests, over 2,000 more items, and hundreds of new monsters. The expansion adds new AA options to "Kingdom of Sky" and "Echo of Faydwer" trees.

Michael Lafferty from GameZone.com gave it a score of 7/10, commending a new content and "compelling" story elements. Nick Kolan from IGN gave the expansion a rating of 7.2 out of 10; while positive to new content, he said that the pack did not brought the excitement.

=== Destiny of Velious (2011) ===
EverQuest II: Destiny of Velious
- Developer: Sony Online Entertainment
- Publisher: Sony Online Entertainment
- Release: February 22, 2011

Destiny of Velious is the seventh EverQuest II expansion pack. The expansion also gives access to all previous released expansions and adventure packs. The expansion includes 2 new overland zones, 10 new dungeons, 300 new quests, over 1,000 more items, and more than 30 new monsters. The expansion also introduces flying mounts. The game brings a new archetype Heroic AA tab.

=== Age of Discovery (2011) ===
EverQuest II: Age of Discovery
- Developer: Sony Online Entertainment
- Publisher: Sony Online Entertainment
- Release: December 6, 2011

Age of Discovery is the eighth EverQuest II expansion pack. In tandem with the launch of this expansion, SOE also converted EQ2 into a fully free-to-play MMO. Free players were restricted in what they could access and utilize, while players were able to upgrade to "Silver" level membership for a small one-time fee to get more access. A "Gold" membership cost the same as the existing monthly subscription plan, and gave full access to all areas and features.

The expansion itself added the Beastlord class from the original EverQuest, new Reforging and Tradeskill Apprentice systems, hireable mercenary assistants, and the Dungeon Maker system allowing players to create their own shareable dungeons.

=== Chains of Eternity (2012) ===
EverQuest II: Chains of Eternity
- Developer: Sony Online Entertainment
- Publisher: Sony Online Entertainment
- Release: November 13, 2012

Chains of Eternity is the ninth expansion to EverQuest II. This expansion contains features such as level increases, the Guild level cap raised to 95, Player level cap 95 and Tradeskill cap to 95, prestige abilities and game items only available in this expansion. Each subclass gets an access to new Prestige Abilities.

=== Tears of Veeshan (2013) ===
EverQuest II: Tears of Veeshan
- Developer: Sony Online Entertainment
- Publisher: Sony Online Entertainment
- Release: November 12, 2013

Tears of Veeshan is the tenth expansion to EverQuest II. It features placing heroes among the dragon dead in the Eternal Broodlands. AA limit is increased to 340 and new Dragon tree is added.

=== Altar of Malice (2014) ===
EverQuest II: Altar of Malice
- Developer: Sony Online Entertainment
- Publisher: Sony Online Entertainment
- Release: November 11, 2014

Altar of Malice, the eleventh expansion pack, includes several new zones, one new playable race, several new avatars, new raids, and a raise in level cap to 100. The expansion adds new prestige sub class tab.

=== Terrors of Thalumbra (2015) ===
EverQuest II: Terrors of Thalumbra
- Developer: Daybreak Game Company
- Publisher: Daybreak Game Company
- Release: November 17, 2015

Terrors of Thalumbra is the twelfth expansion pack to EverQuest II that was released on November 17, 2015. The expansion offers max-level characters a new underground zone for exploring and questing, new signature quest lines for both adventurers and crafters, new creatures, a large contested zone, and new dungeons (six advanced solo, 13 heroic, three x4 raids, and one x2 raid). The expansion also has content for those below level 100, including level-agnostic dungeons (scaling from levels 20 to 94), a revamped deity system, new best-in-slot relics, and a new item infusion upgrade system.

=== Kunark Ascending (2016) ===
EverQuest II: Kunark Ascending
- Developer: Daybreak Game Company
- Publisher: Daybreak Game Company
- Release: November 15, 2016

Kunark Ascending is the thirteenth expansion pack to EverQuest II that was released on November 15, 2016. The expansion features 1 new overland zone, 12 new heroic zones, 8 solo zones, 4 advanced solo zones, 6 raid zones, over 50 solo quests, over 65 collection quests, an "Epic 2.0" signature quest for each adventure archetype, 4 new Ascension classes (a new way to customize combat), new tradeskill recipes and tradeskill signature quests, gear to upgrade mercenaries, a wardrobe feature to organize appearance gear, and updates to the combat UI (User Interface).

=== Planes of Prophecy (2017) ===
EverQuest II: Planes of Prophecy
- Developer: Daybreak Game Company
- Publisher: Daybreak Game Company
- Release: November 28, 2017

Planes of Prophecy is the fourteenth expansion pack to EverQuest II that was released on November 28, 2017.

The game features:

- New dungeons for Solo, Heroic, and Raid players.
- Soulbound Weapons – a new weapon type that gains experience and levels up, increasing in power.
- Increased Level Cap – adventure up to 110.
- Ascension Levels – the players can ascend to level 15.
- Mercenary Levels – mercenaries can level up to 10.
- Tradeskill Levels – the players can craft up to 110.

=== Chaos Descending (2018) ===
EverQuest II: Chaos Descending
- Developer: Daybreak Game Company
- Publisher: Daybreak Game Company
- Release: November 13, 2018

Chaos Descending is the fifteenth expansion pack to EverQuest II and was released on November 13, 2018. Like the Planes of Prophecy, the story sees the player being tasked to restore order to the Elemental Planes which first appeared in the original EverQuest's The Planes of Power expansion. The content is focused primarily on four new outdoor zones: The Planes of Fire (Doomfire, the Burning Lands), Earth (Vegarlson, the Earthen Badlands), Air (Eryslai, the Kingdom of Wind), and Disease (Detroxxulous, the Plaguelands), as well as dungeon content based in the Plane of Water (Awuidor, the Unresting Waters) and a questing hub in the Plane of Knowledge (Myrist, The Great Library). New features for the game include new quests for adventurers and crafters, new solo, heroic, and raid zones, and the ability to equip mounts and mercenaries with gear to gain added bonuses.

Two months leading to the release of the expansion, Daybreak Games launched an "Against the Elements" event in EverQuest II where players could take on quests revolving around rampaging elemental creatures. In their review of the expansion, MMORPG.com gave the game a 7.5 out of 10 rating. Writer Paul Eno commented that while it had a good amount of new content and a "fun and adventurous" story, he found that the new additions to the Ascension class system introduced in Kunark Ascending only added to the already high number of abilities characters had accumulated over the past several years and may put off new players. Combat was also seen as slow and "borders on monotony", which would be best experienced with a group rather than playing solo.

=== Blood of Luclin (2019) ===
EverQuest II: Blood of Luclin
- Developer: Daybreak Game Company
- Publisher: Daybreak Game Company
- Release: December 17, 2019

Blood of Luclin is the sixteenth expansion pack for EverQuest II and was released on December 17, 2019. The story involves players returning to the moon of Luclin, the destruction of which originally led to the destruction of Norrath's surface. New features include an increased level cap from 110 to 120, new zones which include solo and raid content, and an "overseer" feature which allows the player to recruit agents to perform tasks.

=== Reign of Shadows (2020) ===
EverQuest II: Reign of Shadows
- Developer: Daybreak Game Company
- Publisher: Daybreak Game Company
- Release: December 15, 2020

Reign of Shadows is the seventeenth expansion for EverQuest II. A continuation of the story of Blood of Luclin, the plot involves players returning to the dark side of the moon of Luclin to face the snake-like Shissar race led by Emperor Ssraeshza. The expansion features zones which first appeared in the original EverQuest expansion Shadows of Luclin in 2001, as well as the return of the cat-like Vah Shir as a playable race. New content includes new solo, raid, and quest areas along with a revamp of the Alternate Advancement character progression system.

=== Visions of Vetrovia (2021) ===
EverQuest II: Visions of Vetrovia
- Developer: Daybreak Game Company
- Publisher: Daybreak Game Company
- Release: December 1, 2021

Visions of Vetrovia is the eighteenth expansion for EverQuest II, released in December 2021. Set after the events of the previous two expansions, on the moon of Luclin, Visions returns players to Norrath where Captain Douglan Wakerunner and the Far Seas Trading Company lead adventurers though the Shattered Sea seeking uncharted lands. It features an increased level cap to 125, new solo, heroic, and raid content, and adventure zones in the previously undiscovered land of Vetrovia. The release was preceded by an event which ran from September to October where players could earn increased loot drops, experience, and currency to prepare for the expansion itself.

=== Renewal of Ro (2022) ===
EverQuest II: Renewal of Ro
- Developer: Daybreak Game Company
- Publisher: Daybreak Game Company
- Release: November 30, 2022

Renewal of Ro is the nineteenth expansion for EverQuest II, released on November 30, 2022. The expansion features the return to the island of Ro where players explore new zones located on its southern half while assisting the dragon-touched Aerakyn race. It features new areas, abilities, dungeons, and raids, as well as teleporters for fast travel.

=== Ballads of Zimara (2023) ===
EverQuest II: Ballads of Zimara
- Developer: Daybreak Game Company
- Publisher: Daybreak Game Company
- Release: November 29, 2023

Ballads of Zimara was released on November 29, 2023. The expansion takes place in the Plane of Sky, where players investigate disturbances involving the djinn and the region's inhabitants. It raises the adventuring and tradeskill level caps from 125 to 130 and introduces new quests, collections, achievements, solo and heroic dungeons, and raid encounters. Additional gameplay features include Advanced Research, which allows players to pursue character improvements through research, and Chrono Dungeons, which revisit earlier encounters with updated challenges and rewards. It features an increased level cap to 130 with five new Adventure and Tradeskill levels.

=== Scars of Destruction (2024) ===
EverQuest II: Scars of Destruction
- Developer: Daybreak Game Company
- Publisher: Daybreak Game Company
- Release: November 20, 2024

Scars of Destruction was released on November 20, 2024. The expansion returns players to the continent of Velious, where they investigate the ambitions of Lucan D'Lere, the Overlord of Freeport, and his pursuit of a powerful artifact connected to the continent's ancient history. It introduces new quests, collections, achievements, solo and heroic dungeons, and raid encounters. Additional features include the Petamorph Key Ring, which provides dedicated storage for items that alter the appearance of summoned pets, and Weapon Auras, which allow players to customize the visual effects displayed by their weapons.

=== Rage of Cthurath (2025) ===
EverQuest II: Rage of Cthurath
- Developer: Daybreak Game Company
- Publisher: Daybreak Game Company
- Release: December 10, 2025

Rage of Cthurath was released on December 10, 2025. Set within the Void, the expansion follows players as they confront Cthurath, the Consumer, and assist the inhabitants of the otherworldly realm against his forces. It raises the adventuring and tradeskill level caps to 135 and introduces new quests, spells, combat abilities, dungeons, and raid encounters. Notable additions include Guild Coalitions, allowing characters to participate in two guilds simultaneously; the Illusion Key Ring, which provides dedicated storage for appearance illusions; Void Incursion public quests; and Untold Heroic Dungeons, which offer progressively challenging encounters and rewards.

=== Descent to Val'Zyoth (2026) ===
EverQuest II: Descent to Val'Zyroth
- Developer: Daybreak Game Company
- Publisher: Daybreak Game Company
- Release: 2026

Descent to Val'Zyroth is the twenty-third expansion for EverQuest II, scheduled for release in 2026. The expansion takes place in the subterranean regions of Norrath, where players become involved in a conflict surrounding Queen Cristanos of Neriak and her ambitions to conquer Freeport. It introduces new adventuring and tradeskill quests, solo and group dungeons, raid encounters, and an epic mount obtainable through a scavenger hunt. Its principal gameplay addition is the Personas system, which allows players to develop multiple character classes on a single character. Beta testing and preorders began on October 13, 2026.

== Adventure packs ==
Title	Release date	Notes
The Bloodline Chronicles	March 21, 2005	Centered on a conflict involving vampires, it introduced separate storylines for good- and evil-aligned characters, alongside solo, group, and raid encounters. Additional features included vampire-themed spells and equipment.
The Splitpaw Saga	June 28, 2005	Set within a network of caverns inhabited by gnolls, it featured level-scaling encounters for characters between levels 20 and 50. Its dungeons included puzzles involving movable objects, alongside quests and group challenges.
The Fallen Dynasty	June 14, 2006	Set in a region influenced by East Asian mythology and architecture, it offered content for characters between levels 55 and 70. It included solo and group questlines, heroic and raid encounters, and crafting rewards.
Rum Cellar	April 28, 2015	Featuring a pirate-themed storyline set within a network of distilleries, it introduced solo, group, and raid encounters for level 100 characters. Unlike earlier adventure packs, it required ownership of the Altar of Malice expansion.

== The Complete Collection ==
On October 22, 2009, Sony Online Entertainment released EverQuest II: The Complete Collection, a retail bundle which included the base game, the first three adventure packs, and the first six expansions up to The Shadow Odyssey. The package also came with 500 Station Cash to use in the in-game digital store, and 60 days of free game time. The Complete Collection was the fifth-highest-selling PC game in North America for the week of November 5-12 of the same year.
