= EverQuest Online Adventures =

2003 video game

- Original box art
- Developer: Sony Online Entertainment
- Publishers: NA: Sony Online Entertainment; PAL: Sony Computer Entertainment
- Composers: Jeremy Soule; Inon Zur (additional music)
- Platform: PlayStation 2
- Release: NA: February 11, 2003; PAL: October 24, 2003; Frontiers: NA: November 18, 2003
- Genre: MMORPG
- Mode: Multiplayer

EverQuest Online Adventures (EQOA) is a discontinued 2003 massively multiplayer online role-playing game (MMORPG) developed and published by Sony Online Entertainment for the PlayStation 2. The game is part of the EverQuest franchise and was shut down on March 29, 2012, after nine years of operation.

An expansion pack was launched on November 18, 2003, titled EverQuest Online Adventures: Frontiers; it added a playable race—the Ogre—and character class—Alchemist—as well as many quests and items.

== Setting and gameplay ==
EverQuest Online Adventures was set in the fictional world of Norrath 500 years prior to the original EverQuest, in the "Age of Adventure". The world featured many places familiar to fans of the original and most of the differences were explained in the lore of EverQuest. The gameplay focused on character advancement, environment combat, quests, exploration, grouping, and socializing. It also contained a simple PVP system that allowed two players to fight one another.

There were fifteen playable classes and ten races.

== Development ==
Frontiers cover art

EverQuest Online Adventures was developed and published by Sony Online Entertainment (SOE), and first released on February 11, 2003, in North America. The game was developed so that it did not require a hard disk drive (HDD) like Final Fantasy XI did. Since no HDD for the system was ever released in PAL territories, EQOA remained the only MMORPG there.

EverQuest Online Adventures: Frontiers was launched on November 18, 2003. Frontiers added a playable race—the Ogre—and character class—Alchemist—as well as many quests and items.

The continued development of content after the first expansion was introduced as free content updates instead of additional expansion packs.

EverQuest Online Adventures was shut down on March 29, 2012. In spite of this, there are replacement online servers available restoring online functionality to the game.
