= EverQuest II =

2004 video game

- Developer: Sony Online Entertainment
- Publishers: NA: Sony Online Entertainment; EU: Ubisoft; JP: Square Enix
- Producer: John R. Blakely
- Designers: Rich Waters; Chris Cao; Joseph Russo
- Programmers: Scott Hartsman; Richard A. Baker; Jon L. Davis
- Artists: Joe Shoopack; Stuart Compton; William B. Yeatt
- Composers: Laura Karpman; Inon Zur (additional music)
- Platform: Microsoft Windows
- Release: NA: November 8, 2004; EU: November 12, 2004
- Genre: MMORPG
- Mode: Multiplayer

EverQuest II is a 3D fantasy massively multiplayer online role-playing game (MMORPG) originally developed and published by Sony Online Entertainment for Microsoft Windows PCs and released in November 2004. It is the sequel to the original EverQuest, released five years earlier, and features updated graphics and more streamlined gameplay compared to the previous entry, as well as an abundance of voice acting with contributions from actors such as Christopher Lee and Heather Graham. In February 2015, Sony Online Entertainment's parent corporation Sony Computer Entertainment sold it to investment company Inception Acquisitions, where it continues to develop and publish the game under its new name, Daybreak Game Company.

The game is set in an alternate future 500 years after the events of the first EverQuest, and is meant to run alongside its predecessor without interfering with the original story. It features characters and locations from the original that have been altered by centuries of war and cataclysmic destruction. While the title did receive favorable reviews upon release, it was notably less influential to the genre than the previous installment, and it faced heavy competition from other MMORPGs, such as World of Warcraft, which was released two weeks after EverQuest II. While originally subscription-based since its launch, a free-to-play version with its own dedicated server was released in July 2010 called EverQuest II Extended. In November 2011, the subscription service was cancelled in favor of making all remaining servers free-to-play with microtransactions as the revenue stream.

== Gameplay ==
Within EverQuest II, each player creates a character to interact in the 3D, fictional world of Norrath. The character can adventure (complete quests, explore the world, kill monsters and gain treasures and experience) and socialize with other players. The game also has a 'tradeskill' system that allows players to create items for in-game use. Players can make items such as spells, potions, armor and many other items. The player chooses their character's race and type, which affects their abilities. Characters collect experience to advance in level. EverQuest II enables social interaction with other players through grouping and the creation of guilds. Like players, guilds can gain experience and levels, partially from players completing special tasks called Heritage quests, but primarily from guild-oriented quests and tasks called "writs", and gaining guild experience by killing epic monsters. Higher guild levels open up special rewards unavailable to non-guilded characters, and cause certain other rewards to cost less. These rewards include housing options, mounts, house items, apparel, and special titles. Although EverQuest II focuses on player versus environment (PvE), dedicated player versus player (PvP) servers were added in February 2006. EverQuest II has a heavy focus on quests; more than 6,000 exist. The EverQuest II feature set has expanded since its release in 2004.

Players must choose a 'race' when creating a character. The choice of races include human, barbarian, dwarf, erudite, ogre, iksar, troll, gnome, half elf, high elf, halfling, Vah Shir, wood elf and dark elf (which were available in the original EverQuest) along with new options such as the Kerra (a cat-person similar to the Vah Shir of the original EverQuest), the Ratonga (a rat-like people), the Sarnak (a dragon-like people) and the Fae and Arasai (fairy-like people). The Froglok race was originally locked until a special server-wide quest was completed to make them playable. Some races are restricted to certain starting cities, based on their alignment, but can turn traitor and move to the opposing city. There are four "archetypes" in EverQuest II - Fighter, Scout, Priest and Mage. When EverQuest 2 was launched, a player chose the character's archetype during the initial character creation and then chose a 'class' at level 10 and a 'sub-class' at level 20. This system was changed in 2006 so that a character's final class is chosen at creation.

Acquisition of equipment is a major focus of character progression. EverQuest II has no experience loss or lost levels from dying. Upon death, characters respawn with their gear intact at specific revival locations, with a minor experience debt to be repaid. Gear is fully functional until its condition runs out after 10 consecutive deaths, and is repaired to 100% for a fee. Players can form groups of up to 6 players, or raids of up to 24 players (i.e., four groups). Monster encounters are classified into corresponding categories of difficulty, and tend to drop corresponding tiers of treasure. Player interaction is encouraged by integrated voice chat, a built-in mail system, global chat channels, and a global marketplace. A looking-for-group tool is provided for adventurers, and looking-for-work for crafters. EverQuest II has strong support for guilds. Each guild has an experience bar and earns guild levels (up to 150). The guild gains experience when its members perform tasks that earn city status. Higher guild levels unlock new items, mounts, houses, guild halls, and other privileges for its members. Guilds get a hosted website and forum, as well as a guild bank with officer controls. Guild recruitment tools are integrated into the game. Players can also maintain houses. A secure commission system allows players to sell their crafting skills to other players, or use the common market system to sell finished items.

== History ==
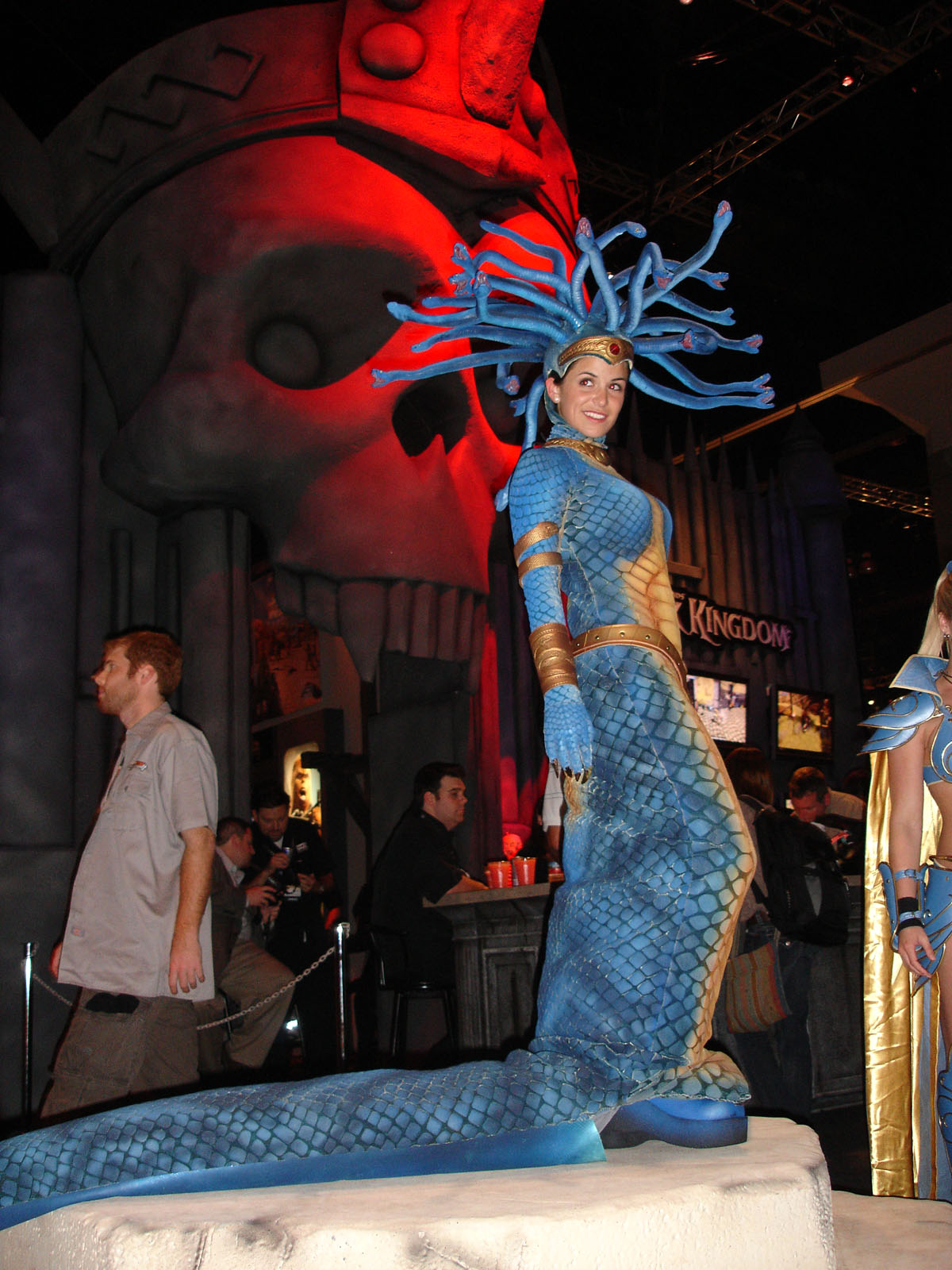
Promotion at E3 2006

SOE markets EverQuest II not as a direct sequel, but as a "parallel universe" to the original EverQuest. It is set in an alternate future of the original game's setting, having diverged at the conclusion of the Planes of Power expansion (the lore is explained in an in-game book). This allows both development teams to pursue whatever direction they want to take without impacting the other, and allows players of the original EverQuest to continue receiving updates without forcing players down a specific path. In that sense, they are two completely separate games bound together by name only. Players of the original EverQuest will find many familiar places and characters, as well as "heritage items" that are similar in name and function to items known from EverQuest and can be gained via heritage quests.

In Europe, the game was published by Ubisoft, followed by Koch Media. As of 2010 it lacks any European publisher and is distributed in Europe only as a digital download.

In February 2005, EverQuest II ran a promotion with Pizza Hut to allow players to order pizza from within the game. Players could type "/pizza" into the chat bar, which would open the online ordering section of the Pizza Hut website. This promotion has since ended, but generated significant press for the game.

In June 2005, SOE introduced Station Exchange to EverQuest II. Station Exchange is an official auction system - only on designated servers - allowing real money to be transferred for in-game money, items or characters.

In March 2006, SOE ended its Chinese/Korean operations for EverQuest II, which were supported in the region by Gamania. The beta period for the game in China/Korea ended on 29 March, and on 30 March, all Chinese/Korean accounts were moved to the US servers of the game.

EQuinox, an official magazine of EverQuest II published by SOE, was released on August 9, 2007.

In December 2008, SOE introduced Station Cash, a real-money trading (RMT) feature.

In January 2009, SOE together with Valve made EverQuest II available on Steam.

In July 2010, SOE released a separate version of EverQuest II called EverQuest II Extended, a free to play version of the game funded by micro-transactions or optional subscription play. The free to play version was run on a separate server from the subscription servers.

By November 2011, EverQuest II was going free to play following a similar path as EverQuest II Extended. As of the following month, with the release of GU62 and Age of Discovery, EverQuest II was updated from being a subscription based game to a free to play title with optional subscription.

Later, in February 2015, SOE's parent corporation, Sony Computer Entertainment, sold the studio to investment company Columbus Nova and it was rebranded as Daybreak Game Company, which continues to develop and publish EverQuest.

At the end of October 2012, Krono was added as an experiment. Krono works like the Plex currency in EVE Online: it allows players to buy an in-game item for real money that adds 30 days of Gold subscription to the account. Krono can also be traded between players, sold via the Broker or gifted to another player's account. Krono is also a much safer way of purchasing game time than purchasing SC cards from players in the game, which may or may not sell a valid code for the players.

=== Audio ===
A small number of NPCs use actual voices. The actors used for these parts included Hollywood stars such as Heather Graham (as Queen Antonia Bayle), Christopher Lee (as Overlord Lucan D'Lere) and Minnie Driver (as 'Dancer'). Wil Wheaton, Dwight Schultz, Richard Horvitz, Alan Dale and Danica McKellar are also part of the cast. According to SOE, in October 2004, EverQuest II featured 130 hours of spoken dialog recorded by 266 voice actors. More dialog has been added since release as part of regular game updates. In September 2005, EverQuest II: Desert of Flames added player voice emotes. It also features voice actors Peter Renaday, Colleen O'Shaughnessey, and Nick Jameson.

The music for the game, over ninety minutes' worth, was composed by Emmy-award-winning composer Laura Karpman and recorded by the FILMharmonic Orchestra Prague under her direction. Karpman said that every place has a theme, its own separate, unique feeling - from a quasi-African savanna to a Babylonian city. Their goal was to bring a cinematic feel in the music. Purchasers of the EverQuest II Collector's Edition received a soundtrack CD as part of the package. The expansions, Echoes of Faydwer and Rise of Kunark, included many themes from the corresponding zones in the original EverQuest, arranged by Inon Zur. With the Rise of Kunark expansion came a major update to the combat music. A new system was added with 14 contextual combat themes. The strength of the enemy or enemies and tide of the battle determine the tone of the combat music. The previous combat music consisted of just a few linear pieces.

=== Expansions ===
| # | Title | Type | Release date |
|---|---|---|---|
| - | The Bloodline Chronicles | Adventure Pack | March 21, 2005 |
| - | The Splitpaw Saga | Adventure Pack | June 28, 2005 |
| 1 | Desert of Flames | Expansion | September 13, 2005 |
| 2 | Kingdom of Sky | Expansion | February 21, 2006 |
| - | The Fallen Dynasty | Adventure Pack | June 14, 2006 |
| 3 | Echoes of Faydwer | Expansion | November 14, 2006 |
| 4 | Rise of Kunark | Expansion | November 13, 2007 |
| 5 | The Shadow Odyssey | Expansion | November 18, 2008 |
| 6 | Sentinel's Fate | Expansion | February 16, 2010 |
| 7 | Destiny of Velious | Expansion | February 21, 2011 |
| 8 | Age of Discovery | Feature Expansion | December 6, 2011 |
| 9 | Chains of Eternity | Expansion | November 13, 2012 |
| 10 | Tears of Veeshan | Expansion | November 12, 2013 |
| 11 | Altar of Malice | Expansion | November 11, 2014 |
| - | Rum Cellar | Adventure Pack | April 28, 2015 |
| 12 | Terrors of Thalumbra | Expansion | November 17, 2015 |
| 13 | Kunark Ascending | Expansion | November 15, 2016 |
| 14 | Planes of Prophecy | Expansion | November 28, 2017 |
| 15 | Chaos Descending | Expansion | November 13, 2018 |
| 16 | Blood of Luclin | Expansion | December 17, 2019 |
| 17 | Reign of Shadows | Expansion | December 15, 2020 |
| 18 | Visions of Vetrovia | Expansion | December 1, 2021 |
| 19 | Renewal of Ro | Expansion | November 30, 2022 |
| 20 | Ballads of Zimara | Expansion | November 29, 2023 |
| 21 | Scars of Destruction | Expansion | November 20, 2024 |
| 22 | Rage of Cthurath | Expansion | December 10, 2025 |
| 23 | Descent to Val'Zyroth | Expansion | TBA 2026 |

With EverQuest II, Sony Online Entertainment introduced the concept of Adventure Packs (an innovation created by Sean Kauppinen, who was the head of international Product PR at the time). Adventure Packs are meant to be smaller "mini-expansions" to the game, adding a plot line with several zones, new creatures and items to the game via digital download. These smaller Adventure Packs come with a smaller fee ranging from US$4.99 to US$7.99, but recently the development team has decided to release free zones and content instead of making adventure packs. Some recent releases include a new starting city, Neriak, with a new starting race, Arasai; and new high level dungeons, The Throne of New Tunaria and the Estate of Unrest.

Similar to other games, expansions can be bought in stores or downloaded through a digital service. The retail versions often come packaged with a bonus feature such as a creature that the player can put in their in-game house. Expansions generally introduce many new zones with new plot lines, features, creatures, items, cities and often come with a boost in the level cap or a new player race. Currently, all players have been given the expansions preceding Destiny of Velious as part of the base game. Access to levels above 92 and their respective zones require the purchase of the Tears of Veeshan expansion, which includes the previous Chains of Eternity expansion. Free to Play accounts have access to the same areas as subscription accounts, but have certain restrictions in place. Many of the free to play restrictions have been removed, including bag slot restrictions, coin restrictions, quest journal limits, race and class restrictions, and gear restrictions, but other restrictions such as the inability to buy or sell items on the broker as a free player, having spell tier restrictions, and being unable to move the alternate advancement slider remain.

- EverQuest II: East was created for the East Asian market (mainland China, Taiwan, South Korea) but it was terminated as a separate edition on 29 March 2006. EverQuest II: East players were moved to standard servers. The special character models created for the game had already been included in the standard edition as a client-side option since 2005.
- EverQuest II Extended - in early 2010, Sony Online Entertainment consulted the EverQuest II player population to determine the extent of support for adding a free-to-play model to EverQuest II. The resulting product, EverQuest II Extended, was unveiled in the summer at FanFaire 2010. A significant game update coincided with the beta release of EverQuest II Extended, which revamped the game's user interface and newbie experience and revised many of the previous rules related to character creation. In December 2011, free-to-play access was added to the existing EverQuest II Extended servers and the former EverQuest II Extended Freeport server was added among them.

=== Scholarly research ===
EverQuest II has been used by academics to study a variety of phenomena; for example, that virtual economic behavior in EverQuest II follows real-world patterns in terms of production, consumption and money supply; and observations that less than one percent (0.43%) of all the players are Platinum Farmers and more than three quarters (77.66%) of all Platinum Farmers are Chinese.

== Reception ==
Reception

Aggregate score
| Aggregator | Score |
|---|---|
| Metacritic | 83/100 |

Review scores
| Publication | Score |
|---|---|
| Computer and Video Games | 9 / 10 |
| Game Informer | 8.5 / 10 |
| GamePro | 4 / 5 |
| GameSpot | 7.8 / 10 |
| GameSpy | 4/5 |
| IGN | 8.5 / 10 |
| PC Gamer (US) | 78% |
| Play | 7.5 / 10 |

EverQuest II had mostly positive reception from critics, earning an 83 out of 100 average score from aggregate review website Metacritic. Many reviewers compared the title to the original EverQuest, which was viewed as one of the best and most influential examples of the genre. Greg Kasavin of GameSpot said that EverQuest II isn't the massive step for the genre that its predecessor was, but it can still be a fun and addictive online role-playing experience that provides to offer for new and experienced players. Mario Lopez of GameSpy commented that it was "much more inviting, convenient, and forgiving" relative to the first game, but that it was less groundbreaking. The reviewer would find that the breadth of voice acting, however, was its biggest advancement. Lopez would ultimately declare that EverQuest II was "extremely fun to play, frequently rewarding, and designed with just the right amount of user convenience in mind".

The game's presentation and photorealistic graphics were often praised, with Computer and Video Games declaring that "there are off-line games equally or even more spectacular in immediate scenery or character models, but what game can offer such outrageous landscapes on such a grandiose scale?" Computer Games Magazine similarly felt that the game's setting was a "brilliantly" reworked world with that technology. According to GameSpot, however, the high system requirements of the title meant that performance issues were common, and that a player would need a "monster system" in order to experience the game in its highest quality. Kasavin additionally commented that the developers of this engine were presumably thinking ahead towards to the future when they built EverQuest II's technology, but that game's visuals were not so impressive to justify the extreme system requirements. Steve Butts of IGN also found that attempting to play the game on higher graphic settings resulted in "terrible performance", but that a consistent frame rate with high graphic quality was possible with an appropriate gaming computer. While the editor was "not as huge a fan" of the title's visual style, he commended its high level of detail.

EverQuest II was nominated for "Best Massively Multiplayer Online Game" in GameSpot's Best and Worst of 2004 awards, and was runner-up for "Best Persistent World Game" in IGN's Best of 2004 awards, losing both to World of Warcraft. Computer Games Magazine named it the seventh-best computer game of 2004, with its editors declaring it an improvement "upon not only its own predecessor, but just about every predecessor out there". GameSpy granted EverQuest II the title of "Most Improved Game" during its 2006 annual PC awards due to the addition of PvP servers and the release of the Echoes of Faydwer expansion that same year. After adopting a free-to-play model in 2011, the title was named "Best Bang for the Buck" in Massively's annual awards that same year.

=== Sales and subscriptions ===
EverQuest II reached 100,000 active accounts within 24 hours of release, which grew to over 300,000 two months later in January 2005. As of 2012, the game had an estimated subscriber peak of 325,000 achieved sometime in 2005. As of September 2020, EverQuest II had 21,000 subscribers and 29,000 monthly active players.

== East Asian version ==
EverQuest II: East
- Developer: Sony Online Entertainment
- Publisher: Gamania
- Platform: Windows
- Release: April 2005
- Genre: MMORPG
- Mode: Multiplayer

EverQuest II: East (Simplified Chinese: "无尽的任务2: 东方版"; Traditional Chinese: "無盡的任務2: 東方版"; Korean: "에버퀘스트2: 이스트") was an alternate edition of EverQuest II, developed for the China, Taiwan and South Korea markets. Sony Online Entertainment developed and shipped EverQuest II: East to East Asia in April 2005. There were some proprietary missions for EverQuest II: East. Sony Online Entertainment developed a separate character model for EverQuest II: East called "SOGA Model", which it also imported to the original version on LiveUpdate 16 on November 9, 2005.

EverQuest II: East used settings similar to those from the original version. Gamania and SOE added some entities and quests only for the Eastern Version, unlike SOE's servers. In EverQuest II: East, players could name their character in their local language. In EverQuest II: East, most dialogue continued to use English, except the novice tutorial. Gamania localized the novice tutorials as a special feature of EverQuest II: East.

Because of the bad reputation of localization, EverQuest II: East failed in Asia. Gamania declared its termination on March 29, 2006. All Chinese accounts were transferred to the Mistmoore server, all Taiwanese accounts to the Najena server and all Korean accounts to Unrest.
