= Ashes of Creation =

Cancelled MMORPG

- Developer: Intrepid Studios
- Publisher: Intrepid Studios
- Director: Steven Sharif (creative)
- Composers: Bear McCreary; Inon Zur
- Engine: Unreal Engine 5
- Platform: Windows
- Release: Cancelled
- Genre: MMORPG
- Mode: Multiplayer

Ashes of Creation is a cancelled sandbox massively multiplayer online role-playing game (MMORPG) developed and published by Intrepid Studios. It was announced in 2016 and gained recognition through a Kickstarter campaign, meeting its goal of $750,000 in under 12 hours and eventually raising over $3 million. It features a dynamic system of world building, where players' actions directly contribute to the layout of the game world.

Ashes of Creation was released in early access on Steam on December 11, 2025. On January 31, 2026, creative director and studio co-founder Steven Sharif resigned from Intrepid, followed by a mass layoff. WARN Act notices filed by the company describe a permanent closure of Intrepid Studios. The game was removed from Steam on February 2, 2026.

== Gameplay ==
Players can pick from a range of races and classes. Initially, the player creates their character and picks one of the nine races. These consist of Kaelar or Vaelune Human, Empyrean or Py'rai Elf, Ren'kai or Vek Orc, Dünir or Niküa Dwarf, and the Tulnar. The players will also pick one of the eight primary archetypes which consist of Tank, Cleric, Mage, Fighter, Rogue, Ranger, Bard, and Summoner. Upon reaching level 25, the player can pick a secondary archetype from the initial list creating a combination of 64 possible class combinations.

Ashes of Creation features a player driven world building mechanic. As players play, designated regions will dynamically form, known as nodes. As more individuals play in that region these nodes can eventually turn into towns or cities, allowing for land development, a housing system, and a player driven political system. Dynamic PvE events will occur within the nodes and how players interact with the events will impact their development. For example, if players fail to address goblins in the area, their settlement will continue to grow and have a further impact on the area. NPCs in the node may react to these changes and develop hatred for the mobs as well.

== Setting ==
Ashes of Creation is set in the fictional medieval high-fantasy world of Verra. This world features a diverse range of biomes, both based on the real world, such as snow, jungles, plains, etc. and biomes created by Intrepid such as corrupted areas and the Underrealm.

== Development ==
Intrepid Studios, based in San Diego, California, announced Ashes of Creation on December 10, 2016, in a blogpost on the official website. Game development is primarily funded by Intrepid Studios founder Steven Sharif.

In June 2017, a Kickstarter campaign was launched for Ashes of Creation. According to Intrepid Studios, crowdfunding was decided on to "connect directly with the players most invested in our success". The Kickstarter campaign met its initial funding target of $750,000 in less than 12 hours, eventually raising over $3.25 million from over 19,000 backers by the end of the campaign, making it one of the fastest and highest funded projects on the platform. The Kickstarter campaign drew criticism due to its use of a referral program that rewarded players with premium game credits or cash when referring others to donate to the Kickstarter campaign. Despite it being against Kickstarter rules, the referral program continued and no action was taken against the campaign. By July 2018, 500,000 users had registered accounts on the official website and 40,000 had purchased access to the alpha and beta versions.

In August 2018, Intrepid Studios came to an agreement with publisher My.com for the rights to publish the game in EU and CIS regions. When players voiced concerns regarding creative control, My.com's Voker Boenigk published a statement that Intrepid would retain full control over the direction of the game. In August 2020, My.com and Intrepid parted ways, and the studio would instead self-publish in those regions.

Sharif said in 2020 that the game was planned to operate on a $15 a month subscription model with no upfront cost. On May 27, 2021, it was announced that lead game designer Jeffrey Bard would be leaving the project, and on September 17, 2021, Wynne McLaughlin, lead writer for games such as Elder Scrolls Online, had been hired by Intrepid as a senior narrative designer. Intrepid Studio announced in December 2021 that it would be switching the game engine from Unreal Engine 4 to Unreal Engine 5 to allow for faster development and to take advantage of additional tools available in the newer engine.

A lawsuit filed by cloud service provider SADA systems against Intrepid Studios in late 2025 demanded $850,000 for over three years of unpaid fees. In a comment on Reddit, Sharif described the lawsuit as a "contract dispute", stating that the amount owed was "a week's worth in [operating expenses] for the studio".

Originally scheduled to start in June, Ashes of Creation began its first closed alpha playtest period on July 14, 2021. The alpha was available for players who purchased a $500 pre-order package and was subject to a non-disclosure agreement. The first alpha period was open until August 15, 2021. A second alpha period was set for Q3 of 2024. Starting on December 11, 2025, Ashes of Creation became available on Steam as an early access release in Alpha II testing.

=== Ashes of Creation: Apocalypse ===
In December 2018, a free battle royale game, Ashes of Creation: Apocalypse, was released by Intrepid Studios. The game was released as "a testing ground for new systems and content" according to the studio, and to showcase the work that has been completed since the Kickstarter campaign ended. While the game was free, it included options to purchase cosmetic items and any cosmetic items that were earned in Apocalypse would transfer to the main game once it released. In September 2019, the game was released for free on Steam. Ashes of Creation: Apocalypse was taken offline on March 10, 2020.

== Studio closure ==
In a Reddit post on January 22, 2026, creative director and studio co-founder Steven Sharif addressed rumors of a layoff at Intrepid Studios, stating that nine out of 250 employees at Intrepid were impacted by "targeted team adjustments" and assuring that the layoff was "not a reflection of the health or future of Ashes of Creation". A notice was posted to the studio's website on January 29, which promised to address several issues and delayed an upcoming development update stream on Twitch to February 13.

On January 31, 2026, Steven Sharif announced his resignation from Intrepid Studios in a message posted on Discord, citing an internal feud between creative leaders and the studio's board of directors. Sharif stated that he resigned "in protest" of actions directed by the studio's board which he "could not ethically agree with or carry out". Sharif said that members of the senior leadership team also resigned following his departure, after which the board issued WARN Act notices to the staff and issued a mass layoff. The WARN notice filed in California described the situation at Intrepid as a permanent closure, with 123 employees losing their jobs as a result of the shutdown.

The day after Sharif's Discord message, several Intrepid employees posted on LinkedIn that they were no longer with the company, with some describing the mass layoff as the result of a complete closure of the game studio. Former director of communications Margaret Krohn later said that Intrepid Studios had shut down, that a WARN notice was sent to "the entire studio", and that employees would not be receiving their final paychecks among other owed compensation. Several former employees filed lawsuits against Intrepid Studios seeking to recover the owed compensation and accusing the company of violating the WARN Act by not giving the required 60 days of notice.

Investor Jason Caramanis accused Sharif of years of financial fraud, saying that he lost $12.5 million on Ashes of Creation and that Sharif had not invested his own funds into game development. Providing accounting books from another investor’s forensic accountant, Caramanis claimed that Intrepid had accrued a debt of $140 million after a 2019 deal with Chinese company iDreamSky for $60 million over five years with a 35% revenue share had fallen through. Caramanis said that key investor Robert Dawson, who had invested $80 million, demanded a restructure of the company, including a layoff of 70% of employees, at the beginning of 2026. Caramanis said that Sharif refused, resigned, and took $3.7 million revenue from the game's sales on Steam, which Caramanis called a "deliberate act of sabotage".

Ashes of Creation was removed from sale on Steam on February 2, 2026.
