= EverQuest =

1999 video game

- Developers: Verant Interactive; 989 Studios
- Publishers: NA: Sony Online Entertainment; EU: Ubi Soft
- Producer: Brad McQuaid
- Designers: Steve Clover; Brad McQuaid; William Trost
- Programmer: Steve Clover
- Artist: Rosie Rappaport
- Composer: Jay Barbeau (Note: Additional music by Paul Anthony Romero, Rob King, Laura Karpman, Chad Mossholder, Inon Zur, and Mark MacBride.)
- Engine: True3D
- Platforms: Windows (1999–); Mac OS X (2003–2013)
- Release: Microsoft Windows: NA: March 16, 1999; EU: April 28, 2000; Mac OS X: NA: June 24, 2003
- Genre: Massively multiplayer online role-playing game
- Mode: Multiplayer

EverQuest is a 3D fantasy-themed massively multiplayer online role-playing game (MMORPG) originally developed by Verant Interactive and 989 Studios for Windows. It was released by Sony Online Entertainment in March 1999 in North America, and by Ubisoft in Europe in April 2000. A dedicated version for Mac OS X was released in June 2003, which operated for ten years before being shut down in November 2013. In June 2000, Verant Interactive was absorbed into Sony Online Entertainment, which took over full development and publishing duties of the title. Later, in February 2015, SOE's parent corporation, Sony Computer Entertainment, sold the studio to investment company Columbus Nova and it was rebranded as Daybreak Game Company, which continues to develop and publish EverQuest.

It was the first commercially successful MMORPG to employ a 3D game engine, and its success was on an unprecedented scale. EverQuest has had a wide influence on subsequent releases within the market, and holds an important position in the history of massively multiplayer online games.

The game surpassed early subscription expectations and increased in popularity for many years after its release. It has received numerous awards, including the 1999 GameSpot Game of the Year and a 2007 Technology & Engineering Emmy Award. While dozens of similar games have come and gone over the years, EverQuest still endures as a viable commercial enterprise, with new expansions still being released on a regular basis, more than twenty-five years after its initial launch. It has spawned a number of spin-off media, including books and video games, as well as a sequel, EverQuest II, which launched in 2004.

== Gameplay ==
Many of the elements in EverQuest have been drawn from text-based MUD (Multi-User Dungeon) games, particularly DikuMUDs, which in turn were inspired by traditional role-playing games such as Dungeons & Dragons. In EverQuest, players create a character (also known as an avatar, or colloquially as a char or toon) by selecting one of twelve races in the game, which were humans, high-elves, wood-elves, half-elves, dark-elves, erudites, barbarians, dwarves, halflings, gnomes, ogres, and trolls. In the first expansion, lizard-people (Iksar) were introduced. Cat-people (Vah Shir), frog-people (Froglok), and dragon-people (Drakkin) were all introduced in later expansions. At creation, players select each character's adventuring occupation (such as a wizard, ranger, or cleric), a patron deity, and starting city. Customization of the character facial appearance is available at creation (hair, hair color, face style, facial hair, facial hair color, eye color, etc.).

A Sand Giant engaging a group in the Oasis of Marr, a desert zone. The low-polygon character models and simple user interface suggest this screenshot was taken between 1999 and 2002.

Players move their character throughout the medieval fantasy world of Norrath, often fighting monsters and enemies for treasure and experience points, and optionally mastering trade skills. As they progress, players advance in level, gaining power, prestige, spells, and abilities through valorous deeds such as entering overrun castles and keeps, defeating worthy opponents found within, and looting their remains. Experience and prestigious equipment can also be obtained by completing quests given out by non-player characters found throughout the land.

EverQuest allows players to interact with other people through role-play, joining player guilds, and dueling other players (in restricted situations – EverQuest only allows player versus player (PVP) combat on the PvP-specific server, specified arena zones and through agreed upon dueling).

The game-world of EverQuest consists of over five hundred zones.

Multiple instances of the world exist on various servers. In the past, game server populations were visible during log-in, and showed peaks of more than 3000 players per server. The design of EverQuest, like other massively multiplayer online role-playing games, makes it highly amenable to cooperative play, with each player having a specific role within a given group.

=== Classes ===
EverQuest featured fourteen playable character classes upon release in 1999, with two others - Beastlord and Berserker - added in the Shadows of Luclin (2001) and Gates of Discord (2004) expansions, respectively. Each person falls within one of four general categories based on playstyle and the type of abilities they use, with certain classes being restricted to particular races.

Melee classes are those which fight at close quarters and often use direct physical attacks as opposed to magic. These include the Warrior, a tank-based character which wears heavy armor and is designed to take damage for its group using a taunt ability; the Monk, a character which uses a combination of martial arts and barehanded fighting techniques; the Rogue, a combination of thief and assassin classes which can sneak and hide in the shadows as well as steal from enemies; and the Berserker, a strong fighter who specializes in two-handed weapons such as axes and are able to enter a state of increased fury and power.

Priest classes are primarily healers who learn magic that can heal their allies or themselves. The Priest classes are made up of the Cleric, a heavily specialized support class that wears heavy armor and is adept at healing and strengthening their allies; the Druid, a magic-user who draws power from nature which can restore the vitality and magic power of their teammates; and the Shaman, a tribal warrior who draws upon the spirit realm to heal, empower those around them, and weaken their enemies.

Casters are magic-users and sorcerers that wear light armor but command powerful spells. Those among them include the Wizard, a specialized damage-dealing class which uses the power of fire, ice, and pure magic energy for devastating effect as well as teleportation abilities; the Magician, a summoner who is able to call upon elemental servants which aid them in dealing damage; the Necromancer, a dark caster who uses the power of disease and poison to wither away their opponents while commanding undead allies to aid them; and the Enchanter, an illusionist who can take on many forms, support allies with strengthening spells, and pacify enemies with mesmerizing abilities.

Hybrid classes are those that can perform multiple roles or have abilities of various types. These include the Paladin, a knight who possesses the ability to take damage or heal with magic or laying on of hands; the Shadowknight, a dark warrior who uses a combination of melee attacks and disease/poison abilities to damage foes as well as take damage for the party; the Bard, a minstrel who is able to use magical songs for a number of effects, including damaging enemies, strengthening allies, and improving the movement speed of themselves and others; the Ranger, a protector of nature who learns healing and support magic in addition to being able to damage enemies in close combat or at a distance with bows and arrows. They also have the unique ability to track their quarry, mastering the tyranny of distance out in the wild unknown reaches of Norrath. Finally, the Beastlord is a primal fighter who is constantly joined by their animal wards that help them deal damage, and they can assist their teammates with healing and support skills.

=== Deities ===
There are several deities in EverQuest who each have a certain area of responsibility and play a role in the backstory of the game setting. A wide array of armor and weapons are tied to certain deities, making it only possible for those who worship that specific deity to wear/equip them. Additionally, deities determine, to some extent, where characters may and may not go without being attacked on sight by the deity's minions and devoted followers.

=== Zones ===
The EverQuest universe is divided into more than five hundred zones. These zones represent a wide variety of geographical features, including plains, oceans, cities, deserts, and other planes of existence. One of the most popular zones in the game is the Plane of Knowledge, one of the few zones in which all races and classes can coexist harmoniously without interference. The Plane of Knowledge is also home to portals to many other zones, including portals to other planes and to the outskirts of nearly every starting city.

== History ==
=== Development ===
EverQuest began as a concept by John Smedley in 1996. The original design is credited to Brad McQuaid, Steve Clover, and Bill Trost. It was developed by Sony's 989 Studios and its early-1999 spin-off Verant Interactive, and published by Sony Online Entertainment (SOE). Since its acquisition of Verant in late 1999, EverQuest was developed by Sony Online Entertainment. EverQuest had a budget of $15 million.

The design and concept of EverQuest is heavily indebted to text-based MUDs, in particular DikuMUD, and as such EverQuest is considered a 3D evolution of the text MUD genre like some of the MMOs that preceded it, such as Meridian 59 and The Realm Online. John Smedley, Brad McQuaid, Steve Clover and Bill Trost, who jointly are credited with creating the world of EverQuest, have repeatedly pointed to their shared experiences playing MUDs such as Sojourn and TorilMUD as the inspiration for the game. Famed book cover illustrator Keith Parkinson created the box covers for earlier installments of EverQuest.

Development of EverQuest began in 1996 when Sony Interactive Studios America (SISA) executive John Smedley secured funding for a 3D game like text-based MUDs following the successful launch of Meridian 59 the previous year. To implement the design, Smedley hired programmers Brad McQuaid and Steve Clover, who had come to Smedley's attention through their work on the single player RPG Warwizard. McQuaid soon rose through the ranks to become executive producer for the EverQuest franchise and emerged during development of EverQuest as a popular figure among the fan community through his in-game avatar, Aradune. Other key members of the development team included Bill Trost, who created the history, lore and major characters of Norrath (including EverQuest protagonist Firiona Vie), Geoffrey "GZ" Zatkin, who implemented the spell system, and artist Milo D. Cooper, who did the original character modeling in the game.

The start of beta testing was announced by Brad McQuaid in November 1997.

=== Release ===
EverQuest launched with modest expectations from Sony on 16 March 1999 under its Verant Interactive brand and quickly became successful. By the end of the year, it had surpassed competitor Ultima Online in number of subscriptions. Numbers continued rising rapidly until mid-2001 when growth slowed. The game initially launched with volunteer "Guides" who would act as basic customer service/support via 'petitions'. Issues could be forwarded to the Game Master assigned to the server or resolved by the volunteer. Other guides would serve in administrative functions within the program or assisting the Quest Troupe with dynamic and persistent live events throughout the individual servers. Volunteers were compensated with free subscription and expansions to the game. In 2003 the program changed for the volunteer guides taking them away from the customer service focus and placing them into their current roles as roving 'persistent characters' role-playing with the players.

In anticipation of PlayStation's launch, Sony Interactive Studios America made the decision to focus primarily on console titles under the banner 989 Studios, while spinning off its sole computer title, EverQuest, which was ready to launch, to a new computer game division named Redeye (renamed Verant Interactive). Executives initially had low expectations for EverQuest, but in 2000, following the surprising continued success and unparalleled profits of EverQuest, Sony reorganized Verant Interactive into Sony Online Entertainment (SOE) with Smedley retaining control of the company. Many of the original EverQuest team, including Brad McQuaid and Steve Clover left SOE by 2002.

=== Growth and sequels ===
The first four expansions were released in traditional physical boxes at roughly one-year intervals. These were highly ambitious and offered huge new landmasses, new playable races and new classes. The expansion Shadows of Luclin (2001) gave a significant facelift to player character models, bringing the dated 1999 graphics up to modern standards. However, non-player characters which do not correspond to any playable race-gender-class combination (such as vendors) were not updated, leading to the coexistence of 1999-era and 2001-era graphics in many locations. The expansion Planes of Power (2002) introduced The Plane of Knowledge, a hub zone from which players could quickly teleport to many other destinations. This made the pre-existing roads and ships largely redundant, and long-distance overland travel is now virtually unheard of.

EverQuest made a push to enter the European market in 2002 with the New Dawn promotional campaign, which not only established local servers in Germany, France and Great Britain but also offered localized versions of the game in German and French to accommodate players who prefer those languages to English. In the following year the game also moved beyond the PC market with a Mac OS X version.

In 2003 experiments began with digital distribution of expansions, starting with the Legacy of Ykesha. From this point on expansions would be less ambitious in scope than the original four, but the production rate increased to two expansions a year instead of one.

In the same year the franchise also ventured into the console market with EverQuest Online Adventures, released for Sony's internet-capable PlayStation 2. It was the second MMORPG for this console, after Final Fantasy XI. Story-wise it was a prequel, with the events taking place 500 years before the original EverQuest. Other spin-off projects were the PC strategy game Lords of EverQuest (2003) and the co-op Champions of Norrath (2004) for the PlayStation 2.

After these side projects, the first proper sequel was released in late 2004, titled simply EverQuest II. The game is set 500 years after the original. EverQuest II faced severe competition from Blizzard's World of Warcraft, which was released at virtually the same time and quickly grew to dominate the MMORPG genre.

=== Decline ===
Since the release of World of Warcraft and other modern MMORPGs, there have been a number of signs that the EverQuest population is shrinking. The national New Dawn servers were discontinued in 2005 and merged into a general (English-language) European server.

The 2006 expansion The Serpent's Spine introduced the "adventure-friendly" city of Crescent Reach in which all races and classes are able (and encouraged) to start. Crescent Reach is supposed to provide a more pedagogic starting environment than the original 1999 cities, where players were given almost no guidance on what to do. The common starting city also concentrates the dwindling number of new players in a single location, making grouping easier. 2008's Seeds of Destruction expansion introduced computer controlled companions called "mercenaries" that can join groups in place of human players, a response to the increasing difficulty of finding other players of appropriate level for group activities. As of Seeds the production rate also returned to one expansion a year instead of two.

In March 2012, EverQuest departed from the traditional monthly subscription business model by introducing three tiers of commitment: a completely free-to-play Bronze Level, a one-time fee Silver Level, and a subscription Gold Level. The same month saw the closure of EverQuest Online Adventures. Just a few months earlier EverQuest II had gone free-to-play and SOE flagship Star Wars Galaxies was also closed.

In June of the same year, SOE removed the ability to buy game subscription time with Station Cash without any warning to players. SOE apologized for this abrupt change in policy and reinstated the option for an additional week, after which it was removed permanently.

The sole Mac OS server Al'Kabor was closed on November 18, 2013.

In February 2015, Sony sold its online entertainment division to private equity group Columbus Nova, with Sony Online Entertainment subsequently renamed Daybreak Game Company (DBG). An initial period of uncertainty followed, with all projects such as expansions and sequels put on hold and staff laid off. The situation stabilized around the game's 16th anniversary celebrations, and a new expansion was released nine months later.

== Expansions ==
There have been thirty-two expansions to the original game since release. Expansions are purchased separately and provide additional content to the game (for example: raising the maximum character level; adding new races, classes, zones, continents, quests, equipment, game features). When the players purchase the latest expansion they receive all previous expansions they may not have previously purchased. Additionally, the game is updated through downloaded patches. The EverQuest expansions are as follows:

#	Title	Release date	Level cap
1	The Ruins of Kunark	April 24, 2000	60
2	The Scars of Velious	December 5, 2000	60
3	The Shadows of Luclin	December 4, 2001	60
4	The Planes of Power	October 29, 2002	65
5	The Legacy of Ykesha	February 25, 2003	65
6	Lost Dungeons of Norrath	September 9, 2003	65
7	Gates of Discord	February 10, 2004	65
8	Omens of War	September 14, 2004	70
9	Dragons of Norrath	February 15, 2005	70
10	Depths of Darkhollow	September 13, 2005	70
11	Prophecy of Ro	February 21, 2006	70
12	The Serpent's Spine	September 19, 2006	75
13	The Buried Sea	February 13, 2007	75
14	Secrets of Faydwer	November 13, 2007	80
15	Seeds of Destruction	October 21, 2008	85
16	Underfoot	December 15, 2009	85
17	House of Thule	October 12, 2010	90
18	Veil of Alaris	November 15, 2011	95
19	Rain of Fear	November 28, 2012	100
20	Call of the Forsaken	October 8, 2013	100
21	The Darkened Sea	October 28, 2014	105
22	The Broken Mirror	November 18, 2015	105
23	Empires of Kunark	November 16, 2016	105
24	Ring of Scale	December 12, 2017	110
25	The Burning Lands	December 11, 2018	110
26	Torment of Velious	December 18, 2019	115
27	Claws of Veeshan	December 8, 2020	115
28	Terror of Luclin	December 7, 2021	120
29	Night of Shadows	December 6, 2022	120
30	Laurion's Song	December 6, 2023	125
31	The Outer Brood	December 3, 2024	125
32	Shattering of Ro	December 2, 2025	130
33	Favors of Fortune	December 2026	130

== Servers ==
The game runs on multiple game servers, each with a unique name for identification. These names were originally the deities of the world of Norrath. In technical terms, each game server is actually a cluster of server machines. Once a character is created, it can be played only on that server unless the character is transferred to a new server by the customer service staff, generally for a fee. Each server often has a unique community and people often include the server name when identifying their character outside of the game.

There is an official EverQuest server list, as well as unofficial 3rd-party servers. For example, the Project 1999 EverQuest servers are intended to recreate EverQuest in the state it existed in the year it launched and the two subsequent expansions, referred to as the "Classic Trilogy".

=== OS X ===
SOE devoted one server (Al'Kabor) to an OS X version of the game, which opened for beta testing in early 2003, and officially released on June 24 of the same year. The game was never developed beyond the Planes of Power expansion, and contained multiple features and bugs not seen on PC servers, as a side-effect of the codebase having been split from an early Planes of Power date but not updated with the PC codebase. In January 2012, SOE announced plans to shut down the server, but based on the passionate response of the player base, rescinded the decision and changed Al'Kabor to a free-to-play subscription model. At about the same time, SOE revised the Macintosh client software to run natively on Intel processors. Players running on older, PowerPC-based systems lost access to the game at that point. SOE closed Al'Kabor server in November 2013.

=== European ===
Two SOE servers were set up to better support players in and around Europe: Antonius Bayle and Kane Bayle. Kane Bayle was merged into Antonius Bayle.

With the advent of the New Dawn promotion, three additional servers were set up and maintained by Ubisoft: Venril Sathir (British), Sebilis (French) and Kael Drakkal (German). The downside of the servers was that while it was possible to transfer to them, it was impossible to transfer off.

The servers were subsequently acquired by SOE and all three were merged into Antonius Bayle server.

== Reception ==
Reception

Aggregate score
Aggregator	Score
Metacritic	85/100

Review scores
Publication	Score
AllGame	5/5
Computer Games Magazine	4.5/5
Edge	8/10
GamePro	5 / 5
GameRevolution	A−
GameSpot	8.4 / 10
IGN	8.4 / 10
Next Generation	5/5
PC Gamer (US)	86%

Reviews of Everquest were mostly positive upon release in 1999, earning an 85 out of 100 score from aggregate review website Metacritic. Comparing it to other online role-playing titles at the time, critics called it "the best game in its class", and the "most immersive and most addictive online RPG to date". Dan Amrich of GamePro magazine declared that "the bar for online gaming has not so much been raised as obliterated" and that the game's developers had "created the first true online killer app". The reviewer would find fault with its repetitive gameplay in the early levels and lack of sufficient documentation to help new players, urging them to turn to fansites for help instead. Greg Kasavin of GameSpot similarly felt that the game's combat was "uninteresting" but did note that, unlike earlier games in the genre, EverQuest offered the opportunity to play on servers that wouldn't allow players to fight each other unless they chose to, and that it heavily promoted cooperation. Despite saying that the combat was little "boring", that the manual was "horrible", that the quest system is "half-baked", and the game having small share of miscellaneous bugs, he ultimately called EverQuest as one of the most memorable gaming experiences he had. Baldric of Game Revolution likewise stated that the game was more co-operative than Ultima Online, but that there was less interaction with the environment, calling it more "player oriented" instead of "'world' oriented". A review in Edge said that EverQuest was the best online role-playing yet while noting that the game would be very unforgiving for new players at the start.

Despite server issues during the initial launch, reviewers felt that the game played well even on lower-end network cards, with Tal Blevins of IGN remarking that it rarely suffered from major lag issues. The reviewer did feel that the title suffered from a lack of player customization aside from different face types, meaning all characters of the same race looked mostly the same, but its visual quality on the whole was "excellent" with "particularly impressive" spell, lighting, and particle effects. Next Generation said that EverQuest set a high standards for its genre. Computer Games Magazine commended the game's three-dimensional graphics, first-person perspective, environments, and simple combat system, remarking that EverQuest gave the players the first step towards to the true virtual world.

=== Accolades ===
Everquest was named GameSpot's 1999 Game of the Year in its Best & Worst of 1999 awards, remarking that after the game's release in March, the whole gaming industry was grounded to a halt, that a least one prominent game developer blamed EverQuest for product delays, and that for several weeks GameSpot's editors were spending more time exploring Norrath than they were doing their jobs. The website would also include the game in their list of the Greatest Games of All Time in 2004. GameSpot UK would also rank the title 14th on its list of the 100 Best Computer Games of the Millennium in 2000, calling it "a technological tour de force" and the first online RPG to bring the production values of single-player games to the online masses. The Academy of Interactive Arts and Sciences named EverQuest their "Online Game of the Year" during the 3rd Annual Interactive Achievement Awards, while Game Revolution named it the Best PC RPG of 1999. It was included in Time magazine's Best of 1999 in the "Tech" category, and Entertainment Weekly would include the game in their Top Ten Hall of Fame Video Games of the '90s. In 2007, Sony Online Entertainment received a Technology & Engineering Emmy Award for EverQuest under the category of "Development of Massively Multiplayer Online Graphical Role Playing Games". During the 2nd annual Game Developers Choice Online Awards in 2011, EverQuest received a Hall of Fame award for its long-term advancement of online gaming, such as being the first MMORPG to feature a guild system and raiding.

Editors of Computer Gaming World and GameSpot each nominated EverQuest for their 1999 "Role-Playing Game of the Year" awards, both of which ultimately went to Planescape: Torment. CNET Gamecenter likewise nominated it in this category, but gave the award to Asheron's Call. GameSpot would also nominate the title for Best Multiplayer Game of 1999, but would give the award to Quake III Arena. In 2012, 1UP.com ranked EverQuest 57th on its list of the Top 100 Essential Games. Game Informer placed the game 33rd on their top 100 video games of all time in 2009.

=== Sales and subscriptions ===
EverQuest was the most pre-ordered PC title on EBGames.com prior to its release in March 1999. The game had 10,000 active subscribers 24 hours after launch, making it the high-selling online role-playing game up until that point. It achieved 60,000 subscribers by April 1999. Six months later, around 225,000 copies of the game had been sold in total, with 150,000 active subscribers. By early 2000, the game's domestic sales alone reached 231,093 copies, which drew revenues of $10.6 million. It had sold 352,000 copies and had 259,000 subscribers by September 2000. NPD Techworld, a firm that tracked sales the United States, reported 559,948 units sold of EverQuest by December 2002. Subscription numbers would rise to over 500,000 active accounts four years after release in 2003. By the end of 2004 the title's lifetime sales exceeded 3 million copies worldwide and reached an active subscriber peak of 550,000. As of September 2020, EverQuest had 66,000 subscribers and 82,000 monthly active players.

== Controversies ==
=== Sale of in-game objects/real world economics ===
The sale of in-game objects for real currency is a controversial and lucrative industry with topics concerning practices of hacking/stealing accounts for profit. Critics often cite how it affects the virtual economy inside the game. In 2001, the sales of in-game items for real life currency was banned on eBay.

A practice in the real-world trade economy is of companies creating characters, powerleveling them to make them powerful, and then reselling the characters for large sums of money or in-game items of other games.

Sony discourages the payment of real-world money for online goods, except on certain "Station Exchange" servers in EverQuest II, launched in July 2005. The program facilitates buying in-game items for real money from fellow players for a nominal fee. At this point this system only applies to select EverQuest II servers; none of the pre-Station Exchange EverQuest II or EverQuest servers are affected.

In 2012, Sony added an in-game item called a "Krono", which adds 30 days of game membership throughout EverQuest and EverQuest II. The item can be initially bought starting at US$17.99. Up to 25 "Kronos" can be bought for US$424.99. Krono can be resold via player trading, which has allowed Krono to be frequently used in the real-world trade economy due to its inherent value.

=== Intellectual property and roleplaying ===
==== Mystere incident ====
In October 2000, Verant banned a player by the name of Mystere, allegedly for creating controversial fan fiction, causing outrage among some EverQuest players and sparking a debate about players' rights and the line between roleplaying and intellectual property infringement. The case was used by several academics in discussing such rights in the digital age.

=== Addiction ===
Some argue the game has addictive qualities. Some players jokingly refer to it as "EverCrack" (a comparison to crack cocaine). There was one well-publicized suicide of an EverQuest user named Shawn Woolley, that inspired his mother, Liz, to found Online Gamers Anonymous. In November 2001, Shawn Woolley committed suicide. Although he had been diagnosed with depression and schizoid personality disorder, Shawn's mother said the suicide was due to a rejection or betrayal in the game from a character Shawn called "iluvyou".

=== Sociological aspects of MMORPGs ===
Massively multiplayer online role-playing games (MMORPGs) are described by some players as "chat rooms with a graphical interface". The sociological aspects of EverQuest (and other MMORPGs) are explored in a series of online studies on a site known as "the HUB". The studies make use of data gathered from player surveys and discuss topics like virtual relationships, player personalities, gender issues, and more.

=== Organized protests ===
In May 2004, Woody Hearn of GU Comics called for all EverQuest gamers to boycott the Omens of War expansion in an effort to force SOE to address existing issues with the game rather than release another "quick-fire" expansion. The call to boycott was rescinded after SOE held a summit to address player concerns, improve (internal and external) communication, and correct specific issues within the game.

=== Prohibition in the state of Minas Gerais, Brazil ===
On 17 January 2008, the Judge of the 17th Federal Court of Minas Gerais State forbade the sales of the game in that Brazilian territory. The reason was that "the game leads the players to a loss of moral virtue and takes them into 'heavy' psychological conflicts because of the game quests".

== EverQuest franchise ==
Since EverQuest's release, Sony Online Entertainment has added several EverQuest-related games. These include:

- EverQuest Hero's Call (Pocket PC, January 2003)
- EverQuest Online Adventures (PlayStation 2, February 2003)
- EverQuest Online Adventures Frontiers (PlayStation 2, November 2003)
- Lords of EverQuest (PC, December 2003)
- Champions of Norrath (PlayStation 2, February 2004)
- EverQuest Hero's Call 2 (Pocket PC, April 2004)
- EverQuest II (PC, November 2004)
- EverQuest War On Faydwer (Pocket PC, launched sometime in early April 2004 and elements were integrated in 2006 to Echoes of Faydwer (DLC)
- Champions: Return to Arms, sequel to Champions of Norrath (PlayStation 2, February 2005)
- EverQuest Role-Playing Game (a role-playing game produced in collaboration with White Wolf which uses the d20 system).
- Legends of Norrath (a virtual card game which launched sometime in 2007 or early 2008 which also awards EverQuest and EverQuest II players with in-game items).
- EverQuest Next, newest story-based EverQuest game (cancelled)
- EverQuest Next Landmark, only world-building EverQuest game (cancelled)
- EverQuest Legends

A line of novels have been published in the world of EverQuest, including:

- Rogue's Hour, by Scott Ciencin (October 2004)
- Ocean of Tears, by Stewart Wieck (October 2005)
- Truth and Steel, by Thomas M. Reid (September 2006)
- The Blood Red Harp, by Elaine Cunningham (October 2006)

== General and cited references ==
- Malone, Krista-Lee (2007). "Dragon Kill Points: The Economics of Power Gamers". Games and Culture. doi:10.2139/ssrn.1008035. ISSN 1555-4120. SSRN 1008035.
