= EverQuest expansions =

Additional content for the MMORPG EverQuest

Cover art for the first EverQuest expansion pack, The Ruins of Kunark

EverQuest is a massively multiplayer online role-playing game (MMORPG) developed by Verant Interactive and released in 1999. Since its launch, the game has received numerous expansion packs that extend the playable world of Norrath, introduce new storylines, and add gameplay features. These expansions have introduced playable races and character classes, increased level caps, and implemented systems such as alternate advancement, player housing, mercenaries, and instanced dungeons.

Early expansions were distributed primarily through physical retail releases, while later installments transitioned to digital distribution. Although expansions initially appeared at varying intervals, the game eventually adopted a predominantly annual release schedule. New expansions have continued to be developed following the game's transition to a free-to-play model in 2012.

== Expansion packs ==
=== The Ruins of Kunark (2000) ===
EverQuest: The Ruins of Kunark
- Developer: Verant Interactive
- Publisher: Sony Online Entertainment
- Release: April 24, 2000

The Ruins of Kunark is the first expansion to EverQuest, released on April 24, 2000. It introduced the continent of Kunark, a land inhabited by ancient civilizations and powerful creatures, and expanded the game's content for both new and experienced players. Its most significant addition was the Iksar, a playable race of reptilian humanoids originating from Kunark. The Iksar possessed distinctive racial abilities and restrictions, including limited class choices and hostile relations with many of Norrath's existing civilizations. The expansion also raised the maximum character level from 50 to 60 and introduced additional quests, equipment, and high-level encounters. The discovery of Kunark was established through in-game events and fiction published by developer Verant Interactive.

In the United States, The Ruins of Kunark sold 92,172 units between February and early November 2001. Desslock of GameSpot reported that the game and The Scars of Velious "sold well early in the year, but sales evaporated during the course of the summer, especially after the release of Camelot". During the 4th Annual Interactive Achievement Awards, the Academy of Interactive Arts & Sciences awarded The Ruins of Kunark with the "Massive Multiplayer/Persistent World" award, and received nominations for "PC Game of the Year" and "Game of the Year".

=== The Scars of Velious (2001) ===
EverQuest: The Scars of Velious
- Developer: Verant Interactive
- Publisher: Sony Online Entertainment
- Release: December 5, 2000

The Scars of Velious is the second expansion to EverQuest, released on December 5, 2000. It introduced the frozen continent of Velious, whose landscape bears the marks of the dragon goddess Veeshan. providing additional powerful monsters to fight and a number of zones meant to be used by large groups of players. Designed primarily for higher-level characters, the expansion centered on a conflict between three major factions: the Coldain dwarves, the Kromzek giants, and the Claws of Veeshan, an alliance of dragons. Players could establish alliances with these factions, gaining access to distinctive quests, equipment, and rewards while becoming hostile to their rivals.

The expansion also introduced several challenging raid encounters, most notably those associated with the Sleeper's Tomb. Players could awaken Kerafyrm, a powerful dragon known as the Sleeper, through a series of encounters, triggering a persistent change to the game world. Additional content expanded the game's divine planes, including realms associated with Tunare, the goddess of nature, and Bristlebane, the god of mischief.

The Scars of Velious sold 66,496 copies in the United States between February and early November 2001. It received generally favorable reviews, attaining an aggregate score of 85% on GameRankings.

=== The Shadows of Luclin (2001) ===
EverQuest: The Shadows of Luclin
- Developer: Sony Online Entertainment
- Publisher: Sony Online Entertainment
- Release: December 4, 2001

The Shadows of Luclin is the third expansion to EverQuest, released on December 4, 2001. Set on Norrath's moon of Luclin, it introduced the playable Vah Shir race, a feline humanoid species, and the Beastlord class, which combines melee combat with spellcasting and animal companions. The expansion also introduced several civilizations, including the Akheva and Shissar, the latter having fled Norrath following a rebellion by their former Iksar subjects.

Significant technical changes included updated character models, a revised graphics engine, and support for customizable user interfaces. Mounts were introduced, allowing characters to travel more quickly and recover health and mana while mounted. Another major addition was the Alternate Advancement system, which enabled players to earn experience toward specialized abilities and character improvements beyond conventional leveling.

Much of the expansion's content emphasized high-level group and raid encounters, particularly those involving the Shissar and their emperor. Certain encounters required players to obtain specialized equipment, including weapons designed to overcome particular enemies' resistances.

The Shadows of Luclin sold approximately 360,000 copies in North America by August 2006, generating $9.9 million in revenue. It was the country's 46th best-selling computer game during the period from January 2000 to August 2006. The expansion also received generally favorable reviews, holding an aggregate score of 86% on GameRankings.

=== The Planes of Power (2002) ===
EverQuest: The Planes of Power
- Developer: Sony Online Entertainment
- Publisher: Sony Online Entertainment
- Release: October 29, 2002

The Planes of Power is the fourth expansion to EverQuest, released on October 29, 2002. The expansion centers on the divine planes of Norrath, allowing players to explore realms associated with the game's deities and confront their inhabitants. Primarily intended for high-level characters, its progression system required players to complete increasingly difficult encounters to gain access to additional planes, culminating in the Plane of Time. These challenges emphasized coordinated group and raid play, with some encounters accommodating as many as 72 participants.

The expansion increased the maximum character level from 60 to 65 and introduced weapons with additional particle effects. It also established the Plane of Knowledge as a central transportation hub, connecting previously distant regions of Norrath through a network of portals. This provided an alternative to conventional travel and became a significant addition to the game's infrastructure.

The Planes of Power received generally favorable reviews, earning an aggregate score of 83% on GameRankings. It was also nominated for PC Gamer US's 2002 Best Expansion Pack award, which was ultimately presented to the expansions for Tom Clancy's Ghost Recon.

=== The Legacy of Ykesha (2003) ===
EverQuest: The Legacy of Ykesha
- Developer: Sony Online Entertainment
- Publisher: Sony Online Entertainment
- Release: February 25, 2003

The Legacy of Ykesha was released 5 months after the fourth expansion, the shortest gap yet at the time. Promoted by Sony Online as EverQuest's "first download-only extension", it was the first EverQuest content expansion available almost exclusively from Sony Online's direct purchase and download service. Due to overwhelming demand, a limited number of CDs were made available to retailers after the product release date. Ykesha was released in February 2003 and was considered a minor content addition at the time. Over time, Ykesha's "extension" designation was lost, and the product is now referred to as a full-fledged EverQuest expansion.

The Legacy of Ykesha introduced the froglok (the frog-like humanoid race present since the original EverQuest was released) as a playable race. To do this, Sony Online Entertainment introduced a storyline whereby the frogloks invaded the Troll city of Grobb and reclaimed and renamed it Gukta. The trolls were sent fleeing to the city of Neriak. Another part of the storyline introduced the Broken Skull Clan of the trolls, which had a rivalry with the Grobb trolls, and live on the island of Broken Skull Rock just off the south coast of Antonica. This is where the new zones of the expansion are located.

Other enhancements of the expansion included dyeable armor, an increase in the number of bank slots available for characters, a new guild management system, a new armor slot called 'Charms', and a new overhead mapping system which allowed players to customize maps. The zones were intended for mid-level adventurers between levels 36-60 and were generally received as very uninspired and added little to the lore of Norrath, but the guild management, extra bank slots, trading between characters utility and mapping tools are considered vital, and dyeing of armor is popular.

Computer Gaming World's Jeff Green gave the expansion a rating of 2½ out of 5 and was critical that the expansion did not add new ideas, other than the ability to play as froglok.

=== Lost Dungeons of Norrath (2003) ===
EverQuest: Lost Dungeons of Norrath
- Developer: Sony Online Entertainment
- Publisher: Sony Online Entertainment
- Release: NA: September 9, 2003; EU: September 12, 2003

Lost Dungeons of Norrath was the sixth expansion, released on September 9, 2003. It was made available as a digital download that month, but purchasers of the retail box version were rewarded with an in-game item (a magic bag), starting Sony's trend to include in-game items as incentive to purchase retail copies of their expansions.

Lost Dungeons of Norrath introduced broad-based instanced dungeons to Norrath, revolving around tales of the Wayfarers - an NPC adventuring organization. Players complete adventures for the Wayfarers in one of five different dungeon themes. Each dungeon theme has about ten different variations of the zone, and players can also choose the type and difficulty of their adventure. When the adventure is finished successfully, players are awarded Adventure Points which can be spent on items, spells, and 'augments' at the Wayfarer camps.

Augments were introduced in Lost Dungeons of Norrath and allow players to enhance existing items by adding an augment to them. Existing items in the game had generally only a single augment slot, so only one augment could be added. Items purchased at the Wayfarer camps occasionally had up to three slots available to augment. In addition to group adventuring, the Wayfarer camps also offered raid content, in which multiple groups could challenge difficult high-end content.

Lost Dungeons of Norrath holds an 82% rating on GameRankings. During the 7th Annual Interactive Achievement Awards, the Academy of Interactive Arts & Sciences awarded Lost Dungeons of Norrath for "Massively Mutliplayer/Persistent World Game of the Year".

=== Gates of Discord (2004) ===
EverQuest: Gates of Discord
- Developer: Sony Online Entertainment
- Publisher: Sony Online Entertainment
- Release: February 10, 2004

Gates of Discord is the seventh expansion to EverQuest, released on February 10, 2004. Continuing the storyline of Lost Dungeons of Norrath, the expansion follows the Wayfarers Brotherhood as they discover the continent of Taelosia, whose former inhabitants have largely disappeared following the arrival of hostile forces. Players investigate the continent's history while confronting the invading Muramites, with much of the content designed for high-level group and raid play.

The expansion introduced the Berserker class, a melee-focused fighter specializing in two-handed weapons. It also added the Tribute system, allowing players to exchange currency and equipment for points used to activate temporary character enhancements. Leadership Alternate Abilities provided group and raid leaders with additional benefits, including improvements to character statistics and targeting functions. The tradeskill interface was also redesigned to incorporate searchable recipes and simplify crafting.

Gates of Discord was criticized for technical problems and its high difficulty at launch. Sony Online Entertainment president John Smedley subsequently characterized the release as one of the company's most significant mistakes. The expansion received a 76% aggregate score on GameRankings.

=== Omens of War (2004) ===
EverQuest: Omens of War
- Developer: Sony Online Entertainment
- Publisher: Sony Online Entertainment
- Release: September 14, 2004

Omens of War is the eighth expansion to EverQuest, released on September 14, 2004. Continuing the storyline introduced in Gates of Discord, the expansion follows the conflict against the Muramite forces of Mata Muram, culminating in a confrontation with the Overlord himself. It increased the maximum character level from 65 to 70 and introduced a new series of class-specific Epic weapons, commonly known as Epic 2.0. Other additions included a guild tribute system, allowing members to contribute resources toward shared benefits, and a task system designed to provide shorter adventures for individual players. The expansion also introduced a voice macro system, additional character titles, and a ninth spell slot obtainable through alternate advancement abilities.

Omens of War holds an 84% rating on GameRankings.

=== Dragons of Norrath (2005) ===
EverQuest: Dragons of Norrath
- Developer: Sony Online Entertainment
- Publisher: Sony Online Entertainment
- Release: February 15, 2005

The ninth expansion, Dragons of Norrath, was released on February 15, 2005. It includes mostly missions given out by an NPC that are completed by a group of players, in instanced zones. It includes a revamp of the Lavastorm zone where the missions are acquired, and an uninstanced zone called The Broodlands where the instanced zones can be accessed. The content revolves around dragons and related monsters. When completing the missions, players receive crystals that can be exchanged at merchants for items.

This expansion also innovates on previous ones. For example, the instanced zones are also available in uninstanced versions, allowing people to explore them and gain experience by simply killing monsters without going into missions. It also has 4 major raid targets, and some smaller scale raids, including a powerful dragon named Vishimtar.

Dragons of Norrath holds an 81% rating on GameRankings.

=== Depths of Darkhollow (2005) ===
EverQuest: Depths of Darkhallow
- Developer: Sony Online Entertainment
- Publisher: Sony Online Entertainment
- Release: September 13, 2005

Depths of Darkhollow is the tenth expansion to EverQuest, released on September 13, 2005. Set primarily in the subterranean regions beneath Norrath, the expansion explores conflicts involving the inhabitants of Darkhollow and the forces of the vampire lord Mayong Mistmoore. Its principal additions included Monster Missions, which allowed players to assume the roles of powerful creatures in scripted encounters, and Spirit Shrouds, which temporarily transformed characters into lower-level creatures to facilitate adventuring with less experienced players. The expansion also introduced evolving items, a new equipment system in which certain weapons and armor accumulated experience and improved their attributes through continued use. Much of its content was designed for characters above level 45.

Depths of Darkhollow holds a 73% rating on GameRankings.

=== Prophecy of Ro (2006) ===
EverQuest: Prophecy of Ro
- Developer: Sony Online Entertainment
- Publisher: Sony Online Entertainment
- Release: February 21, 2006

Prophecy of Ro is the eleventh expansion to EverQuest, released on February 21, 2006. Its storyline involves conflicts across Norrath and the divine planes, including the influence of Sullon Zek and Druzzil Ro. The expansion also revised existing areas of Freeport and the Desert of Ro, incorporating them into its broader narrative. Among its gameplay additions were player-placed traps, which provided additional tactical options during combat, and Spheres of Influence, which created localized effects affecting nearby characters. Environmental interactions were expanded to allow players to manipulate certain objects within the game world. Further interface improvements included customizable buff filters and increased bank storage capacity, with much of the new content intended for higher-level characters.

PC Gamer's Mark Crump gave the expansion a rating of 65% and said that a "twice-a year-pace of adding zones that are swiftly obsolete isn't helping the game out" and that SOE should have focused on current, lesser-used areas instead of creating tomorrow's forgotten ones.

=== The Serpent's Spine (2006) ===
EverQuest: Serpent's Spine
- Developer: Sony Online Entertainment
- Publisher: Sony Online Entertainment
- Release: September 19, 2006

The Serpent's Spine was released as the twelfth expansion on September 19, 2006. New features include new zones, a new player race known as the "Drakkin", an attainable player level of 75, as well as new spells and alternate advancements.

The expansion was added with the aims of making soloing (playing EverQuest alone rather than as part of a larger group) a more viable option. This was done through the addition of a new town, home of the newly added Drakkin race, which provides various tasks for all levels of game play to gain experience, gear, and money. The advertisements for The Serpent's Spine stated that one could go from level one to level 75 without a group or exploring any of the previously existing locations in the game simply through completion of these newly added tasks.

The Serpent's Spine expansion also added the rest feature, allowing players who have been out of combat for a short period of time to regenerate mana and health at a drastically increased rate. This effect was added to aid those soloing, as well as to solve complaints about down time or time spent meditating to regenerate lost mana. While generally well received by the EverQuest community, there have been complaints about the new rest effect causing class balancing issues. This is because some classes can expend their mana rapidly to cause large amounts of damage only to regenerate it with the new rest effect in the time it takes for their group to kill a single monster, thus increasing the total damage done in a group compared to the previous method of conserving mana to ensure a steady supply. This means that classes that are unable to use this method are relatively weaker.

=== The Buried Sea (2007) ===
EverQuest: The Buried Sea
- Developer: Sony Online Entertainment
- Publisher: Sony Online Entertainment
- Release: February 13, 2007

The Buried Sea, the 13th expansion pack, was released on February 13, 2007. It features over 60 new raids and group missions and allows characters to raid pirate vessels. The content is intended for characters of level 55 and higher.

Players may design and display a guild emblem and upgrade the banner to gain special abilities for guild members, including the ability to plant it on a battlefield where guild members can teleport directly to it. Fellowships allow a common chat channel, the ability to create a campfire that can help in adventures, and a token that will allow quick travel to other fellowship members.

Players may gain access to a new inventory slot that can be fitted with a customizable Energeian power source and armor that can tap into the power source.

=== Secrets of Faydwer (2007) ===
EverQuest: Secrets of Faydwer
- Developer: Sony Online Entertainment
- Publisher: Sony Online Entertainment
- Release: November 13, 2007

Secrets of Faydwer is the fourteenth expansion to EverQuest, released on November 13, 2007. Set on the continent of Faydwer, its story concerns the gnomish necromancer Meldrath the Malignant, whose flying fortress and mechanical armies threaten the surrounding lands. The expansion also features the prismatic dragon Kerafyrm, a recurring figure in the game's mythology. It raised the maximum character level from 75 to 80 and introduced heroic statistics, which allowed certain character attributes to exceed their previous limits and provided additional benefits to combat performance. New spells, alternate advancement abilities, and equipment accompanied the increased level cap. Its release also marked a transition toward an annual expansion schedule, replacing the previous twice-yearly cycle.

=== Seeds of Destruction (2008) ===
EverQuest: Seeds of Destruction
- Developer: Sony Online Entertainment
- Publisher: Sony Online Entertainment
- Release: October 21, 2008

Seeds of Destruction is the fifteenth expansion to EverQuest, released on October 21, 2008. Its narrative centers on the fallen deity Zebuxoruk and an effort to prevent the forces of Discord from destroying Norrath by repairing damage to the Void. The storyline involves travel through different periods of Norrath's history, revisiting earlier conflicts and locations. The expansion introduced mercenaries, computer-controlled companions that players could hire to assist in combat, providing additional support for solo and small-group adventuring. It also increased the maximum character level from 80 to 85 and expanded character progression through new alternate advancement abilities, spells, and equipment intended for higher-level play.

=== Underfoot (2009) ===
EverQuest: Underfoot
- Developer: Sony Online Entertainment
- Publisher: Sony Online Entertainment
- Release: December 15, 2009

Underfoot is the sixteenth expansion to EverQuest, released on December 15, 2009. The expansion takes place within the subterranean realm associated with Brell Serilis, where conflict has erupted among the inhabitants of the god's domain, including rival gnoll and kobold factions. It introduced an achievement system that allowed players to track accomplishments throughout Norrath, alongside an expansion progression interface displaying completed objectives and remaining challenges. Another addition was the Focus Target Window, which enabled players to monitor a designated target independently of their current selection, particularly during group and raid encounters. The expansion was distributed digitally and included access to the fifteen preceding expansions.

=== House of Thule (2010) ===
EverQuest: House of Thule
- Developer: Sony Online Entertainment
- Publisher: Sony Online Entertainment
- Release: October 12, 2010

House of Thule is the seventeenth expansion to EverQuest, released on October 12, 2010. The expansion explores the realm of dreams and nightmares associated with the demigod Thule family, particularly the influence of the god of fear, Cazic-Thule. It increased the maximum character level from 85 to 90 and introduced a player housing system, allowing characters to purchase and decorate homes within residential neighborhoods. Players could display collected items and trophies in their houses, with certain trophies providing additional character benefits. The expansion also expanded character inventory capacity and introduced new alternate advancement abilities, extending progression for higher-level characters.

=== Veil of Alaris (2011) ===
EverQuest: Veil of Alaris
- Developer: Sony Online Entertainment
- Publisher: Sony Online Entertainment
- Release: November 15, 2011

Veil of Alaris is the eighteenth expansion to EverQuest, released on November 15, 2011. Following events involving the Thule family, its storyline introduces Alaris, a previously hidden continent inhabited by several distinct civilizations and divided by longstanding political and religious conflicts. The expansion increased the maximum character level from 90 to 95 and expanded the alternate advancement system. It also introduced guild halls within residential neighborhoods, providing additional facilities for guild members. Interface changes included expanded hotbars, the ability to activate items directly from inventory slots, and improvements to guild management through customizable ranks. These additions accompanied further quests, missions, and raid encounters exploring the history of Alaris.

=== Rain of Fear (2012) ===
EverQuest: Rain of Fear
- Developer: Sony Online Entertainment
- Publisher: Sony Online Entertainment
- Release: November 28, 2012

Rain of Fear is the nineteenth expansion to EverQuest, released on November 28, 2012. Continuing the storyline of House of Thule and Veil of Alaris, the expansion follows the consequences of events involving the gods and the inhabitants of Alaris, with the return of the fallen deity Cazic-Thule's influence over Norrath. It raised the maximum character level from 95 to 100 and introduced several gameplay systems, including an Aggro Meter for monitoring enemy hostility and a Collection System that rewarded players for assembling sets of objects. The Slayer System provided achievements and titles for defeating specified numbers of enemies. Improvements to the Bazaar also allowed players to sell items while offline, while equipment progression was revised to offer greater customization of character attributes.

=== Call of the Forsaken (2013) ===
EverQuest: Call of the Forsaken
- Developer: Sony Online Entertainment
- Publisher: Sony Online Entertainment
- Release: October 8, 2013

Call of the Forsaken is the twentieth expansion to EverQuest, released on October 8, 2013. Its storyline begins with a supernatural disturbance in western Antonica that creates a connection between Norrath and the Ethernere, a realm associated with the passage of souls. The resulting instability threatens the boundaries between different realities and draws players into a conflict involving Lady Lendiniara. The expansion introduced Heroic Adventures, repeatable missions with variable objectives and encounters intended to provide different experiences across multiple playthroughs. Mercenaries also received additional customization through equipment slots and alternate advancement abilities, allowing players to improve the effectiveness of their computer-controlled companions. Other additions included expanded shared bank storage and further character progression options.

=== The Darkened Sea (2014) ===
EverQuest: Darkened Sea
- Developer: Sony Online Entertainment
- Publisher: Sony Online Entertainment
- Release: October 28, 2014

The Darkened Sea is the twenty-first expansion to EverQuest, released on October 28, 2014. Its narrative follows an attempt by Firiona Vie to heal Emperor Katta, which is disrupted when Lanys T'Vyl and a faction of the Combine Empire attempt to abduct him. The ensuing pursuit takes players across the seas of Norrath, involving conflicts with the Combine and other inhabitants of the region. The expansion raised the maximum character level from 100 to 105 and introduced the Mount Key Ring, a storage interface allowing players to manage and summon previously acquired mounts without occupying conventional inventory space. It also continued the Heroic Adventures system introduced in Call of the Forsaken, alongside additional spells and alternate advancement abilities.

=== The Broken Mirror (2015) ===
EverQuest: The Broken Mirror
- Developer: Daybreak Game Company
- Publisher: Daybreak Game Company
- Release: November 18, 2015

The Broken Mirror is the twenty-second expansion to EverQuest, released on November 18, 2015. The story concerns the goddess Anashti Sul, whose existence has become divided between opposing aspects of life and decay. Her attempts to consolidate power threaten the balance between these forces and draw players into conflicts across Norrath and its divine planes. The expansion introduced level-scaling raid instances in the Planes of Hate and Fear, allowing characters of different levels to participate in encounters adapted to their progression. It also debuted the Illusion Key Ring, which provided dedicated storage and access to cosmetic transformations without requiring players to retain the associated items in their regular inventories. Additional content included Heroic Adventures and new alternate advancement abilities.

=== Empires of Kunark (2016) ===
EverQuest: Empires of Kunark
- Developer: Daybreak Game Company
- Publisher: Daybreak Game Company
- Release: November 16, 2016

Empires of Kunark is the twenty-third expansion to EverQuest, released on November 16, 2016. Returning to the continent of Kunark, the expansion follows the awakening of Imperator Tsaph Katta, who seeks to restore the ancient Combine Empire and reassert its authority over Norrath. His ambitions bring the Combine into conflict with established powers on the continent, continuing storylines introduced in earlier expansions. The expansion introduced the Familiar Key Ring, a dedicated interface for storing and accessing familiars, which provide cosmetic appearances and various character bonuses. Its content also included new missions and raid encounters centered on the political and military struggles surrounding the attempted restoration of the Combine Empire.

=== Ring of Scale (2017) ===
EverQuest: Ring of Scale
- Developer: Daybreak Game Company
- Publisher: Daybreak Game Company
- Release: December 12, 2017

Ring of Scale is the twenty-fourth expansion to EverQuest, released on December 12, 2017. Continuing the events of Empires of Kunark, the expansion focuses on the conflict between the restored Combine Empire, the Sarnak, and the Ring of Scale, a powerful alliance of dragons. Its storyline explores the competing ambitions of these factions as they struggle for control of Kunark and its ancient territories. The expansion increased the maximum character level from 105 to 110, providing further progression through new spells, combat abilities, and alternate advancements. Additional quests, missions, and raid encounters developed the ongoing conflict, with much of the content intended for characters approaching the new level cap.

=== The Burning Lands (2018) ===
EverQuest: The Burning Lands
- Developer: Daybreak Game Company
- Publisher: Daybreak Game Company
- Release: December 11, 2018

The Burning Lands is the 25th EverQuest expansion and was released on December 11, 2018. The game includes six new adventure zones based around the otherworldly Planes of Air and Fire, new raids, and a new "luck" statistic that influences the frequency of critical hits, the amount of gold in a player's split after defeating enemies in a group, and the success rate of crafting attempts.

=== Torment of Velious (2019) ===
EverQuest: Torment of Velious
- Developer: Daybreak Game Company
- Publisher: Daybreak Game Company
- Release: December 18, 2019

Torment of Velious is the 26th expansion pack for EverQuest released in December 2019. The expansion's story involves players returning to the frozen continent of Velious first seen in the Scars of Velious expansion released in 2000, and features six new zones, new raid content, a raised level cap from 110 to 115, and a new graphical ice shader.

=== Claws of Veeshan (2020) ===
EverQuest: Claws of Veeshan
- Developer: Daybreak Game Company
- Publisher: Daybreak Game Company
- Release: December 8, 2020

Claws of Veeshan is the twenty-seventh expansion pack to EverQuest, released on October 14, 2020. A continuation of the story from the previous expansion, Torment of Velious, the plot involves the player challenging the dragons and undead creatures who roam the frozen lands of Velious. It features six new zones along with new quests, raids, missions, and alternate advancement abilities for each class, as well as a new Dragon's Hoard offering additional storage space.

=== Terror of Luclin (2021) ===
EverQuest: Terror of Luclin
- Developer: Daybreak Game Company
- Publisher: Daybreak Game Company
- Release: December 7, 2021

Terror of Luclin is the twenty-eighth expansion pack to EverQuest, released on December 7, 2021. The story revolves around the return to the moon of Luclin, the setting of the third expansion, The Shadows of Luclin from 2001. A powerful force known as the Akheva led by High Priestess Aten Ha Ra emerge in an attempt to re-establish their empire across the entirety of Luclin while the vampire lord Mayong Mistmoore also serves as a primary antagonist. Players join with a resistance of Akhevian rebels to oppose Aten's plans for domination. The level cap was increased to 120 along with the addition of seven new zones.

=== Night of Shadows (2022) ===
EverQuest: Night of Shadows
- Developer: Daybreak Game Company
- Publisher: Daybreak Game Company
- Release: December 6, 2022

Night of Shadows is the twenty-ninth expansion for EverQuest, released on December 6, 2022. Set primarily on Luclin, its storyline concerns growing unrest among the Vah Shir and other inhabitants following a series of earthquakes and disturbances involving the Great Spirits. Seven new zones expand the playable world, accompanied by additional quests, missions, raids, collections, spells, and alternate advancement abilities. The expansion also debuted the Tradeskill Depot, a shared storage system capable of holding up to 250 stacks of different crafting materials, accessible to characters belonging to the same account and server.

=== Laurion's Song (2023) ===
EverQuest: Laurion's Song
- Developer: Daybreak Game Company
- Publisher: Daybreak Game Company
- Release: December 5, 2023

Laurion's Song is the thirtieth expansion for EverQuest, released on December 5, 2023. Its narrative unfolds within the Realm of Heroes, a sanctuary connected to the Plane of Tranquility, where adventurers encounter the memories and exploits of legendary figures. The expansion increased the maximum character level from 120 to 125 and added seven zones, together with new missions, raids, spells, and alternate advancement abilities. A major addition was the Alternate Personas system, enabling individual characters to develop multiple classes while sharing inventory, banking, and tradeskill progress, rather than requiring separate characters for each class.

=== The Outer Brood (2024) ===
EverQuest: The Outer Brood
- Developer: Daybreak Game Company
- Publisher: Daybreak Game Company
- Release: December 3, 2024

The Outer Brood is the thirty-first expansion for EverQuest, released on December 3, 2024. The story centers on an invasion of Norrath by the Outer Brood, a group of extraterrestrial dragons whose arrival threatens both the world's inhabitants and its native dragon populations. Alongside new areas to explore, players received additional missions, raids, spells, combat abilities, and alternate advancement options. The expansion expanded character creation by allowing Dark Elves to become Rangers and introduced the Activated Items Key Ring, a dedicated storage feature for reusable items with activatable effects not accommodated by existing key rings.

=== Shattering of Ro (2025) ===
EverQuest: Shattering of Ro
- Developer: Daybreak Game Company
- Publisher: Daybreak Game Company
- Release: December 2, 2025

Shattering of Ro is the thirty-second expansion for EverQuest, launched on December 2, 2025. Following the murder of Druzzil Ro, its narrative explores an escalating conflict among Norrath's gods, with events unfolding across the divine planes and threatening the mortal world. Six new zones provide the setting for further adventures, including quests, missions, and raid encounters. Character progression was extended through an increase in the level cap from 125 to 130, accompanied by new spells and alternate advancement abilities. Other changes included making the Druid class available to Vah Shir characters and adding two shared bank slots.

=== Favors of Fortune (2026) ===
EverQuest: Favors of Fortune
- Developer: Daybreak Game Company
- Publisher: Daybreak Game Company
- Release: December 2026

Favors of Fortune is the upcoming thirty-third expansion for EverQuest, scheduled for release in 2026. Continuing the events of Shattering of Ro, the story follows the return of Scorn and disturbances affecting luck and probability throughout Norrath's divine planes. In addition to further quests, missions, raid encounters, and character abilities, the expansion introduces the Bard class for Dark Elves. Another feature is the Collection Depot, designed to provide dedicated storage for collectible items. Preorders and beta testing commenced on October 6, 2026.

== Bundles ==
Between 2001 and 2007, Sony Online Entertainment released retail bundles that included the original EverQuest and a collection of expansion packs. The first compilations were the European EverQuest Deluxe Edition and North American EverQuest Trilogy, which included the base game, The Ruins of Kunark, and The Scars of Velious. Subsequent packages would be released almost yearly until the Anniversary Edition in April 2007, which included the base game and the first 13 expansions.

Title	Release date	Expansions	# Included
EverQuest Deluxe Edition	March 6, 2001 (EU)	The Ruins of Kunark, The Scars of Velious	2
EverQuest Trilogy	September 18, 2001 (NA)	The Ruins of Kunark, The Scars of Velious	2
EverQuest Gold Edition	March 22, 2002 (EU); November 4, 2002 (NA)	The Ruins of Kunark - Shadows of Luclin (EU); The Ruins of Kunark - The Planes of Power (NA)	3 (EU); 4 (NA)
EverQuest New Dawn (Note: Released as EverQuest Europa in the German and French localized versions.)	November 22, 2002 (EU)	The Ruins of Kunark - Shadows of Luclin	3
EverQuest Evolution	August 25, 2003 (NA)	The Ruins of Kunark - The Legacy of Ykesha	5
EverQuest Platinum	July 26, 2004 (NA)	The Ruins of Kunark - Gates of Discord	7
EverQuest Chronicles: Volume One	September 20, 2004 (NA)	The Ruins of Kunark, The Shadows of Luclin, The Legacy of Ykesha	3
EverQuest Titanium Edition	January 10, 2006 (NA)	The Ruins of Kunark - Depths of Darkhollow	10
EverQuest: The Anniversary Edition	April 16, 2007 (NA)	The Ruins of Kunark - The Buried Sea	13
