= Station.com =

Sony games website

Station.com was Sony Online Entertainment's portal that was the home to its many PC, console, casual and mobile games. It is the home to many MMOs including EverQuest, EverQuest II, The Matrix Online, PlanetSide, and Star Wars Galaxies, which have gained hundreds of thousands of paid subscribers.

While Station.com offers many free online games and trials, there are many "pay-to-play" games that require a "Station Subscription".

As a convenience to its subscribers, Daybreak provides a "all-in-one" packaged subscription called "Station Access" that provides access to all of its premium games.

== Arcade Games ==
Multiplayer (M), Downloadable (D), Browser Based (B)

- Astropop D, B
- Cosmic Rift D, M
- Diner Dash D
- Feeding Frenzy D, B
- Heavy Weapon D, B
- Infantry (computer game) D, M
- Insaniquarium D, B
- Luxor D
- Tanarus D, M
- Tumblebugs D
- Zuma GO! D, B

== Puzzle Games ==
Multiplayer (M), Downloadable (D), Browser Based (B)

- Alchemy Deluxe D, B
- Bejeweled 2 D, B
- Bewitched D, B
- Bounce Out Blitz D, B
- Charm Tale D
- Chuzzle Deluxe D
- Dynomite! D
- Fresco Wizard D
- Jewel Quest D
- Mah Jong Medley D, B
- Mah Jong Quest D
- Oasis D
- Puzzle Inlay D
- Rocket Mania D
- Shape Shifer D, B
- Super Collapse II D, B
- Super Game House Solitaire Vol. 1 D, B
- The Da Vinci Code D
- Tumblebugs D, B

== Trivia Games ==
Multiplayer (M), Downloadable (D), Browser Based (B)

- Bonnie's Bookstore D
- Bookworm D
- JEOPARDY! D, B
- JEOPARDY! 2 D
- Rock & Roll JEOPARDY! D, B
- Super Text Twist D, B
- Wheel of Fortune D, B
- Wheel of Fortune 2 D
- Word Slinger D

== Strategy Games ==
Multiplayer (M), Downloadable (D), Browser Based (B)

- Pirates Constructible Strategy Game Online M, D
- Stargate Online Trading Card Game M, D
- Star Chamber: The Harbinger Saga M, D

== MMO Games ==
- Cosmic Rift D, M
- EverQuest D, M
- EverQuest II D, M
- Free Realms B, M
- Infantry D, M
- PlanetSide D, M
- Star Wars Galaxies D, M
- Tanarus D, M
- The Matrix Online D, M
- Vanguard: Saga of Heroes D, M
- DC Universe Online D, M
