= Untold Legends =

Untold Legends is a series of role-playing video games that has three installments:

- Untold Legends: Brotherhood of the Blade, a PlayStation Portable launch title
- Untold Legends: The Warrior's Code, sequel to PSP game
- Untold Legends: Dark Kingdom, PlayStation 3 launch title
