= Bruce Woodcock =

Bruce Woodcock may refer to:

- Bruce Woodcock (boxer) (1920–1997), English heavyweight boxer
- Bruce Woodcock (computer games analyst) (born 1970), American computer games analyst
