= Cosmic Rift =

2001 video game

- Publisher: Sony Online Entertainment
- Designer: Jeff Petersen
- Platform: Microsoft Windows
- Release: NA: April 17, 2001
- Genre: Action
- Mode: Multiplayer

Cosmic Rift was a two-dimensional massively multiplayer video game designed by lead programmer Jeff Petersen. It is based in a science fiction universe wherein players could fly from an overhead view one of 13 spaceships, each with their own strengths and unique weapons, in a variety of gaming zones each with a different objective.

== History ==
Screenshot of a generic zone portraying the basic game play system and graphical interface, which bear resemblance to those of the game SubSpace.

Cosmic Rift was provided as part of the Station Pass package offered by Sony Online Entertainment, which also included Infantry and Tanarus. Its gameplay is comparable to Virgin Interactive Entertainment's Subspace, another two-dimensional space shooter written by Jeff Petersen prior to joining Sony's team. Today, Subspace remains available in a freeware flavor known as Continuum.

Cosmic Rift was released as an open beta in April 2001, which lasted until May 2002. From this point forward players were required to pay a monthly fee to gain full access to any of the Station Pass games, with limited capability permitted to non-subscribers.

One of the largest draws for subscribers was the 4 on 4 league which sustained the generally low popularity of the game until August 2004, when the league completed its sixth and final season. The remaining subscribers lingered for approximately one year playing only in the Rift Ball league until August 2005. Since the end of this league, the Cosmic Rift's player base had been essentially non-existent.

Starting in June 2007, all the Station Pass games, including Cosmic Rift, became completely free. A map editor for both Cosmic Rift and Infantry has also been worked on in the hope that they will be publicly released by the time the three Station Pass games become free. Initially it prompted an increase in the population of the game's servers, but despite these efforts, the game's population still remained largely insubstantial.

=== Closing ===
Cosmic Rift, Infantry, Star Chamber: The Harbinger Saga, and EverQuest Online Adventures were shut down in March 2012.

The reason given by Sony Online Entertainment for the closings was that development resources for those titles would be better put to use on developing newer games.

== Gaming Zones ==
- Alpha Zone: Team or solo free for all with no objective but to destroy any enemy ships, and was intended for beginners.
- Chaos Zone: Team or solo free for all with no objective but to destroy any enemy ships, and was intended for experts.
- Conquest: Teams were associated with a particular base, which they had to defend, while simultaneously attempting to overwhelm the bases of opposing teams.
- CRPL: Stands for Cosmic Rift Players League, which organized four on four matches with limited lives for each player.
- Dueling Zone: Intended for solo one on one matches, with small team or free for all combat permitted.
- Rift Ball: Two teams competed in a format similar to soccer, and the objective was to score goals with a Rift Ball that was passed between ships. Combat was permitted while controlling this ball.
- Rogue Trader: An RPG based game where the objective was to earn money via gathering minerals, and destroying enemy ships. The money could be used to purchase improvements to one's ship that remained persistent across multiple sessions.
- Scrimmage
- Seek and Destroy: One player possessed a flag, and the opposing players had to destroy this particular ship which then moved control of the flag to the killer. Victory went to the team which held the flag for a set period of time.
- Speed Zone: The objective was to destroy as many enemy ships possible in a limited time frame.
- Super Fortress: Eight flags which were randomly distributed across the map had to be gathered by a team and held for a set period of time.
- Total War: Two teams played against each other with the intent to destroy the opposing team's base. The base came equipped with computer-controlled turrets.
- Gravity Well: This zone was not online, but the premise consisted of multiple gravity wells that could destroy one's craft, and weapons that could be obtained for destroying other ships.
