= ForgeLight =

MMO game engine

- Developer: Daybreak Games

ForgeLight is a proprietary MMO game engine developed and used by Daybreak Game Company (formerly Sony Online Entertainment). The engine has been used for Free Realms, Clone Wars Adventures, PlanetSide 2, Landmark, EverQuest Next, H1Z1: Just Survive, H1Z1: King of the Kill. The engine was nominated for the 2013 Game Developers Choice Awards Best Technology award.

== Features ==
The ForgeLight engine was initially developed by Sony Online Entertainment (SOE) to support the studio's massively multiplayer online games, but can be modified to support nearly any type of multiplayer online game. As such, the engine supports high player counts of up to 2,000 on a single game server. The engine allows game clients to render over 200 players at once without sacrificing high quality graphics or decreasing framerates. Much unlike other game engines, ForgeLight does not use traditional zones for virtual environments, but rather allows players to traverse through one seamless game world without loading screens between distinct areas. Games using ForgeLight can support high level of computer facial animation and allow players to change character expressions based on input or from a webcam. The engine builds upon the Nvidia PhysX API, which allows it to support realistic vehicle simulation, particle effects, and other physics-based features in games. Dynamic weather effects, such as rainstorms that move from region to region and affect gameplay and environments, are supported by the engine. It also allows for volumetric lighting, volumetric fog, cloud shadows, dynamic reflection, and real-time radiosity, as well as a day/night cycle.

The ForgeLight engine is primarily single-threaded, but has been modified to better support multithreading prior to the release of games using the ForgeLight engine on the PlayStation 4 and Xbox One. The engine's renderer, originally supporting only DirectX 9, has also been upgraded to support DirectX 11 in PlanetSide 2. Water-based visuals and mechanics, including buoyancy physics and projectile drag, are supported by the ForgeLight engine and were added in a PlanetSide 2 update.

== Games using ForgeLight ==
- Free Realms (2009)
- Clone Wars Adventures (2010)
- PlanetSide 2 (2012)
- Just Survive (2015)
- EverQuest Next (2016)
- Landmark (2016)
- Z1 Battle Royale (2018)
- PlanetSide Arena (2019)
