= David Wu (disambiguation) =

David Wu (born 1955) is a Democratic member of the U.S. House of Representatives for Oregon.

David Wu may also refer to:

- David Wu (American actor) (born 1966), Taiwanese-born Chinese-American film actor, TV personality and former Channel V VJ
- David Wu (Hong Kong actor), naturalized Canadian film director, former Hong Kong kung fu film actor
- David Wu (entrepreneur) (born 1970), founder and CEO of RotoHog.com
- S. David Wu, president of Baruch College of the City University of New York
