= Bruce Sterling (disambiguation) =

Bruce Sterling (born 1954) is an American science fiction author.

Bruce Sterling or Bruce Stirling may also refer to:

- Bruce F. Sterling (1870–1946), U.S. representative from Pennsylvania
- Bruce Sterling (Love of Life), fictional character in an American soap opera
- Bruce Sterling Jenkins (born 1927), American attorney, politician, and jurist
- Bruce Sterling Woodcock (born 1970), American computer and video games industry analyst
- Bruce Stirling (runner) (born 1964), American middle-distance runner, 1987 All-American for the Washington Huskies track and field team
