= SubSpace (video game) =

SubSpace: The Internet Game
- Developer: Burst Studios
- Publisher: Virgin Interactive
- Director: Michael Simpson
- Producer: Rod Humble
- Programmers: Jeff Petersen; Jerod M. Bennett; Robin Keir
- Artist: Juan L. Sanchez
- Composers: David Fries; Mical Pedriana
- Platform: Windows
- Release: December 1997
- Genre: Action
- Mode: Multiplayer

SubSpace is a 2D space shooter video game created in 1995 and released in 1997 by Virgin Interactive which was a finalist for the Academy of Interactive Arts & Sciences Online Game of the Year Award in 1998. SubSpace incorporates quasi-realistic zero-friction physics into a massively multiplayer online game.

The game is no longer operated by VIE; instead, fans and players of the game provide servers and technical updates.

The action is viewed from above, which presents challenges very different from those of a three-dimensional game. The game has no built-in story or set of goals; players may enter a variety of servers, each of which have differing objectives, maps, sounds, and graphics.

SubSpace is considered an early entry in the massively multiplayer online genre due to its unprecedented player counts.

== History ==
SubSpace evolved from a game originally called Sniper (1995), a project to test the effects and severity of lag in a massively multiplayer environment over dialup connections.

After its creators realized its viability as an actual game, public beta testing began in February, 1996, and it became fully public later that year.

The game was released commercially in December 1997 with a list price of US$27.99 for unlimited play, requiring no monthly or hourly fees. The game was originally developed by Burst, led by Jeff Petersen, Rod Humble and Juan Sanchez, for the US branch of the now-defunct Virgin Interactive. The title was showcased at E3 1997.

When the game was officially released, it was not a commercial success due to a lack of marketing and the relative newness of internet gaming. Two years of playing for free became problematic as many players refused to pay for a game that they had beta tested for two years, and instead opted to pirate the software.

SubSpace server software being distributed with the commercial release of the game allowed users to host their own servers on their own computers, enabling them to preserve the game.

Once VIE went under in 1998, many of its remaining US assets were purchased by Electronic Arts, but the SubSpace license was not.

This caused all of the commercially hosted servers, including the official VIE servers, to eventually go offline permanently, and independent user-run servers became the only choice for hosting zones, including original zones previously hosted by VIE.

== Gameplay ==
SubSpace players control one of eight ships which are equipped with weapons and a variety of special abilities. These ships are the Warbird, Javelin, Spider, Leviathan, Terrier, Weasel, Lancaster, and Shark. Players interact with each other in zones, which are typically split into multiple arenas. Players in each arena are then divided into teams; friendly ships appear as yellow, while enemy ships appear blue. The keyboard is used exclusively for control of the ship and use of in-game chat functions.

Although each zone can have its own unique style of gameplay, certain basic gameplay mechanics are ubiquitous throughout all zones.

=== Map elements ===
Each arena uses a 1024x1024 map as the field of play. Some arenas may use the entire size of the map, while others may enclose the players in a smaller space. A coordinate system (A-T horizontal, 1–20 vertical) allows players to easily identify and communicate where they are on the map.

Maps may contain obstacles such as walls or asteroids which cannot be moved or destroyed. Maps often use gates, which open and close at random or regular intervals. If a player's ship gets caught in a gate when it closes, the ship is relocated ("warped") to a random location on the map.

Safe zones allow a players to evade enemies or simply take a break from the game. While in a safe zone, a ship cannot take damage but also cannot fire. Most safe zones have a time limit; players who stay in a safe zone too long are kicked from the game and must rejoin the zone. This prevents players from camping out in a safe zone and leaving their computer idle for an extended period of time in order to maintain their state in the game.

A flag or ball may be present as well. Their importance and role in the game depend on the zone.

The most common map elements in SubSpace are prizes, or "greens" (for their green color). Prizes allow players to upgrade their ships and gain special weapons or abilities. While prizes are generally plentifully scattered throughout the map, the upgrades or abilities they award are randomly selected by the zone.

=== Energy ===
Rather than dealing with ammunition counts and hit points separately, SubSpace combines both of these elements into a single unit of measure: energy. Each ship is equipped with a certain amount of energy, from which it must draw its health as well as its weapons power. When a ship's energy is reduced from its capacity (whether from firing weapons or enduring enemy fire), the ship will automatically recharge back to its maximum capacity over a period of time; however, sustained weapons fire or enemy fire will inevitably cause the energy to drop lower.

Once the ship's energy drops below zero, the ship is destroyed and the player is respawned elsewhere in the area. Any upgrades, weapons, or special abilities are lost. The energy mechanic forces players to be cautious of their energy usage, as reckless weapons fire could result in a quick death.

It is usually not possible for players to commit suicide; if a player's own weapon causes more damage than that player has energy, the player's energy will simply be reduced to one and begin recharging. However, suicide was possible in early beta versions of the game and the offline practice mode included with the original SubSpace client.

=== Ship Control ===
Thrust (Up for forward, Down for reverse) and rotation (Left for counter-clockwise, Right for clockwise) make up the basic movement of the ship. Ships maintain inertia once they are set in motion and cannot be brought to a complete stop except when in a safe zone. In addition, ships experience inelastic collisions with walls and asteroids but do not take damage from them. Ships do not collide with each other.

Players achieve their ship's top speed by maintaining thrust. Each ship is also equipped with afterburners (Shift+Up/Down) which allow the ship to exceed its typical top speed; however, this gradually drains the ship's energy. When afterburners are disengaged, the ship's inertia returns to its normal top speed, not its speed with afterburners.

Ships can instantly warp (Ins) to a random location on the map. This action requires the ship to be at full energy, and its energy is totally drained once the warp is complete, although the ship will begin recharging its energy immediately.

Ships may also attach to other friendly ships. In this scenario, the attaching ship loses thrust control and becomes a weapons turret on the back of another ship. This is technically achieved by performing a warp, thus requiring full energy to attach and draining energy in the process. A turret ship takes damage like a normal ship and may detach at any time. In addition, a ship carrying turrets may detach one or all of them at any time.

=== Scoring ===
Players primarily increase their score by killing other players. Each ship has a bounty, which is increased by collecting prizes, killing enemies, or other in-game mechanics. When a ship is killed, its bounty is added to the killer's score.

Each zone implements its own scoring system and may award bonuses for certain achievements.

=== Competitive Play ===
Many SubSpace players are organized into squads. These squadrons serve the same purpose as clans or teams do in other online games and allow players to cooperate and improve their skills, as well as to become more familiar with fellow players. In addition, many squads compete in competitive leagues hosted by various zones. Dueling is another favorite pastime and many zones have separate arenas for this purpose alone.

=== Ships ===
Within any given zone, a player can choose between up to eight different ships: Warbird, Javelin, Spider, Leviathan, Terrier, Weasel, Lancaster, and Shark.

=== Standard VIE Settings ===
Standard VIE Settings, SVS for short, (also referred to as Standard SubSpace Settings) is a server configuration conforming to the physics and rules used in non-special game types hosted by Virgin Interactive Entertainment (VIE) before the company's dissolution. The term is sometimes used informally to describe servers which seek, through other means, to preserve the spirit of the game as it was originally played.

== Zones ==
Gameplay can vary depending on the zone. Some zones are just free-for-all style gameplay, while others are capture the flag, or even powerball style. Zones typically have multiple public arenas, whose settings and maps are the same, which players are automatically distributed to upon joining the server. This serves to reduce crowding in highly populated arenas.

There are also numerous sub-arenas in SubSpace, and these sub-arenas can at times have greater populations than the "main/public" arenas. They differ from the main public arenas, in the sense that they may have their own settings, map, graphics, and bots (if required – or modules in ASSS zones).

=== Flag Games ===
- War – Standard flag game whose name is derived from its original zone (War Zone). The objective is to claim all flags for one's own team. Flags can be picked up by opponents only. Flags that are picked up are dropped after a set time. Flagging games usually involve bases to store flags and are heavily team-oriented.
- Bounty Rabbit – One player is the rabbit, and has the 'flag'. The rabbit's kills are worth 101 points while a regular players' kills are only worth 1 point. Kill the current rabbit to become the new rabbit. The player with the most points at the end of the game wins. This game is usually run by bots in a main arena or sub-arenas.
- Turf – Territorial flag game in which flags are located at specific locations around the map. Ownership is claimed by simply passing over the flag by any player. Turf games can either be won or involve periodic point rewards.
- Basing – Similar to Turf, except there is a base with one flag. The team that controls that flag controls the base, and thus the base is often completely populated by the controlling team. Trench Wars is an example of a popular basing game.
- Running – Flags in running zones do not have drop timers, and may only be claimed by killing an opponent carrying flags or picking up neutral flags. Variants include Rabbit Chase.

=== Kill Games ===
"Kill" games have no 'rounds' or 'games'; the objective is simply to kill as many opponents as possible while keeping one's own deaths to a minimum. The original Alpha and Chaos zones followed this basic premise.

However, some zones offer their own variants of this style of gameplay:

- King of the Hill – Each player starts off with a crown, which may be lost if the set amount of time runs out. A player's timer, which is displayed at the top right of the screen, is reset every time they kill another player. However, if a player has already lost their crown, they may only regain it by either killing a flagger with a crown (sometimes marked by a red dot on the radar), or by destroying any two players. Generally though, flaggers with low bounty do not give others their crown. The game is then won when there is only one crowned player left standing.
- Speed – Each round of a Speed game has a time limit. The winner of a round is the player with the most kills for the round. In Speed Zone, ships began with a higher "bounty" (and more weapons and other power ups) than in other zones. Speed Zone proved to be less popular than the Jackpot/Running, Chaos, or "flag" zone games and support was discontinued shortly after SubSpace went to retail.

=== Ball Games ===
Ball games involve taking control of a ball and scoring it in the opposing team's goal. Players cannot fire weapons or warp while carrying the ball, and can only carry the ball for a few seconds. Before the ball timer runs out, they must pass the ball to a teammate (using Ins, Tab, or Ctrl keys), or the ball will shoot out from their ship in a random direction. If a player dies while carrying the ball, the ball is dropped immediately and may be picked up by anyone. A team wins a game when they achieve a certain number of goals, or the game may be timed, with the highest-scoring team winning when time expires.

- Hockey simulates futuristic ice hockey in a space setting. the "ball" is the equivalent of the hockey puck. Each ship's settings have been modified to fit that ship into a unique role on the team; for instance, Lancasters and Sharks are "goalie" ships. the Warbird, Javelin and Weasel are Forwards, Spiders and Terriers make up the midfield, and the Levithan is a defensive beast. The rules of the game are based on real hockey rules with some variations due to the 2d nature of the game.
- Powerball (Soccer) – is similar to hockey, in that it also features two teams (Warbirds and Javelins) and goals at opposite ends of a symmetrical map. Powerball primarily uses SVS settings, except that the Warbird and Javelin have identical ship settings, creating two evenly matched teams. Each ship starts with 100 bounty and comes "greened" with a number of basic upgrades and randomly selected special abilities (e.g. burst, repel, etc.). It is not possible to choose any other type of ship. Although scoring goals is the primary objective of Powerball, shooting and killing other players is very much an important part of the game.

=== Customization ===
A zone is a server to which players can connect using a client. Perhaps the most attractive feature of SubSpace is the extremely high degree of customization that zone sysops can implement. Almost every element of the game can be replaced, from the ship graphics to colors and sounds. Apart from a few basic settings, many game settings, such as ship speeds, energy levels, and such, can be changed. This allows a vast variety of zones to exist.

== Game software ==
SubSpace utilizes a client–server architecture. Initially, both the client and server were provided by VIE. The client executable was titled SubSpace while the server was called SubGame. A new client, titled Continuum, was created by reverse engineering without access to the original source code by the players PriitK (one of the creators of Kazaa) and Mr Ekted. The original server software, heavily modified, is still the most common, although an open source alternative, A Small Subspace Server, is now available.

=== Continuum client ===
Continuum Interface

Continuum, first released in 2001, was developed as a clone of the SubSpace client, but now contains new original features exclusive to the client over the original. Continuum is the official client of the SubSpace Central Billing Server. It was developed primarily because of the original SubSpace client's failure to prevent hacking. As such, it has been adopted by several zones as a requirement in order to play.

=== A Small SubSpace Server ===
ASSS (A Small SubSpace Server) is an open source server designed for use on Linux and other Unix-like operating systems, but can be configured for use on Microsoft Windows. Both are downloadable from Bitbucket. ASSS is under active development.

=== Re-release ===
Continuum was released in the fan-reconstructed variant in digital distribution on Steam on July 3, 2015.

== Reception ==
In 1997 Next Generation named SubSpace as number four on their "Top 10 Online Game Picks", reasoning that "Its minimal bandwidth requirements mean pretty damn good gameplay, and the software pings the various arenas to see where you'll receive the lowest latency. Nicely done: simple, addictive, and really multiplayer." During the inaugural Interactive Achievement Awards, SubSpace received a nomination for "Online Game of the Year" by the Academy of Interactive Arts & Sciences.

== See also ==
- XPilot
- Infantry
- Cosmic Rift
- Altitude (video game)
- List of MMOGs
