= Lords of EverQuest =

2003 video game

- European cover art
- Developer: Rapid Eye Entertainment
- Publishers: Sony Online Entertainment (North America); Ubi Soft (Europe)
- Designer: Neal Hallford
- Platform: Microsoft Windows
- Release: NA: December 1, 2003; EU: December 5, 2003
- Genre: Real-time strategy
- Modes: Single-player, multiplayer

Lords of EverQuest is a 3D fantasy real-time strategy game released in December 2003. It was developed by the short-lived startup company Rapid Eye Entertainment and published by Sony Online Entertainment (SOE). SOE distributes Lords of EverQuest.

Unlike the original EverQuest, Lords of EverQuest is fundamentally a single player game, and after the initial payment for the software, does not require a recurring monthly fee in order to play.

== Reception ==
Reception

Aggregate score
Aggregator	Score
Metacritic	62/100

Review scores
Publication	Score
Computer Gaming World	3/5
Game Informer	7.5/10
GamePro	3.5/5
GameRevolution	B
GameSpot	5.5/10
GameSpy	2/5
GameZone	7.2/10
IGN	6.5/10
PC Format	61%
PC Gamer (US)	58%

The game received "mixed" reviews according to video game review aggregator Metacritic. IGN reviewer Tom McNamara praised its multiplayer experience, but overall considered the game mediocre and decried it for focusing heavily on uninteresting combat fueled by only a single resource. The developer, Rapid Eye Entertainment, closed down after the release of the game.
