= Fastpoint Games =

Former game developer

- Website type: Games and Entertainment
- Founded: 2006
- Dissolved: 2012
- Owners: Sports Composite DE, Inc.
- Website: www.fastpointgames.com
- Commercial: Yes
- Registration: None
- Launched: In 2006 as RotoHog and 2010 as Fastpoint Games
- Current status: Defunct

Fastpoint Games was a developer of data-driven games for businesses in the Fortune 500. It was the successor parent company of fantasy sports developer, RotoHog, which was founded in 2006. The company was based in Santa Monica, California.

Under the Fastpoint Games banner, the company had applied RotoHog's configurable game platform to use structured data to drive consumer engagement and help brands in markets like social media, entertainment, massively multiplayer online games (MMOs), politics and regulated gaming to grow their audience, engage their users and monetize them.

On 7 January 2011, Fastpoint Games and Sony Online Entertainment announced the alpha launch of the Facebook game Fortune League. The casual strategy game was based on the world of EverQuest II (EQII). In Fortune League, players assessed quests, hero performance, situational threats and the actions of other players in a live trade market that compensated leaders with points, cosmetic upgrades and prizes that can be used in the free-to-play and subscription versions of EQII. Fortune League integrated real-time performance data such as damages, deaths and healings directly from the MMO environment and uses them to form Hero Stats that drive the game. Therefore, player actions inside EQII will affect what happens in Fortune League and prizes from Fortune League will help users advance back in the EQII environment. Fastpoint Games CEO, Kelly Perdew, positions Fortune League as a new category of snackable data-driven games that will help MMO franchises acquire users and tap new revenue streams.

Between September 2009 and November 2010, the company expanded from fantasy sports to entertainment and casual games, partnering with social media platforms including hi5, Facebook and MySpace. Fastpoint released 58 games for 16 clients across 21 sports and entertainment seasons for clients including Us Weekly, NASCAR, ABC, Los Angeles Times, Go Daddy.com and Sports Illustrated online.

On 11 July 2011, Fortune League was sunsetted. In October 2011, the company announced that it was "winding down" and seeking a buyer. Weplay acquired the assets of Fastpoint Games in May 2012.

== See also ==
- RotoHog
- Fantasy Sports
