= Bullet Run =

2012 video game

- Bullet Run Logo
- Developer: ACONY
- Publisher: Sony Online Entertainment
- Platform: Microsoft Windows
- Release: 31 July 2012
- Genre: First-person shooter
- Mode: Multiplayer

Bullet Run was a free-to-play online multiplayer first-person shooter video game developed by German studio ACONY and published by Sony Online Entertainment in 2012.

On 1 February 2013, Sony Online Entertainment announced that the game would be shut down on 8 March 2013. The game was shut down at 12:00PM ET. SOE refunded all the platinum memberships starting 1 February 2013.

== Gameplay ==
The game takes place in a staged reality TV show studio where contestants battle in a televised arena with cameras and commentators on the sidelines capturing the battle to be broadcast worldwide. Combatants battle to achieve worldwide fame and glory.

Bullet Run features online team based multiplayer combat. Up to 20 players can battle in one of the game's 5 maps called 'arenas.' The game included three game modes, Team Deathmatch, Search & Destroy, and Dominion (which is similar to King of the Hill). More game modes were also planned until developers announced the game was to be shut down. Players also can wield experimental and exotic weapons. Players may use four abilities called skills that are unlocked as a match goes on. Upon killing another player, players can use the keyboard to taunt the losing player, earning the player "heat", the game's in-game currency.

== Reception ==
Reception

Aggregate score
Aggregator	Score
Metacritic	53/100

Review scores
Publication	Score
GameSpot	5.5/10
PC Gamer (US)	32/100

The game was described to be "pay-to-win" rather than "free-to-play." The game currently holds a score of 53/100 on Metacritic. PC Gamer reviewer Phil Savage gave the game a review score of 32/100 and stated that the game would "incessantly hound you to purchase SOE’s Station Cash." He also stated that it was an "insipid shooter with limited maps." Joystiq reviewer Mike Schramm noted the game's lack of balance in his review: "Skills do mix up the action, but they don't seem well-balanced: I went into an akimbo mode at one point, and was able to trounce the entire enemy team without too many problems. Fun for me, not so much for them, I'm sure."
