= PoxNora =

- Developers: Octopi Media Design Lab; Sony Online Entertainment; Desert Owl Games
- Producer: Luke Bultman
- Designers: Dan Kopycienski; Arthur Griffith; Justin Felker; Brian Dellinger; Bryan Rypkowski
- Platforms: Java, PlayStation Vita, PlayStation 4
- Release: NA: August 1, 2006
- Genres: Turn-based strategy, collectible card game
- Modes: Single-player, multiplayer

PoxNora: Battlefield of the Immortals is a multiplayer online game that combines a digital collectible card game with a turn-based strategy game in a fantasy setting. PoxNora was originally launched via Java Web Start through a browser and can be played on Microsoft Windows, Mac OS X, and Linux. The game is free to play with "Sample Battlegroups", and players can purchase additional game pieces, called "runes", and build their own strategies. The game currently includes more than 1600 runes. The game was originally designed and developed by Octopi Media Design Lab, which as of January 2009 became owned by and operated by Sony Online Entertainment. This division of SOE was formerly referred to as SOETucson (because Octopi's headquarters was located in Tucson, Arizona). SOE closed down the Tucson studio in April 2011 along with its Seattle and Denver studios, laying off over 200 employees in the process. Some members of the PoxNora team were moved to the San Diego HQ to continue development.

== Gameplay ==
Screenshot of Poxnora

Screenshot of Poxnora

Screenshot of Poxnora

Players build decks, called "Battle-groups", on PoxNora's website. A Battlegroup consists of thirty runes in any combination of spells, relics, equipment and champions. The game is launched via Java Web Start and players enter one of four game lobbies where they can chat or enter games. A fifth game lobby is reserved solely for trading discussion. Games consist of two players, though matches against AI "bots" are possible now with the release of single-player campaigns, first introduced in the "Path to Conquest" expansion.

Each player's Battlegroup is shuffled (like a deck of cards) and (in standard settings) players reveal two runes per turn (except the first turn, when four are revealed and the second player's first turn, in which five runes are revealed). The game is played on one of 8 different square, "tiled" maps with various obstacles, fonts, and a Shrine representing each player. The first to destroy their opponent's Shrine wins.

Players accumulate Nora (magical energy) each turn and can use it to cast spells, deploy champions, place relics, or use equipment. When a champion rune is played, it appears on the game map and can be moved around, just like any other tactical roleplaying game. Champion movement is limited by their Action Points (AP), which they regenerate at the start of the player's turn. Champions gain Champion Points (CP) as they participate in battles. Players can spend CP to improve or add to their champion's abilities. Tokens can be used to increase the CP of a champion by 25, 50, 100, or 200, depending on which token is used. Tokens are obtained through purchasing traditional booster packs or separate token packs. Tokens can be traded with other players for alternative tokens or runes.

The game can be played free. Originally, to be able to upgrade runes, or to trade for other runes, it was necessary to purchase runes. A player reward system with "gold" that can be earned in-game now allows access to all aspects of the game with no cash transactions, though some runes are unavailable for gold and must be traded for. Every booster pack has a set number of rarity slots. The premium subscription gives access to Premium Campaigns, store discounts, the possibility of being allowed the privilege of beta testing upcoming expansion runes, the ability to convert runes from "crafting recipes", and an added option to obtain a few "Limited Edition" runes that would otherwise not appear with the individually purchased packs.

Players trade runes to obtain better runes or to make a better deck. There are several "rune shops" in the Trader forum that can give players a good idea of what their runes are worth.

Two versus two was recently added to PoxNora. In this mode each person uses a whole 30 rune Battlegroup, uses their own nora, and generates the same nora as their teammate (ability and spell based nora gains are not added to both players banks, only the owner). In casual play player battlegroups must be either Full-Faction (30 runes of the same faction) or Split-Faction.

Likewise, Theme Decks were also implemented recently. Players can purchase a pre-made deck from each faction and choose to only battle opponents using Theme Decks.

== Factions ==
PoxNora factions

PoxNora's world is divided among eight factions. Each rune belongs to a particular faction. Players receive bonuses if their Battlegroups have at least 15 runes of a given faction and a greater bonus if all 30 runes are from the same faction. An additional Shrine Bonus is activated by having 15 runes of a faction. Factions can be split into 15 runes from two factions called "split factions", creating a multitude of options within the game.

== Expansions ==
PoxNora expansions are released in regular intervals, usually a few months, with a Midterm Legendary (limited time availability) in between. The expansions usually contain at least 5 Runes (cards) of each faction, often either expanding a theme within the faction or creating a new theme. Each faction receive champions, relics, spells and equipment runes. Runes are generally tweaked during the first week or so of each expansion release due to balance issues but such hotfixes and patches occur frequently as the game develops.

== Steam integration ==
PoxNora was made available to Steam in December 2011. This has caused the game to have a surge of growth.

== Free-to-play ==
Previously, PoxNora operated as a potential free to play online game through the use of a Fragment system. With this system, a player could obtain Fragments from Campaigns (single-player mode) with the rarity of the Fragment depending upon the difficulty of the Campaign as well as the selection of the Campaign. These Fragments could be used to craft runes. This system has been replaced with a broader Gold system that accumulates in both single and multiplayer play.

The PoxNora Marketplace supported premium game purchases through Station Cash (used in all games published by Sony Online Entertainment). In the marketplace users can access packs, theme decks, avatars, campaigns and more. Since the change in ownership of the game, this system has been supplanted by the use of an in-house currency system.

== Ownership change ==
In April 2014, Sony Online Entertainment sold PoxNora to Desert Owl Games, a company that includes some of the original game developers from Octopi.

== Reception ==
PoxNora was a runner-up for Computer Games Magazine's list of the top 10 computer games of 2006.
