= Infantry (video game) =

1999 video game

Infantry Online
- Developer: Harmless eGames LLC
- Publisher: Sony Online Entertainment
- Designer: Player Content Team
- Platform: Windows
- Release: 1999
- Genre: Combat MMOG
- Mode: Multiplayer

Infantry, also known as Infantry Online, is a multiplayer combat video game. Originally released in 1999, the game was taken offline by Sony Online Entertainment and the servers shut down in March 2012.

== Gameplay ==
Screenshot (from Mechanized Skirmish) of Infantry Online.

Infantry Online uses sprite animation graphics to model complex soldier, ground vehicle and space-ship models on typically complex terrains. Players may choose from a list of game zones to enter, each zone having a unique style of gameplay and many offering a wide diversity of weapons, player classes and objectives.

== History ==
In 1997, the now-defunct development team Virgin Interactive Entertainment (VIE) released the 2D space shooter, SubSpace. Members of the SubSpace development formed Harmless Games LLC and developed Infantry during the late 1990s. Brainscan Development Corporation, also known as Brainscan Interactive, became publisher until GameFan, the parent company of Brainscan Interactive, went bankrupt.

By October 2000 Sony Online Entertainment (SOE) began an acquisition of Infantry. Harmless Games, and its sole game, Infantry, was bought by SOE from Brainscan Interactive for an undisclosed sum. The lead designer Rodvik Humble, together with other developers, was offered a job with SOE to continue development of the game. Cosmic Rift, meant to compete with the still popular SubSpace, was developed as an offshoot of Infantry.

In May 2002, SOE introduced a monthly $6.95 pay-to-play system for SOE's three small action games: Infantry, Cosmic Rift and Tanarus, but both Infantry and Cosmic Rift remained free to play with limitations.

Starting in June 2007, SOE gave full and free online gaming access to Infantry and the rest of their "Station Pass" games.

Sony Online Entertainment shut down the Infantry Online servers at the end of March 2012.
