= EverQuest Next =

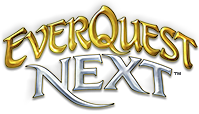
- Developer: Daybreak Game Company
- Publisher: Daybreak Game Company
- Writer: Steve Danuser
- Composers: Jeremy Soule; Inon Zur (early testing only)
- Series: EverQuest
- Engine: ForgeLight
- Platforms: Microsoft Windows, PlayStation 4
- Release: Cancelled
- Genre: Massively multiplayer online role-playing game

EverQuest Next was a planned massively multiplayer online role-playing game (MMORPG), meant to be the successor to EverQuest, EverQuest Online Adventures and EverQuest II. The game was in development by the Daybreak Game Company, but the project was terminated in 2016.

The game was not planned to be a sequel or prequel to any of the games in the EverQuest franchise; it was planned to present to players a "parallel world" of Norrath, one in which some of the locations and characters may be familiar, but specific relationships and events can diverge from the official storylines of the other games. The developers had stated an intention to return to a style of gameplay more like the original EverQuest, while retaining the advances in MMORPG design that have developed in the years since that game first launched.

== Development ==
The first indication that a new game was in development appeared in a chapter written by EverQuest creative director Rich Waters in the EverQuest 10th Anniversary Book (2009).

At the Sony Online Entertainment Live 2012 event, John Smedley stated that EverQuest Next has been completely redeveloped: "What we are building is something that we will be very proud to call EverQuest. It will be the largest sandbox style MMO ever designed... We are remaking Norrath unlike anything you've ever seen, but you'll recognize it". During Sony Online Entertainment Live, John Smedley mentioned that EverQuest Next will attempt to keep the free-to-play model for as long as possible. This means that once a player has purchased the game, they will not be required to pay a subscription fee in order to continue to play.

At PAX East 2013, game developer Dave Georgeson confirmed a full reveal of EverQuest Next on August 2 at SOE Live. EverQuest Next was intended to be subdivided into two segments: a standard, quest-based MMORPG, and a world-building tool called Landmark. John Smedley has said that the best of Landmark's player-made worlds would have been brought into the MMORPG.

On January 31, 2014, EverQuest Next's counterpart Landmark began its official alpha testing phase. Purchasers of the $99.99 Founders Pack or the $59.99 Explorers Pack were allowed into this alpha testing as part of the game developers goal of "making development a collaborative process". Landmark began its closed-beta testing on March 26.

The same year in January, John Smedley confirmed that EverQuest Next would be coming to the PlayStation 4 console. Later in February, on Reddit, John Smedley announced that the game would support the Oculus Rift, "in some way shape or form".

In August, at SOE Live, the EverQuest Next team revealed three new classes: the Tempest, the Cleric and the Elementalist. Brand-new combat videos showing off how players work together were also shown at the event.

By June 2015, Daybreak shifted the main development focus of the team from Landmark to EverQuest Next.

In March 2016, Daybreak discontinued the development of the game.
