= Cash Guns Chaos =

2006 video game

- Developer: Sony Online Entertainment
- Publisher: Sony Online Entertainment
- Platform: PlayStation 3
- Release: November 17, 2006
- Genre: Multidirectional shooter
- Modes: Single-player, multiplayer

Cash Guns Chaos DLX is a 2006 multidirectional shooter video game developed and published by Sony Online Entertainment for the PlayStation 3. It was released on the PlayStation Store . It was one of two games available for download when the PlayStation 3 was launched.

== Gameplay ==
Cash Guns Chaos DLX is a multidirectional shooter. Aliens, which learned the human civilization exclusively by watching 1970s, and 1980s TV shows, kidnapped the player and forced them to play through levels to entertain the aliens.

== Reception ==
Cash Guns Chaos received poor reviews from critics. Alex Navarro of GameSpot gave the game a 4.7/10 and criticized the gameplay, level design and art style. Jeremy Dunham of IGN was similarly negative towards the game, giving it a 4.1/10 and describing it as being "boring", "predictable", "frustrating", and "repetitive".
