= Clone Wars Adventures =

2010 video game

- Developer: Sony Online Entertainment
- Publisher: Sony Online Entertainment
- Engine: ForgeLight
- Platforms: Microsoft Windows, OS X
- Release: September 15, 2010
- Genres: Massively multiplayer online, adventure, digital collectible card game
- Mode: Multiplayer

Clone Wars Adventures was an online virtual world based on the animated television series Star Wars: The Clone Wars. Players could create and customize in-world avatars and participate in a variety of Clone Wars-themed mini-games and activities, earning Republic credits to purchase new weapons, outfits, ships, and furniture. Clone Wars Adventures was free to download and play, but only those with a paid membership got access to a majority of the game's features. Additionally, many outfits and premium items could only be purchased with Station Cash, a form of in game currency that players needed to purchase with real money instead of in-game credits. This massively multiplayer online game follows a similar business model to Free Realms. However, unlike Free Realms, the game was released at retail, though the game is free-to-play.

Clone Wars Adventures reached one of its milestones after 10 million players registered for the game. The first ten million players who joined were given a free Golden Death Watch set and a huge presentation of game statistics from Sony Online Entertainment, or SOE (now Daybreak Game Company), since the game's launch. On January 24, 2014, SOE announced that the game would be shut down on March 31, 2014.

== Setting ==
The in-game world of Clone Wars Adventures was set in the Jedi Temple on Coruscant set between the Star Wars films Attack of the Clones and Revenge of the Sith. Here, players could interact with popular Clone Wars characters like Anakin Skywalker, Mace Windu, Yoda, and Obi-Wan Kenobi and play more than 20 different mini-games, including Lightsaber Duel, Republic Defender, a tower defense game, and Speeder Bike Racing. Other mini-games were campaign-based on Seasons 3, 4, and 5 from The Clone Wars. Players can challenge each other in multi-player games to win Credits. Even though the game was based on the Jedi Temple, players could travel to different planets like Ryloth, Umbara, and Carlac when going to the hangar bay. Players could also interact with other players using the world chat, which allowed communication and chatting to a certain distance, or private chat, which allowed players to run a conversation with only one other person. Players were also given a buddy list to add and chat with friends and an ignore list to block all communications and requests from that particular player. Additionally, Members could even create player guilds (squads) to allow maximum interaction with friends and access to a private chat room. All players were given options to play games, build on their own lots, participate in events, and much more. The environment of the game is constantly changing, with weekly updates adding content to the game for players to experience for themselves.

== Gameplay ==
Clone Wars Adventures offered a huge selection of mini-games including strategy, action, puzzle, racing, and combat games. Mini-games were initially any player's main source of income — Republic Credits. However mini-games also offered challenges and goals for players. There were 30+ mini-games for players to play. Non-members were given partial access to a minority of the games, while paying Members were rewarded with total access and the full experience to each mission. Most mini-games had their own trophies that came along with completing a challenging feat in that certain mini-game. Select mini-games had their own title that were associated with it like Jedi General for Republic Defender or Jedi Ace for Starfighter. Another game is Lightsaber Duel. Titles for that included: Blademaster, Duelist, and Sentinel.

Players could engage in battles with droids, Umbarans, Death Watch troopers, and infamous characters like Darth Maul in combat zones. The game offered two combat zones, Umbara and Carlac which contained active quests, missions. Players could explore these worlds by foot or vehicle and face dangerous enemies. Typically, all AI enemies dropped two Republic Credits that players could use to purchase a wide variety of items, and leftover scrap items. Using the player combat system, a diverse system of fighting for both AIs and players alike, both members and non-members could unleash powerful attacks upon their opponents who usually dropped a special piece of material used to craft various items or complete collections. Players were given access to abilities that depended on the current weapon the player was using, power-ups with companions, and field equipment to aid them in combat.

Players could purchase droid companions like R2-D2 or TO-DO to follow them around in game. There were also special attachments that allow pets to do new things, like a boombox to make other players dance, or mounted guns to fire lasers when clicked on. Players could also unlock more droids like C-3PO by entering special game codes on the Clone Wars Adventures website home page. Other companions included adopted creatures such as Jawas. There were several Creature Pets available such as the Convor, a bird-like creature, with helmet attachments available for purchase. Other creatures included an Anooba, Kowakian monkey-lizard, a brown rancor, and a red rancor, which could only be obtained by receiving the pet in a special crate and purchasing an SC Code to open it. In addition to the entertainment of owning a companion, players were also given special abilities associated with their current pet. These power-ups provided boosts like speed and extra-damage while both on and off the battlefield.

Battle Classes were introduced to players in the September 28, 2012, update. The system allows a more achievable set of goals and rewards upon defeating enemies in combat zones. Players were given four primary battle classes, Jedi, Trooper, Sith, and Mercenary to rank up in and obtain exclusive rewards. The Trooper class was both set as a default for all players and free, while sinister classes, Sith and Mercenary, required a Station Cash purchase of 750 SC to experience. Unlike the other battle classes, Jedi was only accessible through a paid membership without any additional purchase. Additionally, paying members were given a 50% discount on the Sith and Mercenary classes alike. All battle classes required experience points to allow players to rank up in. Experience points were dropped by defeated enemies in combat zones and mini-games. Ranks gradually became more difficult as the player progressed through that particular class. Along with ranking up, players were given a whole new set of titles corresponding to rank as well as several pieces of wearable gear. Specialty Classes, alongside battle classes, differed in several ways, including the fact that they did not require combat zones to progress in. Specialty classes were passive player classes used within certain mini-games and were ranked up via certain activities. For example, the Scoundrel class incorporated Card Assault, a card based mini-game, with this specialty class. Upon the completion of campaign missions, the player rose through the ranks and was rewarded a special deck of cards.

=== Economy and social ===
Clone Wars Adventures used two forms of currency: Standard "Republic Credits" and "Station Cash". Republic Credits allowed players to purchase items or companions throughout the game. These were obtained through various activities ingame, whereas "Station Cash" was a premium currency that could be obtained through microtransactions, allowing players to purchase access to otherwise exclusive in-game items and challenges. It was free to download and play, but free players had restricted access to mini-games, equipment, furniture, and game areas. For a monthly subscription fee, members had full access to game content, excluding any premium items that must be purchased separately with station cash, such as original costumes or exclusive actions and housing items. Members were given access to VIP areas, more Mini-Games, the ability to wield dual-lightsabers, member-only items, the exclusive Jedi battle class, and a special deluxe house. Members were also allowed access to more mini-games, furniture, and extra game content.

All events current to date was displayed in the Event Calendar. The Event Calendar could be accessed via the "Play Games" button. Official SOE employees could be observed many times hosting events in Clone Wars Adventures, which all players were welcome to attend. Such events were referred to as "Emissary Events" in reference to its host, Emissary Event, the lead emissary represented as a player but with a pink-colored player name. Events included Speeder Bike Racing, Lightsaber Dueling, House Inspections, Trivia Events, and many more. Players had the chance to even obtain prizes from participating in these events, including DO-T, a blue protocol droid. Players were always welcome to attend Emissary Events, as displayed in the Event Calendar. Apart from Emissary Events, Daily Tournaments challenged players to a specific mission in mini-games, including Attack Cruiser, Republic Defender, and Starfighter. Upon reaching a high score, players were measured in the top 100 list according to the time they played and the score they received. All players within the top 100 leaderboards received a special bundle of prizes and Credits.

All players were given their own personal house in game. Free players were provided a Felucian Starter Lot, while members were given the larger and more customizable Jedi Living Quarters in addition to the lot. Originally, players were given a free Padawan Dormitory. Add-on rooms like the Droid Destruction Chamber and the Hidden Armory could be purchased with Station Cash. Additional player houses could be purchased with Station Cash as well, like the Attack Cruiser house that gave the player access to their own Republic battleship, and a Mustafar Lot which allowed players to customize their house on a volcano surrounded by rivers of lava. Each of these houses had its own set of furniture appropriate for its environment, such as Cruiser sets and Mustafar furniture. A huge selection of lots were available at the In-Game Store for Station Cash, while others were only obtainable through specific activities or mini-games, like the Tatooine lot.

Players could customize their houses with furniture and other decorations. Non-Members were allowed one set of housing items based on lower city furniture, while Jedi members were given access to purchase over 30 different sets of furniture including regular furniture, turrets, and building materials using game Credits or Station Cash. Players were still allowed access to these even when their membership ends, but only if they still had them in their furniture storage. Station Cash furniture sets included Gungan furniture, Mon Calamari aquatic furniture, and alien guests. Some items could even perform actions when clicked upon, like disco balls and turrets. Sony allowed players to buy promotional items like tree lights, face masks, and sparklers on special Holidays such as Valentine's Day and Christmas (known in Star Wars as "Life Day"). Players could invite their friends over to their houses for parties, gatherings, etc. A house rating system allowed players to give the player's house a rating from 1-5 stars. Players could submit their houses for rating and even name their own lots, but they were not permitted to edit the house until it as removed from the housing directory.

Clone Wars Adventures allowed Jedi Members to create player guilds (squads) as a way to chat with a large group of people, set up an organization, or just to get to know other players. Special squads, including ones that were created by Emissaries or CWA Counselors, were strictly off-limits to any player. Players could also create squads that focused only of specific people groups, like Clone Troopers, Jedi, Sith, Bounty Hunters, etc. When creating a squad, the player was being required to name the squad and submit it for approval by a Moderator. A notice was sent to the squad create when their squad had been created so they could recruit players. All squads had a limit of 100 members and were each given their own private chat that was only visible to squad members. Upon recruiting players to the squad, the leader or leaders had the option to promote members. Only Jedi Members could be promoted; Padawans could not. The player was given the choice on how high to promote the member. They were also given the ability to demote any member.

== Development ==
Clone Wars Adventures was developed and published by Sony Online Entertainment, the developers of well received massively multiplayer online role playing video gameFree Realms. It was announced at E3 2010, and it was based on the animated television series Star Wars: The Clone Wars. When the Clone Wars Adventures original concept was created, it was planned to be Star Wars's third MMO and would provide a way, aside from the television series, to spark interest in Star Wars: The Clone Wars. During the pre-development stages of the game licensing was worked out with Lucasfilm in order for SOE to attain rights for the game. The contract extended SOE exclusive rights to have access to all of the sound used in the series as well as access to artwork from the series (though it may have had to be re-modeled in order to be compatible with the game's engine, ForgeLight), inclusion of the games story-line as Star Wars canon, and access to all the episodes time in advance.

In order to be more engaging to the series viewers, the designers spent countless time creating the game to fit in well with the storyline. This led the designers to create games that were in line with the show, such as Lightsaber Dueling, and Starfighter. Also, many of the levels brought up in the mini-games expanded upon many of the episodes, and even introduced brand-new storylines, to fit in with the series. Another large effort on the game's creation was to create an art-style that gave the look and the feel of Star Wars: The Clone Wars. Also, parts of the game were created for marketing material, such as SOE's collaboration on the original Ryloth campaign for the game and the gungan lightsaber, which promoted Hasbro's Join the Jedi marketing campaign. SOE even had two of their Flash mini-games featured on Starwars.com, one of the two not being the original mini-game but using a base template from the game "Rocket Rescue". The game was based on SOE's internal ForgeLight game engine, and it was coded in C++ like all other SOE games. The game's artificial intelligence (AI) was created and developed in Autodesk Kyanpse. Much of the game also used many of RAD Game Tools products, including Granny 3-D, Bink Video, and the Miles Sound System. Autodesk's Scaleform was also used for the games Graphical User Interface (GUI). Also, the game's Speeder Bike Racing and Attack Cruiser were developed by Big Bang Entertainment LLC, a third-party company who had also developed some mini-games for Free Realms. Lucasfilm themselves also helped with the audio production, publishing, and management of the game.

Clone Wars Adventures was given an ESRB rating of Everyone 10+ for crude humor and fantasy violence. The game was also given an ESRB Kid's Privacy Certification to further ensure safety for children playing Clone Wars Adventures. The game was designed with young fans of the television show in mind. In an effort to support online safety for children, strict filters only allowed pre-approved words to be shown in chat, restricting the ability of a player to communicate personal information to others in game or to use bad language. The chat filter also blocked out numbers or numerals to prevent the use of further personal information or private codes.

== Reception ==
Clone Wars Adventures received mixed reviews from critics. Metacritic gave the game an aggregate score of 65 based on 4 reviews. GameZebo gave it a score of 3.5/5, stating that it contained "Incredible variety of mini-games", and praised its presentation, commenting that it "...matches the look and feel of Clone Wars series [sic] perfectly". They further criticized it because "Too much content is locked away." Avault awarded Clone Wars Adventures 4 out of 5 stars, emphasizing that "It doesn't matter whether you're a Star Wars fan or not. This free-to-play browser-based game is worth a look..."
