= Daybreak Game Company =

American video game developer

Daybreak Game Company LLC
- Formerly: Sony Online Entertainment (1997–2015)
- Type: Subsidiary
- Industry: Video games
- Founded: December 17, 1997; 28 years ago
- Headquarters: San Diego, California, U.S.
- Key people: Jason Epstein (chair); Ji Ham (CEO)
- Products: Massively multiplayer online games
- Number of employees: 307 (2024)
- Parent: Sony Computer Entertainment; (1997–2015); Sony Pictures Digital; (2006–2008); Inception Acquisitions; (2015–2020); Enad Global 7; (2020–present)
- Subsidiaries: Darkpaw Games; Dimensional Ink Games; Cold Iron Studios; Rogue Planet Games; Singularity 6
- Website: daybreakgames.com

Daybreak Game Company LLC is an American video game developer and publisher based in San Diego. The company was founded in December 1997 as Sony Online Entertainment (a subsidiary of Sony Computer Entertainment) but was spun off to an independent investor in February 2015 and renamed Daybreak Game Company. On December 1, 2020, Daybreak Game Company entered into an agreement to be acquired by Enad Global 7.

They are known for owning, maintaining, and creating additional content for the games EverQuest, EverQuest II, The Matrix Online, PlanetSide, Star Wars Galaxies, Clone Wars Adventures, Free Realms, Vanguard: Saga of Heroes, DC Universe Online, PlanetSide 2, H1Z1: Just Survive, and H1Z1: King of the Kill, along with more recent acquisitions Dungeons & Dragons Online, Magic: The Gathering Online, The Lord of the Rings Online, and Palia.

== History ==
=== Sony Online Entertainment Inc. (1997–2005) ===
Former Sony Online Entertainment logo

Sony Online Entertainment began with Sony Interactive Studios America (SISA), an internal game development studio of Sony, formed in 1995. In 1996, John Smedley was put in charge of SISA's development of an online role-playing video game. The game would evolve into the MMORPG EverQuest. Smedley hired programmers Brad McQuaid and Steve Clover, who had come to Smedley's attention through their work on the single-player role-playing game Warwizard.

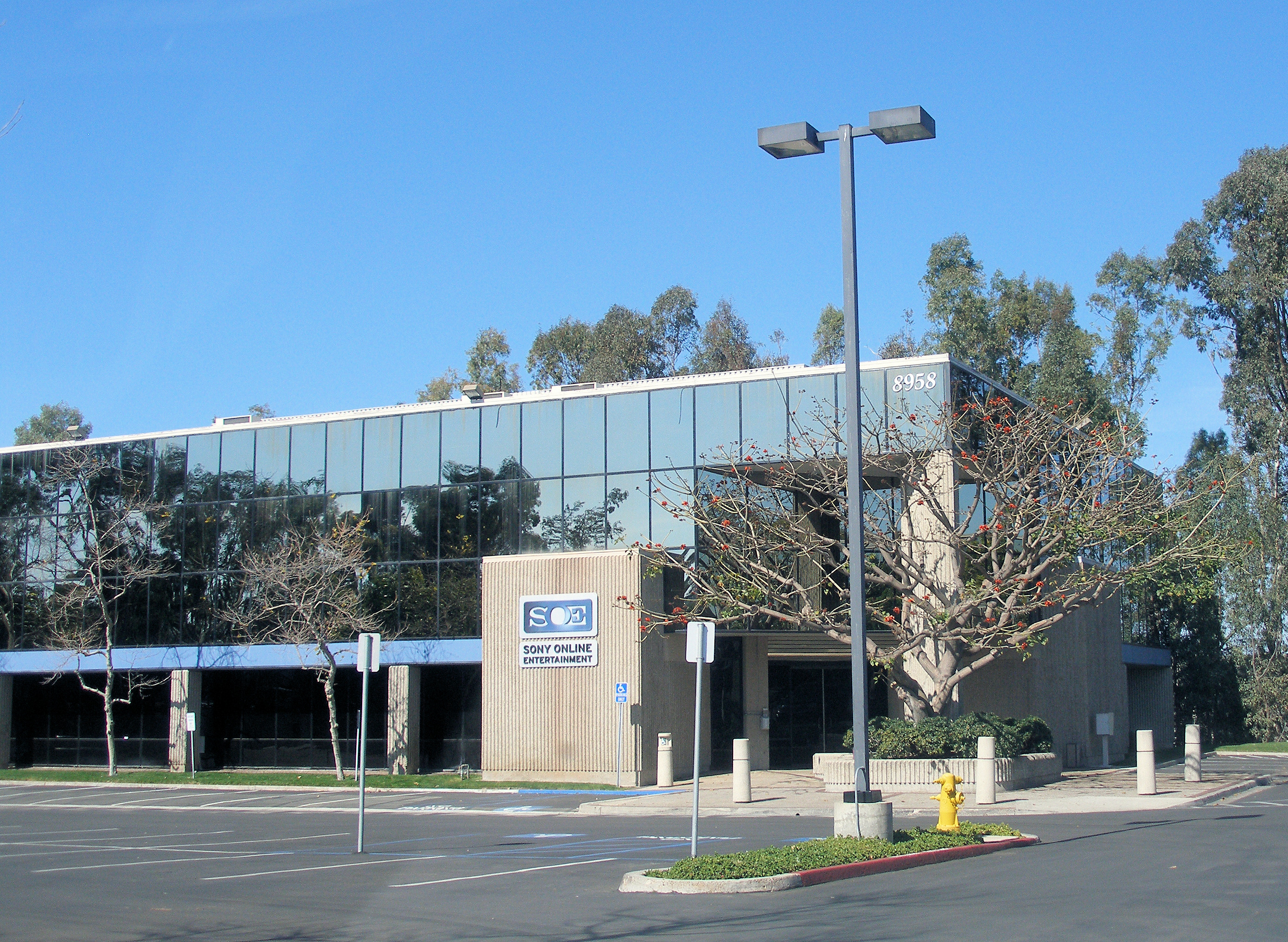
Former Sony Online Entertainment headquarters in San Diego

In April 1998, Sony Online Entertainment (SOE) was formed by merging parts of Sony Online Ventures with Sony Pictures Entertainment. Within a matter of months after this change, Sony Interactive Studios America was renamed 989 Studios. Towards the end of 1998, 989 Studios shifted its strategy to making PlayStation games. The company's video game and online development branch spun off; John Smedley, Brad McQuaid and Russell Shanks, as well as 55 other ex-989 employees, founded RedEye Interactive, later renamed Verant Interactive.

Verant Interactive launched EverQuest on March 16, 1999, through Sony with modest expectations. The game became successful. Sales continued rising at a steady rate until mid-2001 when growth slowed. As of 2004, Sony reported subscription numbers close to 450,000. In March 2000, Verant released EverQuest: The Ruins of Kunark, the first in a long list of expansion packs for EverQuest.

In April 2000, Verant hired former Ultima Online developers Raph Koster and Rich Vogel. They formed an office in Austin, Texas, to develop Star Wars Galaxies for LucasArts. SOE acquired Verant in June 2000 and eventually promoted Brad McQuaid to be its Chief Creative Officer. In October 2001, McQuaid resigned and founded Sigil Games Online, drawing many of the original developers of EverQuest from SOE.

Developed by Sony Online Entertainment, LucasArts released Star Wars Galaxies in 2003, which saw rapid growth, as expected. Bruce Woodcock estimates that Star Wars Galaxies reached nearly 300,000 subscribers within the year, before trailing off. LucasArts has released three expansions for Star Wars Galaxies, Jump to Lightspeed in October 2004, Rage of the Wookiees in May 2005, and Trials Of Obi-Wan in November 2005.

In 2003, the company also explored relatively untouched MMOG territory with the massively multiplayer online first-person shooter PlanetSide and the PlayStation 2 MMORPG EverQuest Online Adventures. PlanetSide enjoyed a reasonably successful launch, however it never attracted wide popularity. SOE released two expansions for PlanetSide, a retail product titled Core Combat, and Aftershock, a free expansion. EverQuest Online Adventures was not as successful, but it spawned an expansion, EverQuest Online Adventures Frontiers. The game was shut down on March 29, 2012, after nine years of operation.

EverQuest II was released on November 9, 2004. The sequel was set hundreds of years after the original. Similar in strategy to EverQuest, SOE has released several adventure packs and expansion packs for EverQuest II, starting with The Bloodline Chronicles in March 2005.

In January 2005, Sony Online Entertainment announced the creation of Station Publishing, a new label for distributing titles made by external developers. It was renamed Platform Publishing some time later, publishing titles such as Frantix and GripShift. In November 2005, SOE added the New Game Enhancements to Star Wars Galaxies, changing many of the game's core mechanics. This upset players and critics, with the level of concurrent players reduced to around 10,000; relatively few for the MMO industry.

SOE has produced numerous EverQuest expansions and spin-off video games, including Champions of Norrath (for PlayStation 2) and Lords of EverQuest (Windows). They published Champions: Return to Arms, the sequel to Champions of Norrath, in February 2005. In August 2005, SOE entered a deal with Warner Bros. Entertainment which saw the acquisition and transition of The Matrix Online to the existing line up of SOE games.

=== Sony Online Entertainment LLC (2006–2015) ===
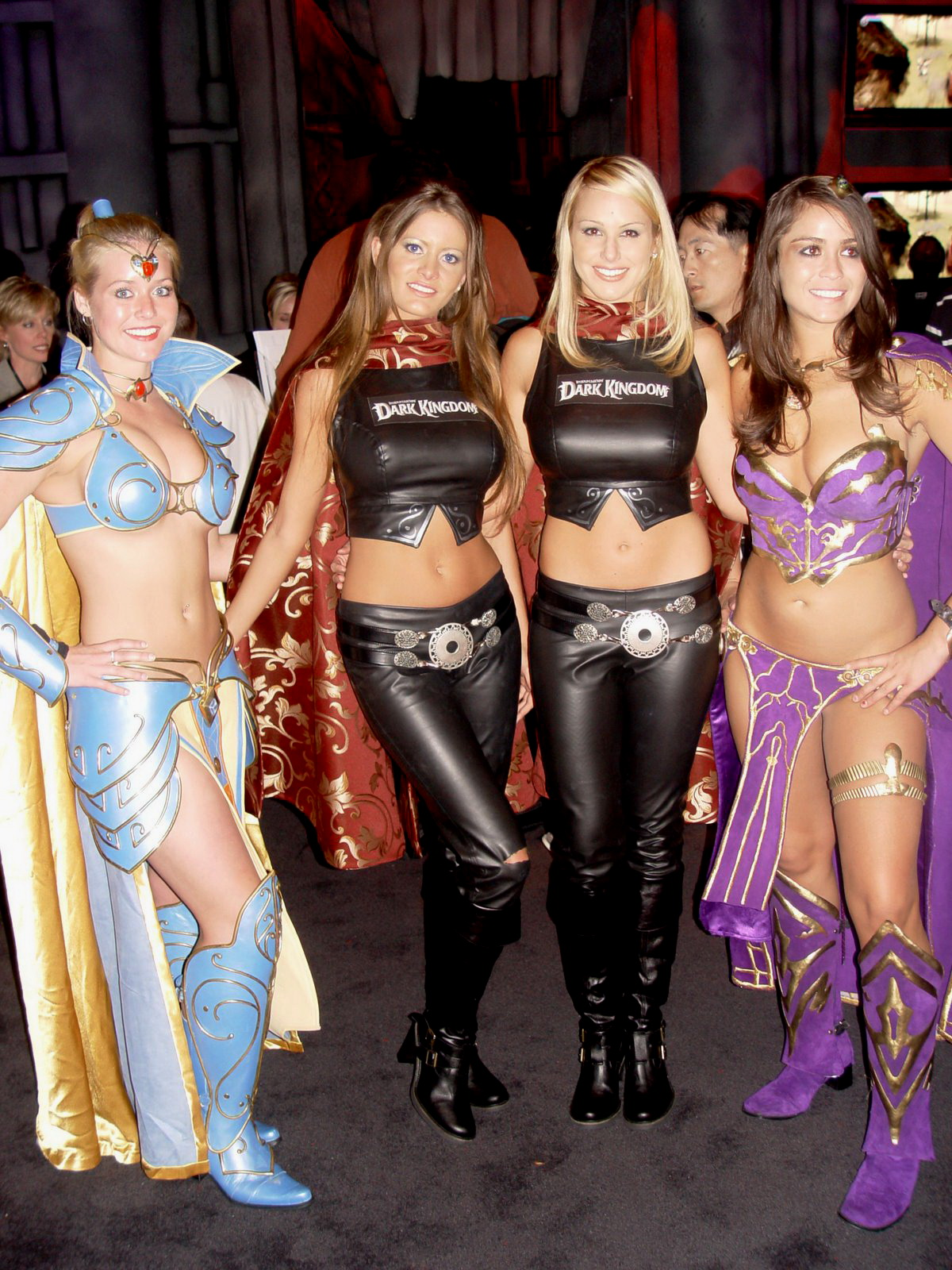
Promotion of EverQuest II and Untold Legends: Dark Kingdom at the E3 2006

In April 2006, Sony Online Entertainment, Inc. became Sony Online Entertainment LLC, owned by Sony Pictures Digital and Sony Computer Entertainment America. In May 2006, it was announced that SOE would be co-publisher of Vanguard: Saga of Heroes. However, Sigil retained full development rights, and SOE's role was only that of marketing, distribution, technical support, and hosting the game servers. SOE also announced the release of Field Commander, its third game for the PlayStation Portable System. In August 2006, SOE announced the acquisition of developer Worlds Apart Productions, renaming the studio SOE-Denver. The studio has since released an online version of the WizKids pirates constructible strategy game. In November 2006, SOE released its first PlayStation 3 title Untold Legends: Dark Kingdom, within the launch window of the PlayStation 3 system. SOE also released Pirates Online Constructible Strategy Game, the online version of the WizKids Pirates Constructible Strategy Game.

In January 2007, SOE announced that it has licensed rights from Midway Home Entertainment to develop and release six classic Midway games for PlayStation 3 download, including Mortal Kombat II, Gauntlet II, Joust, Rampage World Tour, Rampart, and Championship Sprint. The games were available from the PlayStation Store. On May 15, 2007, Sony Online Entertainment announced that they had completed a transaction to purchase key assets from Sigil Games Online, including Vanguard: Saga of Heroes (described as Sigil's "tentpole property").

On March 13, 2008, Sony Online Entertainment announced that Sony Computer Entertainment will have direct control over SOE.

On January 16, 2009, the company joined Steam, selling EverQuest, EverQuest II and Vanguard: Saga of Heroes via Steam. On the same day, the company purchased Pox Nora, an online turn-based strategy game. On August 1, 2009, SOE shut down The Matrix Online after 4 years of operation. Players were treated to about 2 months of gaming despite some initial setbacks that left many veteran players unable to access the game for about a week after the announcement was made. A memory book was developed and was made available for download on the game's site.

As of May 2010, John Smedley was the CEO of Sony Online Entertainment. SOE is headquartered in San Diego, California, with additional game development studios located in Austin, Texas, Denver, Colorado and Seattle, Washington. On July 15, 2010, SOE eliminated 35 full-time positions and an undisclosed number of temporary positions to "...better align the company's resources..." On August 8, 2010, SOE announced that EverQuest Next was in the early stages of development.

On January 7, 2011, SOE and Fastpoint Games announced the alpha launch of the Facebook game Fortune League. Fortune League integrates real-time performance data such as damages, deaths and healings directly from the massively multiplayer online game environment and uses them to form "Hero Stats" that drive the game. Therefore, player actions inside EverQuest II affected what happened in Fortune League, and prizes from Fortune League helped users advance in the EverQuest II environment. Fastpoint Games CEO, Kelly Perdew, positioned Fortune League as a new category of "snackable" data-driven games that would help MMO franchises acquire users and tap new revenue streams. On February 1, 2011, SOE unveiled new PlayStation Network games to be released throughout the year. These included Acceleration of Suguri X Edition, Akimi Village, Plants vs. Zombies, Rochard, Sideway and Slam Bolt Scrappers. On March 31, 2011, SOE confirmed that "it will eliminate 205 positions and close its Denver, Seattle, and Tucson studios." Production of The Agency was also discontinued.

On December 6, 2011, EverQuest II switched to a free-to-play model, with optional subscriptions. On December 15, 2011, Star Wars Galaxies was closed. SOE maintained a Memory Book for former players.

==== Data breach ====
On April 27, 2011, Sony, the parent company of SOE, released statements regarding an intrusion, on or about April 18, into the PlayStation Network, and the potential theft of up to 77 million subscribers' personal data. Sony maintains that PSN and SOE are hosted and run on completely separate subsystems and that the PlayStation Network intrusion had no major effect on SOE's online services. SOE developers posted messages of concern and apology, but also assurances the SOE servers and systems were not compromised.

On May 2, 2011, SOE interrupted their online services. Players were told "We have had to take the SOE service down temporarily. In the course of our investigation into the intrusion into our systems, we have discovered an issue that warrants enough concern for us to take the service down effective immediately. We will provide an update later today (Monday)." Later, SOE disclosed that "personal information from approximately 24.6 million SOE accounts may have been stolen", including names, addresses, telephone numbers, email addresses, gender, date of birth, login ID, and hashed passwords.

=== Daybreak Game Company (2015–present) ===
On February 2, 2015, Sony announced that SOE had been sold to investment company Columbus Nova for an undisclosed amount and that it would be renamed Daybreak Game Company. Cutting its ties with Sony, Daybreak subsequently became able to develop their games for platforms other than PlayStation, including Xbox and mobile platforms. On February 11, employees of the company reported they were undergoing layoffs, including several senior developers and project managers. Shortly after, Daybreak responded by announcing the layoffs were intended to make the company profitable but did not detail the extent of the layoffs or whether it would affect the development and support of their new and existing games. On July 22, 2015, Daybreak announced that John Smedley had stepped down as the company's president, and that Russell Shanks, the company's former COO, will take up his position. On August 21, 2015, Smedley left Daybreak to found a new company. In October 2016, Russell Shanks left Daybreak.

On December 19, 2016, it was announced that Daybreak games would become the new publisher of The Lord of the Rings Online and Dungeons & Dragons Online, taking over the role from Warner Bros. Interactive Entertainment. However, the two games would maintain their old account system and server centers, not integrating with the rest of Daybreak. The result of this deal would cause the closure of Asheron's Call and Asheron's Call 2: Fallen Kings on January 31, 2017.

In April 2018, Viktor Vekselberg, a Russian businessman and owner of portfolio company Renova Group, was sanctioned by the United States Department of the Treasury as part of an investigation on Russian interference in the 2016 United States elections. Columbus Nova had previously identified itself as an affiliate of Renova Group, while Renova Group had listed Columbus Nova as part of its corporate structure. Subsequently, it was believed that Columbus Nova, and consequently Daybreak, had also been affected by these sanctions. Daybreak subsequently began to deny that it had been sold to Columbus Nova, stating that the company had actually been acquired by Jason Epstein through his company Inception Acquisitions, LLC instead. At the time of the acquisition, Epstein had been a partner to Columbus Nova, though he left that company in 2017. A Daybreak spokesperson claimed that Epstein's exact ties to Columbus Nova had caused confusion in media reporting of the sale, even though its deleted press release made the same claim. Columbus Nova also stated that it had never been owned by Renova Group, though Renova Group had been their largest client.

In September 2018, holding company NantWorks announced its strategic investment in Daybreak, and the resulting new venture in which the company will bring popular Daybreak games (including EverQuest and H1Z1) to mobile platforms. Three rounds of layoffs occurred between April 2018 and October 2019; the December rounds was estimated to have affected around 70 people. These layoffs were towards "a realignment of the company into separate franchise teams, which will allow us to highlight their expertise, better showcase the games they work on, and ultimately provide tailored experiences for our players."

Following from the October 2019 round of layoffs, Daybreak announced in January 2020 that it would reorganize its internal structure to form three divisions: Dimensional Ink Games, Darkpaw Games, and Rogue Planet Games. Dimensional Ink became responsible for ongoing maintenance of DC Universe Online while working on a new MMO, Darkpaw to focus on the EverQuest franchise, and Rogue Planet to focus on PlanetSide 2.

In August 2020, it was announced that Daybreak would acquire Cold Iron Studios which was developing a PC and console game set in the Alien universe at the time. However, the deal never went through and the subsequent purchase of Daybreak by Enad Global 7 did not include Cold Iron Studios.

On December 1, 2020, it was reported that Daybreak Game Company would be acquired by Enad Global 7 for $300 million. The transaction was completed on December 22.

In December 2021, it was reported that Daybreak Game Company would be taking over development of Magic: The Gathering Online in 2022. The transition to Daybreak Games servers was completed on October 18, 2022.

In February 2024, "less than 15" employees were laid off from teams supporting Everquest, Dungeons & Dragons Online, DC Universe Online, and Lord of the Rings Online.

On July 1, 2024, Daybreak Game Company announced its acquisition of Palia developer Singularity 6.

== Station.com ==
Sony Online Entertainment's Station.com was a portal to its PC, console, casual and mobile games. Players could access and download games such as EverQuest, EverQuest II and PlanetSide. Station.com also provided sneak previews to new games for Sony PlayStation 2, PlayStation 3 and PlayStation Portable, including Untold Legends: Dark Kingdom. November 2006. In August 2006, Station.com added several games by Sony Pictures Digital Entertainment.

== ForgeLight engine ==
The ForgeLight engine is a game engine developed by the company, and used for Free Realms, Clone Wars Adventures, PlanetSide 2, Landmark, EverQuest Next, Just Survive, and H1Z1. The engine is able to support up to 2,000 players on a single game server and allows over 200 players to be rendered by a game client at once.

== Games ==
Title	Release date	Platform(s)	Status	Notes
Tanarus	November 30, 1997	Windows	Closed 2010-06-10	
EverQuest	March 16, 1999	Windows	Active	Co-developed with 989 Studios
Infantry	October 1999	Windows	Closed 2012-03-29	Developed by Harmless eGames LLC
Cosmic Rift	April 17, 2001	Windows	Closed 2012-03-29	Developed by Jeff Petersen
EverQuest Online Adventures	February 11, 2003	PlayStation 2	Closed 2012-03-29	
PlanetSide	May 20, 2003	Windows	Closed 2016-07-01	
Star Wars Galaxies	June 26, 2003	Windows	Closed 2011-12-15	Published by LucasArts. Closed after licensing with LucasArts ceased.
EverQuest Online Adventures: Frontiers	November 17, 2003	PlayStation 2	Closed 2012-03-29	
Star Chamber: The Harbinger Saga	November 2003	Windows	Closed 2012-03-29	Developed by Nayantara Studios
Lords of EverQuest	December 12, 2003	Windows	—N/a	Developed by Rapid Eye Entertainment
Champions of Norrath	February 10, 2004	PlayStation 2	—N/a	Developed by Snowblind Studios
EverQuest II	November 8, 2004	Windows	Active	
Champions: Return to Arms	February 7, 2005	PlayStation 2	—N/a	Developed by Snowblind Studios
Untold Legends: Brotherhood of the Blade	March 22, 2005	PSP	—N/a	
The Matrix Online	August 9, 2005	Windows	Closed 2009-07-31	Originally released on March 22, 2005 by Monolith Productions. Acquired by SOE on August 9, 2005.
Untold Legends: The Warrior's Code	March 28, 2006	PSP	—N/a	
Field Commander	May 23, 2006	PSP	—N/a	
PoxNora	August 1, 2006	Windows	Closed 2014-03-06	Co-developed by Octopi Media Design Lab and Desert Owl Games. Now run by Desert Owl Games.
Cash Guns Chaos	November 17, 2006	PlayStation 3	—N/a	
Untold Legends: Dark Kingdom	November 19, 2006	PlayStation 3	—N/a	
Vanguard: Saga of Heroes	January 30, 2007	Windows	Closed 2014-07-31	Co-Published with Sigil Games
Legends of Norrath	May 9, 2007	Windows	Closed 2016-08-17	
God of War: Betrayal	June 20, 2007	Java Platform, Micro Edition	—N/a	Co-developed with Javaground and published by Sony Pictures Digital
Pirates of the Burning Sea	January 22, 2008	Windows	Active	Originally developed by Flying Lab Software. Now run by Portalus.
Jeopardy!	September 11, 2008	PlayStation 3	—N/a	
Bejeweled 2	January 29, 2009	PlayStation 3, PSP	—N/a	Handled the port with PopCap Games. Released June 28, 2010 for PSP.
Zuma	February 19, 2009	PlayStation 3, PSP	—N/a	Handled the port with PopCap Games; rereleased in 2012 by Electronic Arts. Released August 24, 2010 for PSP.
Wheel of Fortune	March 19, 2009	PlayStation 3	—N/a	
Free Realms	April 28, 2009	Windows, PlayStation 3	Closed 2014-03-31	Released March 29, 2011 for PS3
Heavy Weapon	June 11, 2009	PlayStation 3	Active	Handled the port with PopCap Games
Peggle and Peggle Nights	November 19, 2009	PlayStation 3, PSP	Active	Handled the port with PopCap Games. Released November 16, 2010 for PSP.
Feeding Frenzy 2: Shipwreck Showdown	March 11, 2010	PlayStation 3	—N/a	Handled the port with PopCap Games; rereleased in 2012 by Electronic Arts.
Groovin' Blocks	March 18, 2010	PlayStation 3, PSP	—N/a	Handled the port with Empty Clip Studios. Released July 13, 2010 for PSP.
Star Wars: Clone Wars Adventures	September 15, 2010	Windows	Closed 2014-03-31	
Fortune League	January 7, 2011	Facebook	Closed 2011-07-11	Developed with Fastpoint Games
DC Universe Online	January 11, 2011	Windows, PlayStation 3 (discontinued), PlayStation 4, Xbox One, Nintendo Switch	Active	Developed by Dimensional Ink Games
Magic: The Gathering – Tactics	January 18, 2011	Windows, PlayStation 3	Closed 2014-03-28	
Plants vs. Zombies	February 8, 2011	PlayStation 3, PlayStation Vita	—N/a	Handled the port with PopCap Games. Released February 21, 2012 for PS Vita.
Payday: The Heist	October 4, 2011	Windows, PlayStation 3	—N/a	Developed with Overkill Software
Bullet Run	July 31, 2012	Windows	Closed 2013-03-08	Developed by ACONY
PlanetSide 2	November 20, 2012	Windows, PlayStation 4	Active	Development had been paused to work on Planetside Arena. With Arena's cancellation, PS2 has returned to active development with the "Escalation" update on March 11, 2020.
Dragon's Prophet	September 23, 2013	Windows	Closed 2015-11-16	Developed by Runewaker Entertainment
Just Survive	January 15, 2015 (early access)	Windows	Closed 2018-10-24	Was formerly the original game concept sold in early access, known simply as H1Z1, until it was split into two separate projects in February 2016. Was renamed as Just Survive in October 2017. Closed in October 2018.
Landmark	June 10, 2016	Windows	Closed 2017-02-21	Was in parallel development with EverQuest Next
Z1 Battle Royale	February 28, 2018	Windows, PlayStation 4	Active	Formerly known as King of the Kill and H1Z1.
EverQuest Next	Canceled	Windows, PlayStation 4	Canceled	Canceled on March 11, 2016
PlanetSide Arena	Canceled	Windows, PlayStation 4, Xbox One	Canceled	Canceled on December 13, 2019, with servers shut down on January 10, 2020.
