= RotoHog =

- RotoHog.com homepage (March 2008)
- Website type: Fantasy sport
- Owners: Sports Composite DE, Inc.
- Website: rotohog.com at the Wayback Machine (archived 2 February 2007)
- Commercial: Yes
- Registration: Required to play
- Launched: 2007

RotoHog was the consumer facing fantasy sports website for Fastpoint Games, a digital platform developer that designed, implemented and marketed fantasy services for media and advertising partners. The company developed and managed fantasy sports games for media companies, sports brands, and professional sports leagues, which were often co-branded.

Their signature game was a fantasy draft game with a stock market-style trading floor for baseball, basketball, American football, and Association Football (soccer). The company also offered traditional commissioner and pick-em style fantasy sports games.

RotoHog also branched out to entertainment games with the Rose Ceremony game for the reality TV show The Bachelor and the Us Weekly Celebrity Fantasy League.

== Fantasy Game Platform ==
RotoHog was also the provider of nba.com's NBA Stock Exchange and commissioner games and Brazilian media company Grupo RBS's first ever Fantasy Soccer game. In 2009, RotoHog began to provide games for Fox Sports en Español and the AVP Pro Beach Volleyball tour.

In June 2009, RotoHog closed a multi-year deal with Sporting News to power the sports media company's suite of fantasy sports games. In March 2010, RotoHog began powering the MySpace Bracket Challenge for the NCAA college basketball tournament. At the same time, the company announced that it would be launching its first commissioner-style baseball game on its own site.

Trading Floor

Buy Order

Like most fantasy sports games, the core elements of RotoHog's flagship stock exchange game involved building a team and setting a line-up to earn points. To this traditional core game, RotoHog added a liquid market for players that all team managers use to trade players. Players could be traded at almost any time and player prices reflected up-to-the minute supply and demand.

RotoHog differed from fantasy sports stock simulations in that the goal of the game was to score the most fantasy points by fielding the best team of players. Stock simulation games focus on increasing the value of a player's portfolio by anticipating price movements of players.

RotoHog also provided a social networking platform that allowed users to compete in unlimited size leagues grouped by location, team allegiance, or company affiliations in addition to smaller private leagues. An example of a large group of connected individuals using the site was the non-profit group Hire-a-Hero, which used RotoHog as a way to help military veterans connect with each other and transition back to civilian life.

=== Prizes ===
RotoHog has awarded various prizes include cash to the top teams in weekly, monthly and season long contests. The 2007 baseball and football champions won $100,000 each. The owner of the second place football team won $25,000, and third place $10,000. The remaining top 100 finishers also earned cash prizes.

== Company, financing and sponsorship ==
Sports Composite DE, Inc.
- Type: Private Venture Capital-backed
- Industry: Internet
- Founded: Delaware, U.S. (2006)
- Founder: David Wu & Kent Smetters
- Headquarters: Los Angeles, California, U.S.
- Area served: Worldwide
- Key people: Kelly Perdew, CEO
- Products: RotoHog.com, NBA Stock Exchange
- Services: Fantasy Sports Gaming Platform
- Website: www.rotohog.com

Sports Composite DE, Inc., the company that operated the RotoHog website, was founded by entrepreneur David Wu and Wharton Business School Professor Kent Smetters in 2006 and is based in Inglewood, California. Kelly Perdew, winner of season 2 of The Apprentice, was named CEO in May 2008.

The company raised $6 million in its first venture round in August 2007. This funding was raised via DFJ DragonFund China and Mission Ventures, with additional investment coming from Allen & Co. and SCP Worldwide. StubHub co-founder Jeff Fluhr also invested in the firm.

The company raised an additional $2 million in March 2009. The round was led by Mission Ventures and DFJ Dragon.

Sports Composite DE, Inc. earns revenues from advertising and optional statistical packages. RotoHog leagues and competitions have been sponsored by former American football player Marshall Faulk and former baseball players Fred Lynn, Wade Boggs, and Ozzie Smith.

In April 2009, RotoHog developed an exclusive partnership with RazorGator that allowed RotoHog users to purchase tickets to live events through the global ticket reseller.

=== Awards ===
RotoHog was the recipient of the following industry honors:

- 2009 Fantasy Sports Trade Association Baseball Stats Projection Accuracy Award
- 2009 Fantasy Sports Trade Association Football Stats Projection Accuracy Award
- 2009 AlwaysOn OnHollywood Top 100 Media and Entertainment Companies: Enabling Technology category Winner
- 2009 Tech Industry Awards: Entertainment & Gaming category finalist alongside Future Ads, and category winner Blizzard Entertainment, Inc.
