= Magic: The Gathering – Tactics =

2011 video game

- Developer: Sony Online Entertainment
- Series: Magic: The Gathering
- Platform: Windows
- Release: January 18, 2011
- Genre: Turn-based strategy

Magic: The Gathering – Tactics is an online turn-based strategy game developed by Sony Online Entertainment and based on the Magic: The Gathering trading card game series. The game was released in January 2011 for the PC, and on Steam in February 2012. A PlayStation 3 version of the game was canceled due to the game being shut down in March 2014.

== Overview ==
Magic: The Gathering – Tactics is a turn-based strategy game, in which the players had to defeat the opponent's Planeswalker. The players control a Planeswalker and an army in the form of spellbooks.

After creating an account, players had to choose one of five colors to focus on, as well as a figure to visually represent his or her Planeswalker. New accounts initially received starter decks for all of the colors, free of cost. Cards from these starter decks could not be traded. Additional cards were obtainable via trades in an auction house, purchases in a cash shop, or rewards for completion of single-player scenarios.

Gameplay differs from the card game in several ways. One difference is that there are no land cards to provide mana; instead, an incremental pool of mana is available to the player on each turn, depending on the cards in his or her spellbook. Another notable difference is that the player's Planeswalker is able to level up and specialize in talents. Also, battles progress on a grid-based map with figures representing creatures and Planeswalkers, each of which controlled and moved by the players, much like a miniature game or tactical RPG.

Gameplay is separated into a number of campaigns and while players can access some for free, additional content must be unlocked through the premium virtual currency used in all Sony Online Entertainment games, Station Cash.

A second set of figures was released in December 2011, increasing the number available to players. This set was originally scheduled to be released in summer along with some new game mechanics.
