= Landmark (video game) =

2016 video game

- Developer: Daybreak Game Company
- Publisher: Daybreak Game Company
- Composer: Jeremy Soule
- Engine: ForgeLight
- Platform: Microsoft Windows
- Release: June 10, 2016
- Genre: Massively multiplayer online role-playing game
- Mode: Multiplayer

Landmark was a massively multiplayer online role-playing game developed and published by Daybreak Game Company (originally Sony Online Entertainment) for Microsoft Windows. The game's original name was EverQuest Next Landmark, but was switched to Landmark in March 2014. The original purpose for EverQuest Next Landmark was mainly as a player content creation tool for EverQuest Next. Landmark was released in June 2016, and was playable until the servers were shut down in February 2017.

== Development ==
The original purpose for EverQuest Next Landmark was mainly as a player content creation tool for EverQuest Next. In April 2014, Dave Georgeson, director of development on the EverQuest series, told Polygon in the interview that "Sony Online [Daybreak] won't ever be finished making Landmark". In February 2015, Sony sold Sony Online Entertainment to the investment company Columbus Nova, who renamed it Daybreak Game Company. By that June, Daybreak Game Company shifted its focus of development from Landmark to EverQuest Next.

In March 2016, Daybreak Game Company president Russell Shanks announced that EverQuest Next was cancelled. Also an announcement on official Landmark forums was made by an executive producer of EverQuest and EverQuest II that Landmark would be launching in 2016. Several months after its release, Daybreak shut down the game's servers, as well as the accompanying forums and social media channels, on February 21, 2017.
