= Weplay =

Adult gaming platform app

Weplay was an American online community site for young athletes, their families, coaches, and teams involved in youth sports. Its customer base and assets were acquired in 2013 by TeamSnap.

== Site ==
Members could set up their profiles with pictures, exchange communication with friends on the network, upload videos of sports events, and play games. It also provided a team management application for parents and coaches. Other features included blogs, a media gallery of youth sports photos and videos, Q&As with fans, as well as self-created group profiles that let site members connect through shared interests. Professional athletes such as Derek Jeter, LeBron James, Peyton Manning and Jennie Finch had Weplay accounts.

In March 2009, Weplay launched its Skills and Drills library. By partnering with Adidas, The Amateur Softball Association, MLB, online drill providers, and professional athletes, Weplay had Skills and Drills libraries for softball, baseball and soccer including several hundred videos, 3D Simulations and documents broken down by skill level and skill type by sport.

The domain WePlay.com title is no longer directly associated with Weplay or Teamsnap online communities.

== Company ==
Weplay was headquartered in New York City with a west coast office located in Long Beach, California. Stephen Hansen (GeoCities, Universal) served as CEO. The company launched as a startup in late 2007 under the name ‘Made the Cut,’ and changed to Weplay at launch in March 2008. It was conceived as a joint venture between Creative Artists Agency, the venture capital arm of New York-based hedge fund Pequot Capital (now known as FirstMark Capital) and MLB Advanced Media, Internet arm of Major League Baseball. Weplay partnered with several national youth sports organizations, including Pop Warner (football), the Amateur Softball Association, the Positive Coaching Alliance and the National Association of State Games to make Weplay the official social network service provider and partner for some of these YSOs. Weplay raised another $8.6M in August 2008, with several professional athletes having a financial stake in the company. It acquired Fastpoint Games in 2012.

Its customer base, technology, and coaching assets were acquired in 2013 by TeamSnap for under 5 million dollars.
