= Untold Legends: Brotherhood of the Blade =

2005 video game

- Developer: Sony Online Entertainment
- Publisher: Sony Online Entertainment
- Platform: PlayStation Portable
- Release: 2005
- Genre: Action role-playing
- Modes: Single-player, multiplayer

Untold Legends: Brotherhood of the Blade is a launch title for the Sony PSP handheld video game system, developed by Sony Online Entertainment. It is a third person action role-playing game in which the player can complete various quests for money and items. Untold Legends can be played cooperatively with up to four other players via Ad Hoc.

The player can choose to be one of four characters (Knight, Druid, Berserker or Alchemist). The goal is to save Aven, a city so high in the mountains that it often appears to be floating in the clouds, from the attack of various creatures. This "floating city" is the last defense of humanity against a sudden onslaught of dark, foul creatures. It is up to the player to explore the world of Untaca and its various regions, searching for items, talking to people, and killing monsters.

== Plot ==
After emerging victorious from a tournament, the Guardian finds the city under attack by large Spiders. Pursuing through the sewers, the Guardian discovers that the benevolent ruler Kaylee and the Overseer Lysetta have been corrupted by praetox and a dark disease that twists their minds. After dealing with a series of threats and would-be usurpers, the Guardian is told that Kaylee has finally succumbed to the dark curse and is forced to kill her and the forces that started the series of attacks.

== Reception ==
Reception

Aggregate score
Aggregator	Score
Metacritic	68/100

Review scores
Publication	Score
Edge	7/10
Electronic Gaming Monthly	7.33/10
Eurogamer	3/10
Famitsu	28/40
Game Informer	7.75/10
GamePro	3.5/5
GameRevolution	C−
GameSpot	6.9/10
GameSpy	2.5/5
GameZone	7.9/10
IGN	7.6/10
Official U.S. PlayStation Magazine	3/5
Detroit Free Press	4/4

The game received "average" reviews according to video game review aggregator Metacritic. In Japan, Famitsu gave it a score of one eight, one six, and two sevens, for a total of 28 out of 40.

== See also ==
- Untold Legends: The Warrior's Code
- Untold Legends: Dark Kingdom
