= Kent Smetters =

American economist

- Education: Ohio State University, Harvard University
- Known for: Insurance, risk management, Social Security policy
- Scientific career
- Fields: Economics
- Workplaces: Wharton School

Kent Smetters is an academic, entrepreneur, and former government official.

== Early years ==
Smetters was raised in Ohio. He received his bachelor's degrees in economics and computer science from the Ohio State University in 1990, and master's and PhD degrees in economics from Harvard University in 1992 and 1995 respectively.

== Career ==
=== Academics ===
Smetters is a professor of insurance and risk management at the University of Pennsylvania's Wharton School and the Joseph E. and Ruth E. Boettner Professor of Financial Gerontology. Financial gerontology is the study of aging and related financial and business impacts, applying the functionality of gerontology to the concepts of financial planning. Smetters has written on government debt and Social Security policy and has a strong interest in financial planning, analyzing relationships between the economic well-being of the elderly and their social, legal, psychological, physical, and environmental well-being. Smetters has also written about the need for insurance industry reform and supports the notion that the private sector should provide terrorism insurance or protection instead of government. He has held visiting appointments with the Department of Economics at Stanford University. Smetters has also published several papers and chapters with the National Bureau of Economic Research, where he continues to be a research associate in public economics and faculty research fellow for the Aging Program. Since 2000, he has been with the Michigan Retirement Research Center as a research associate.

=== Government and policy ===
From 1995 to 1999, Smetters was an economist at the Congressional Budget Office. In 1999, he served as a consultant for the World Bank. He became deputy assistant secretary for economic policy of the United States Treasury in 2001, where he stayed on for another year as a consultant. He was also a member of the Blue Ribbon Advisory Panel on Dynamic Scoring, U.S. Congress from 2002 to 2003. He is a visiting scholar of the American Enterprise Institute for public policy research.

=== RotoHog ===
He co-founded Sports Composite DE, Inc. with David Wu in 2006, which developed the RotoHog fantasy sports game. RotoHog is a digital platform developer that designs, implements and markets fantasy services for media and advertising partners. The company builds, delivers and manages co-branded fantasy sports games for major media companies, sports companies and professional sports leagues.

RotoHog is also the provider of nba.com's NBA Stock Exchange and commissioner games. In 2009, RotoHog began to provide games for Fox Sports in Spanish and the AVP Pro Beach Volleyball tour. Smetters is no longer with the company but serves on the board of advisors.

=== Veritat Advisors, Inc ===
After several years in the financial industry, Smetters co-founded the company Veritat Advisors. Smetters is the president of Veritat Advisors.

== Awards and recognitions ==
=== Awards ===
- Fellowship, National Science Foundation, 1990–93;
- TIAA-CREF Paul A. Samuelson, Certificate of Excellence, 2002;
- Robert C. Witt Award for the best paper published in the Journal of Risk and Insurance, 2000

== Works ==
=== Publications ===
- Ricardian Equivalence: Long-Run Leviathan. (Journal of Public Economics 73: 395–421, 1999).
- Co-author of Privatizing Social Security in the U.S. — Comparing the Options. (Review of Economic Dynamics 2: 532–574, 1999).
- Co-author of Simulating Fundamental Tax Reform in the U.S. (American Economic Review 91.3: 574-595 June, 2001).
- The Dynamic Properties of the Neoclassical Growth Model with CES Production. (Review of Economic Dynamics 6,3: 697-707 2003).
- Co-author of Fiscal and Generational Imbalances: New Budget Measures for New Budget Priorities (American Enterprise Institute Press, 2003)
- Co-editor with Dr. Olivia Mitchell, of The Pension Challenge: Risk Transfers and Retirement Income Security (Oxford University Press, 2004). ISBN 978-0-19-926691-3
- Co-author of Opting Out of Social Security (Journal of Public Economics 88: 1295–1306, 2004).
- Co-author of Consumption Taxes, Risk Sharing and Economic Efficiency (Journal of Political Economy 113(5): 1088–1115, October 2005).
- Sharing Financial Risks across Non-Trading Generations: A Decentralized Alternative to Government Ownership of Private Equities (Journal of Monetary Economics 53(7), 2006)
- The Optimal Design of Social Security Benefits (Michigan Retirement Research Center, Paper No. 2008-197, September 2008)
- He has written extensively for The Wall Street Journal and other public media, in addition to dozens of academic research papers and book chapters.
