= David Wu (entrepreneur) =

American businessman

- Born: 1970 (age 55–56)
- Occupations: Founder and President, Sports Composite DE, Inc.
- Website: Sports Composite DE, Inc.

David Wu (born 1970) is co-founder and President of Sports Composite DE, Inc, which launched the online fantasy sports website RotoHog in February 2007. Wu and fellow founder Wharton School professor Kent Smetters develop a new way to play fantasy sports, in which team owners control the market for athletes by buying and selling athletes like stockbrokers on a trading floor.

== Background ==
Wu was born in 1970 and lived in Thousand Oaks, California from 1979 to 2006. Prior to Sports Composite DE, Inc., Wu was the CEO of SportsSE, Inc. He also founded VR One Net and was the general manager at Teltron Computers.

David Wu attended the University of California Los Angeles as an undergraduate and the University of Pennsylvania's Wharton School MBA program. Wu is also serving as Entrepreneur in Residence at the Wharton School as well as serving on the Executive Committee of the UCLA Venture Fund.
