= Untold Legends: The Warrior's Code =

2006 video game

- Developer: Sony Online Entertainment
- Publisher: Sony Online Entertainment
- Platform: PlayStation Portable
- Release: NA: March 28, 2006; EU: June 30, 2006; AU: September 14, 2006; JP: October 26, 2006
- Genre: Action role-playing
- Modes: Single-player, multiplayer

Untold Legends: The Warrior's Code is an action role-playing video game and the sequel to the handheld video game Untold Legends: Brotherhood of the Blade. It was released in March 2006. While similar to the original in gameplay, Warrior's Code introduced five new character classes, improved controls, a wider array of multiplayer modes, more character customizations, and shorter load times. The story is set within the same universe as Untold Legends: Brotherhood of the Blade and makes subtle connections by mentioning past characters and events.

== Gameplay ==
The Warrior's Code is a linear dungeon crawling action role-playing game as its predecessor. The player can choose between five different character classes each one providing different styles to play. Combat involves both ranged and melee attacks.

=== WiFi ===
The Warrior's Code includes multiplayer functionality utilizing the PSP's built-in WiFi adapter. The game offers a number of PvP gameplay modes as well as a fully-featured co-op game type that allows to team up with another player to complete the game. Unlike its predecessor Brotherhood of The Blade, The Warrior's Code also offers the player the ability to play online in infrastructure mode.

== Development ==
As a pre-order bonus, the game was shipped with a small action figure of the Guardian class.

== Reception ==
Reception

Aggregate score
Aggregator	Score
Metacritic	65/100

Review scores
Publication	Score
Edge	6/10
Electronic Gaming Monthly	5.5/10
Eurogamer	6/10
Game Informer	8.25/10
GamePro	3.5/5
GameSpot	6.9/10
GameSpy	3.5/5
GameTrailers	6.7/10
GameZone	6.9/10
IGN	6.9/10
Official U.S. PlayStation Magazine	2.5/5
Detroit Free Press	3/4
The Sydney Morning Herald	3/5

The game received "mixed or average reviews" according to video game review aggregator Metacritic.
