= Free Realms =

2009 video game

- Developer: Sony Online Entertainment
- Publisher: Sony Online Entertainment
- Engine: ForgeLight
- Platforms: Windows, Mac OS X, PlayStation 3
- Release: Windows; April 28, 2009; Mac OS X November 2, 2010; PlayStation 3 March 29, 2011
- Genres: Massively multiplayer online, adventure
- Mode: Multiplayer

Free Realms was a massively multiplayer online role-playing game (MMORPG) developed by Sony Online Entertainment (SOE) set in a fantasy-themed world called Sacred Grove. The game was first released on April 28, 2009, for Microsoft Windows. Versions for Mac OS X and PlayStation 3 followed in subsequent years. The game was free-to-play with leveling restrictions, with access to additional content available through a membership fee. The game allowed the player to fight, interact with other players, take up jobs, and more.

The game's servers were shut down on March 31, 2014, in a closure of three other SOE MMOs that year (Vanguard, Wizardry, Clone Wars Adventures). SOE gave as reason that it was necessary to devote resources to other games, and later, to move away from games oriented to children, when SOE President John Smedley stated in a Reddit ask-me-anything that "Kids don't spend well and it's very difficult to run a kids game. Turns out kids do mean stuff to each other a lot."

== Gameplay ==
Free Realms contained many of the staples of MMORPG's at the time, such as an open 3D environment to explore and quests to complete for usable rewards. Unlike most MMORPG's, Free Realms set out to appeal to children as well as adults with a family-friendly design and muted combat visuals, such as a lack of blood or explicit death; whirling stars would appear above a fallen enemy's head when defeated, indicating unconsciousness. The player could choose between two races, pixie or human, and take up any number of the fifteen available jobs on a single character. Jobs could involve combat or trade, though not all jobs did, and were leveled individually through questlines unique to each job.

Players in Free Realms were given a personal apartment for free; larger player homes were obtainable through membership or individual purchase. Homes could be decorated with over 100 unique items such as a stone head, dance floor, and rocket ship.

== Business model ==
The base game was available to download and play free of charge. Free Realms offered an optional membership for a single player, which allowed for 3 characters to be created per account, plus other benefits such as member-only quests, jobs and items. Free Realms also employed the Station Cash currency, usable across several SOE games, which could purchase items and features as microtransactions, as well as pay for membership.

Versions of Free Realms for Mac and PlayStation 3 were announced at SOE Fan Faire 2010. The Mac version was released on November 2, 2010. The PlayStation 3 version was released on March 31, 2011 on the US PlayStation Store, September 11 in the EU, and was accessible via the PlayStation Network.

The PC version was accessed via a browser plug-in paired with the Free Realms website, Candy Stand, or Miniclip. Before Free Realms was shut down, SOE planned to offer a "family" membership that would allow multiple logins through one account at the same time.

== Reception ==
Reception

Review scores
| Publication | Score |
|---|---|
| Eurogamer | 7/10 |
| IGN | 8.8 |
| USA Today | 4/5 |

In The New York Times, reviewer Seth Shiesel noted, "For Sony Online, Free Realms is a triumph of the company's own reinvention." USA Today reviewer Marc Saltzman gave Free Realms a 4/5 score, noting "Sony Online Entertainment's Free Realms is an extraordinary online adventure that is sure to please tweens and teens looking for a fun and free fantasy world." Eurogamer gave the game a largely positive review, with MMO editor Oli Welsh describing the game as "an effortlessly light and addictive indulgence". MMOHuts gave the game a 4/5 and noted that "Free Realms is one of the most feature-rich free MMORPGs currently available and it's all delivered in a beautiful package". In a review of Free Realms at USA Network's Character Arcade, David Chapman stated that the game "is a surprisingly deep game experience for a free to play model. There's never a shortage of things to do ... even if you never pay a dime to Sony."

John Smedley, president of Sony Online Entertainment, revealed that one million users had signed up to Free Realms 18 days after its launch. A month after release, the game had reached two million users, and registrations had continued growing at a steady rate from then on. SOE announced in February 2010 that Free Realms had eight million registered users, and the following April announced a player count of ten million, in time for the game's first anniversary.

== Comic ==
A Free Realms tie-in comic series was published by DC subsidiary WildStorm, beginning in 2009 for $4.99 per issue. The series held twelve issues, each of which contained a unique one-time code redeemable for an in-game virtual reward. The comic was written by J. S. Lewis, writer of the Grey Griffins series of young-adult fantasy books, with art by Allen Martinez and Jon Buran.

The comic featured Dane Kensington, an aspiring Brawler who set out on an adventure in hopes of becoming stronger.
