= Untold Legends: Dark Kingdom =

2006 video game

- Developer: Sony Online Entertainment
- Publishers: NA: Sony Online Entertainment; PAL: Electronic Arts
- Platform: PlayStation 3
- Release: NA: November 17, 2006; JP: February 22, 2007; AU: May 3, 2007; EU: May 4, 2007; KOR: June 16, 2007
- Genre: Action role-playing
- Modes: Single-player, multiplayer

Untold Legends: Dark Kingdom is a 2006 action role-playing game developed and published by Sony Online Entertainment for the PlayStation 3. Released as a launch title for the console, it is the third game in the Untold Legends series. Although set within the same universe, Dark Kingdom is unrelated in story to the first two games in the series. Electronic Arts released the game in PAL regions.

== Gameplay ==
Untold Legends: Dark Kingdom is a third-person dungeon crawling action RPG. Similar to other games in this style, the player will choose a class and go through dungeons killing enemies, gaining experience and leveling up. Dark Kingdom is also more linear than its predecessors, without hub towns that the player can come back to after finishing a dungeon/mission. Also, there are no NPC characters that the player can talk to repeatedly and also no Merchant to buy items. Health, essence and Mana can only be replenished from orbs in a variety of colors that drops from enemies.

There are three playable characters:

- Golan Kor: The warrior of the group, he is the strongest of the three characters, using a giant hammer/ax to fight. As the warrior, he has high physical strength but low magic power.
- Malakesh: The mage of the group, he is the smartest and most magically adept of the group. He uses a staff to fight. As the mage, he has low physical strength but high magic power.
- Zala: The scout of the group and the fastest of the three characters, she appears on the front cover of the game. She uses twin blades to fight. As the scout, she has medium physical strength and medium magic power.

== Plot ==
In the Kingdom of Dureth, the Dragon's Shade, a group of elite warriors, is defeating a clan of barbarians that threatens their homeland. The group consists of their leader, Torran, along with barbarian Golan Kor, wizard Malakesh, and scout Zala. While fighting the barbarian king, he reveals that Halaskar, the king of Dureth, has gone mad with power and is turning his people into beasts, presenting a dead beast as proof. Torran orders the Dragon's Shade to return home. When returning, they see Dureth burning and make the decision to assassinate Halaskar.

Returning to the castle, the Dragon's Shade meet with Halaskar, who orders them killed. Torren is fatally wounded and orders the remaining Dragon's Shade members to find a group named the Black Fang to kill Halaskar before succumbing to his wounds. While escaping the castle, the Dragon's Shade's ship is shot down, and the remaining survivors become stranded in the woods. They agree to split up and check old hideouts for the Black Fang.

After finding members of the Black Fang, the group climbs to the top of a tower to talk to the Tower Elder, who explains that Halaskar is using a priestess from another dimension to empower himself. He instructs the group to destroy three sites of anguish to depower the priestess. During this, one member of the Dragon's Shade is killed, while another betrays the group and destroys the Black Fang before being killed by the remaining member (the exact character in both situations changes depending on who you're playing as).

Despite this, the lone Dragon's Shade manages to destroy all three sites, killing the priestess. However, in the process, they absorb the priestess' essence and are doomed to die unless they manage to kill or cure Halaskar. The Tower Elder teleports the Dragon's Shade to the castle, where they defeat Halaskar. After that, the game's ending changes depending on which character you're playing as.

- Golan Kor chooses to remove the corruption from Halaskar, redeeming him and helping him restore Dureth and bring it into a prosperous golden age.
- Malakesh kills Halaskar, then uses his magic to make himself look like Halaskar, taking the throne for himself and running the kingdom as he believes it should be.
- Zala kills Halaskar and leaves the country, allowing Dureth to fall to the monsters and be invaded by the barbarians, and inadvertently freeing the Tower Elder from his prison.

== Development and release ==
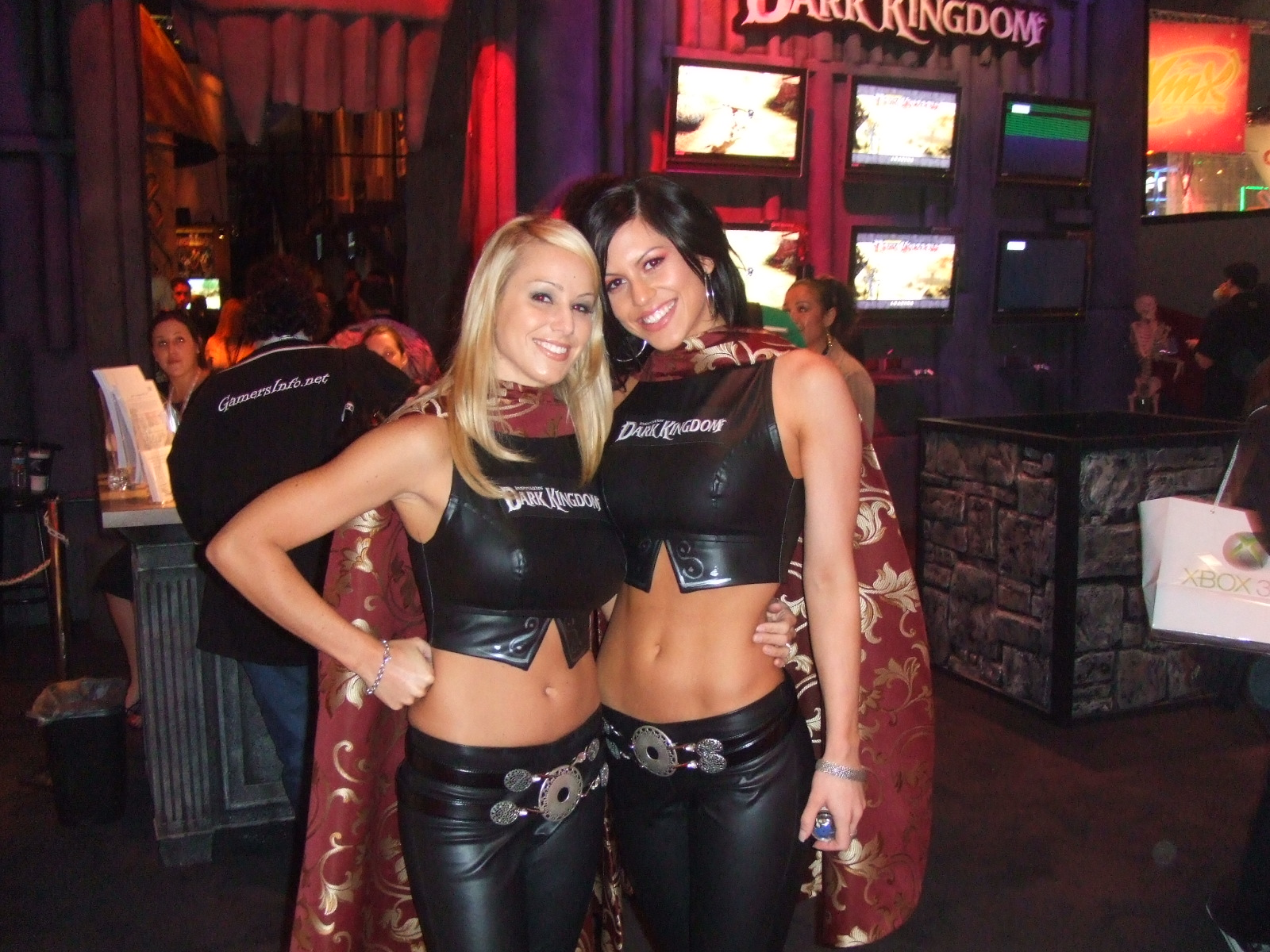
Promotion at E3 2006

The game was retailed 2 days ahead of the PlayStation 3 release in North America.

== Reception ==
Reception

Aggregate score
Aggregator	Score
Metacritic	58/100

Review scores
Publication	Score
Electronic Gaming Monthly	4.67/10
Eurogamer	4/10
Game Informer	8.25/10
GamePro	3/5
GameSpot	6/10
GameSpy	3/5
GameTrailers	5.6/10
GameZone	6.5/10
IGN	6.5/10
Official U.S. PlayStation Magazine	5/10
411Mania	6.5/10

The game received "mixed or average" reviews according to video game review aggregator Metacritic.
