= Tumblebugs =

2005 video game

- Developer: Wildfire Studios
- Publishers: GameHouse, Big Fish Games
- Designer: Joel Finch
- Programmers: Darren Baker; Adrian Cook
- Artists: Leon McBride; Rob Gilchrist
- Composers: Steven Baker; Rhiannon Phillips
- Engine: proprietary
- Platforms: iOS, Mac OS X, Windows, Wii (WiiWare)
- Release: May 18, 2005
- Genre: Puzzle
- Mode: Single-player

Tumblebugs is a fast-paced puzzle game developed by Wildfire Studios. It was released for a number of platforms, including Windows, Mac OS X, iOS and WiiWare.

An updated version for Windows, Tumblebugs Remastered was released for sale in April 2018.

== Gameplay ==
Tumblebugs features a 'bridge' shoot.

The objective is to save all of the bugs rolling round the screen, before they reach the opening to the Black Bug Empire's underground lair. When one bug reaches the opening, the other bugs in the line rush underground and the player loses a life. The player can save the bugs by firing a coloured bug from Tumble's back towards a group of two or more of the same coloured balls. When three or more of the same colour come in contact with each other, they are set free, possibly triggering other bugs to escape as part of a chain reaction.

Occasionally, Powerup indicators will appear on bugs in the queue. If the player completes the group while the Powerup is active, you will collect that Powerup. If it is not collected, Powerup will flash and eventually disappear.

=== Game modes ===
Tumblebugs has a choice of Story Mode or Time Trial Mode.

In Story Mode there are four backyards where the Black Bugs have taken control, and a total of 12 levels. The level selection screen shows all of the levels unlocked so far.

Time Trial Mode is a test to see how long the player can last on a single map, while the difficulty is gradually increased. The player can choose from all of the maps already unlocked in Story Mode.

=== Powerups ===
- Rewind: The Tumblebugs are briefly able to push back against their captors and move away from the lair.
- Fast Forward: Bugs move more quickly toward the lair, but 500 points is scored which can help a great deal with reaching 100% complete. This powerup did not appear in Tumblebugs 2.
- Stop: The bugs stop moving forward briefly, making shots easier.
- Ballistic Bugs: For a limited time, you can launch bugs right over the top of the queue to reach the bugs at the rear which were impossible to get to before.
- Wild Bugs: These multi-colored bugs match with any color they touch, even two at once.
- Star Bug: Can bust through several lines of bugs, freeing each one it comes into contact with. Useful for collecting other powerups.
- Blossom Bug: Bugs are freed all at once in a circle around the powerup.
- Color Burst: In a circle surrounding the powerup, bugs are all changed to the same color.
- E-X-T-R-A Letters: Collect all of the letters to spell out the word EXTRA to be awarded an extra life.

== iOS Version ==
The iOS versions of the game (the iPad version was called Tumblebugs HD) were released to the Apple App Store on July 9, 2012. The games were offered for free with in-app purchase to unlock the entire game. These versions include minor enhancements such as an aiming target which appears shortly after touching and holding on the device screen and Game Center integration.

== Sequel ==
Tumblebugs 2 was released on March 3, 2008.

== Tumblebugs Remastered ==
In April 2018, Wildfire released Tumblebugs Remastered for Windows, an update to the original game featuring HD graphics and audio, performance enhancements, widescreen support, and Windows 10 compatibility.
