= Star Chamber: The Harbinger Saga =

2003 video game

Star Chamber
- Developer: Nayantara Studios
- Publisher: Matrix Games
- Designer: Paul Dennen
- Platforms: Microsoft Windows, Mac OS
- Release: Original; November 13, 2003; Expansions released in 2004-2007
- Genres: Online collectible card game, turn-based strategy
- Modes: Single-player, multiplayer

Star Chamber was an online collectible card game (CCG) first released as just "Star Chamber" in 2003 by Nayantara Studios, later owned by Matrix Games and Worlds Apart Productions, and now owned by Sony Online Entertainment. The game ran on both the Microsoft Windows and Mac OS X platforms. It was free to download and play, with additional cards available for purchase. There was one base set and five expansion sets released for Star Chamber. The game was shut down on March 29, 2012. As compensation, Sony Online Entertainment offered players 3 months of Gold Membership in the online fantasy role-playing games EverQuest and EverQuest II, becoming available four days later.

== Reception ==
Reception

Aggregate score
Aggregator	Score
Metacritic	85/100

Review scores
Publication	Score
Computer Games Magazine	3.5/5
Computer Gaming World	4.5/5
GameSpot	8.8/10
GameZone	9/10

The original Star Chamber received "favorable" reviews according to the review aggregation website Metacritic.

The staff of Computer Games Magazine presented the game with their 2005 "Best Independent Game" award, and named it the year's ninth-best computer game.
