= Bruce Woodcock (computer games analyst) =

American computer and video game industry analyst

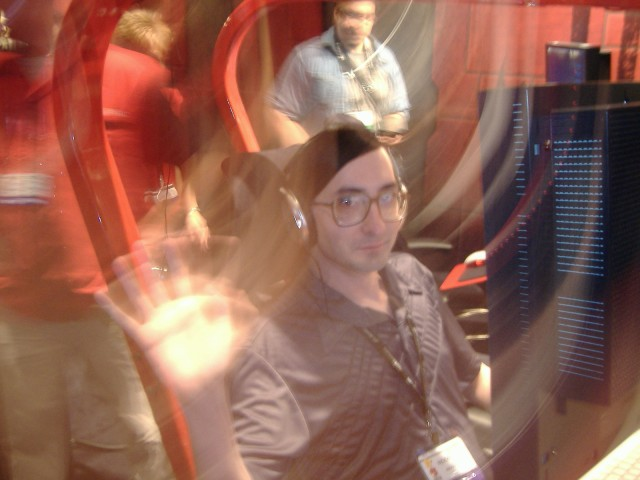
Bruce Woodcock at E3 2005

Bruce Sterling Woodcock (born 1970) is an American computer and video games industry analyst, best known for his work on subscription tracking of massively multiplayer online games via his website MMOGCHART.COM.

== Biography ==
Woodcock was born in the small farming community of Sullivan, Missouri, on June 20, 1970, the youngest of three children to Myron and Mary Woodcock. He graduated from Sullivan Senior High School in 1988, and then went on to Purdue University, studying physics, philosophy, and computer science. In 1989, he became involved in internet gaming on early MUDs, and in 1990, was briefly running two of the largest TinyMUDs of the time, TinyMUD Classic and Islandia. His original online handle was Sir Bruce Sterling, which was later shortened to Sir Bruce when he began posting on message boards.

Leaving college early, he moved to Colorado Springs, Colorado, in 1991, where he began a career in information technology. In 1993, he moved to San Jose, California, where he subsequently worked as a system administrator at early internet service provider Netcom (USA), and then Network Appliance, eventually leaving in 1997 with $250,000 in stock options. He started to maintain a presence on the Yahoo! financial message boards as he closely tracked the performance of Network Appliance, helped the company's fortunes, and built his own portfolio to $3 million.

With the advent of the MMOGs, Chron X and Ultima Online in 1997, Woodcock became a player and beta-tester for this genre of game. He invested in and joined the board of directors for Playnet and their game World War II Online, and in August 2002, began his research, reporting, and tracking of MMOG subscription numbers, which has become a standard of reference both inside and outside the MMOG industry. In November 2004 his work was moved to its own dedicated website, MMOGCHART.COM. The site has not been updated since May 2008.

Woodcock currently lives in San Jose, working as an independent game consultant and analyst for the MMOG industry. He is a member of the International Game Developers Association, and has spoken on game industry topics at trade shows such as the Austin Game Conference.

== Public speaker ==
- "What the Market Research Tells Us - Where MMOs are Going and How Are we Going to Get There" (Speaker), Austin Game Conference, September 6, 2006
- "Building Massively Multiplayer Games on a Budget" (Panelist), Austin Game Conference, September 10, 2004
- "Massively Multiplayer Games on a Shoestring Budget" (Panelist), Austin Game Conference, September 11, 2003

== Works ==
- "An Analysis of MMOG Subscription Growth", MMOGCHART.COM, 2002 - 2008..
- "Confessions of an MMOG Cross-Dresser", The Escapist #77, December, 2006
- "Is Rape Wrong on Azeroth?", The Escapist #69, October, 2006
- "IGDA 2004 Persistent Worlds Whitepaper", contributor, January, 2005
- "Illusions of Reality", Quanta #3, February, 1990
- Grimtooth's Traps Too, December 1982, Flying Buffalo Computer-Conflict Simulation, contributor, The Catastrophic Keyhole, ISBN 0-940244-78-0
