= Tanarus (video game) =

1997 video game

- Developer: Verant Interactive
- Publisher: Sony Interactive Studios America
- Designers: John Smedley; Kevin McCann
- Composer: George Sanger
- Platform: Windows
- Release: NA: December 12, 1997; EU: 1998
- Genre: First-person shooter
- Mode: Multiplayer

Tanarus is a discontinued 1997 online-only multiplayer first-person shooter video game developed by Verant Interactive and published by Sony Interactive Studios America for Windows. It is unusual for not being released on any PlayStation console, despite Sony Computer Entertainment owning the rights to the game. Originally titled Armorgeddon, Verant was forced to change the name when another game with that name was discovered. It was released in late 1997. Verant would later gain recognition by developing EverQuest for Sony Online Entertainment. The game was included in Sony Online Entertainment's Station Exchange program in 2007, and shut down on June 10, 2010.

== Gameplay ==
Game arenas (also known as "maps") allowed up to four teams to play at the same time. Each team could contain up to five players. Most of the arenas were created by the player community, although the maps had to be hosted by Sony Online, who would rotate the maps on a monthly basis.

Upon joining the arena, each player selected a tank to operate from the five models available. The tank would then be customized through the utilization of various weapons and support modules. Numerous combinations could be used, contingent on what the player wished to do (capture other teams' flags or fight, for example). The player may have then switched tank models during the game by using one of their base's recon stations. Players saw the Tanarus world through the tank's gun turret.

There was no set objective in Tanarus, though the game presented various goals of team-based combat: Generally, to destroy the other colors' tanks, capture recon stations to provide a tactical or strategic advantage, and, finally, to capture another team's flag, bringing it back to their own base, thus destroying everyone on that team.

== History ==
Tanarus was developed by Verant Interactive and published by Sony Interactive Studios America. It was originally called Armorgeddon, but its name had to be changed due to another game being discovered with that name. It released in late 1997. It was included as part of Sony Online Entertainment's Station Exchange program in 2007 before being shut down on June 10, 2010.

== Reception ==
Reception

Review scores
Publication	Score
Computer Games Strategy Plus	3/5
Computer Gaming World	2.5/5
GameRevolution	B
GameSpot	8/10
Next Generation	4/5
PC Gamer (US)	87%

The game received favorable reviews. GameSpot's Chris Gregson concluded, "Some might think $9.95 per month is a little pricey for a single game - that's what Kesmai charges for all of its sundry online-only games on GameStorm, for example - but they need to remember that there's really no other game online like this one. And if it gets its hooks in you, you'll probably consider the price a bargain."

Next Generation said, "While the graphics and sound have been kept to a minimum to reduce latency, they're by no means ugly, and with 3D acceleration, there are enough special effects to keep almost anyone happy. At $9.99 a month, Tanarus isn't the greatest value for everybody, but for those with the persistence and skill to become good at the game, it's worth the time and money."
