= Arden =

Arden may refer to:

== Places ==
Australia

- Arden Street, North Melbourne, Victoria
- Arden railway station, Melbourne

Canada

- Arden, Ontario

Denmark

- Arden, Denmark, a town
  - Arden Municipality, a former municipality, including the town of Arden

United Kingdom

- Arden, Warwickshire (formerly called the Forest of Arden)
- Arden, Argyll and Bute
- Arden, Glasgow

United States

- Arden, North Sacramento, California
- Arden, Delaware
- Arden, Indianapolis, a suburb of Indianapolis, Indiana
- Arden on the Severn, Maryland
- Arden (Andover, Massachusetts)
- Arden Hills, Minnesota
- Arden, Missouri
- Arden, Nevada
- Arden, New York
- Arden Valley Road, located in Southfields, New York
- Arden, North Carolina
- Arden, Texas
- Arden, Washington
- Arden, Barbour County, West Virginia
- Arden, Berkeley County, West Virginia
- Arden (estate), a National Historic Landmark in New York

== People and fictional characters ==
- Arden (name), including lists of people and fictional characters with the given name or surname

== Schools ==
- Arden University, a private distance and blended learning university in the UK
- Arden Academy, Knowle, UK
- Arden School of Theatre, Manchester, UK
- Arden Anglican School, Beecroft and Epping, suburbs on the North Shore of Sydney, New South Wales, Australia

== Other uses ==
- The Arden or Polish Ardennes, a Polish breed of horse
- Arden (automobile), an English car
- Arden International, a multiple formula racing team created and run by Garry Horner
- Arden Theatre Company, a regional theatre in Philadelphia
- Arden: The World of Shakespeare, a short-lived research and teaching MMO game
- Tannoy Arden, a model of loudspeaker system by Tannoy Ltd.
- A tune by George Thalben-Ball to the hymn 'O for a thousand tongues to sing' by Charles Wesley.

== See also ==
- Arden Shakespeare, a series of scholarly editions of the works of William Shakespeare
- Arden syntax
- Arden Wine Bar and Kitchen, Portland, Oregon, U.S.
- Arden-Arcade, California
- Ardennes, a region in Belgium, Luxembourg and France
- Ardennes (disambiguation)
