= ILabour Project =

The iLabour Project is a research project at the Oxford Internet Institute funded by the European Research Council and led by the Finnish economic sociologist and Internet researcher Vili Lehdonvirta.

The iLabour project monitors the global development of work mediated by online platforms and measures these developments in an economic indicator, the Online Labour Index. The project has enjoyed media coverage from various international outlets.
