= Niverlée =

Niverlée Niverlêye (Walloon)
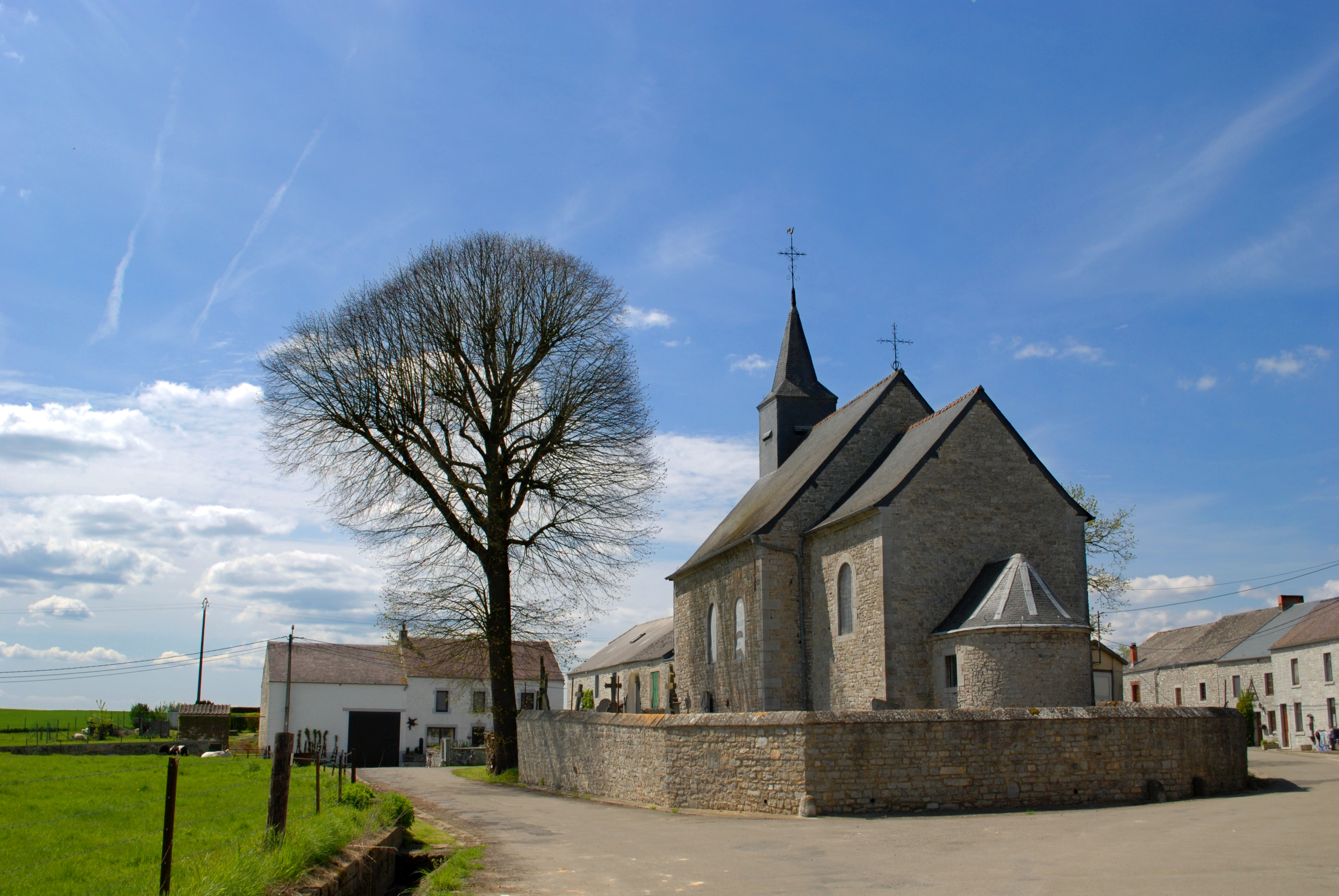
- Niverlée

- Location within Belgium Location within Europe
- Coordinates: 50°07′01″N 04°41′56″E
- Country: Belgium
- Region: Wallonia
- Province: Namur
- Municipality: Doische

Niverlée (French pronunciation: [nivɛʁle]; Walloon: Niverlêye) is a village in Wallonia and a district of the municipality of Doische, located in the province of Namur, Belgium.

Until the French Revolution, Niverlée belonged to the lords of Hierges. It is mentioned in written sources in 1140 as Nevreleis. The village church is in a Neoclassical style and its current appearance dates from 1757. However, the building as such is medieval. Crusader Héribrand III of Hierges (died 1117) was buried in the church.
