= List of protected heritage sites in Doische =

This table shows an overview of the protected heritage sites in the Walloon town Doische. This list is part of Belgium's national heritage.

Object	Year/architect	Town/section	Address	Coordinates	Number^{?}	Image
The Saint-Servais church and the walls of the cemetery around the building (M); the area including the walls with the church and the cemetery (S) ^{(nl)} ^{(fr)}		Doische		50.131884°N 4.713710°E	93018-CLT-0001-01	
The chapel of Saint-Hilaire and its environment ^{(nl)} ^{(fr)}		Doische		50.113153°N 4.660841°E	93018-CLT-0002-01	Het kapel Saint-Hilaire en zijn omgeving
The complex of the chapel of Saint-Hilaire and its environment ^{(nl)} ^{(fr)}		Doische		50.112763°N 4.659180°E	93018-CLT-0003-01	Het complex van het kapel Saint-Hilaire en de omgeving
The Notre-Dame de l'Assomption church, cemetery and surrounding walls ^{(nl)} ^{(fr)}		Doische		50.117573°N 4.701212°E	93018-CLT-0004-01	De Notre-Dame de l'Assomption-kerk, kerkhof, en de omringende muren
The church of Sainte-Colombe ^{(nl)} ^{(fr)}		Doische		50.187381°N 4.736258°E	93018-CLT-0005-01	De Sainte-Colombe-kerk
The church of Sainte-Colombe and its surroundings ^{(nl)} ^{(fr)}		Doische		50.187161°N 4.735977°E	93018-CLT-0006-01	
The old mill and its surroundings ^{(nl)} ^{(fr)}		Doische		50.183269°N 4.742253°E	93018-CLT-0007-01	De oude watermolen en haar omgeving
The works upstream and downstream of the mill Soulme ^{(nl)} ^{(fr)}		Doische		50.184095°N 4.742431°E	93018-CLT-0008-01	
The Prèle mill and its surroundings ^{(nl)} ^{(fr)}		Doische		50.192424°N 4.750004°E	93018-CLT-0009-01	
All archaeological finds, ruins and the surroundings of the Gallo-Roman site called Tienne de Noël " ^{(nl)} ^{(fr)}		Doische		50.109907°N 4.593572°E	93018-CLT-0010-01	
The chapel "Bonne Fontaine" and its surroundings on the Vodelée ^{(nl)} ^{(fr)}		Doische		50.178074°N 4.723627°E	93018-CLT-0011-01	
Area of special value of the river Bacquet (source) ^{(nl)} ^{(fr)}		Doische		50.145125°N 4.788380°E	93018-CLT-0012-01	

== See also ==
- List of protected heritage sites in Namur (province)
- Doische
