= Vili Lehdonvirta =

Finnish economic sociologist

Vili Lehdonvirta is Professor of Economic Sociology and Digital Social Research at the Oxford Internet Institute, University of Oxford, and Professor of Technology Policy at the Department of Computer Science, Aalto University. He is also a senior research fellow of Jesus College, Oxford, an associate member of the Department of Sociology, Oxford and a former Fellow of the Alan Turing Institute, London. Lehdonvirta is an economic sociologist, whose research draws on theories and approaches from economic sociology, new institutional economics, and political science. His research examines the socio-economic and political implications of new digital technologies.

== Research ==
Lehdonvirta is one of the world's most cited authors on gig work and the platform economy. He was the principal investigator of iLabour, a major research project on online freelancing and the gig economy, funded by the European Research Council. He is the creator (together with Otto Kässi and Fabian Stephany) of the Online Labour Index, an economic indicator and international reference for the measurement of the global online gig-economy. He also led research projects on online labour markets' effects in rural areas, crowd workers' skill development, and changing online worker livelihoods during the COVID-19 pandemic. Lehdonvirta's research on platforms, marketplaces, and digital commerce is summarised in Cloud Empires: How Digital Platforms Are Overtaking the State and How We Can Regain Control, published by MIT Press and translated to Italian by Einaudi. The book was announced as a finalist for a 2023 PROSE Award by the Association of American Publishers (AAP).

Lehdonvirta's earlier research dealt with the history and politics of Bitcoin and blockchain. His research on virtual goods, virtual consumption and digital games is summarised in Virtual Economies: Design and Analysis, co-authored with Edward Castronova, published by MIT Press and translated to Japanese and Chinese.

Lehdonvirta's recent research focuses on the geopolitics of digital infrastructures, such as cloud data centres and GPUs.

== Policy work ==
Lehdonvirta has advised companies, policy makers, and international organisations in Europe, the United States and Japan. He was a member of the European Commission's Expert Group on the Online Platform Economy, which supports the Commission in monitoring the evolution of the online platform economy for evidence-based and problem-focused policymaking and the High-Level Group on Digital Transmission and EU Labour markets, which provides analysis and advice to the commission, and explores policy options.

== Education ==
Lehdonvirta holds a PhD in Economic Sociology from the University of Turku (2009) and a MSc from the Helsinki University of Technology (2005). Previously he worked at the London School of Economics, the University of Tokyo, and the Helsinki Institute for Information Technology. Before his academic career, he worked as a game programmer for Jippii.

== Published works ==
=== Books ===
- Cloud Empires: How digital platforms are overtaking the state and how we can regain control. (2022) ISBN 9780262047227
- Virtual Economies: Design and Analysis. (2014), With Edward Castronova ISBN 0262535068

=== Academic articles ===
- Hertog, E., Fukuda, S., Matsukura, R., Nagase, N. & Lehdonvirta, V. (2023) "The future of unpaid work: Estimating the effects of automation on time spent on housework and care work in Japan and the UK". Technological Forecasting and Social Change.
- Lehdonvirta, V. (2018) "Flexibility in the Gig Economy: Managing Time on Three Online Piecework Platforms". New Technology, Work & Employment: 33 (1) 13–29.
- Ogembo, D. and Lehdonvirta, V. (2020) "Taxing Earnings from the Platform Economy: An EU Digital Single Window for Income Data?" British Tax Review [2020](1): 82–101.
- Braesemann, F., Lehdonvirta, V., and Kässi, O. (2020) "ICTs and the Urban-Rural Divide: Can Online Labour Platforms Bridge the Gap?" Information, Communication & Society.
- Vidan, G. and Lehdonvirta, V. (2019) "Mine the gap: Bitcoin and the maintenance of trustlessness." New Media & Society 21(1): 42–59.
- Lehdonvirta, V., Kässi, O., Hjorth, I., Barnard, H., and Graham, M. (2019) "The Global Platform Economy: A New Offshoring Institution Enabling Emerging-Economy Microproviders." Journal of Management 45(2): 567-599.
- Lee, S., and Lehdonvirta, V., (2020) "New Digital Safety Net or Just More ‘Friendfunding’? Institutional Analysis of Medical Crowdfunding in the United States." Information, Communication & Society.
- Wood, A. J. and Lehdonvirta, V. (2021) "Antagonism beyond employment: how the ‘subordinated agency’ of labour platforms generates conflict in the remote gig economy." Socio-Economic Review.
- Kässi, O, and V Lehdonvirta. (2022) "Do Microcredentials Help New Workers Enter the Market? Evidence from an Online Labor Platform." Journal of Human Resources.
