= Subin Park (activist) =

South Korean activist

- Born: 1988 or 1989 (age 36–37); South Korea
- Known for: Co-founder of the Stair Crusher Club

Subin Park (Korean: 박수빈; born 1988 or 1989) is a South Korean accessibility activist and co-founder of the Stair Crusher Club (계단뿌셔클럽), a non-profit project which collects and shares information on the wheelchair-friendliness of places in South Korea. She was included in the BBC's 100 Women of 2024 for her work with the Stair Crusher Club.

== Biography ==
Subin Park was born in South Korea. At the age of five, Park began using a wheelchair due to a traffic accident. Park studied Business Administration at Seoul National University. In 2008, she graduated with a distinction. While studying, she undertook an exchange semester at the University of Toronto. From 2019 to 2021, Park completed a postgraduate degree at the Oxford Internet Institute where she researched Europe's digital platform economy. Park worked for Tada, a ride-hailing service, where she oversaw service planning.

== The Stair Crusher Club ==
While working at Tada, Park and her co-worker Dae-ho Lee began working on the Stair Crusher Club as a side-project. After struggling to find places to eat due to venues not being wheelchair-friendly, Park and Lee started gathering information on the wheelchair-friendliness of places in Seongnam, since they both lived there at the time. After leaving Tada in 2023, they launched the Stair Crusher Club as an independent company.

14,000 locations across South Korea have been audited for accessibility by the Stair Crusher Club with the help of over 2,000 contributors.
