= A Rape in Cyberspace =

1993 article by Julian Dibbell

"A Rape in Cyberspace" (Note: Full title: "A Rape in Cyberspace, or How an Evil Clown, a Haitian Trickster Spirit, Two Wizards, and a Cast of Dozens Turned a Database into a Society") is an article written by freelance journalist Julian Dibbell and first published in The Village Voice in 1993, and later included in Dibbell's 1998 book My Tiny Life. The article is about the aftermath and community response to a March 1993 sexual misconduct incident in the virtual world LambdaMOO. Prior to "A Rape in Cyberspace" directing media and academic attention to the incident, LambdaMOO users referred to it as the Bungle Affair.

Lawrence Lessig has said that his chance reading of Dibbell's article was a key influence on his interest in the field. Sociologist David Trend called it "one of the most frequently cited essays about cloaked identity in cyberspace".

== History ==
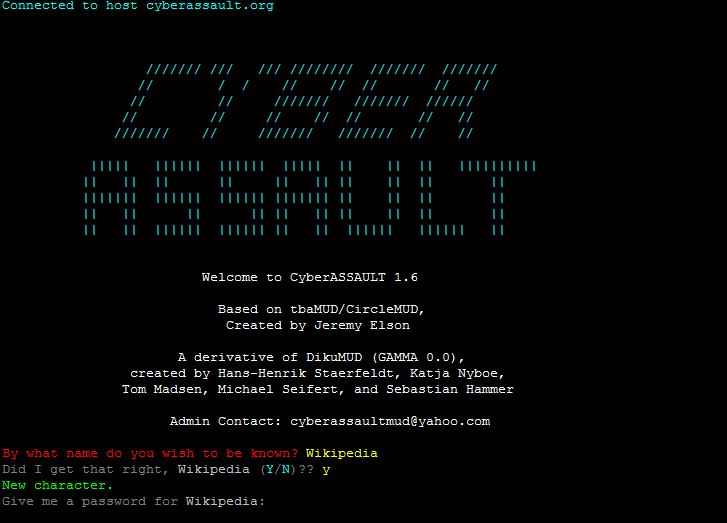
An image of a MUD (Multi-User Dungeon) similar to the one where the cyber-rape occurred

Julian Dibbell's journalism career began in the music industry, though his writings eventually came to focus mainly the Internet, including various subcultures such as LambdaMOO, a MUD, which itself was further divided into subcultures, a phenomenon he inadvertently encountered through his girlfriend. One day, when he was having difficulty contacting her by phone, he searched for her in LambdaMOO because he knew she was a visitor. When he found her, she had been in a meeting regarding how to resolve the issue of a player named Mr. Bungle.

"A Rape in Cyberspace" describes a "cyberrape" that took place on a Monday night in March 1993 and discusses the repercussions of this act on the virtual community and subsequent changes to the design of the MUD program.

LambdaMOO allows players to interact using avatars. The avatars are user-programmable and may interact automatically with each other and with objects and locations in the community. Users interacted through script, as there were no graphics or images on the MUD at the time.

The "cyberrape" itself was performed by Mr. Bungle, who leveraged a "voodoo doll" subprogram that allowed him to make actions that were falsely attributed to other characters in the virtual community. The "voodoo doll" subprogram was eventually rendered useless by a character named Zippy. These actions, which included describing sexual acts that characters performed on each other and forcing the characters to perform acts upon themselves, went far beyond the community norms to that point and continued for several hours. They were interpreted as sexual violation of the avatars who were made to act sexually, and incited outrage among the LambdaMOO users, raising questions about the boundaries between real-life and virtual reality, and how LambdaMOO should be governed.

Following Mr. Bungle's actions, several users posted on the in-MOO mailing list, *social-issues, about the emotional trauma caused by his actions. One user whose avatar was a victim, called his voodoo doll activities "a breach of civility" while, in real life, "post-traumatic tears were streaming down her face". However, despite the passionate emotions including anger voiced by many users on LambdaMOO, none were willing to punish the user behind Mr. Bungle through real-life means.

Three days after the event, the users of LambdaMOO arranged an online meeting, which Dibbell attended under his screenname (Dr. Bombay), to discuss what should be done about Mr. Bungle. The meeting lasted approximately two hours and forty-five minutes, but no conclusive decisions were made. After attending the meeting, one of the master-programmers of LambdaMOO (with screenname JoeFeedback), decided on his own to terminate Mr. Bungle's user account. Additionally, upon his return from his business trip, LambdaMOO's main creator, Pavel Curtis (screenname Archwizard Haakon), set up a system of petitions and ballots where anyone could put to popular vote anything requiring administrative powers for its implementation. Through this system, LambdaMOO users put into place a @boot command, which temporarily disconnects disruptive guest users from the server, as well as a number of other new features.

It was later discovered that Mr. Bungle's identity consisted not only of a young man attending NYU, but also a group of NYU students on a dorm floor which encouraged his actions by calling out suggestions during the evening of the rape.

== Analysis ==
=== Legal and ethical debate ===
Dibbell's "A Rape in Cyberspace" brought issues of online abuse to light that had not been heard much of during its time. It led to some debate about ethical and legal issues, free speech, how to continue to build the Internet, how to regulate it, and how to potentially prosecute crimes that had never existed before. Since the article was written, interaction with online media has become ubiquitous, making it harder to avoid negative actions of "trolls" and harassers. This sparked the debate of whether these events have real-world repercussions, as the psychological damage the users feel is real.

=== Politics ===
In the aftermath of the event, members of the LambdaMOO community came together to discuss how to handle what happened. The community attained a political self-consciousness about itself when deciding how to punish Mr. Bungle for his actions. Prior to the event, LambdaMOO's creator Pavel Curtis released a document known as the "New Direction" which stated that the "wizards" were to serve the purpose of technicians and were not to make decisions which affect the social life of the MOO and to only implement decisions made by the community as a whole. This forced the LambdaMOO community to invent their own self-governance from scratch; in the case of Mr. Bungle, it was decided that his character would be deleted.

=== Psychology ===
"A Rape in Cyberspace" demonstrates how the virtual world and the real world interact, as exemplified by how Dibbell's experiences in the online community affected his real-world thought process. It also demonstrates the emotional effect which the events that happened within LambdaMOO had on the players. Even though it happened in virtual reality, it was a symbolic form of violation in both realities.

== Legacy ==
Dibbell's "A Rape in Cyberspace" and other publications that he has made about the Bungle incident have been seen by many scholars and professionals as a key foundation in the topic of virtual rape. The article has been used to take a look at the moral nature of actions within the virtual world.

Since the Mr. Bungle case, LambdaMOO set up an arbitration system so that people can file suit against one another and this system has been put into use with the matter of a virtual death.

Over two decades later, these events remain one of the primary advertisements for LambdaMOO. Research students still regularly visit the MOO (often sent there by their professors) and start asking users about these events.

This article draws attention to a more modern version of the platonic binary, otherwise known as the mind-body split. The event described in the article illustrates the intellectual self from the physical self through the typing of words on a screen.

Dibbell continued to participate in LambdaMOO, up to 30 hours a week, and eventually wrote My Tiny Life about his experiences, incorporating the article. He remains somewhat astonished at the impact it has had, saying in 1998, "No piece I had done before had managed to convey as vividly to readers the fact that there was something wild and different going on online, something that might profoundly alter the way they related to words and communication and culture in general."

The article raised awareness in the legal implications of online activity, including Lawrence Lessig, and Dibbell himself would go on to teach cyberlaw as a Fellow at Stanford Law School Center for the Internet and Society. The article is also considered one of the earliest examples of New Games Journalism where review of computer games are meshed with social observation and consideration of surrounding issues.

In 2018 The Village Voice reprinted the article following a reported gang rape in Roblox.
