= PlaceWare =

Web conferencing software company, 1996–2003

PlaceWare was an American provider of web conferencing software, founded in 1996 by Xerox PARC researchers Pavel Curtis, Mike Dixon, and David Nichols as a spin-off from the research centre. The company developed software that allowed large numbers of participants to attend online presentations and meetings via a web browser, with a host controlling the shared content and audience members able to submit questions and respond to polls. Microsoft acquired PlaceWare in April 2003 and renamed its core product Microsoft Office Live Meeting.

== Background ==
PlaceWare's founders brought experience from Xerox PARC's research into virtual environments and online collaboration. Pavel Curtis, one of the co-founders, was previously known for creating LambdaMOO, an influential early multi-user virtual environment at PARC. The company's technology drew on this background in shared online spaces, applying it to the emerging market for internet-based business presentations and remote meetings.

PlaceWare Auditorium, the company's first product, launched in March 1997. It supported large-scale online events with features for slide sharing, live audio, audience polling and Q&A. Early customers included Hewlett-Packard, Intel, Sun Microsystems and PBS.

== Acquisition by Microsoft ==
Microsoft completed its acquisition of PlaceWare in April 2003. Under Microsoft, the product was rebranded as Microsoft Office Live Meeting and integrated with the Microsoft Office suite. Live Meeting was subsequently superseded by Microsoft Lync and later Skype for Business, with online meeting functionality eventually incorporated into Microsoft Teams.
