= Gimnée =

Gimnée Djimnêye (Walloon)
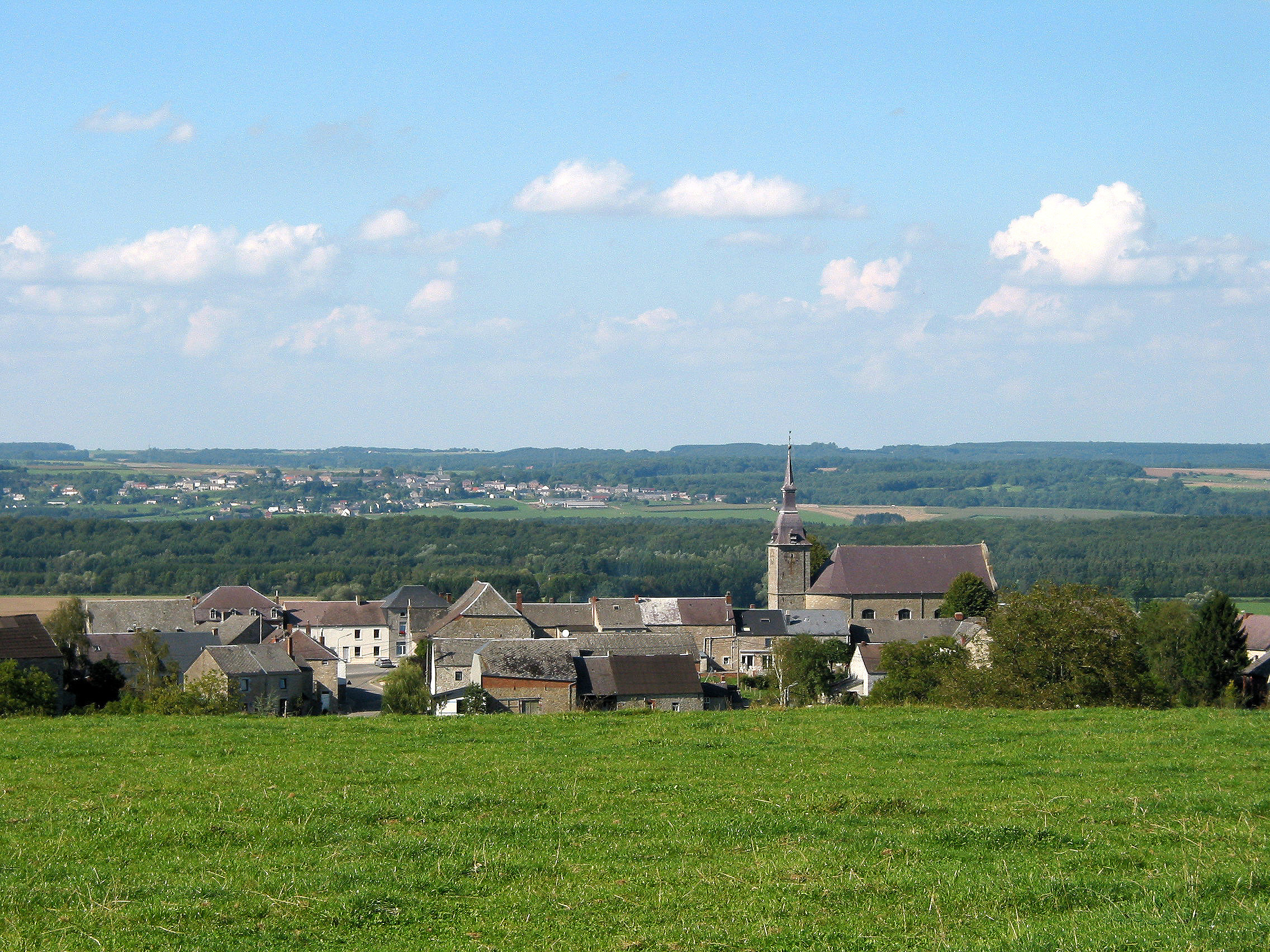
- Gimnée

- Location within Belgium Location within Europe
- Coordinates: 50°07′58″N 04°42′54″E
- Country: Belgium
- Region: Wallonia
- Province: Namur
- Municipality: Doische

Gimnée (Walloon: Djimnêye) is a village in Wallonia and a district of the municipality of Doische, located in the province of Namur, Belgium.

The settlement is traceable back to a Roman villa which was founded here during Gallo-Roman times. In the Middle Ages, it was part of the holdings of the lords of Hierges. The current village church dates from 1770.
