= Ardennes (disambiguation) =

Ardennes, a region of forested hills between Belgium, Luxembourg, Germany, France. Ardennes or Ardenne, or variation, may refer to:

== Places ==
- Ardennes (department), France; a subnational division
- Flemish Ardennes, or Ardennnes, Belgium, a region of Flanders
- Ardennes and Eifel, a mountainous set, including the Ardennes mountain range
- 4849 Ardenne, an asteroid

== People ==
- Agnes van Ardenne (born 1950), Dutch politician
- Justine Henin Hardenne (born 1982), tennis player
- Manfred von Ardenne (1907–1997), German scientist
- Paul Ardenne (born 1956), historian
- Sigfried, Count of the Ardennes (died 998), the first person to rule Luxembourg
- Ardennes-Verdun dynasty, a ruling house of Lorraine

== Military ==
- Army of the Ardennes, French revolutionary army
- Battle of the Ardennes (1914), a battle of the First World War
- Battle of Ardennes (1940), see Battle of France
- Battle of Ardennes (1944), the Battle of the Bulge
- Ardenne Abbey massacre (1944), during the Battle of Normandy
- Operation Ardennes (2007), part of the Iraq War
- Ardennes American Cemetery and Memorial, a Second World War American military war grave cemetery

== Facilities and structures ==
- Canal des Ardennes, between the Aisne and Meuse rivers
- Ardenne High School, St. Andrew, Jamaica
- Ardenne Abbey, former abbey in Calvados, France
- Château royal d'Ardenne (Ardennes royal castle), Belgium

== Other uses ==
- Lancia Ardennes, 1930s car
- Beurre d'Ardenne (Ardenne butter), a style of butter
- Ardennes classics, cycling races
- Ardennes (horse), a breed of draft horse
- The Ardennes (film), a 2015 Dutch Belgian drama film

== See also ==
- Champagne-Ardenne, a former region (subnational division) of France
- Alsace-Champagne-Ardenne-Lorraine, temporary name for Grand Est, a current region of France
- University of Reims Champagne-Ardenne, a French university
- Gare de Champagne-Ardenne TGV, rail station in Bezzanes, France
- TER Champagne-Ardenne, former rail network of Champagne-Ardenne
- Arden (disambiguation)
