= Terra Nova (blog) =

Collaborative blog covering academic research in gaming

- Screenshot of Terra Nova as of July 25, 2008
- Website type: Collaborative blog
- Creators: Edward Castronova, Julian Dibbell, Dan Hunter, and Greg Lastowka
- Website: http://terranova.blogs.com/terra_nova/
- Commercial: No
- Registration: None
- Launched: 2003
- Current status: Offline

Terra Nova was a collaborative blog for academics and professionals in game studies. It focused primarily on the study of virtual worlds.

Started in 2003 by Edward Castronova, Julian Dibbell, Dan Hunter, and Greg Lastowka, Terra Nova initially focused heavily on research and questions surrounding real money trading (RMT) in online virtual worlds. Coverage later expanded to include impacts of gaming on culture, architecture and law.

Terra Nova is cited in the traditional media on issues of gaming in virtual worlds, most notably issues regarding Second Life and World of Warcraft. Various issues have been discussed, from the virtual economy of Star Wars Galaxies to the impact of learning in MMOs.

Terra Nova's end was made official on September 25, 2014. The most recent post made was on April 28, 2015.
