= Microsoft RoundTable =

360-degree videoconferencing device

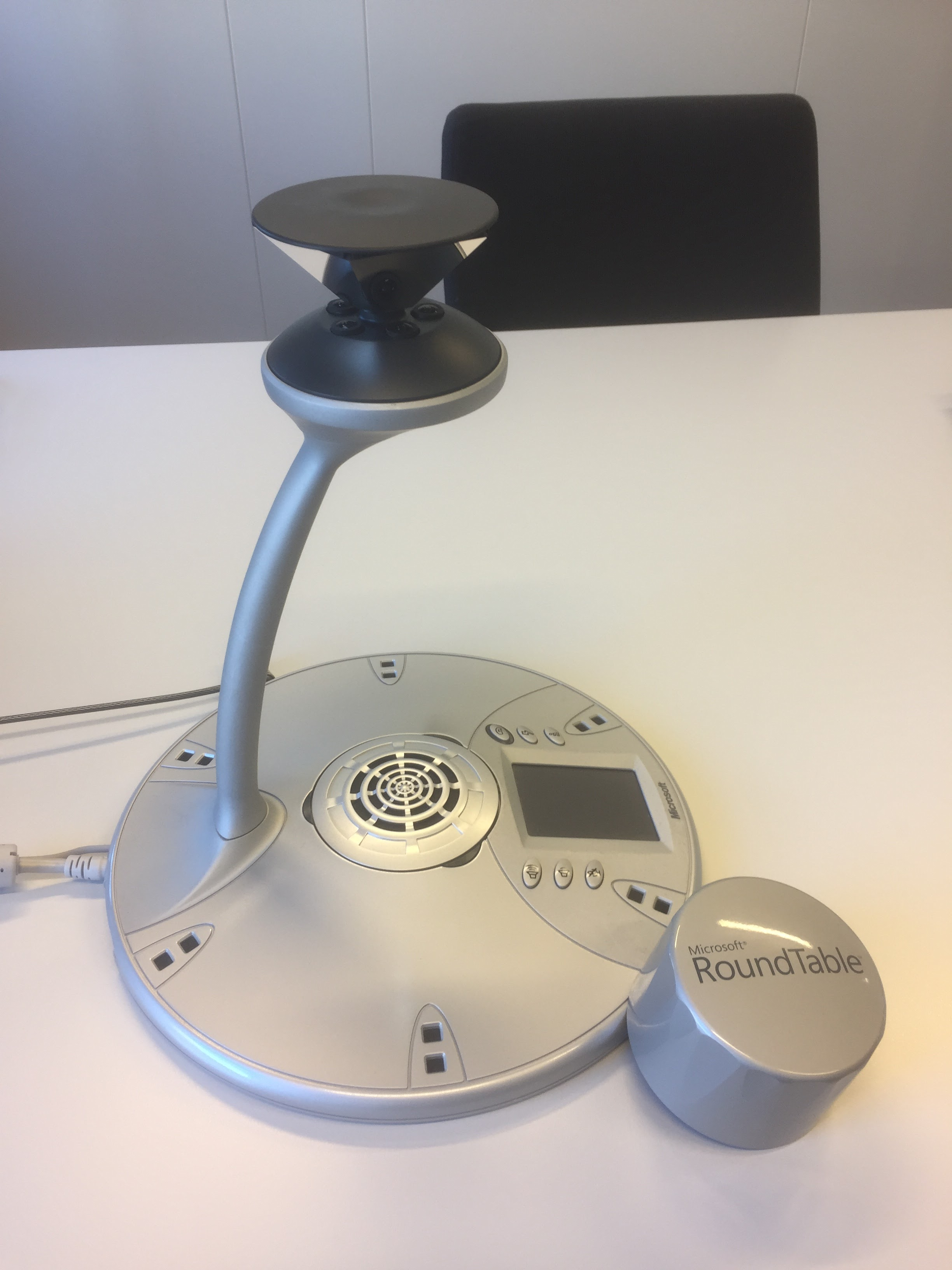
A Microsoft RoundTable.

Microsoft RoundTable was a videoconferencing device with a 360-degree camera that was designed to work with Microsoft Office Communications Server 2007 or Microsoft Office Live Meeting. RoundTable provided remote meeting participants with panoramic video of everyone sitting around the conference table. In addition, RoundTable contained active speaker detection technology that provides high-resolution video of the active speaker in a meeting, and tracked the flow of conversation in real time, switching between different meeting participants as they speak.

RoundTable was a plug-and-play USB device that also functioned as a standard PSTN speakerphone.

Core technology used in RoundTable was invented and originally developed by Ross Cutler and other researchers at Microsoft Research. Ross Cutler and Senthil Velayutham founded the RoundTable product group as part of the Microsoft Greenhouse and led by GM Jeff Finan to commercialize the technology. The product launched in 2007. It used the Windows CE operating system on the main processor and other operating systems on the supporting DSP chipsets.

In 2009 the Roundtable device was licensed to Polycom and rebranded as the Polycom CX5000. The device has an identical feature set but is branded as a Polycom unit. Polycom has since launched two new products based upon the RoundTable design – the CX5100 and the CX5500, supporting 1080p resolution video. The CX5100 is a USB only device. The CX5500 operates like the CX5100 as a 360-degree camera when plugged in to a PC running the Skype for Business client, but also can make audio VoIP calls when not plugged in to a PC.

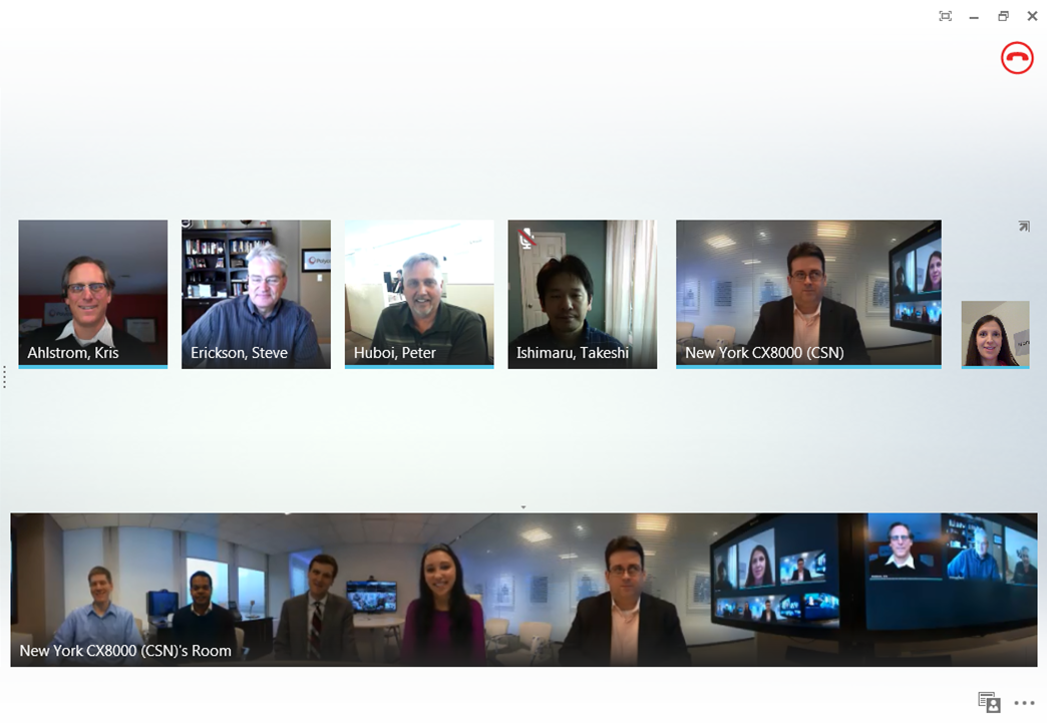
360-degree panoramic view from the Polycom CX5100 shown from a Skype for Business client in a video call
