= Héribrand III of Hierges =

Héribrand III of Hierges (Héribrand of Bouillon) (died 1117) was lord of Hierges and Castellan of Bouillon. He was the son of Héribrand II of Saussure, lord of Hierges and of Hedwige d'Orchimont.

He was a knight in the First Crusade in the army of Godfrey of Bouillon.

He married Hodierna of Rethel, daughter of Hugh I of Rethel and therefore sister of King Baldwin II of Jerusalem. His son Manasses was constable of the kingdom of Jerusalem from 1144 to 1152. He was buried in the church in Niverlée in present-day Belgium.

== Sources ==
- Héribrand of Bouillon, in A Database of Crusaders to the Holy Land, 1095-1149, Jonathan Riley-Smith, et al. (available on-line)
