= Doische =

Municipality in Wallonia, Belgium

Doische Dweche (Walloon)
- Municipality
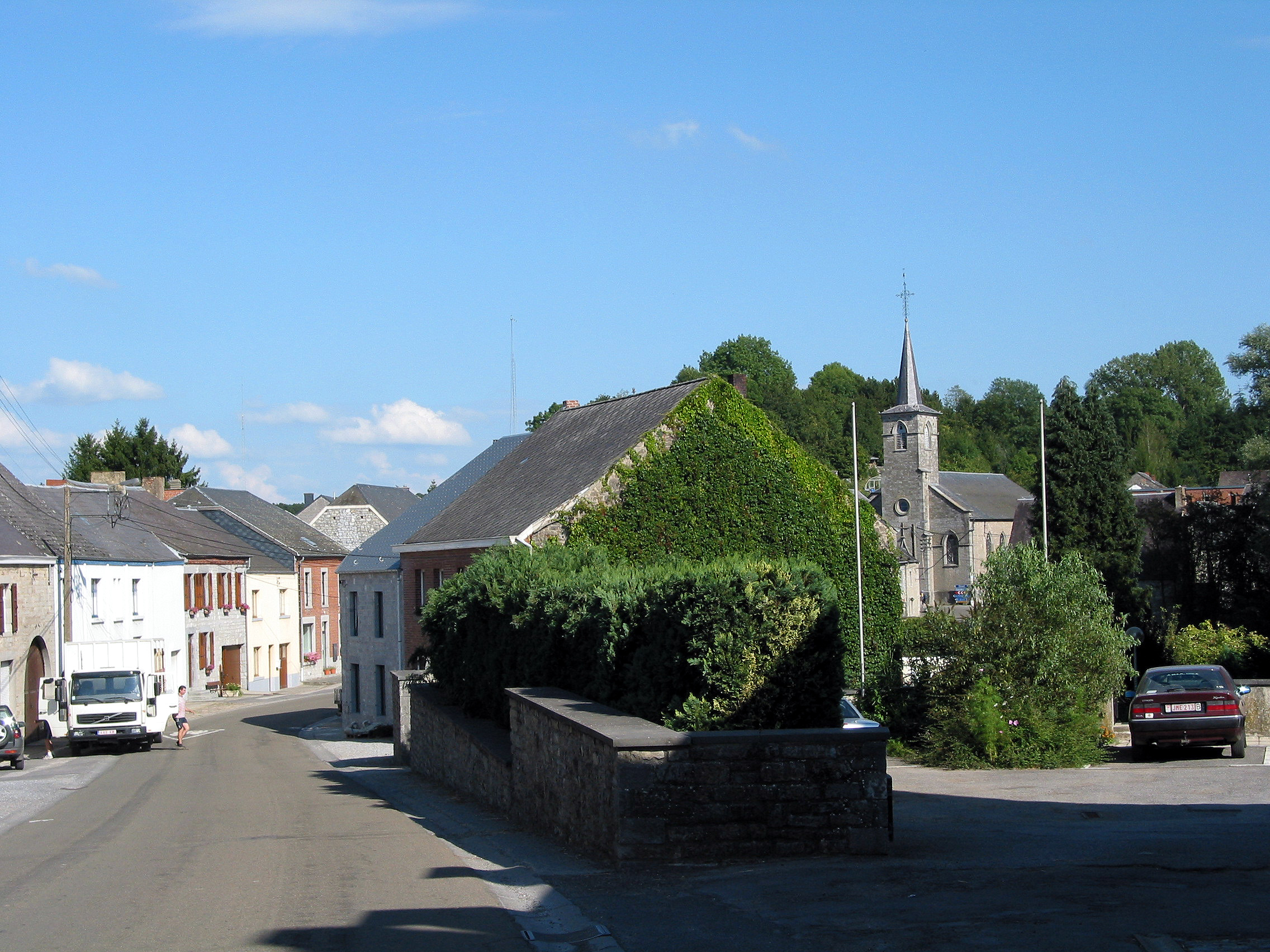

- Flag Coat of arms

- Location of Doische in the province of Namur
- Interactive map of Doische
- Location in Belgium
- Coordinates: 50°08′N 04°45′E
- Country: Belgium
- Community: French Community
- Region: Wallonia
- Province: Namur
- Arrondissement: Philippeville

Government
  - Mayor: Pascal Jacquiez (cdH)
  - Governing party: MR-IC

Area
  - Total: 84.12 km^{2} (32.48 sq mi)

Population (2018-01-01)
  - Total: 2,951
  - Density: 35.08/km^{2} (90.86/sq mi)
- Postal codes: 5680
- NIS code: 93018
- Area codes: 082
- Website: www.doische.be

Doische (French pronunciation: [dwaʃ]; Walloon: Dweche) is a municipality of Wallonia located in the province of Namur, Belgium.

On 1 January 2006 the municipality had 2,846 inhabitants. The total area is 84.02 km^{2}, giving a population density of 34 inhabitants per km^{2}.

The municipality consists of the following districts: Doische, Gimnée, Gochenée, Matagne-la-Grande, Matagne-la-Petite, Niverlée, Romerée, Soulme, Vaucelles, and Vodelée.

== Notable residents ==
- Philippe Buchez (1796-1865), historian, sociologist, and Utopian socialist politician
- Daniel Petit (1948- ), Canadian politician for the New Democratic Party

== See also ==
- List of protected heritage sites in Doische
