= Online Labour Index =

The Online Labour Index (OLI) is an economic indicator measuring the activity of the global online gig-economy. It was created and is administered by the researchers Otto Kässi, Vili Lehdonvirta, and Fabian Stephany, at the Oxford Internet Institute, University of Oxford.

The OLI monitors the demand and supply of work from the world's leading online gig-work internet platforms. The index has become an international reference for the measurement of the online freelance economy.

== Online Labour Observatory ==
Since 2021, the OLI is hosted on the Online Labour Observatory, a joint project of the International Labour Organisation and the Oxford Internet Institute.
