= Microsoft Office Live Meeting =

Microsoft Office Live Meeting is a discontinued commercial subscription-based web conferencing service operated by Microsoft. Live Meeting included software installed on client PCs and used a central server for all clients to connect to. The service was shut down on December 31, 2017. Microsoft's successor product is Skype for Business, which could be rolled out either on-premises or in the cloud.

== Overview ==
Microsoft Office Live Meeting was a separate piece of software which was installed on a user's PC (Windows Based Meeting Console). The software was made available for free download from the Microsoft website. There was also a Java-based console with antecedent release functionality. This also operated in Mac OS X and Solaris environments. The desktop client for Live Meeting was not compatible on the Mac in either Firefox or Safari 3.x; however, non-Windows users could connect to a web-based Live Meeting, if the meeting organizer published an HTTP URL to access the meeting.

Live Meeting was convergence software (i.e., allowing integration with an audio conference). Using the web users could control PSTN lines (mute all parties except themselves, eject parties, etc.). User accounts were grouped together in Conference Centers (a unique URL) starting with: www.livemeeting.com/cc/. . . or www.placeware.com/cc/. . . Users could join a Live Meeting session free of charge. Charges for Live Meeting were on an account basis. Supply of accounts was mostly done by resellers (Global Telecoms companies) which levied per minute or monthly standing charges.

With the introduction of Office 365 Office, Live Meeting customers were encouraged to move to Microsoft Lync Server.

== Live Meeting 2007 ==
With Live Meeting 2007 Microsoft offered both a hosted model for Microsoft Office Live Meeting 2007 as well as a CPE (customer premises equipment) solution, namely Office Communications Server 2007. In addition to Microsoft directly hosting Microsoft Office Live Meeting 2007, hosting partners also offered Microsoft Office Live Meeting 2007 as a fee-based service. Whether attendees used the Live Meeting service or the Office Communications Server 2007 (OCS 2007) to power their web conference, they were able to use the same client software.

New features included:

- Rich media presentations (incl. Windows Media and Flash)
- Live webcam video
- "Panoramic video" with Microsoft RoundTable
- Multi-party two-way VoIP audio
- PSTN and VoIP audio integration
- Active speaker indicator
- Public events page
- Advanced testing and grading
- High fidelity recordings
- Personal recordings
- Virtual Breakout Rooms
- "Handout" distribution (file transfer)

Live Meeting Web Access (MWA) was redesigned in this release to provide a user experience nearly identical to the new Windows-based Live Meeting client. One benefit was that Live Meeting Web Access was a Java applet and therefore ran on non-Windows operating systems such as Linux, Solaris, and MacOS.

The Live Meeting product was also intended to operate with the Polycom CX5000 (formerly known as the Microsoft RoundTable), a 360 degree video camera optimized to work with Microsoft Office Live Meeting 2007. One new feature included in this version allowed the Microsoft Office Live Meeting client to automatically switch the larger video window to the actively speaking participant. This auto-switch feature was not specific to the Polycom CX5000 product - it worked with any USB-based camera. The main advantage of the CX5000 was its 360 degree camera view, suitable for conference rooms with several participants. With specially designed microphones, the CX5000 was able to determine the location of the active speaker and then tell Microsoft Office Live Meeting which camera angle to focus on.

== History ==
Live Meeting was originally a separate company called PlaceWare. Microsoft acquired PlaceWare in 2003 to improve upon NetMeeting, its own webconferencing technology. Microsoft subsequently dropped development of NetMeeting.

== See also ==
- Comparison of office suites
- Web conferencing
- Comparison of web conferencing software
- Collaborative software
