= Ardennes and Eifel =

European mountain ranges

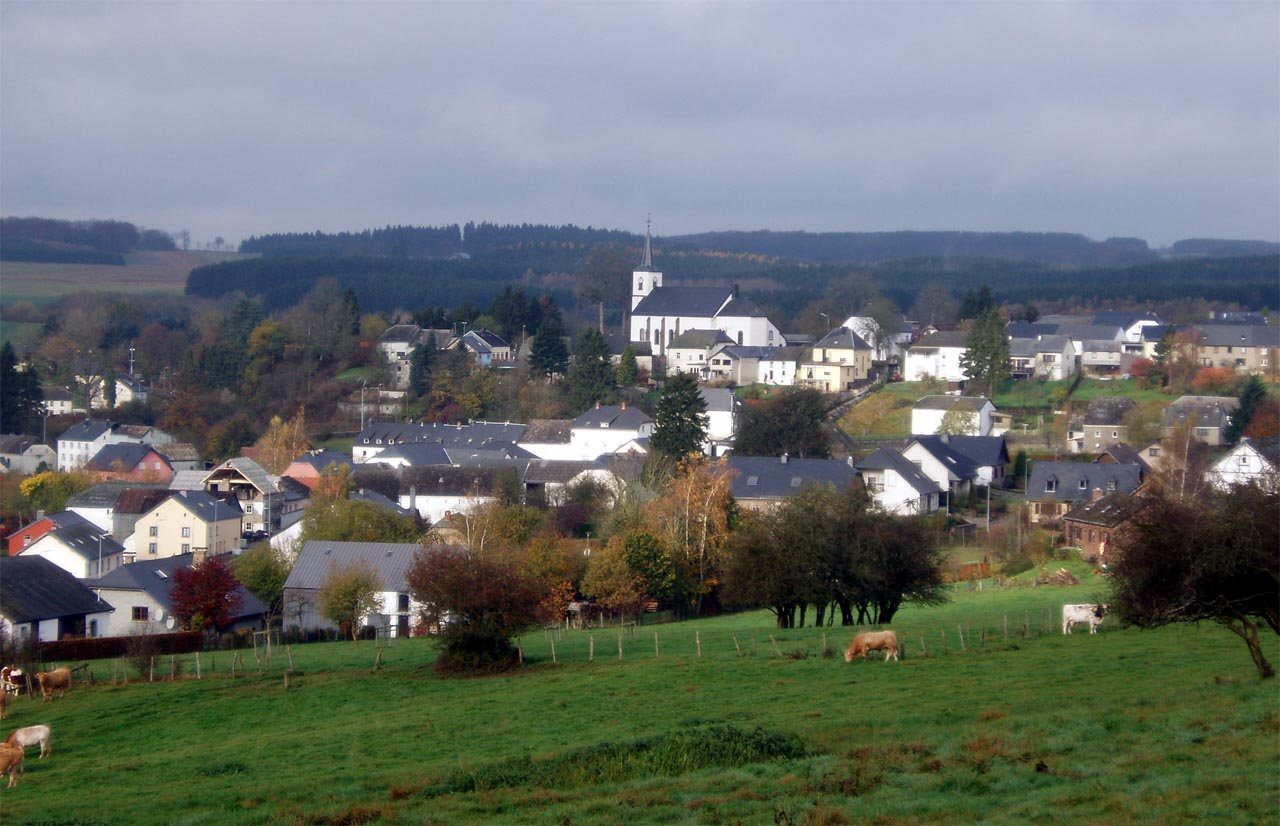
- A view at the Luxembourg commune of Weiswampach

Highest point
- Peak: Hohe Acht
- Elevation: 747 m (2,451 ft)

Dimensions
- Area: 16,500 km^{2} (6,400 mi^{2})

Geography
- Countries: Belgium (east), France (north), Germany (west) and Luxembourg (north)
- States: Champagne-Ardenne (F), Diekirch District (L), North Rhine-Westphalia (G), Rhineland-Palatinate (G) and Wallonia (B)
- Parent range: Rhenish Slate Mountains

Geology
- Orogeny: low mountains
- Rock type(s): slate, limestone, quartzite, sandstone, basalt

Ardennes and Eifel are mountain ranges in Europe that form part of the same volcanic field and also of the Rhenish Massif. These are mountains and hills composed of slate and limestone, and of an average altitude of 400 to 500 meters, with several summits reaching the 700 meters.

These mountain ranges are situated in western Europe. Their western starting point roughly begins where the Meuse river crosses the French-Belgian border. They stretch in a northeastern direction, covering eastern Belgium (Wallonia), northern Luxembourg and western Germany as far as the Rhine river between the cities of Bonn and Koblenz, and are bordered by the Moselle river on the south.

The very eastern part of Belgium (Belgian Eifel) and also the north of Luxembourg (Oesling) form a transitional area between the Ardennes on the left (French speaking) and the Eifel on the right (German speaking).

Ardennes and Eifel are thinly populated, abundant with forests, wildlife, and rivers carving deep valleys.

== See also ==
- Ardennes
- Eifel

== Maps ==
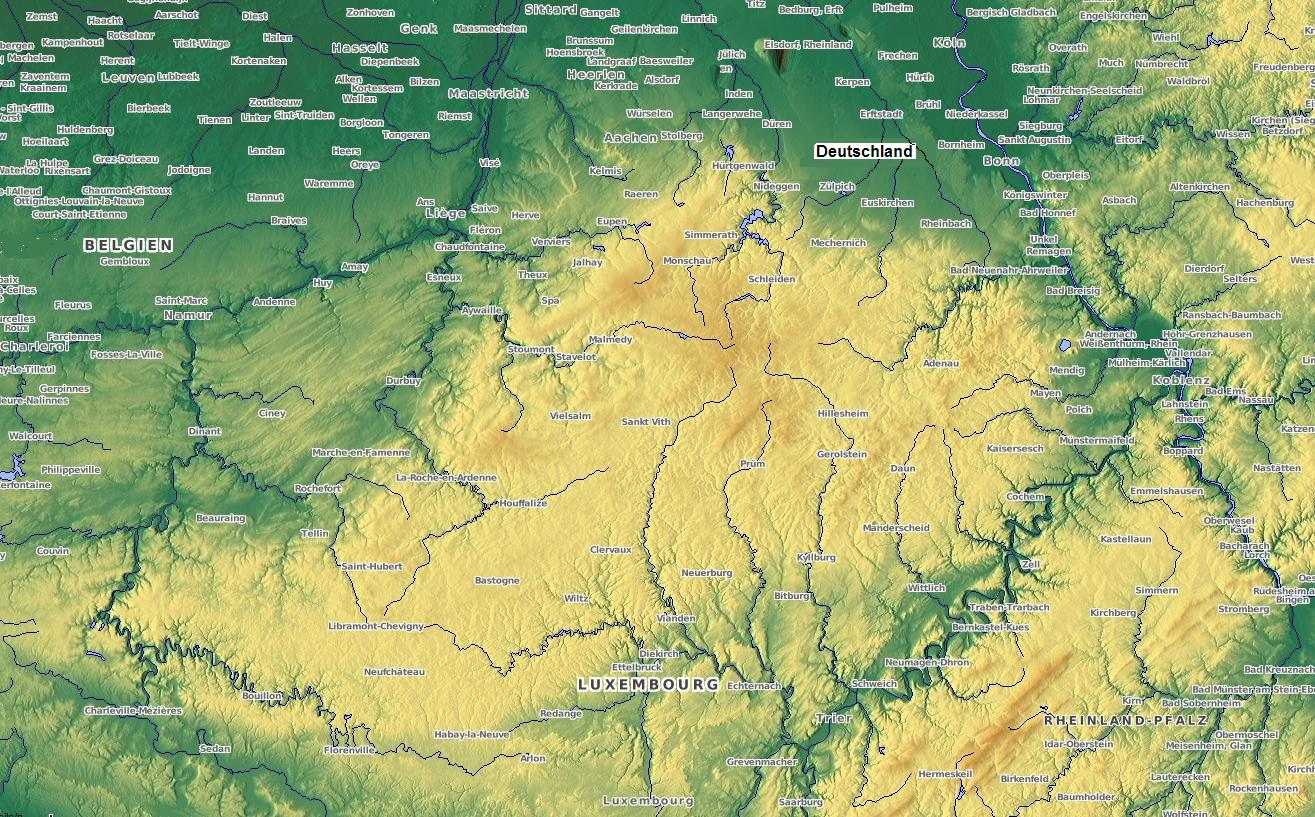
Ardennes and Eifel

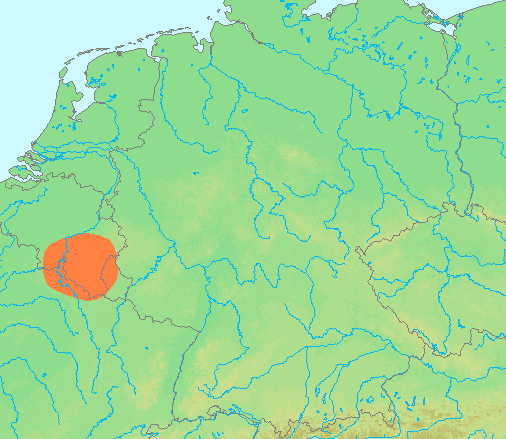
Location of the Ardennes

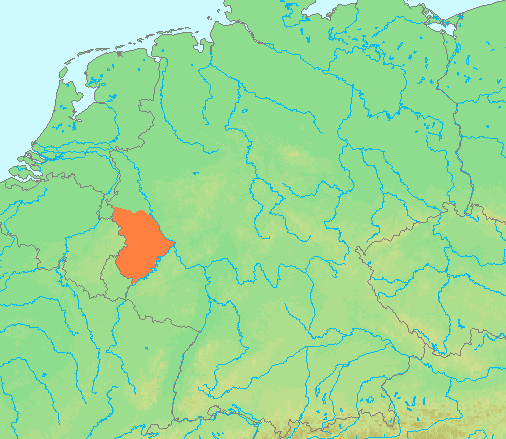
Location of the Eifel

== Photos ==
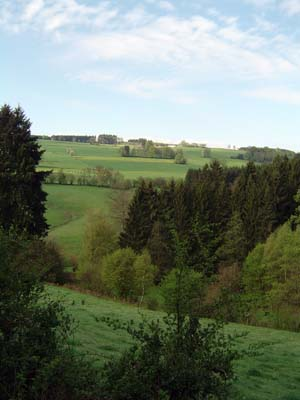
A view at the Ardennes near Stavelot

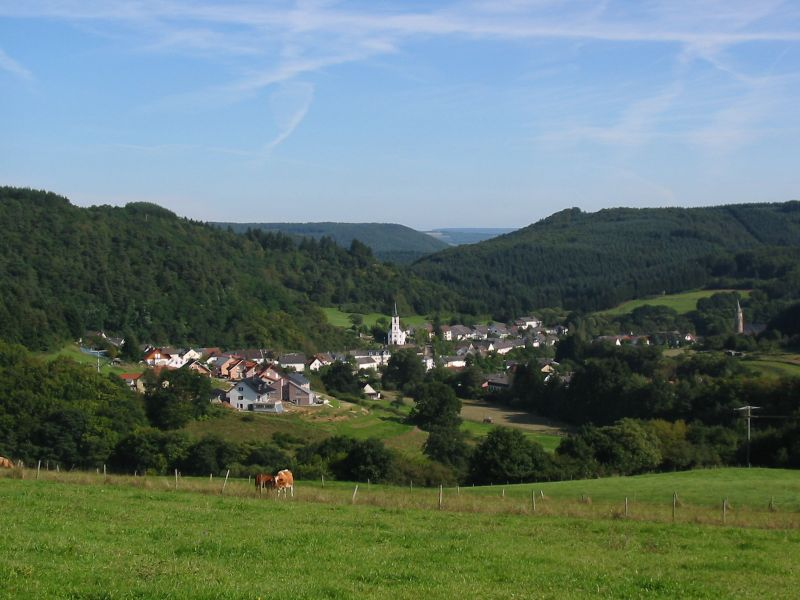
A view at the Eifel near Nürburg

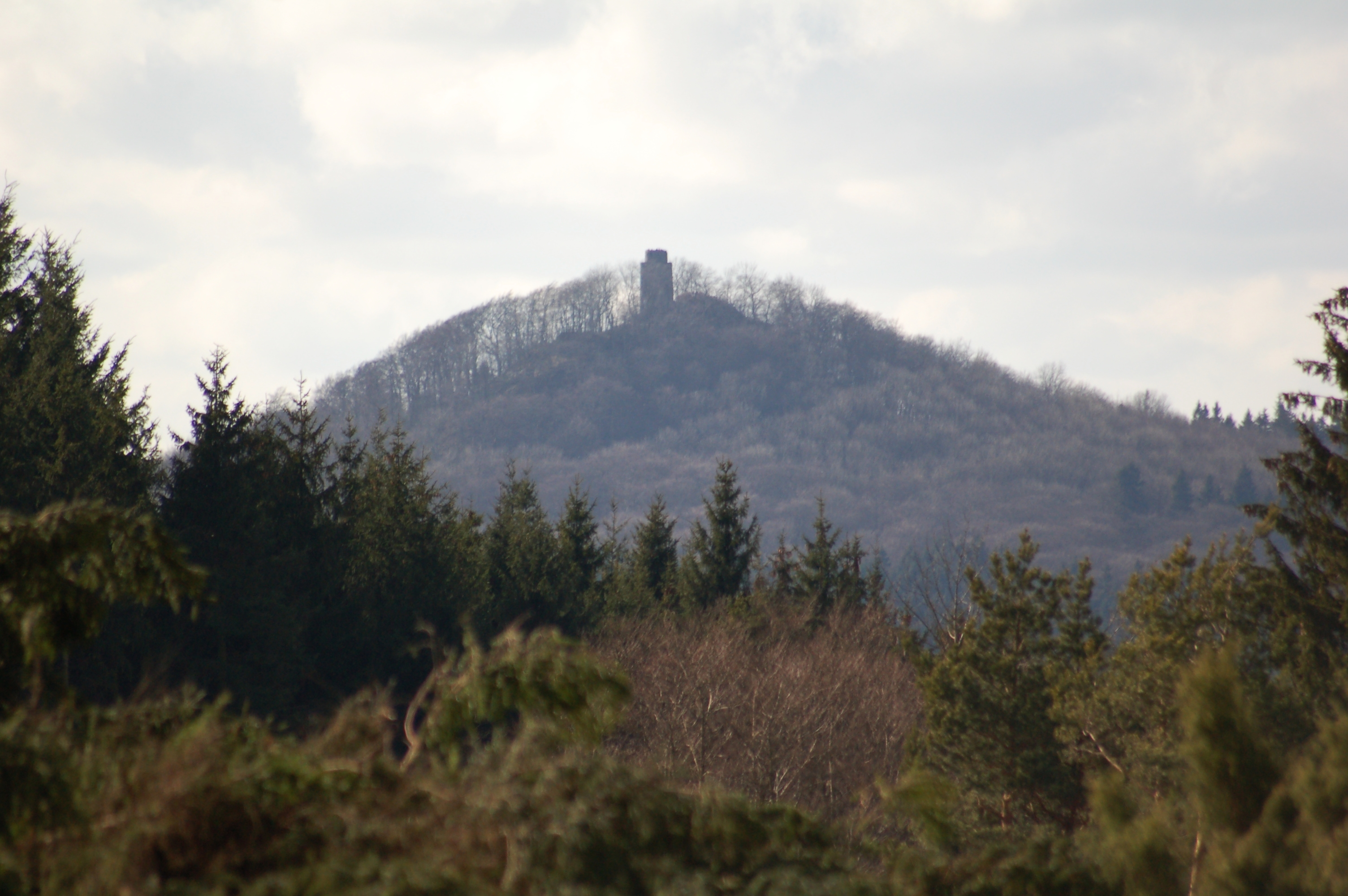
Hohe Acht, the highest summit of the Eifel

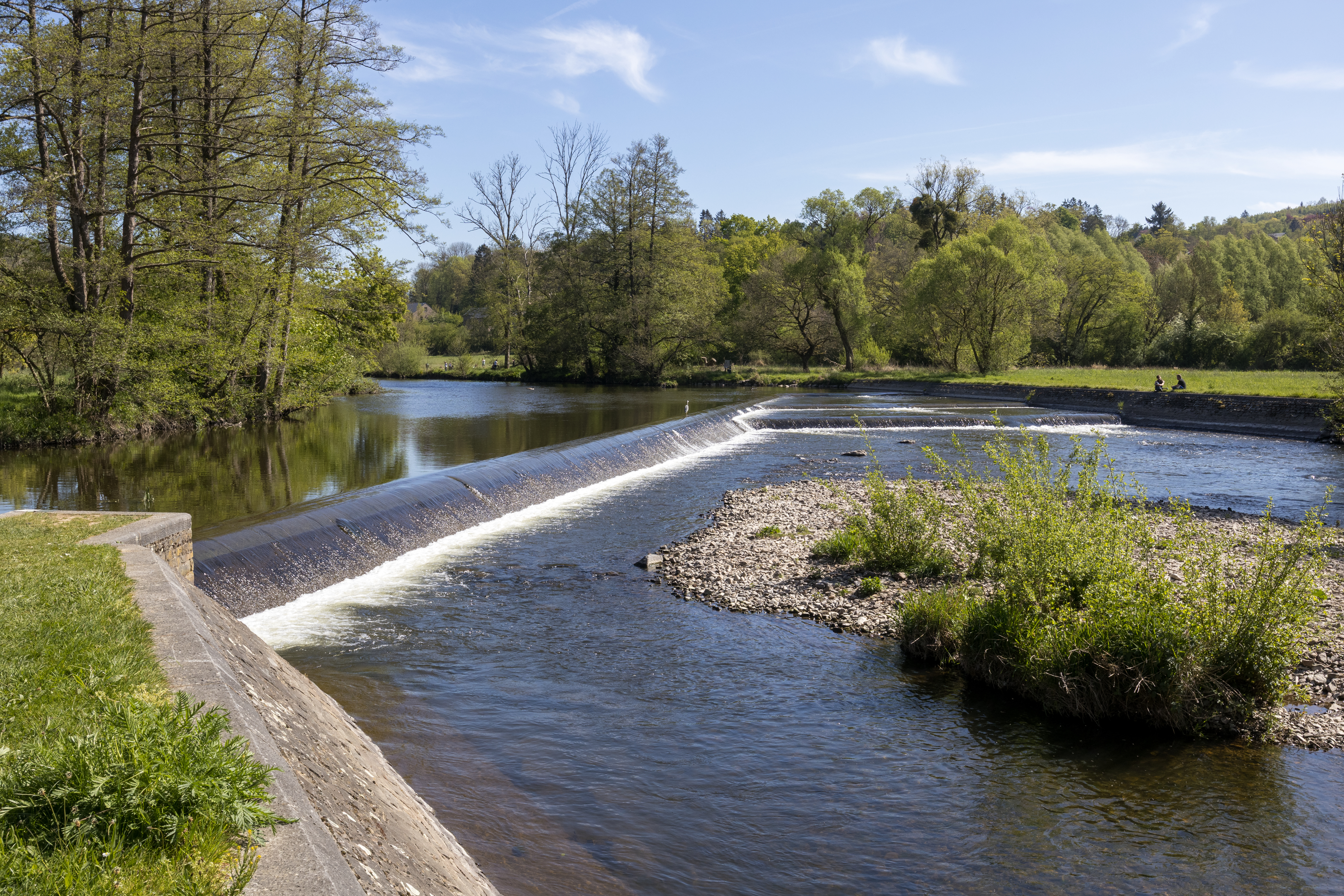
Ourthe river near Rendeux

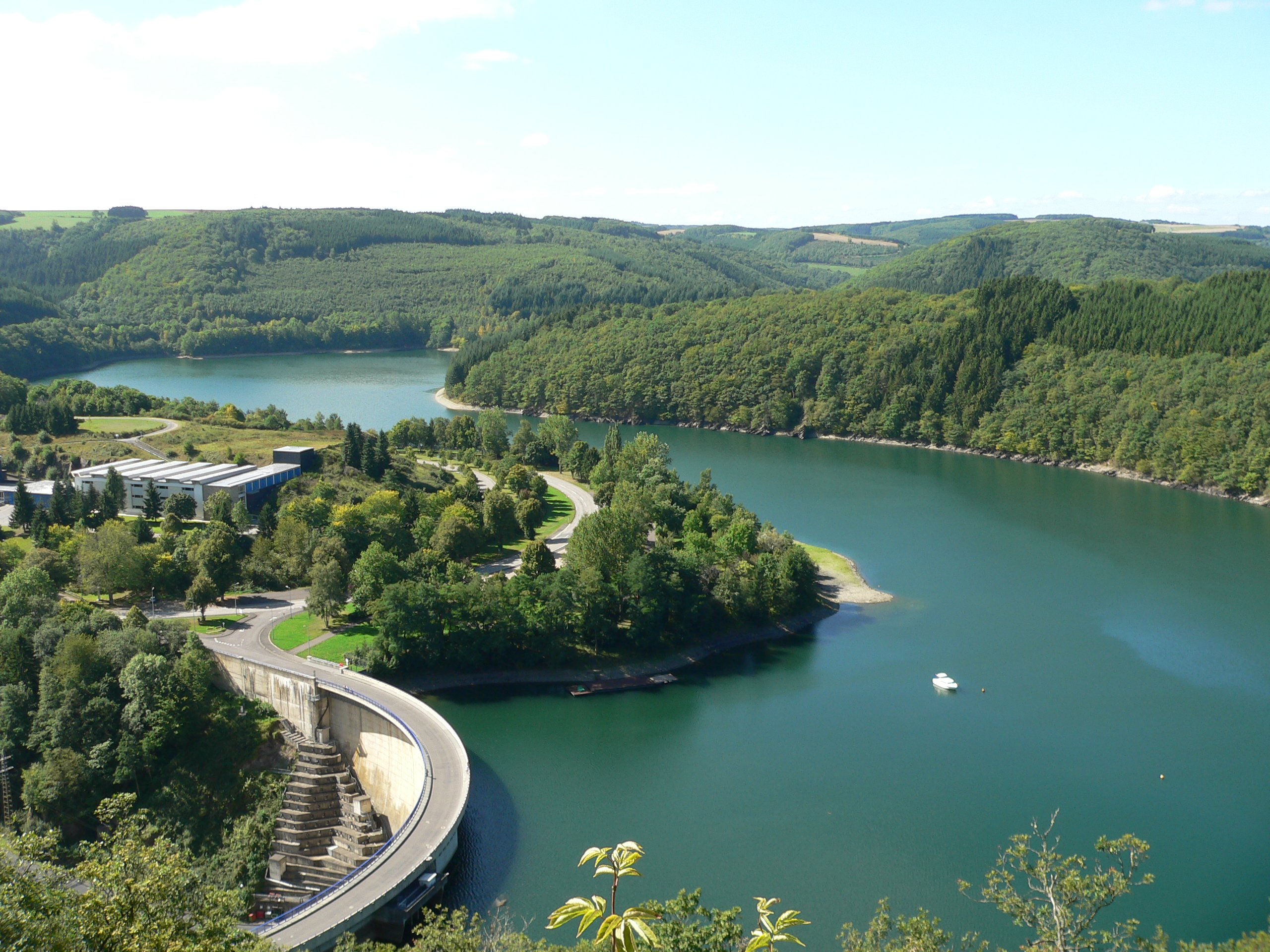
Upper Sûre Lake in Luxembourg

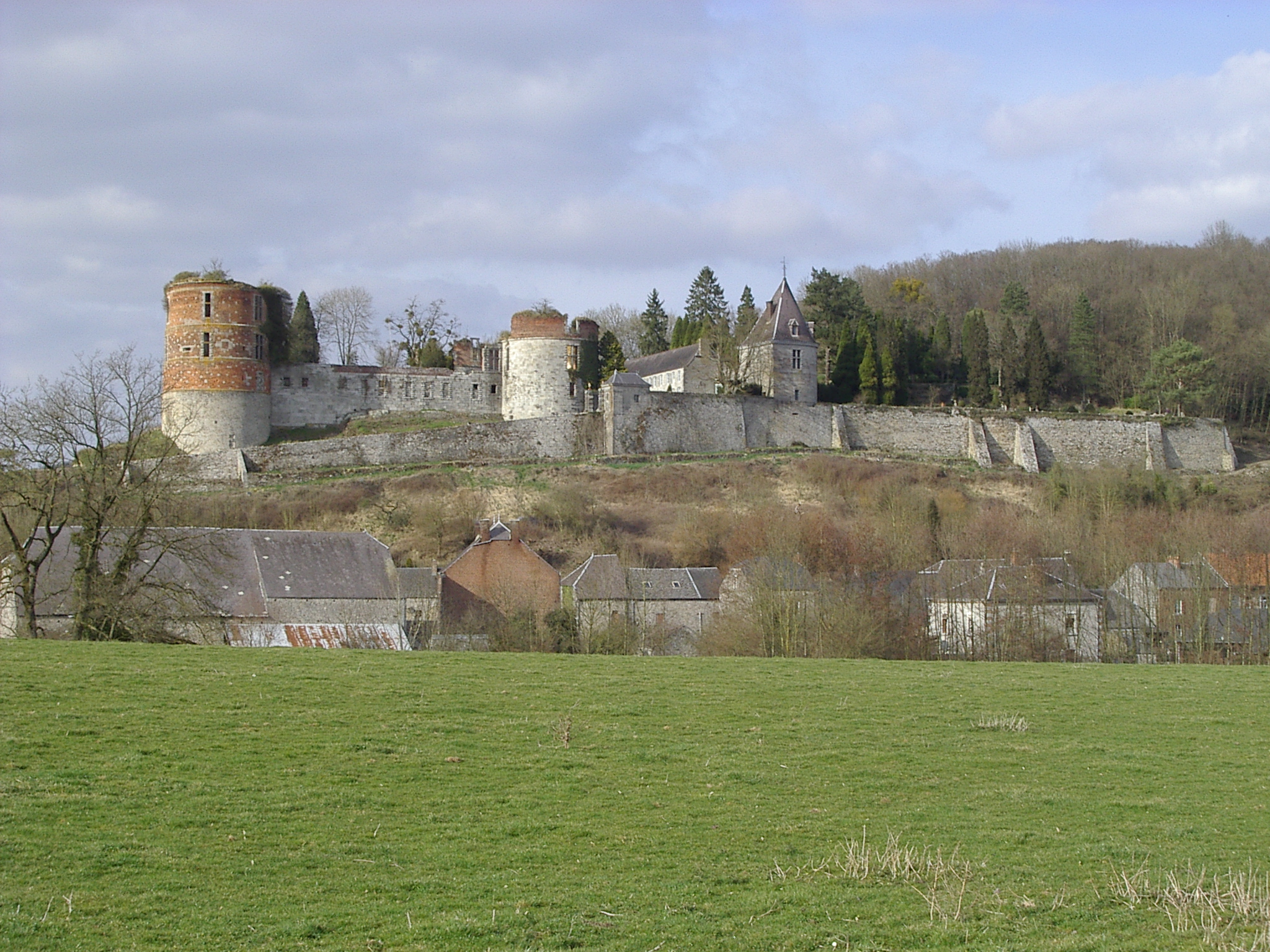
Château de Hierges in France

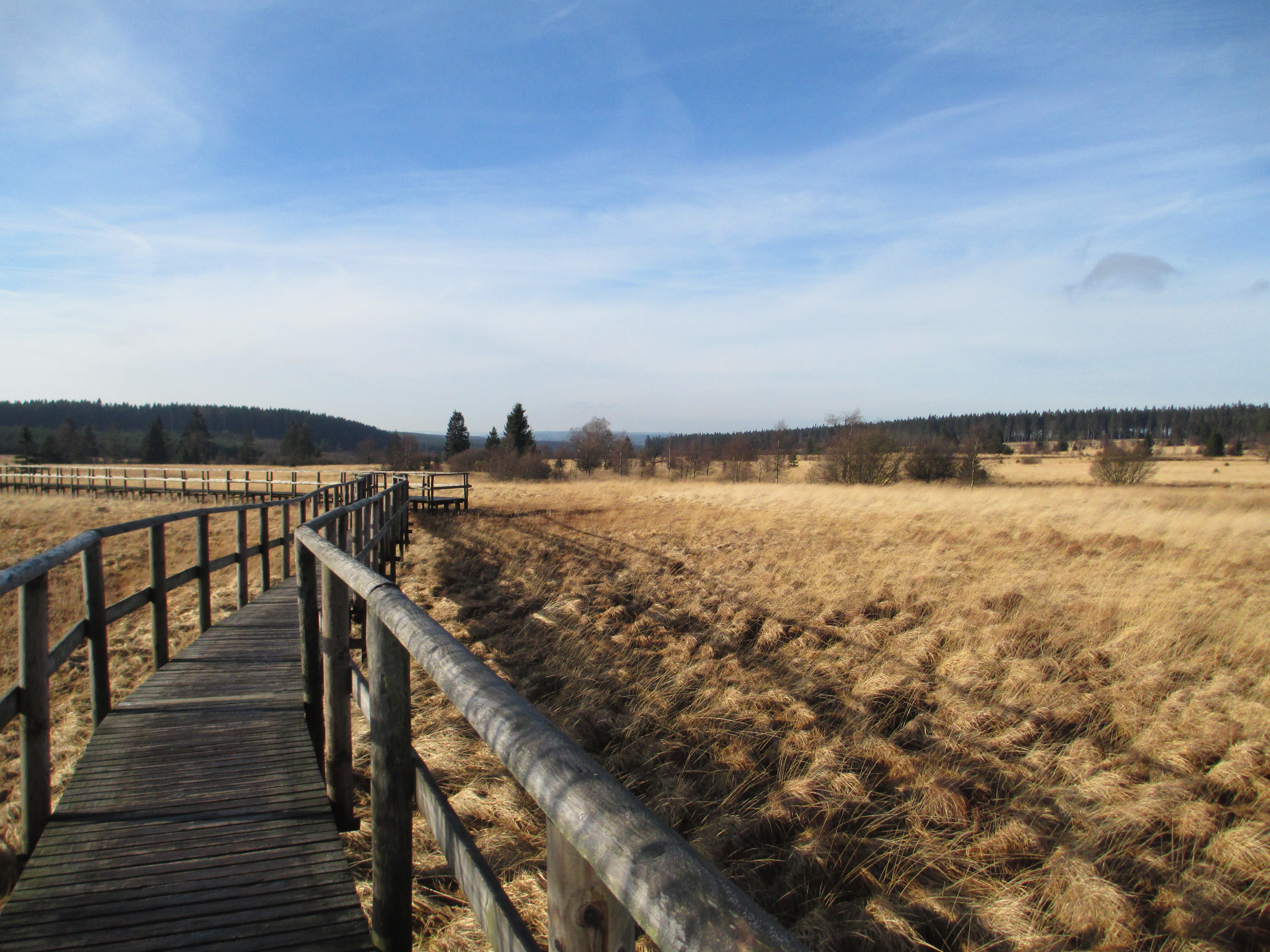
High Fens

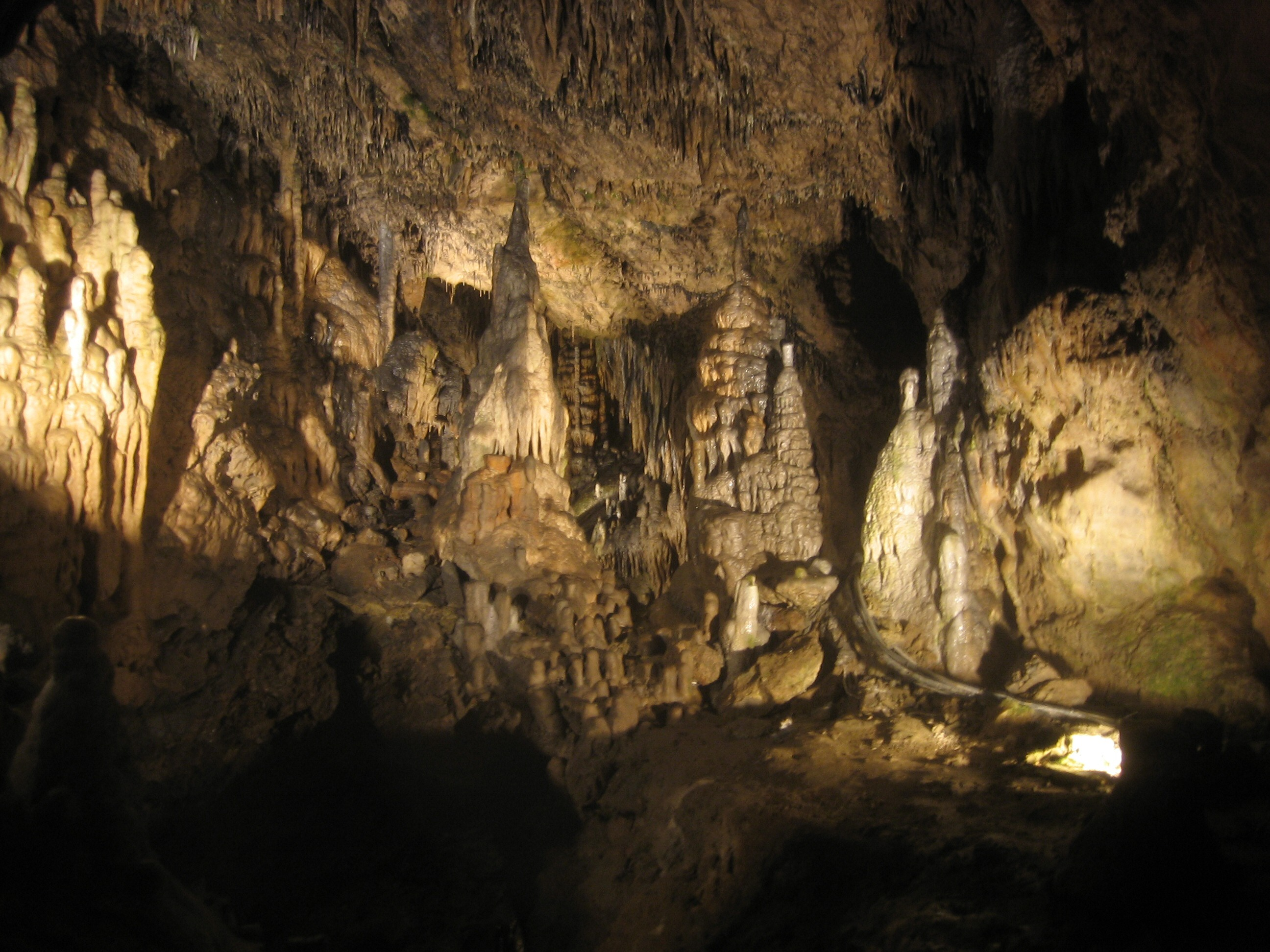
Caves of Han-sur-Lesse

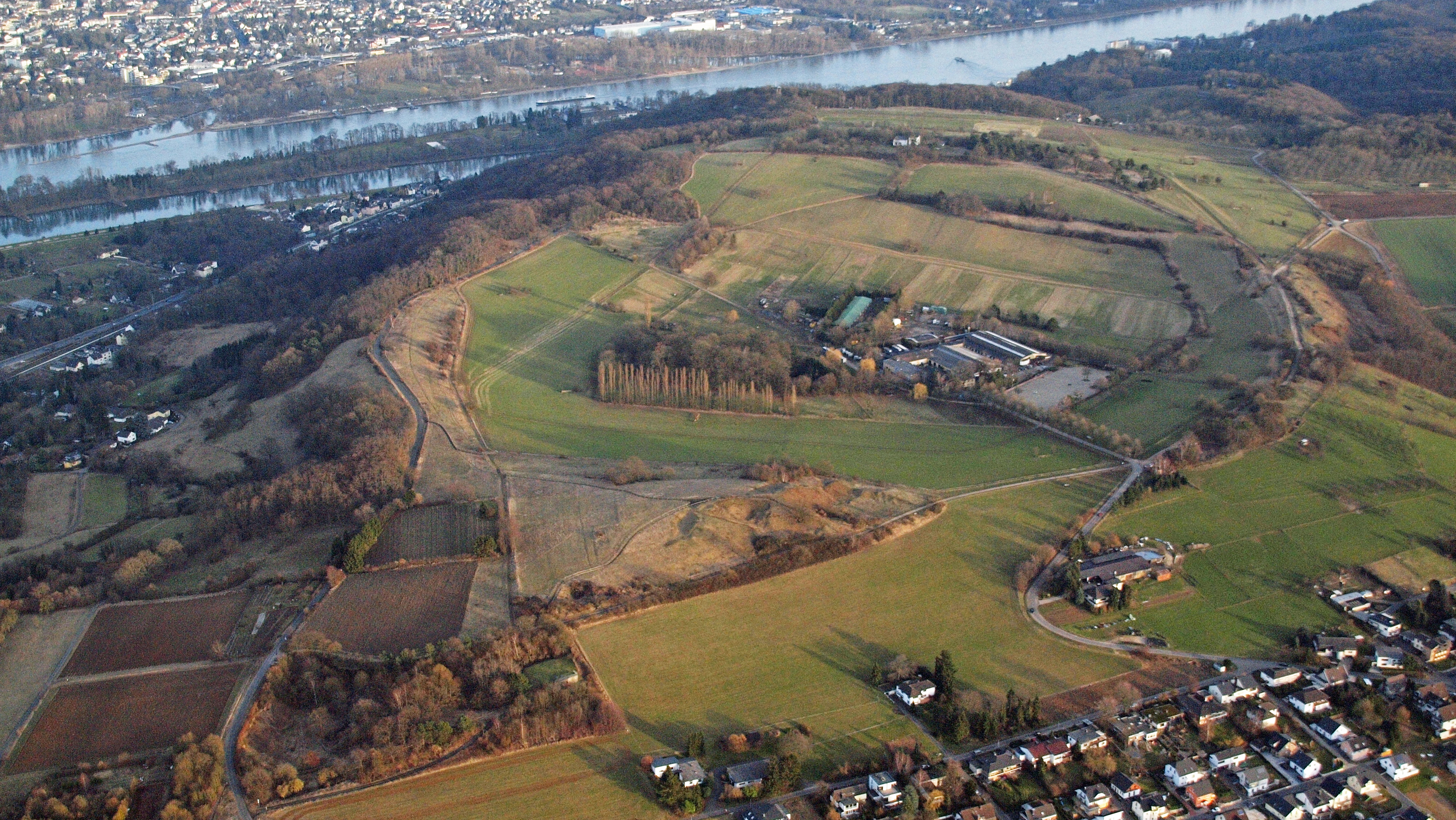
Rodderberg maar

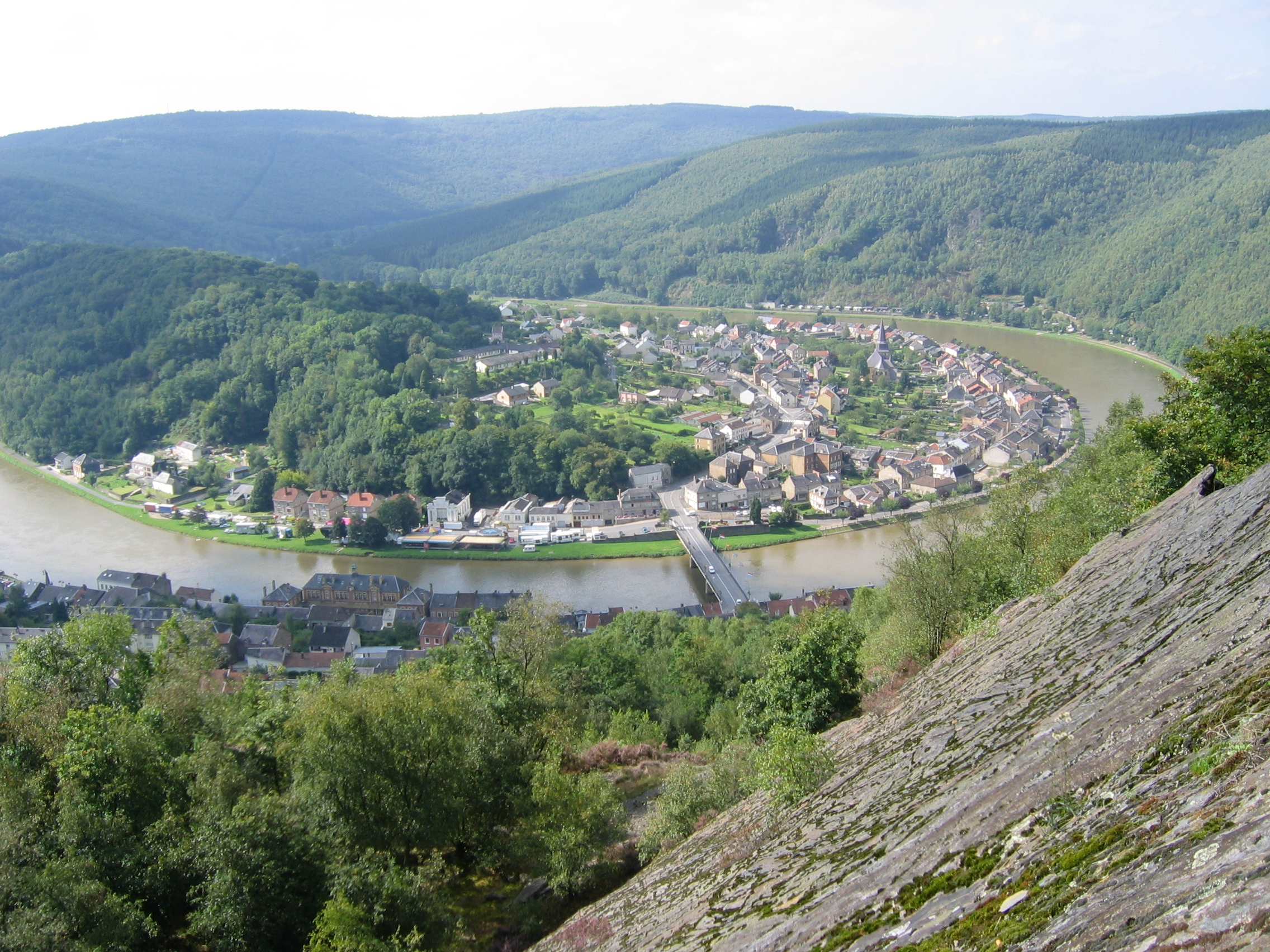
Meuse river at Monthermé
