= Elisa Saunalahti =

Finnish mobile phone operator & internet service provider

Saunalahti
- Company type: Private
- Industry: Telecommunications
- Founded: 1996
- Defunct: 31 December 2011 (as an independent company); 15 October 2014 (branding merged into Elisa)
- Headquarters: Finland
- Products: Telecommunication services
- Owner: Elisa

Saunalahti (previously Jippii) was a Finnish mobile phone operator and an internet service provider.

== History ==
The company was founded in 1996 when three middle-sized internet operators merged.

In 2009 the Helsinki Court of Appeal convicted Jippii leadership of using inside information when selling its own shares, accounting mistakes and too good information of the company finance to public in 2001. The case was brought back to the court in 2012 and all 26 convictions were overturned. The Finnish state was obliged to pay 4 million euros from the trial.

In 2005 Saunalahti merged with Elisa.

Icelandic-led Novator acquired a large share of the company in 2005. Subsequently Elisa acquired all stock and Saunalahti was delisted from the Helsinki Stock Exchange in the first half of 2006.

Elisa joined its marketing brands together as 15 October 2014, and marketing its telecommunications-services to private personal's, as the new joined Elisa-Saunalahti -brand name.
