= Pavel Curtis =

American software architect at Microsoft

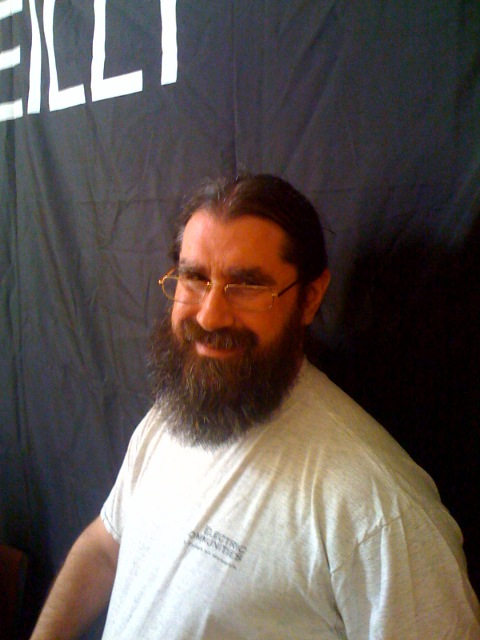
- Scientific career
- Fields: Computer science

Pavel Curtis is an American software architect at Microsoft who is best known for having founded and managed LambdaMOO, an online community.

In the mid- to late 1980s Curtis developed and taught parts of the computer science course at the Center for Talented Youth summer program.

Curtis was a member of the research staff at Xerox PARC from 1983 to 1996, where he worked in the areas of programming language design and implementation, programming environments, and online collaboration systems. He developed LambdaMOO from work initiated by Stephen White from 1990, during this period, enhancing the implementation of the MOO programming language.

Curtis left Xerox in 1997 to become a principal architect and co-founder of PlaceWare, a web-conferencing company that was acquired by Microsoft in 2003.

Outside work Curtis is now the sole proprietor of Pavel's Puzzles, a website selling mechanical puzzles, mostly designed by him. The website also features a column, "Adalogical Ænigmas", which features a large Nikoli-style logic puzzle every month.
