= Arden, Texas =

Ghost town in Texas

Coordinates: 31°26′38″N 100°46′01″W

Arden is a ghost town in Irion County, Texas, United States. Its population as of the 2000 United States census was only one. It was named after the Arden family, who claimed the area in 1885. With a post office established in 1890, and a school in 1892, the town grew to a population of 130 by 1947. However, drought and low cotton prices eventually suffocated the city, and most businesses were abandoned by 1966.
