= Jippii =

Extinct global mobile and web portal

Jippii was an international mobile and web portal. The service was opened in 1999 as a web portal of Saunalahti Group with the name Saunalahti.fi. Saunalahti Group and its web portal was renamed Jippii in late 2000 (Jippii Group Oyj) and it grew during the dot-com bubble to an international web service. During the early 2000s the Finnish Jippii-portal was the biggest or second biggest Finnish web medium. Jippii Group reverted its name back to Saunalahti Group in 2003 and corporatized its mobile entertainment / web portal activities into Jippii Mobile Entertainment Oy. In July 2004 Saunalahti Group sold the aforementioned company and Jippii portal to the British Itouch company. In 2007 Itouch itself was bought by Buongiorno, an Italian company. Jippii portal has been discontinued around 2010.

== See also ==
- Saunalahti
