= Arden: The World of Shakespeare =

21st-century partially complete educational computer game

Arden: The World of Shakespeare was a proposed massively multiplayer online game to be created by a team led by Edward Castronova of Indiana University.

The project was sponsored by a $250,000 MacArthur Foundation grant. The game was intended for experimental economics (and potentially other social science experiments), in addition to teaching players about the works of William Shakespeare. It was released in incomplete form as a plugin to the Neverwinter Nights game due to lack of funds and dissatisfaction with the gameplay.
