= Hierges Castle =

French castle

Coordinates: 50°06′21″N 4°44′26″E

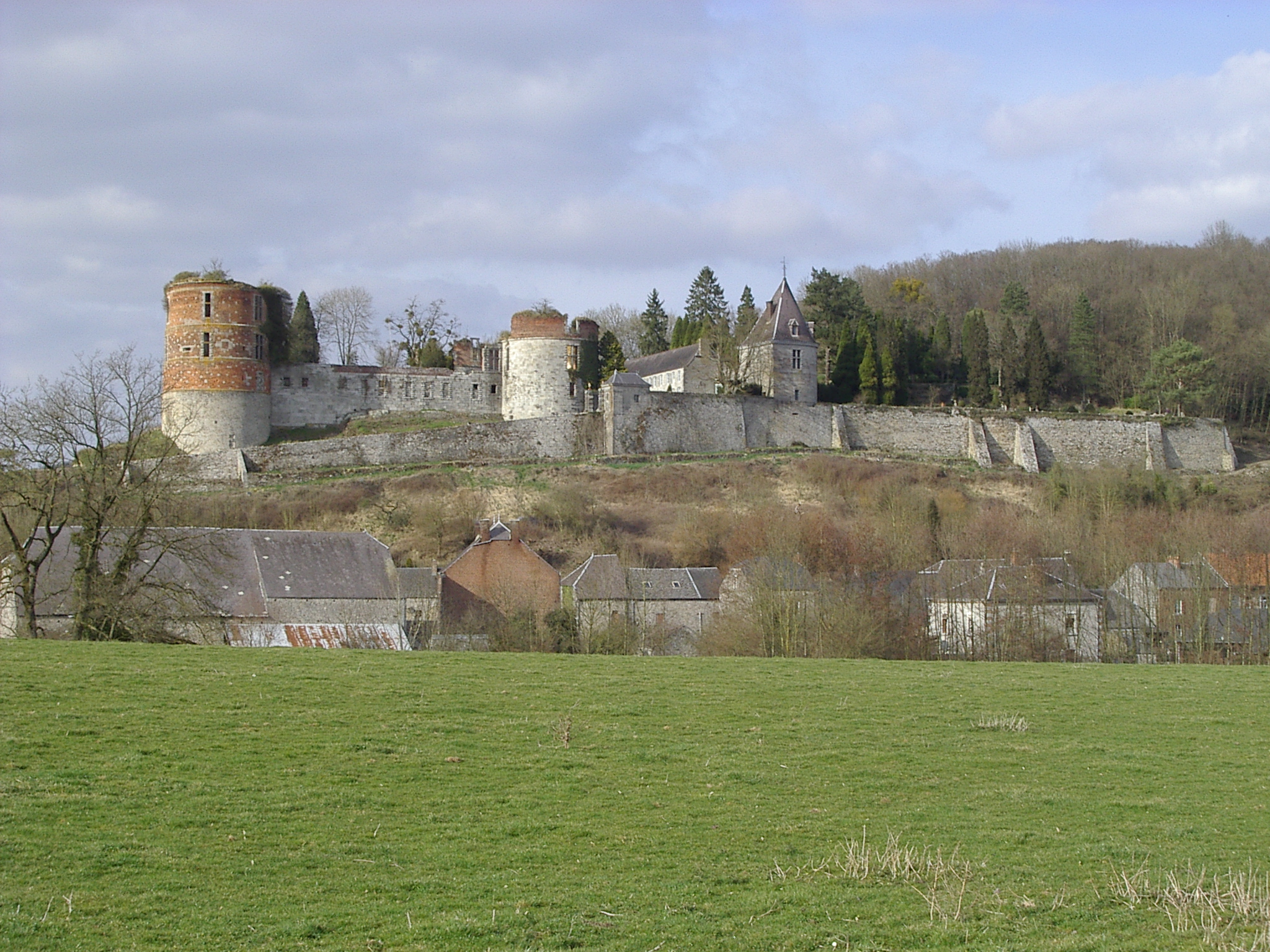
Château de Hierges

Hierges Castle (French: Château de Hierges) is a partially ruined castle in the commune of Hierges in the Ardennes département of France. It is privately owned and has been listed since 1980 as a monument historique by the French Ministry of Culture.

== History ==
The castle, originally called Château de Jerusalem (Castle of Jerusalem) was built on the site of a castrum whose origins date back to the 9th century, when the seigneurie of Hierges was part of the property of the house of Ardenne. At the time of the Crusades, the fortress of Hierges was given to the Prince-Bishopric of Liège and, in the 12th century, the castle was destroyed.

The castle was rebuilt in the 16th century, starting in 1560, with more comfort and openings for firearms.

In the 18th century the former common and the dovecote were added.

The castle was assaulted by revolutionaries in 1792 and destroyed by fire on 18 November 1793.

== Architecture ==
Of this Meuse-style Renaissance castle, there remain the curtain walls and three large round partially ruined towers, constructed in red brick and blue stone. The fourth covered tower, semi-circular in blue stone from Givet, is inhabited by the current owner.

On the towers, gun emplacements provided for mutual defence by cross fire. Some windows have cross mullions.

The exterior gardens have been restored to present the appearance they would have had during the Renaissance.

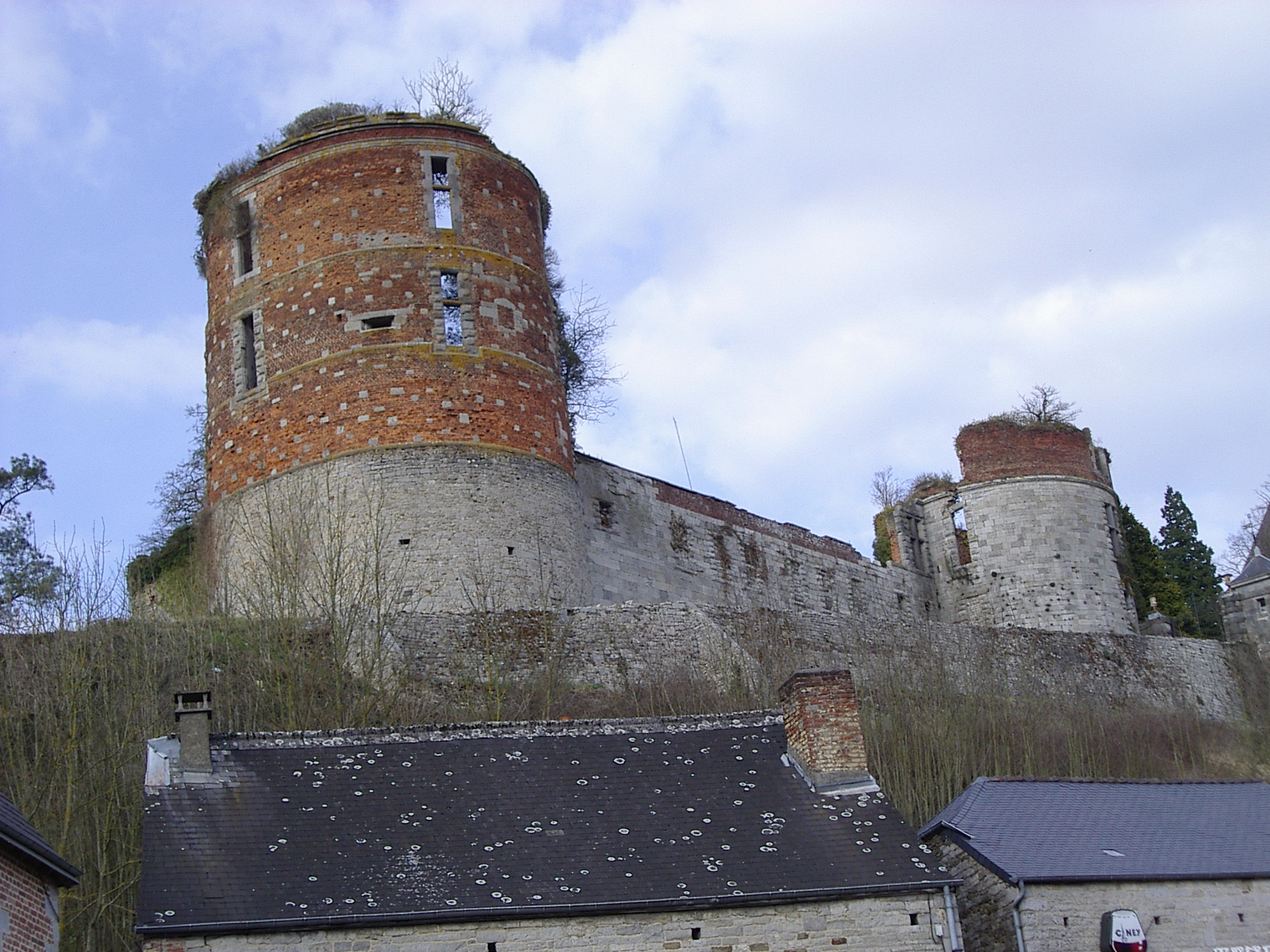
Towers

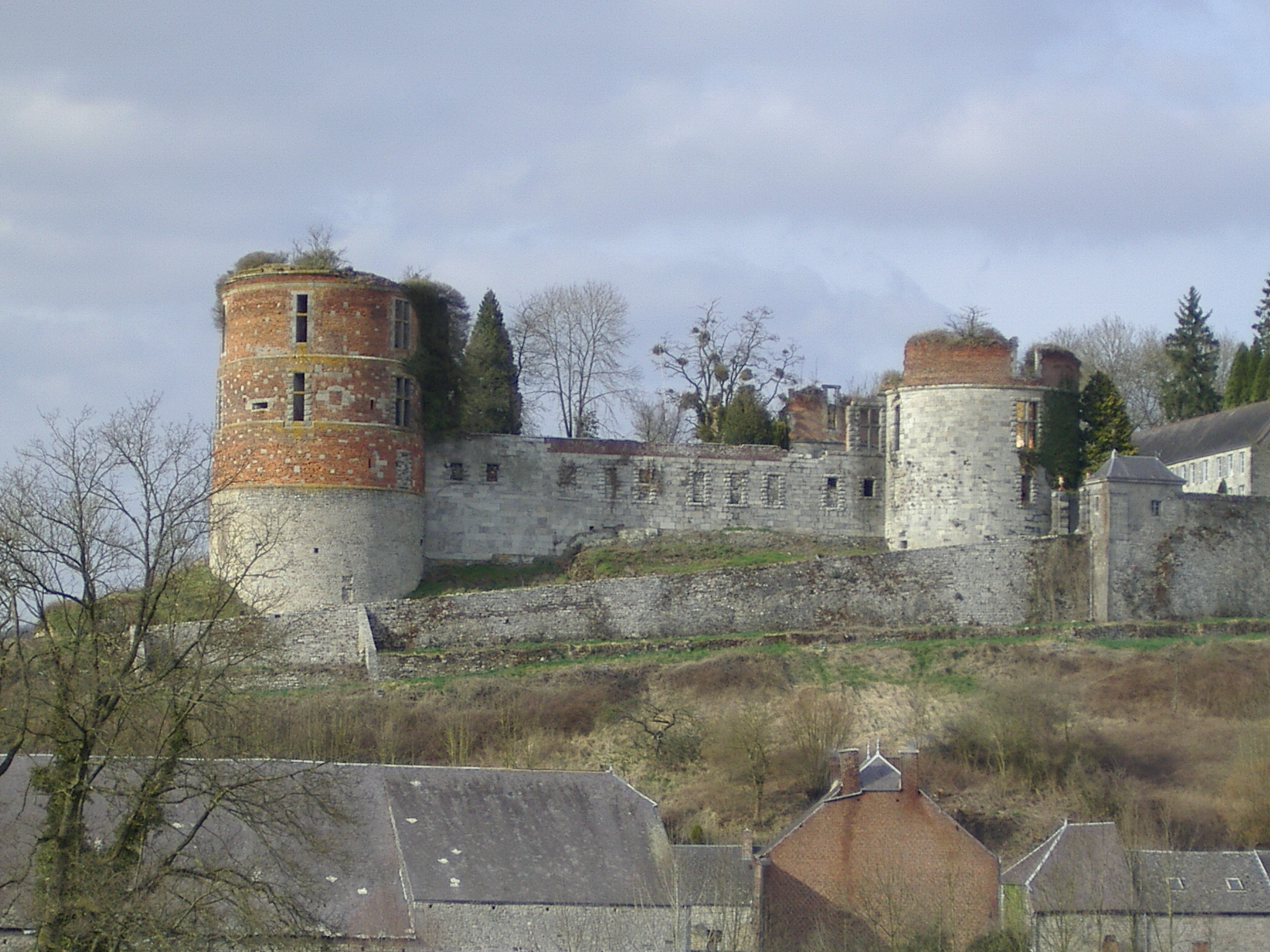

== Historic persons linked to the castle ==
- Héribrand II de Hierges, lord of Hierges died in 1117, was the son of Héribrand I of Saussure, lord of Hierges and Hedwige d'Orchimont. He married Hodierna of Jerusalem, sister of King Baldwin II of Jerusalem and had a son, Manassès, who was made Constable of the Kingdom of Jerusalem from 1144 to 1152.
- Mélusine of Hierges
- Albert II of Hierges

== Legends ==
=== Mélusine of Hierges ===
The castle was built in a single night by the famous fairy Mélusine and has 365 windows.

Mélusine of Hierges, also known as Sybilla of Lusignan, the future Queen of Jerusalem, was a direct descendant of Mélusine (the eldest of the line still carries the name of the illustrious ancestor). Her father was Manasses of Hierges. She married an insignificant husband, Guy of Lusignan. She was châtelaine of Samson, where she took part in battles to defend the castle. According to some sources, she died of plague in 1190 before Saint John of Acre, or in 1187 in the lands of Samson.

=== The Ladies of Meuse ===
During the First Crusade, three knights who were sons of the lord of Hierges entrusted the guard of the castle to their wives who, unfaithful during their husbands' absence and wanting to throw themselves into the water on their return, were changed into stone, becoming the "Ladies of the Meuse". The site includes three large rocks which overlook the Meuse at Laifour.

== See also ==
- List of castles in France

== Bibliography ==
- Jacques Henri Pirenne. "La Seigneurie d'Hierges au Moyen-Âge". La Principauté de Chimay. Bruxelles: éditions Les Editeurs d’art associés, éditions d'art Lucien de Meyer.
- Jean-Marie Pérouse de Montclos, ed. (1995). Le guide du Patrimoine: Champagne-Ardenne. Paris: Hachette. p. 193. ISBN 978-2010209871.
