= LambdaMOO =

1990 text-based virtual world

- Developers: Pavel Curtis, project community
- Publisher: Xerox PARC
- Engine: MOO
- Platform: Platform independent (Telnet)
- Release: 1990
- Genre: Social MUD (MOO)
- Mode: Multiplayer

LambdaMOO (Note: Sometimes written as LambdaMoo, with lowercase instead of capital letter O's.) is an online community of the variety called a MOO. It is the oldest active MOO.

LambdaMOO was founded in 1990 by Pavel Curtis at Xerox PARC. Now hosted in the state of Washington, it is operated and administered entirely on a volunteer basis. Guests are allowed, and membership is free to anyone with an e-mail address.

LambdaMOO gained some notoriety when Julian Dibbell wrote a book called My Tiny Life describing his experiences there. Over its history, LambdaMOO has been highly influential in the examination of virtual-world social issues.

== Usage ==
As is typical for the genre, LambdaMOO is accessed with the Telnet protocol (Note: The address is telnet://lambda.moo.mud.org:8888.) which allows users to send commands and receive text in response from the server. It sends a written description of the virtual area or room where the user is located. From there, the user can specify a direction to travel in the virtual world.

Users can see one another (Note: The server describes others coming and going to the area, and includes them in the area's written description.) in the virtual world and interact. If a user named Lynn types in quotes "So what's up?" into her terminal, everyone nearby will read "Lynn says 'So what's up?'" appearing on their screens. Lynn could also describe herself performing an action – by typing a command prefixed with a colon such as :eyes the crowd warily, her peers will be shown "Lynn eyes the crowd warily". Users may page one another for distance (Note: When users are at a distance in the context of the virtual world.) communication. Users also interact with the virtual environment; for example, in the presence of a cookie platter, the server will reply to the command eat cookies with a message indicating that the user has taken and eaten a cookie, including a description of what it tastes like. Other commands like take or give would also be applicable to objects like cookies.

== Setting ==
LambdaMOO's virtual world is centered on a digital recreation of Pavel Curtis's California home. A coat closet serves as the spawn point leading to the living room, an important social organ of the house. The house contains functioning appliances and can be explored in its entirety, even including the ductwork, hidden rooms and an underground complex.

The neighborhood immediately surrounding the house can also be explored, though the hazardous edge of the world (Note: Falling off of the edge will disable one's user account.) is a short distance away. In addition, certain ornaments throughout the house can be entered to visit entirely different areas, such as an Alpine village in a snow globe or a hotel game piece on a Monopoly board. The world is user-generated.

After visiting the real-world house, LambdaMOO user Julian Dibbell described it as "rearranged, as when a memory from waking life becomes a parody of itself when you're asleep." Judy Anderson, who lived in the real house, "felt at home" in the digital version.

== Development ==
LambdaMOO has its roots in the 1978–1980 work by Roy Trubshaw and Richard Bartle to create and expand the concept of Multi-User Dungeon (MUD) – virtual communities. Around 1987–1988, the expansion of the global Internet allowed more users to experience the MUD. Pavel Curtis at Xerox PARC noted that they were "almost exclusively for recreational purposes." Curtis determined to explore whether the MUD could be non-recreational. He developed LambdaMOO software to run on the LambdaMOO server, which implements the MOO programming language. This software was subsequently made available to the public. Several starter databases, known as cores, are available for MOOs; LambdaMOO itself uses the LambdaCore database. The "Lambda" name is from Curtis's own username on earlier MUD systems.

LambdaMOO can refer to the software, the server, or the community of users.

== Governance ==
The manner in which LambdaMOO has been governed, and how its governance has changed over time, has attracted academic attention.

Typically, MOOs (and MUDs broadly) are governed by administrators called "wizards" (or "janitors"). Wizards have elevated permissions in the virtual world including the authority to block others from continuing to access it. In MUDs including LambdaMOO, the act of banning a user is called "newting" or "toading", (Note: A LambdaMOO wizard describes the difference: "toading leaves a scar and newting doesn't.") and includes the character's transformation into a helpless amphibian as a final act of public humiliation.

Originally, wizards enforced the virtual world's code of conduct ad hoc. Frustrated with the growing workload, Pavel Curtis announced in December 1992 that wizards would from then on answer only to technical affairs and not social matters. Under this policy, called the "New Direction", the responsibility would be moved onto the community itself.

=== The Bungle affair ===
Responding to a March 1993 sexual misconduct incident was a crisis for the newly self-governing LambdaMOO community. Through a user-generated object, a user named "Mr. Bungle" was able to describe actions on behalf of others. In a public space, he used this capability to force two women to perform various sexual and masochistic acts with him and each other, distressing and humiliating them.

The community, which had not formed any decision-making body in the first four months of the New Direction, was unable to form a consensus about how to proceed. Ultimately, a wizard acted unilaterally in toading Mr. Bungle.

=== 1993–1996 user democracy and arbitration system ===
While most MOOs are run by administrative fiat, in summer of 1993 LambdaMOO implemented a petition/ballot mechanism, allowing the community to propose and vote on new policies and other administrative actions. A petition may be created by anyone eligible to participate in politics (those who have maintained accounts at the MOO for at least 30 days), can be signed by other players, and may then be submitted for administrative 'vetting'. Once vetted, the petition has a limited time to collect enough signatures to become valid and be made into a ballot. Ballots are subsequently voted on; those with a 66% approval rating are passed and will be implemented. This system suffered quite a lot of evolution and eventually passed into a state where wizards took back the power they'd passed into the hands of the people, but still maintain the ballot system as a way for the community to express its opinions.

== Community ==
The population of LambdaMOO numbered close to 10,000 around 1994, with over 300 actively connected at any time.

== See also ==
- FurryMUCK
- The WELL
