= Soulme =

Soulme Soûme (Walloon)
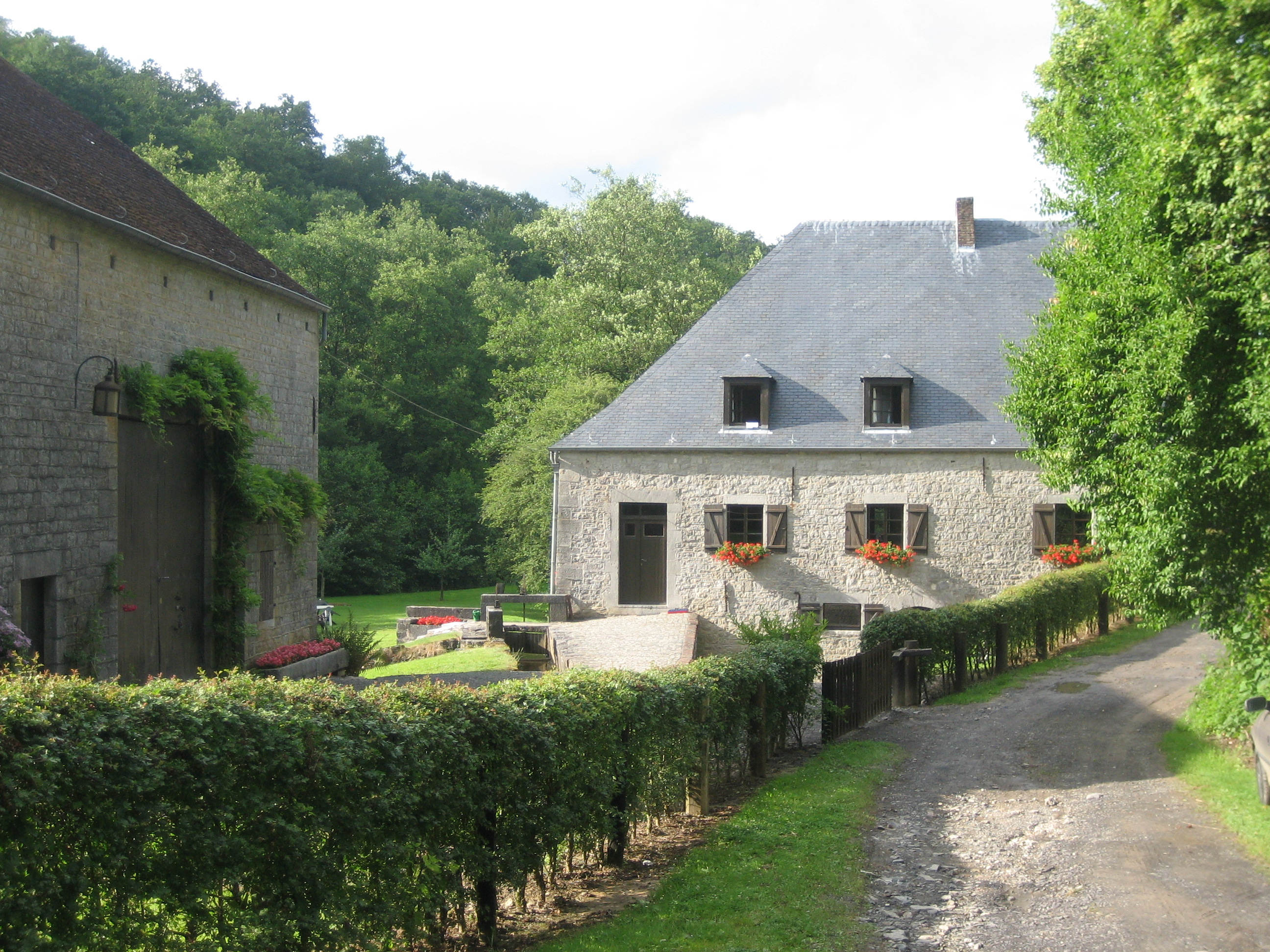
- Soulme

- Location within Belgium Location within Europe
- Coordinates: 50°11′20″N 04°44′09″E
- Country: Belgium
- Region: Wallonia
- Province: Namur
- Municipality: Doische

Soulme (Walloon: Soûme) is a village in Wallonia and a district of the municipality of Doische, located in the province of Namur, Belgium.

The village consists of about 50 houses surrounding the village church. Several of the buildings are from the 18th and 19th centuries. The location has been inhabited at least since Gallo-Roman times, however, as indicated by archaeological discoveries. The first time the village was mentioned in written sources was 1057. During the early Middle Ages, the village belonged to the Abbey of Florennes. The village church was built by monks from the abbey; it still retains its Romanesque tower from this time. The nave of the church is from the 16th century, in a Gothic style, and the chancel is also Gothic, from the 13th century. The village mill is from the end of the 17th century.

Soulme is a member of the association Les Plus Beaux Villages de Wallonie ("The Most Beautiful Villages of Wallonia").
