= Julian Dibbell =

American journalist

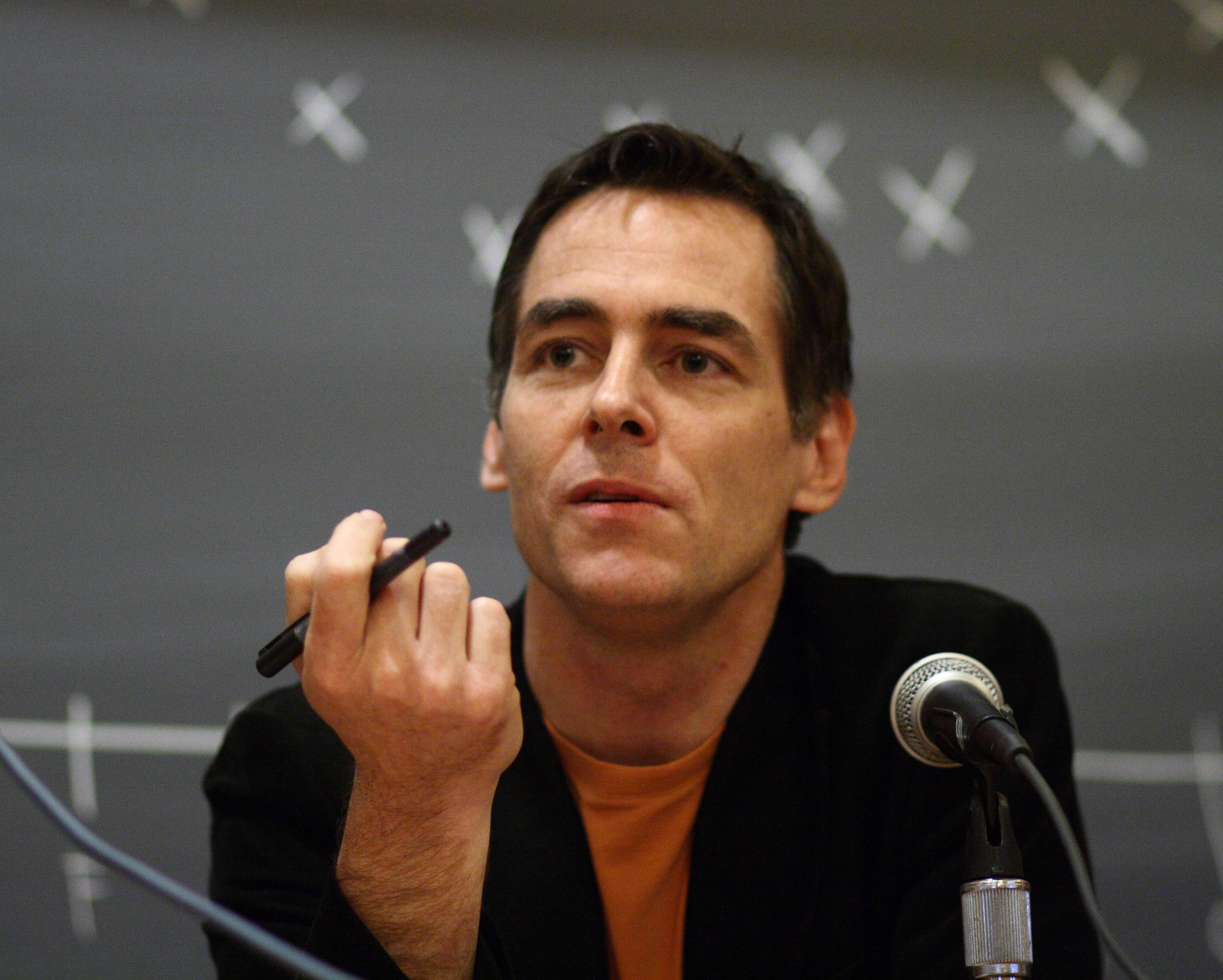
Dibbell in 2009

Julian Dibbell (/dɪˈbɛl/; born February 23, 1963) is an American author and technology journalist with a focus on social systems within online communities.

== Life and career ==
Dibbell was born in New York City. He grew up in Claremont, California and resides in Chicago, Illinois. His uncle is rock critic Robert Christgau, and Dibbell has also published music criticism. He is a non-resident fellow of the Stanford Center for Internet and Society and he previously served as George A. Miller Visiting Professor of Media at the University of Illinois at Urbana-Champaign. He is also a founder of the academic gaming research blog Terra Nova.

His 1993 article "A Rape in Cyberspace" detailed attempts of LambdaMOO, an online community, to quantify and deal with lawbreaking in its midst. The article was later included in his first book, My Tiny Life: Crime and Passion in a Virtual World. Dibbell has also written about Chinese gold farmers for The New York Times Magazine and about griefer culture for "Wired" Magazine. He chronicled his attempt to make a living playing MMORPGs in his second book, Play Money: or, How I Quit My Day Job and Made Millions Trading Virtual Loot.

Dibbell graduated from Yale University, summa cum laude, in 1986. He graduated from the University of Chicago Law School (where he was an editor of the University of Chicago Law Review) in 2014. Dibbell now practices law as a partner in the Business and Technology Sourcing practice of the global law firm Mayer Brown.

== Works ==
- Dibbell, Julian. My Tiny Life: Crime and Passion in a Virtual World. Owl Books, 1999. ISBN 0-8050-3626-1
- Dibbell, Julian. Play Money: or, How I Quit My Day Job and Made Millions Trading Virtual Loot. Basic Books, 2006. ISBN 0-465-01535-2
- Dibbell, Julian and Clarisse Thorn. Violation: Rape In Gaming. Amazon CreateSpace, 2012. ISBN 1480077453
