= Hierges =

- Commune
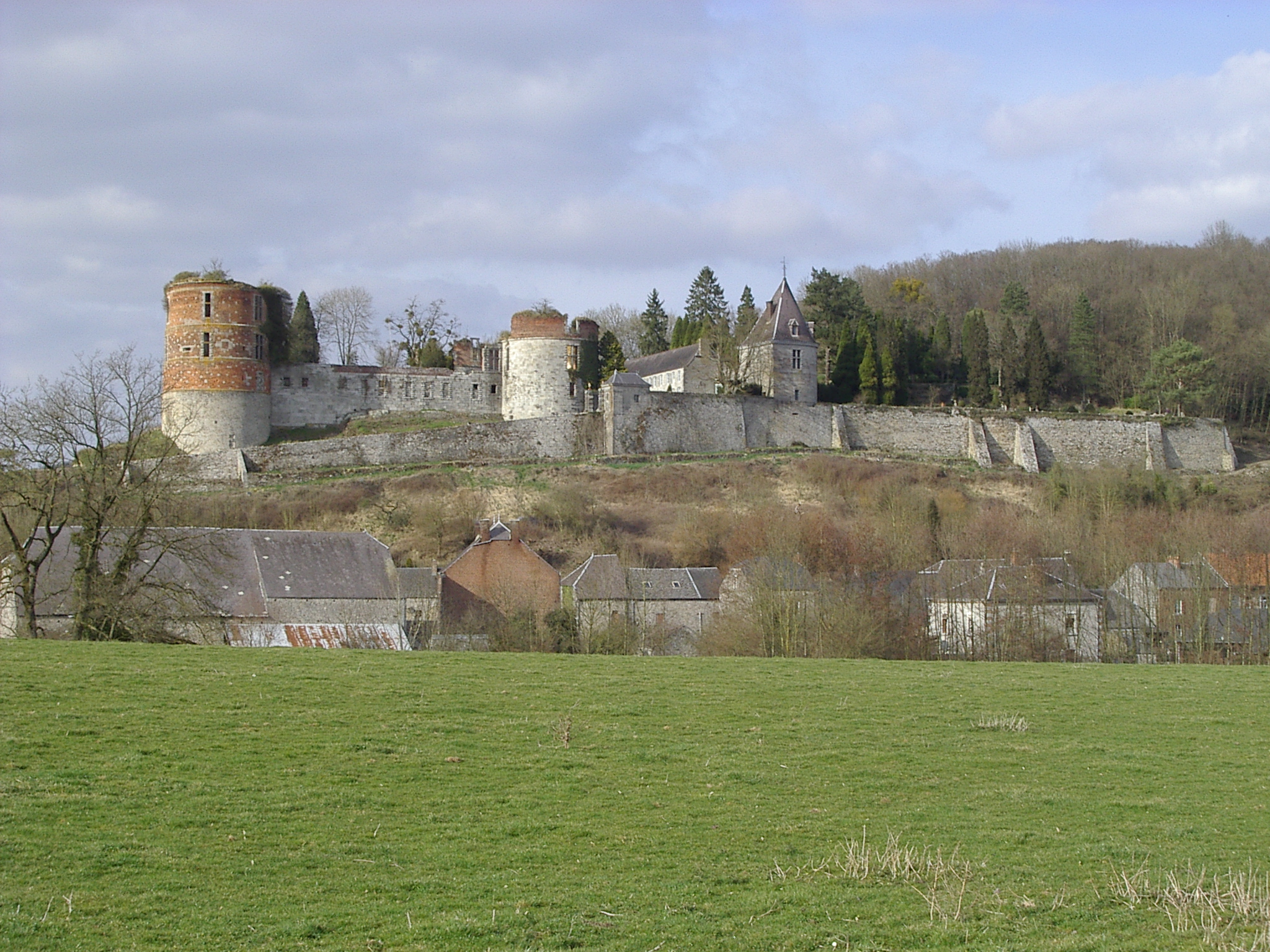
- The chateau in Hierges

- Coat of arms
- Location of Hierges
- Location within France Location within Grand Est
- Coordinates: 50°06′21″N 4°44′26″E
- Country: France
- Region: Grand Est
- Department: Ardennes
- Arrondissement: Charleville-Mézières
- Canton: Givet
- Intercommunality: Ardenne Rives de Meuse

Government
  - Mayor (2020–2026): Isabelle Bodart
- Area^{1}: 4.05 km^{2} (1.56 sq mi)
- Elevation: 121 m (397 ft)
- Population (2023): 154
  - Density: 38.0/km^{2} (98.5/sq mi)
- Time zone: UTC+01:00 (CET)
  - Summer (DST): UTC+02:00 (CEST)
- INSEE/Postal code: 08226 /08320
- ^{1} French Land Register data, which excludes lakes, ponds, glaciers > 1 km^{2} (0.386 sq mi or 247 acres) and river estuaries.

Hierges (French pronunciation: [jɛʁʒ]) is a commune in the Ardennes department in the Grand Est region in northern France.

Hierges is located in the Meuse valley along the Belgian border.

== Population ==
Historical population
Year	Pop.	±% p.a.
1968	297	—
1975	324	+1.25%
1982	300	−1.09%
1990	254	−2.06%
1999	220	−1.58%
2007	207	−0.76%
2012	213	+0.57%
2017	195	−1.75%
2023	154	−3.86%
Source: INSEE

== Sights and monuments ==
- Château de Hierges, a castle whose origins go back to the 16th century, was built on the site of an earlier 9th century castrum.

== See also ==
- Manasses of Hierges
- Héribrand II of Hierges
- Communes of the Ardennes department
