= Oxford Internet Institute =

Research institute at the University of Oxford

Coordinates: 51.760009°N 1.2639676°W

- Type: Department
- Established: 2001
- Director: Scott A. Hale
- Location: Oxford, United Kingdom
- Campus: Stephen A. Schwarzman Centre for the Humanities
- Website: www.oii.ox.ac.uk

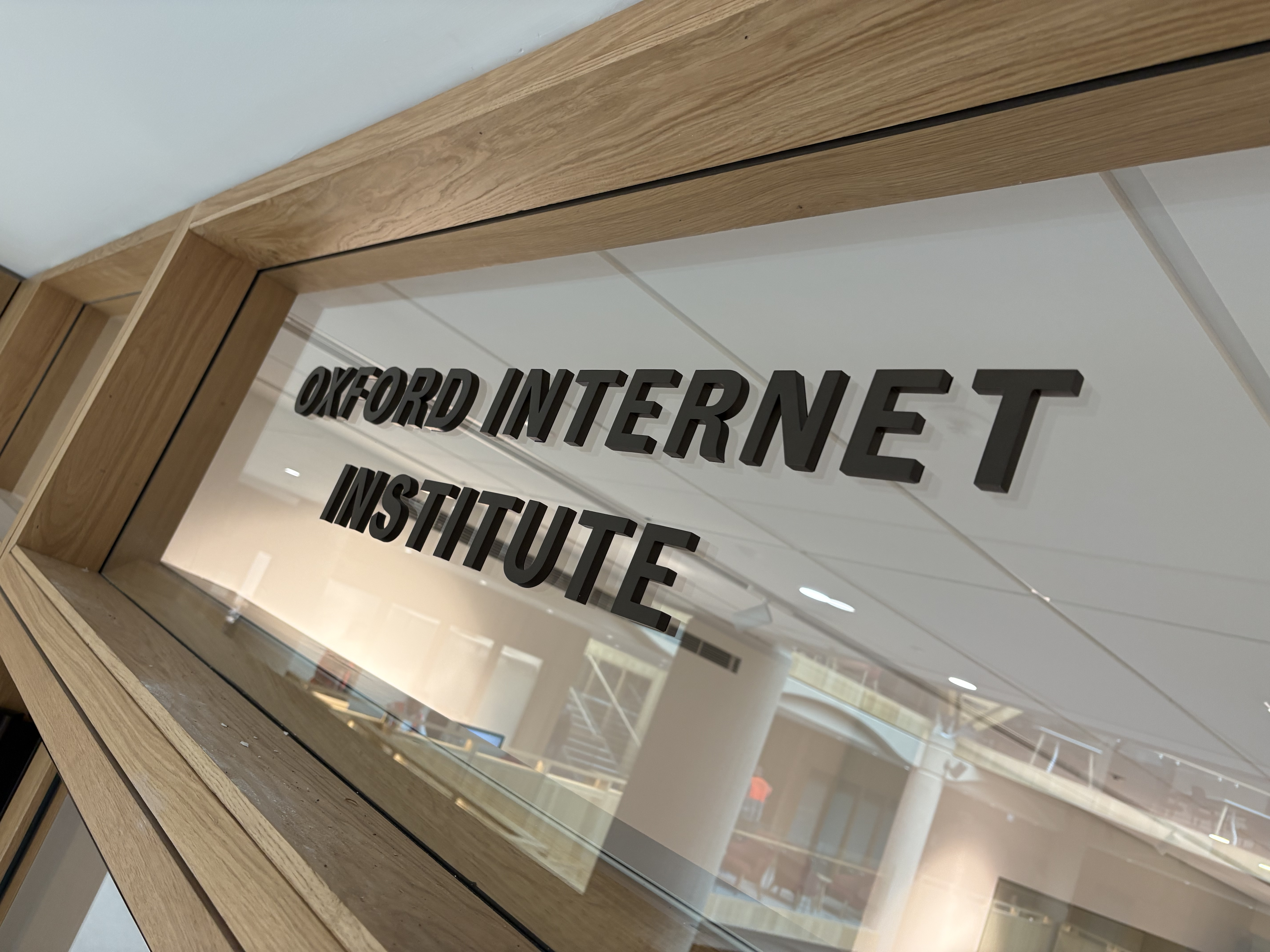
Entrance to the Oxford Internet Institute

The Oxford Internet Institute (OII) is a multidisciplinary department at the Social Sciences Division at the University of Oxford in Oxford, England, United Kingdom. It focuses on the study of social, economic, and political dimensions of digital technologies.

== Overview ==
Established in 2001, the Oxford Internet Institute was among the first academic centres to focus on the impacts of the internet and related technologies for people. Its work treats the internet as more than infrastructure, examining it as a space where identities are formed, economies are built, and power is contested, with research covering technologies ranging from algorithmic decision-making, large language models, and generative AI to location tracking, facial recognition, and autonomous systems.

The current Director, Dr Scott A. Hale, and Deputy Director, Dr Kathryn Eccles, were appointed in 2025.

OII was historically located across three buildings on Oxford's campus along St Giles. Since 2025, the OII is based within the Stephen A. Schwarzman Centre for the Humanities.

== Research ==
The Oxford Internet Institute conducts research on the social, political, and economic impacts of digital technologies. Its work combines theoretical, empirical, and computational approaches to examine how digital systems shape societies, economies, institutions, and individual behaviour.

The Institute produces evidence, software, tools, and conceptual frameworks that inform policy, guide innovation, and support public understanding of technology. OII scholarship has contributed to both methodological advances and practical applications, helping governments, industry, and civil society navigate the opportunities and challenges presented by the digital age.

The OII currently has the following research clusters reflecting the diverse expertise of faculty:

- Digital economies
- Digital knowledge and culture
- Digital politics and government
- Education, digital life and wellbeing
- Ethics and philosophy of information
- Information geography and inequality
- Information governance and security
- Social data science

The OII collaborates with other institutions of the University of Oxford such as the Blavatnik School of Government, the Reuters Institute for the Study of Journalism, the Department of Computer Science, the Department of Economics, the Saïd Business School, and the Oxford Martin School.

=== Research highlights ===
Research highlights include:

- Oxford Internet Surveys (OxIS) - A longitudinal national survey programme initiated in 2003, OxIS provides comprehensive data on internet access, usage patterns, and public attitudes in the UK. It has been instrumental in understanding digital divides and the evolving role of the internet in society.
- Fairwork Programme - Led by Professor Mark Graham, the Fairwork Programme evaluates platform work against five principles of fairness: fair pay, fair conditions, fair contracts, fair management, and fair representation. Fairwork's scorecards and policy recommendations have influenced both corporate practices and regulatory frameworks to improve gig economy labour standards.
- Children's wellbeing and technology use - Research by Professor Andrew K. Przybylski, including his 2019 Nature Human Behaviour paper with Dr Amy Orban, critically examines the links between screen time and adolescent wellbeing. Their findings suggest that digital technology use accounts for a minimal variance in adolescent wellbeing, challenging prevalent narratives about its negative impact.
- Counterfactual explanations in AI - Professors Sandra Wachter and Brent Mittelstadt developed the concept of counterfactual explanations, offering a method to understand automated decisions without exposing proprietary algorithms. Their 2018 paper in the Harvard Journal of Law & Technology has been widely cited and has influenced discussions on algorithmic transparency and accountability.
- Digital governance frameworks - Professor Helen Margetts has authored several influential works, including Digital Era Governance (2008), which explore how digital technologies reshape public administration and governance. Her research provides frameworks for understanding the intersection of technology, policy, and society.
- Data, privacy and rights - Professor Viktor Mayer-Schönberger's influential works examine the societal implications of data in the digital age. In Delete: The Virtue of Forgetting in the Digital Age (2009), he explores the importance of the 'right to be forgotten' and the need to reintroduce the capacity to forget in an era of perfect digital memory. In Big Data: A Revolution That Will Transform How We Live, Work, and Think (2013), co-authored with Kenneth Cukier, he discusses how the ability to analyze vast amounts of data is reshaping business, science, and society, and the implications of big data on decision-making, privacy, and the future of knowledge.
- Computational propaganda and democracy - Professor Philip N. Howard is known for his research on computational propaganda and the manipulation of public opinion through digital media. His book Lie Machines: How to Save Democracy from Troll Armies, Deceptive Robots, Junk News Operations, and Political Operatives (2020) has been widely cited for its analysis of how misinformation is produced and spread online, shaping global discussions on technology and democracy.

=== Studies of Wikipedia ===
OII has published several studies on Internet geography and Wikipedia. In November 2011, The Guardian Data Blog published maps of geotagged Wikipedia articles written in English, Arabic, Egyptian Arabic, French, Hebrew and Persian. OII researcher Mark Graham led the study and published the results on his blog, Zero Geography.

Graham also leads an OII project focused on how new users are perceived, represented, and incorporated into the Wikipedia community.

In 2013, OII researchers led by Taha Yasseri published a study of controversial topics in 10 different language versions of Wikipedia, using data related to "edit wars".

From 2013 to 2017, OII Associate Professor Scott A. Hale led work examining how bilinguals edit different language editions of Wikipedia, finding bilinguals can help spread information across language editions and are more active than monolingual editors.

In 2020, OII researcher Fabian Stephany and his colleague Hamza Salem published a study on using information-seeking behaviour patterns of Wikipedia users to predict US congressional elections. Their model accurately predicted the election outcome for 31 of 35 states in the 2020 United States Senate elections.

== Teaching ==
The Oxford Internet Institute offers two doctoral degrees, two master's programmes, and a Summer Doctoral Programme with UC Berkeley:

- MSc in Social Data Science - integrates computational and quantitative methods with social science insight to analyse how data and digital systems influence society.
- MSc in Social Science of the Internet - explores how digital technologies transform everyday life, work, governance, and social structures using interdisciplinary theory and methods.
- DPhil in Information, Communication and the Social Sciences - supports doctoral research into the social, political, and cultural impacts of internet technologies, drawing on multiple disciplinary lenses.
- DPhil in Social Data Science - enables in-depth doctoral work at the interface of data science and the social sciences, combining technical tools with theory to address digital challenges.
- Summer Doctoral Programme (with UC Berkeley) - brings PhD students from various institutions together for intensive seminars, training, and networking in internet studies.

== History ==
The Oxford Internet Institute was established in 2001 following proposals by Andrew Graham, then Master-Elect of Balliol College, and MP Derek Wyatt, with the support of Oxford University and Vice-Chancellor Colin Lucas. Its creation was funded by a major donation from Dame Stephanie Shirley through the Shirley Foundation, alongside support from the Higher Education Funding Council for England.

The OII was founded as a multidisciplinary department rooted in the social sciences, with a mandate to study the societal, political, economic, and ethical implications of the internet. From its earliest years, the Institute sought to link research with policy, a focus emphasised by its first Director, William H. Dutton, in 2002.

== Directors ==
- Andrew Graham Acting (2001–2002)
- William H. Dutton (2002–2011)
- Helen Margetts (2011–2018)
- Philip N. Howard (2018–2021)
- Victoria Nash (2021–2025)
- Scott A. Hale (2025–present)

== See also ==
- Berkeley Center for Law and Technology at Boalt Hall
- Berkman Klein Center for Internet & Society at Harvard Law School
- Information Society Project at Yale Law School
- Weizenbaum Institute
- Haifa Center for Law & Technology at Haifa University
- Centre for Internet and Society (India)
- iLabour Project
