= Ancient Anguish =

- Developers: Balz "Zor" Meierhans, Olivier "Drake" Maquelin, project community
- Engine: LPMud 3.2 (Amylaar)
- Platform: Platform independent
- Release: 1992
- Genre: Role-playing
- Mode: Multiplayer

Ancient Anguish, abbreviated AA, is a fantasy-themed MUD, a text-based online role-playing game. Founded in 1991 by Balz "Zor" Meierhans and Olivier "Drake" Maquelin, it opened to the public on February 2, 1992. It is free-to-play, but has been supported by player donations since 1994.

Ancient Anguish is based on a "map-coordinate" system rather than linked areas, which contributes to the immersive feeling of entering another 'world'. Areas are then placed on the nearly 10,000 room "map" and tied into the geography and history of the fantasy world, called Oerthe. In addition, the mud strives for a "describe-all" policy for all areas, whereby any item/object/feature should respond to as many of the senses as possible, which adds to the immersive quality, although not all older areas conform to current balance and describe-all policies. It is noted as incorporating adult themes into its gameplay.

== Administration and site history ==
A screenshot from Ancient Anguish showing a user listing and an introductory location

In the early 1990s, most MUDs were housed on university mainframe computers, either illicitly or with tacit approval from the computer science department (many of whom played or created the games they hosted). In late 1993, Ancient Anguish faced the threat of being shut down by the Swiss university that hosted the game, Eidgenössische Technische Hochschule Zürich, for excessive bandwidth usage. Hundreds of players made donations totalling more than US$7000 and bought a SparcStation 2 workstation, relocating the MUD to Washington, D.C.

At the same time, Zor (who functioned as God, or chief administrator, at the time) abdicated his singular authority over the MUD and turned over control to a newly created Senate of Wizards, with Amante serving as the Senate President. The Senate appoints Archwizards of Law, Balance, Quality Control, Education, Mudlib, World and Map, and Driver. The Senate consists of the Arch Wizards of the different functional administrations, plus additional Senators at large. In 1995, Amante abdicated his role as Senate President and the Senate assumed complete control over the MUD, and has continued to administer with 3 to 12 members who periodically change.

Over the next decade, Ancient Anguish was hosted by a number of access providers:

- Mid 1995 to 1996: Pacific Rim Networks in Bellingham, Washington
- Mid 1996 to July 1997: Chaco Inc. in San Jose, CA
- July 1997 to Feb 2006: InReach Internet in Stockton, CA
- Feb 2006 to August 2008: LocalLink.net in Michigan
- August 2008 to December 2024: Colocation America in Los Angeles, CA
- December 2024 to present: Ionos.com in Philadelphia, PA.

Though its population has never been as high as some other MUDs, it remains one of the more popular LPMuds on the internet today, despite facing stiff competition from commercial and/or graphical MMORPGs. Ironically, Ancient Anguish has been cited by original EverQuest designer Ryan Palacio as being heavily played by the EverQuest development team. It was also the basis of one of the earliest ethnographies of virtual worlds, and was further explored in a master's thesis on the sociolinguistics of virtual worlds. The lead designer of Ultima Online, Raph Koster, played Ancient Anguish for inspiration creating LegendMUD. Various aspects of LegendMUD later shaped the design of Ultima Online.

== Development ==
New code is continually added to the game by a team of volunteer "wizards", or coders. Players can elect to become a wizard upon meeting three requirements: 1.) achieving a minimum of 1 million experience points; 2.) completing a number of the quests available; and 3.) earning a number of exploration points (sometimes called "Gaius Points", after the sage who provides hints to guide players to find them). Players may elect to solve more quests and fewer exploration points, or more exploration points and fewer quests.

Exploration points are generally completed through exploration, prodding, touching, and otherwise investigating a given area or room, or completion of a mini-quest. The hints provided by the Gaius character are generally vague, and no direct statistic is available to players.

New wizards go through an educational process where they learn about coding enhancements for the game, develop an idea for a new area, and proceed to build it. The system was designed to provide guidance both to experienced programmers and those with no experience. These new areas go through a process of validation to ensure they meet the thematic, quality, and balance/playability requirements of the game, and are then opened to all players.

In late 2005, player levels were expanded from 19 to 50.

The game's move to the Michigan server brought several changes: during the move, the old site was available in "Anarchy Mode", a traditional experience when the game moved from one server to another, with all rules on player killing, multiplaying, wizard-mortal interference, and other guidelines of Law suspended. Since all player files had already been backed up prior to the move, none of this had any long-term effect on players and allowed them to "blow off steam". It proved popular enough that the Senate considered hosting regular Anarchy events on an alternate port of the new server; the Anarchy port was used to host some parts of a mudwide competition called the AAlympics, for example. In addition, the move prompted a change from 25-hour mandatory reboots to 49-hour reboots, which were tested in late April and then made permanent. These reboots, common in MUDs to recover memory leaks and to clear 'trash' items which accumulate, restore the world to a default state, leaving characters to regain equipment from scratch. All skills, stats, and gold are retained.

In May 2006, a new continent named Infidian was opened after several years' wait, nearly doubling the available landmass space on the map for areas and alleviating overcrowding of older areas on the main continent of Anguish (from which the game gets its name). Several areas were placed on its map already at the time of opening, and further ones discovered later to bring the number of areas on the new continent to 21. Infidian is reputed to be the historical homeland of the humans who came to Anguish, where the rest of the races already lived, and is nearly pacifistic.

== Gameplay ==
On Ancient Anguish, a player can choose from multiple character classes to experience different play styles, including:

- Fighter: A hack and slasher, the best combat abilities.
- Mage: Mages have a large assortment of spells, and can specialize in multiple advanced schools.
- Ranger: Rangers are intrepid scouts trained in wilderness survival with many useful outdoor abilities. They are known for crafting, taming w wildlife, and raising puppies through selective breeding to be formidable companions.
- Cleric: Clerics are in contact with the gods, and call on divine aid.
- Shapeshifter: Magic users from another continent, they can assume different forms with diverse powers.
- Necromancer: Practitioners of black magic, poor at hand-to-hand combat but masters of dark rituals. They often animate the dead to do their bidding.
- Paladin: Stalwart and pure fighters, they are champions of the innocent and the weak against the evils of the world.
- Jaochi: Jacochi's strive for perfection within themselves, and learn patterns with their own bodies as their weapons.
- Artificer: Artificers are expert crafters and enchanters of external devices and magic items.
- Soulbinder: Soulbinders rely on touch to tie their energy to their target, and learning from opponents.
- Rogue: Despite persistent rumours, there are no rogues in Ancient Anguish.

Players become more proficient in different types of weapons after gaining experience using them. The more proficient they are, the more damaging weapons they can use. Fighters (who lack the powerful spells/special abilities of other classes) are able to skill more quickly than other classes, making them excellent at dealing damage. At the same time, a wide variety of non-combat abilities are available, including fishing, origami, pottery, prospecting, seduction, and weaving. There are also poker tables, several chess boards, and trivia games within the game.

=== Guilds ===
Players can join different guilds on the game, for social or adventuring-related benefits. Each guild has its own purpose and restrictions, along with a guildhall and guild-oriented chatline. These guilds include:

- The Knights of Drin are the personal knights of the king, Drin Trueheart. Orcs are not permitted to join, and most NPCs found in the guild's home base of Nepeth will attack orcs on sight. Because of the martial focus of the group, only fighters, clerics, rangers, paladins, artificers, and adventurers are permitted to join.
- The Scythe are an anti-establishment group of barbarians and hedonists that deny access to anyone with a drop of elven blood. For classes, paladins and artificers are refused admittance. The Scythe formed as a result of opposition to the Knights of Drin.
- The Monks of Antana are a strong religious force for good. Dwarves and orcs are not permitted to join; neither are necromancers, due to their evil acts.
- The Courts of Chaos are a loosely knit cult that worship the forces of Chaos. Only the evil can join, therefore paladins are refused. Clerics on Ancient Anguish are not required to worship only "good" gods/goddesses (such as Antana), and are therefore welcome to join and worship the gods of Chaos. Fighters were not permitted for a long time due to a focus on spellcasting, but that has since changed.
- The Black Bear is a group of nature lovers, allowing all races to join. Paladins, necromancers, and rogues are not permitted to join.
- The Eldar, a coalition of elves, half-elves and humans. Any class is permitted to join, as the guild focus is mostly social. The guild's purpose builds on the historical alliances between elves and humans, even during wars between the two species.
- The Society of the Raven is a band of cutthroats, brigands, footpads and other denizens of the night. Rogues of any race may join, but no other classes. Population has been light lately, due to a heavy crackdown by Law on stealing from players, one of the rogues' primary abilities, but the population does seem to be on the rebound, perhaps because recently, rogue theft and several in-game "anti-theft" devices have been "rebalanced" in favor of rogues.
- The Snowfolk guild is the youngest guild. They make their home far to the north on the Arctic glacier. They are fundamentally survivalists with a cheerful disposition and promote good natured attitudes. Their powers are based on the icy materials of their home. Necromancers and members of the Society of Killers are not permitted to join the guild. Most distinctive is that members are more resistant to cold and more vulnerable to fire.

== Technical infrastructure ==
Ancient Anguish is based on the Amylaar LPMud driver and the Loch Ness mudlib, from the MUD of the same name.
