= Discworld MUD =

- Developers: David "Pinkfish" Bennett, Craig "Furball" Richmond, Sean A. "Lynscar" Reith, Evan Scott, Derek "Ceres" Harding, Jacqui "Sojan" Greenland, project community
- Engine: FluffOS
- Platform: Platform independent
- Release: 1991
- Genre: Comic fantasy MUD
- Mode: Multiplayer

Discworld MUD is a popular fanmade MUD, a text-based online role-playing game, set in the Discworld as depicted in the Discworld series of books by Terry Pratchett.

Some typical activity on the MUD, featuring a map, soul commands, talker channels and performance of rituals.

== History ==
The MUD was founded in 1991 and opened to the public in 1992, with continuous updates ever since. As of 2025, it is thirty-three years old. Originally containing a small section of the then rather loosely defined Ankh-Morpork, over time more locations have been added as the world has been further described in the book series, and laid out in the map supplements (such as The Streets of Ankh-Morpork and The Discworld Mapp). It now consists of areas that attempt to simulate several big cities (Ankh-Morpork, Bes Pelargic, Genua and Djelibeybi) on two continents, a larger number of smaller towns, and more than a million rooms which form the land between the cities and towns, with markers designating canon cities yet to be built.

The MUD was founded in Perth, Western Australia, by David "Pinkfish" Bennett, Craig "Furball" Richmond, Sean A. "Lynscar" Reith and Evan Scott. It was an outgrowth of another MUD called Discworld II. The MUD ran for a while on a machine in Melbourne before moving to run in the UK on a machine at Compulink where Gordon "DrGoon" was added to the administration team.

The MUD was later hosted for a time at Trinity College in Hartford, Connecticut by one of its undergraduates: Michael "Bastian" Hammill. "Bastian" served as chief administrator of the game and "god" of Discworld (a character role), while "Pinkfish" continued in his capacity as head game developer. The school's IT administrator eventually ruled the project a hacking attempt due to multiple UNIX rlogin attempts from across the globe. This was actually just the game developers, or "creators", working as part of an international programming effort. The mistake cost the MUD another one of its homes.

Also of note, at the time "Bastian" was issued a cease and desist order by Terry Pratchett's attorney. The author's legal adviser thought the game was a for-profit effort and therefore a violation of Pratchett's copyright. "Bastian" assured both Pratchett and his attorney it was a fan-based effort and invited the author to visit "Pinkfish's" creation. Pratchett was assuaged. The Discworld project was allowed to continue.

After a while the game was moved to Seattle, running on a machine at one of the admin's workplace, Derek "Ceres" Harding, before again moving back to the UK to run at Jacqui "Sojan" Greenland's house.

Discworld has publicly released the code base under which it runs on a couple of occasions, allowing other MUDs to use the same base for writing their worlds.

== Software ==
The MUD's software is divided into two sections — the mudlib and the driver. The MUD is based on a from-scratch mudlib and runs on FluffOS, a fork of the MudOS driver, placing it in the LPMud family. The driver is largely open-source, with new releases usually made available quickly, while cut-down versions of the mudlib including most of the underlying features are occasionally released (most recently in 2003), allowing the use of most of the basic object classes and tools of the MUD.

It is expected that players who wish to help with coding the game will apply to join the game's development team, rather than working independently and submitting patches. Developers are not automatically taken from players at a certain skill level, instead being recruited into a hierarchy from the player base with an application and interview system. The underlying code is largely obscured from other players, with developers holding a policy of secrecy with actual game code and algorithms. Several useful algorithms such as that for determining experience costs have been either reverse-engineered or extracted from the released code by players, however, and can be generally found on various informational websites.

Before code is released live for general play, it is tested for bugs, typos, playability and ensuring the integrity of the theme by a group of beta tester players, aka Playtesters. Often new items, areas, quests, and new spells or abilities are generated from ideas from this group of players.

=== Interface ===
The Discworld command system is a customized text parser allowing for flexible interactions with objects and a way to specify how the command is structured. In addition to adjectives and properties attached to game objects, allows advanced semantic recognition to specify in-game objects (including 'living' things):

You are unburdened by:
Holding: a set of pearl prayer beads (left hand).
Wearing: a black backpack, a neat off-white linen robe and two silver rings.
(under) : a utility belt.
Carrying: a prayer book.

> locate leather things
The utility belt (worn) is in your inventory.
The black backpack (worn) is in your inventory.

> locate leather things except black things
The utility belt (worn) is in your inventory.

> glance at second worn thing
The neat off-white linen robe.

Other interface features include a basic in-game text editor, for editing in-game mail and other chunks of text, context-sensitive help, and optional sections of topological map (known as "lookmaps") to aid navigation.

One of the strongest development priorities in recent years has been on textual depth, providing rich descriptions and additional details, rather than on expanding the world or on providing higher-level content. Many interesting or useful details in descriptive text can be elaborated upon by applying more specific criteria to the "look" command.

== Player Interaction ==
=== Chat ===
For purely message-based interaction, the MUD provides a talker system with a number of fixed channels, including general chat channels, channels for development organisation, and channels reserved for members of many in-game organisations. In addition to these, clubs can be formed which gain their own channels and optional electoral system. One example is Taxi whose members provide magical transportation around the game world.

=== RP & PvP ===
Roleplaying is optional, and players can be observed playing in many different roles both in and out of character, from organisational, to social, to 'numberchasing' (grinding, especially for skills). Player versus player interaction is on an opt-in basis, with characters over two days of play old being allowed to remove their protected status. There are some notable exceptions to this — for example, the player councils can hire in-game, NPC (non-player character) assassins to kill a player who hasn't opted for PvP status.

=== Player councils ===
The game world includes several political regions. The cities of Ankh-Morpork and Djelibeybi are run by councils of elected player magistrates. These magistrates have the ability to develop player law, which they can also carry out. In areas with no player council, no written player laws apply, and only the game's acceptable use policy, invariably referred to as "the rules", applies.

Ankh-Morpork has seven magistrates, while the Djelibeybi council has five. Elections are held every six months. The council system is based on the game Nomic.

=== Atmosphere ===
Taking the humorous aspect of Pratchett's work and running with it, the atmosphere on Discworld MUD is frequently whimsical, with a general fondness displayed for silliness and nonsense. It contains numerous silly references to frogs and wombles.

== Mechanics ==
The fundamental game mechanics of the MUD are based on a 'stat/skill' division, with a player's stats (statistics) relating to intrinsic properties, being semi-permanent, and skills (relating to aptitudes) increased by spending experience points to self-teach, or to learn from other player/non-player characters. Skill abilities are based on a diminishing returns system, in which a character's 'bonus', or ability to perform a certain task, is calculated on a logarithmic basis from the character's skill level and a geometric mean of related stats. Levels are uncapped, but also rise in experience point cost per level.

Experience points can be gained in a number of ways — in successful combat with NPCs, in the use of guild points (categorised action points), for exploration of areas, in the completion of quests, the accomplishment of in-game achievements, and simply by waiting — a very slow rate of 'idle XP' is given to players merely for being online.

The skill system contains a number of quirks and odd features; for example, some skills are used in unexpected ways, such as the skill "adventuring.movement.climbing.rock", which, while it is used for climbing rocks, is typically used to climb virtually any surface which isn't a tree or rope, such as a metal drainpipe. Because of the wide range of uses that skills are put to, individual skills are not documented, so working out what skill you need to perform a given task can sometimes be challenging — for example, the skill "adventuring.direction", typically used to avoid getting lost in extreme circumstances, is also the skill used in both reading and crafting maps.

Characters begin with seven lives, which can be replaced in-game. A player who dies with no lives can only be revived by a magical rite that consumes expensive components and requires the cooperation of eight high level wizards. Most PvP deaths do not reduce your life total, but otherwise have the same effects. Before 2012, a player that ran out of lives could not be revived at all.

The majority of the game world is not persistent, resetting areas and objects invisibly, but players' inventories, the contents of rentable houses, and safe deposit box-like vaults are saved.

=== Guilds ===
A large part of the original intent for Discworld MUD was to move away from a restrictive class system, and to allow a player to do (almost) anything with enough effort and advancement. Each character can join one of a selection of guilds, a combination of class and in-game organisation, and each guild has several unique abilities not shared with any other. Many mundane attributes such as hit points, perceptiveness, and swimming skill are not affected by choice of guild. While players can advance and benefit from any skill, players get specific abilities within the skill set of their guild and may advance their primary skills more cheaply than by learning normally.

There are seven Guilds: warrior, wizard, priest, witch, thief, assassin, and fool. Each of which contain more specialized subguilds with more specialized skills and different thematic flavour.

As of April 1, 2019, the Fools' Guild and associated fool class were added to the game. This was done to coincide with April Fools' Day, but has remained and grown as an actual guild.

== Canon and divergence ==
Content has been worked upon continuously as the Discworld series of books has been growing, therefore there are smatterings of continuity taken from different books introduced in different regions. Some changes to the world have been made to allow a limited degree of player-control (such as player-elected administration for some of the in-world organizations) rather than using NPCs created from book characters. Wizards in the books can only cast a spell from memory once, but in the MUD they are able to cast spells from memory an unlimited number of times.

== Reception ==
In April 1999, Discworld was selected as The Mud Connector's Mud of the Month.

In Total PC Gaming, UK edition, Discworld was 2nd of the Top Three MUDs in the MMO Supplement in issue 7, and received a special mention in the MMO Supplement in issue 15, in the "We Love" section.
