= 3Kingdoms =

- Developer: Project community
- Engine: LDMud
- Release: 1992; 34 years ago
- Genres: Cross-genre, MUD
- Mode: Multiplayer

3Kingdoms, abbreviated 3K, is a MUD, a text-based online role-playing game, founded in 1992.

== Game characteristics ==
A screenshot of one of the many different initial login screens for 3K, as seen in MUSHclient

The MUD has a cross-genre setting; the eponymous three kingdoms are Fantasy, Science Fiction, and Chaos, the latter following an anything-goes satirical theme. These settings connect through the MUD's central city of Pinnacle.

A main point of player character differentiation is in the choice of "guild", which is an option resembling a character class, but which, on 3K, can only be chosen once the character has advanced through its first few levels. The exception is the Adventurer guild, which new characters belong to by default. The selection of guilds reflects the cross-genre setting, ranging from fantasy commonplaces such as knights, priests (formerly called clerics), mages, and necromancers to Jedi, cyborgs, Fremen and changelings (formerly called the animal guild).

3K's Web site features ongoing news about the MUD; at one time this news feed was called the 3K New York Times.

== Reception ==
The MUD has received positive critical response for its friendliness to and accommodation of new players, and has been noted as "well-loved and full of life".

== Technical infrastructure ==
3K is an LPMud running on the LDMud game driver with an unnamed custom mudlib.
