= Monochrome BBS =

British bulletin board system

Monochrome BBS, known to users as "Mono," is a text-based multi-user bulletin board system featuring thousands of discussion files, along with games, user messaging, and a talker. As of November 2024 it is one of the few BBS's still in operation and actively used on a daily basis by its community. Monochrome runs on custom software, making the platform and user experience distinct from other bulletin board systems.

== History ==
The underlying software (mono - lowercase m) was originally written in around 1990 by David Brownlee, then a student at City, University of London, for his final year project. Monochrome BBS (uppercase M) is a specific instance of mono; another instance of mono was used for a few years as the official user interface for students in the Information Science department, but usage declined around 1996. Once the Monochrome board was up and running, fellow students were given accounts and word began to spread. The first non-City users were admitted in 1991-1992. Eventually Mono's userbase became international, although the majority of those joining were UK university students.

The server was originally sited on the university campus, with the address mono.city.ac.uk.

By its peak in the mid-1990s over 8000 accounts had been created and there were often more than 150 people logged in simultaneously, making it arguably the most popular Internet-based BBS in the UK at the time.

The artist Alan Sondheim has written of his experiences of Mono:

I connected at first to various local BBS (bulletin board systems), but quickly became tired of them; I wasn't interested in participating in local community as much as I desired to explore the Internet itself. I had an account at the New School, now the New University, in New York - one of the worst-managed computer systems I've ever used. But it did allow me to log into the Monochrome Bulletin Board in England - www.mono.org - and it was through this that I made my first "international" contacts. I also learned just what was possible with ASCII-text-based formats; using escape codes and other techniques, text could change color, move on the screen, blink, and do all sorts of other interesting things. (Later, but not much later, I played around with the codes myself, sending out an invisible text which made the rest of the reader's Inbox invisible as well.). (p.24)

However, with the advent of web forums and GUI-based instant messaging, Mono's text-only format was already seen as nostalgic even in 1994 when it appeared in the first issue of .net magazine. Within the Mono community there were discussions about moving the content to a web forum, but the consensus was to retain the format. Activity declined over the years, particularly as LiveJournal became popular, but remained fairly strong even to the present day, when 30 or more members may be logged on during a typical day. In 2010, Mono was noted by Eileen Brown as an example of a bulletin board that is still in use. Most of those now using the system are long-time members.

== Content ==
Mono has thousands of discussion files, along with multi-user dungeon games. Discussions are on a wide variety of topics, including technology, science, arts, music, sports, work, family, news as well as general chat. These are organised hierarchically by topic; individual sections are maintained by different users. Each menu can be highly customised, thus each section has its own "personality," conventions and sometimes codes of conduct. Section moderators are able to create animated banner ads which rotate on the main menu.

Mono's animation programming language ('manim') allows for simple ASCII animations, and interactive scripts such as quizzes and 1980s-style adventure games.

Mono also contained a built-in Telnet client ('mtel') that was used to provide access to MUDs such as GodWars that were hosted on the mono servers.

== Community ==
Mono members can express their online identity in a number of ways:

- namelines - short messages that appeared next to a users name in edits and on the main users-on screen.
- infotexts - short text sections on a users' profile which could optionally be edited and animated using Mono's animation language.
- talker customisation - including description of user, user's home room and actions within that room

As there are no other identifiers such as avatars, colour schemes, signatures, etc., as used on web-based forums, personality and identity are often expressed through comments files, namelines and in personal diaries, a feature which was launched in 1997.

Early on, Monochrome established a dedicated section for "Meets," where users regularly organised weekend-long events to meet up at various places around the UK (and occasionally in other countries where there were clusters of users). These were often attended 50 or more users, with accommodation offered by local hosts. These were often the first opportunity to put a face to a name, and made other users less anonymised on the BBS. Towns with several users sometimes had local chat files and regular meets.

After 2000, large meets became less common due to family and work pressures, but there were meets around festivals and other events - including several weddings between people who had met on Mono. In 1996 a marriage between two members, one from the USA and one from the UK, was featured in the Daily Telegraph, "Good Morning with Anne and Nick" on BBC1, and a Channel 4 short film called "Get Netted" amongst other sources. This was at a time when the Internet was still new to the mainstream public and media, so such relationships were novel.

The main menu

== Operation ==
Mono's interface was designed for ease of use - most operations are performed using single keypresses, and the options available are shown on-screen wherever possible, so it is relatively straightforward for a newcomer to start making their way around without reading much documentation.

The Esc key may be pressed at any time to provide a menu of additional facilities such as the talker, messaging systems, personal profile and settings.

Files are organised hierarchically by subject into menus and submenus. A file is composed of edits (comments). In modern Forum parlance these are analogous to threads and posts respectively. While reading a file, a user may add a comment to it, send part of it to another user, email it to themselves. The entire menu system can be scanned, for new edits, and users can skip individual files and menus which do not interest them. This allows users to keep up to date with several discussions at a time, throughout the day.

The talker takes some cues from MUDs by being composed of rooms, for which users write the descriptions, and a visitor may wander through these using the cardinal directions. What is said is only relayed to people in the same room, and rooms may be locked by their owner for privacy.

The messaging system (u2u in Monochrome terminology) allows sending messages directly to one or more other users. If a recipient is logged in, the message is received immediately and the recipient's client displays the message or, if they are in the middle of editing a file, beeps to alert them and displays it when they finish. Otherwise, the message is stored and shown to them when they next connect.

A Users On screen shows currently logged on users, their nameline and current activity, location and connection statistics. This information is also shown on the web page.

A number of other scripts have been written by users to maintain files, menus, generate files automatically, provide wiki-like functionality, collect and display RSS feeds within the system and even a rudimentary Twitter client.

== Technology ==
When Monochrome was first launched, users connected to Monochrome via the X.25 protocol (using the JANET network) on address 000041002300. Later, when JANET became internet-addressable, telnet was employed. Nowadays SSH is the recommended option.

The mono software has a client-server architecture: users connect to the mono client, which in turn communicates with a number of server applications such as md.serv (the overarching controller), md.talk (the Talker daemon) and md.file (the u2u delivery daemon).

Originally the client software ran on separate machines from the server software. At the peak of its popularity in the mid-1990s there were up to five client machines dedicated to Monochrome, all simultaneously talking to a single central server which both ran the mono server applications and served the files to the clients. This implemented a form of redundancy in that users could still access Monochrome even if one or several of the client machines failed; however, the server machine remained a single point of failure.

Most of the communication between the client and the server software uses network sockets, but files still need to be directly accessible by the client; an API for client-server file processing was much discussed but never completed. This meant that when separate client and server machines were used, the server's central file store had to be exported to all the client machines using NFS, which was a major bottleneck.

The Monochrome cluster was historically based on Sun Microsystems machines (most often, old disused or discarded machines from universities or businesses), but has also run on DEC Alpha and Intel x86 hardware. A variety of operating systems have been involved historically, including SunOS and OpenBSD, but NetBSD has been the chosen OS for some years. As hardware speeds have increased and the number of users has declined, Monochrome today is just a single virtual machine performing both client and server roles.

Most of the core client and server code is written in C, though a number of additional utilities have been written in Perl.
