= GodWars =

God Wars 2
- God Wars II logo
- Developer: Richard Woolcock
- Series: GodWars
- Engine: custom codebase
- Platform: OS independent
- Release: March 10, 2002
- Genre: MMORPG
- Mode: multiplayer

GodWars is a family of MUD engines derived from Merc, created in 1995 by Richard Woolcock, also known as "KaVir". GodWars' setting is influenced by White Wolf's World of Darkness.

In 1996 the code was illegally released and advertised on a website for free download. After fighting extensively to stop the illegal use of his codebase, Woolcock later released the code publicly.

The original GodWars was later renamed Dark City then Last City, with added wilderness code.

Since 2000, between 28 and 84 derivatives of the God Wars code have been active, including Vampire Wars, which is based on White Wolf's Vampire: The Masquerade and won the October 1998 Mud of the Month award at The Mud Connector.

== God Wars II ==
MUSHclient screenshot showing a typical dungeon in God Wars II.

In 2002, Woolcock wrote a new MUD named God Wars II, a conceptual sequel to GodWars, with a more personal dark fantasy universe.

=== Combat System ===
The game relies heavily on player versus player combat, like the original GodWars, and features a deep and complex combat system where the player has to manipulate the limbs associated with the attacks, creating combos when the commands are stringed together. This combo system is inspired from the tabletop game Spellbinder, of which the complexity is comparable to chess and go.

The combat system was prototyped in his earlier Gladiator Pits MUD, which won the maintainability award in a public coding competition, the 16K MUD competition, and has been called "stunning".

=== Other Features ===
God Wars II is also noted for its war mini-game (a strategic poker variant) and its helpful graphical MUSHclient interface. This interface includes a map that the user can click to travel faster and mechanical shortcuts. The game has a large world, without rooms typical of MUDs but using coordinates, and a process for advanced character customization.
