= LegendMUD =

- Developer: Project community
- Producers: Ruth Williams; Todd McKimmey; Mike Weatherbee
- Designers: Raph and Kristen Koster, Rick and Sherry Delashmit
- Engine: DikuMUD
- Platform: Platform independent
- Release: 1994
- Genre: Historical fantasy MUD
- Mode: Multiplayer

LegendMUD is a text-only MUD game founded by a group of friends including virtual world designer Raph Koster. It features historically significant story elements and award-winning gameplay. It opened publicly on February 14, 1994. It has received critical praise for its research and attention to detail in reconstructing past cultures within the game context.

== Game characteristics ==
A screenshot of LegendMUD's login screen

The thematic structure of LegendMUD is based on a literal interpretation of historical legend, with content based on real locales at various points in history, but with mythological elements included as concrete reality. LegendMUD was derived from DikuMUD. At present, it features over 8,000 rooms contained within 60 areas.

LegendMUD features several innovations, one of which was that players were not required to select a character class, such as mage or warrior. Rather, a skill system is used, which has been noted as extensive and original. The player selects a hometown affecting the types of skills which are then possible to learn. For example, a character from the industrial period in San Francisco has the opportunity to learn about guns, but cannot learn magic. In contrast, a character from ancient period Ireland is capable of learning druidic skills, but can never learn about more modern ideas such as field surgery.

To further innovate on the learning of skills, the character must through interaction with non-player characters learn whatever that NPC had to teach, with some of these requiring a small form of quest.

== History ==
In October 1995, LegendMUD was selected as The Mud Connector's Mud of the Month.

=== "A Story About a Tree" ===
Koster wrote "A Story About a Tree", a short essay and epitaph about the reported real-world death of a Norwegian LegendMUD player named Karyn and the manner in which the game's community grieved. Richard Bartle considered the incident to be a key event in the development of virtual worlds' ethics, similar to "A Rape in Cyberspace". The 'death' demonstrated that people can develop feelings for each other via the virtual world medium, thus experiencing real emotions about somebody they've never met, even an entirely fictional persona. "A Story About a Tree" is considered as a major counterargument against the "it's just a game" point of view on virtual worlds. Furthermore, it showcased that while being a very real object of grief to one party, it can indeed remain just a game for another.

While working on a documentary film about virtual reality in 2002, Tracy Spaight was spurred to investigate Koster's story after a conversation with Bartle. Spaight found that Karyn had been using a photo of 1995 Frøken Norge (now called Miss Norway) finalist Trine Solberg Lepperød. Lepperød told Spaight that this photo had not been published and she did not know how Karyn could have acquired it, adding "I was scared by all these letters this 'Karyn' person got, since the picture is of me and I am alive!"

Spaight was unable to corroborate the circumstances of Karyn's death, reported as a crash on the E6 highway near Skogn between a Volkswagen and a test driven Porsche 911 that killed three people on 29 January 1998. He found that although a crash did occur there on that date, it involved a car and a truck and killed one older woman. In addition, though Karyn spoke Norwegian and claimed to be using her real-life name, her name would be very unusual in Norway.

Spaight ultimately speculates that Karyn may have been a male player experimenting with a female gender presentation who decided to discontinue that experiment, using a faked death to do so. After publishing his investigation to Salon.com, Spaight claimed to have identified a male player with Karyn but was unable to make contact. He reiterates that Karyn's actions "invite players to reflect on how their words and actions in a virtual world can affect real people in the real world."
