= Michael Seifert (programmer) =

Danish computer programmer (born 1969)

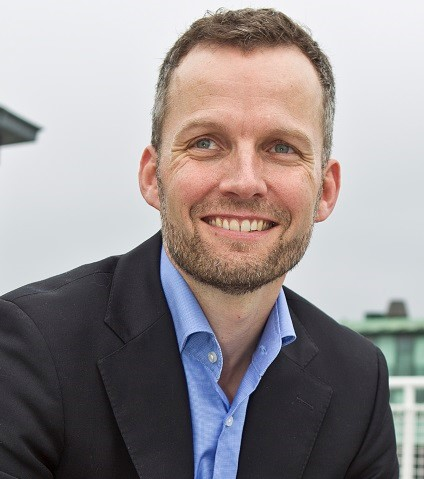
- Born: February 1969 (age 57); Copenhagen, Denmark
- Education: University of Copenhagen
- Occupation: Former CEO of Sitecore
- Known for: DikuMUD, Sitecore
- Awards: 2013 IT-Prisen

Michael Seifert (born February 1969 in Copenhagen) is a Danish computer programmer, inventor, businessman, and entrepreneur in the IT industry. He is co-developer of DikuMUD, a popular multiplayer text-based role-playing game codebase, and former chief executive officer of Sitecore, a global customer experience management software company, which he co-founded in Copenhagen, Denmark in 2001. In 2013 Seifert won Denmark's annual IT Prize (IT-Prisen) for lifetime achievement in the field of information technology.

== Early life ==
Seifert was born in Copenhagen, Denmark in February 1969 to Erik J. Thomsen and Kirsten Seifert, who divorced when he was two years old. His great-grandfather was Carl Seifert (d. 1935), a Danish blacksmith and manufacturer who was recorded in the Krak's Blue Book (Kraks Blå Bog) of well-known Danes in 1929.

Throughout his childhood and high school years, Seifert resided with his mother and two brothers on the Danish island of Bornholm. From the age of 11, Seifert spent summers and Christmas holidays in San Rafael, California with his father, who immigrated to the United States and founded the microcomputer products firm Sun-Flex Company, which was later sold to Xidex Corporation. There, his father co-invented an anti-glare device for computer terminals, which was awarded United States Patent number 4,253,737 in 1981. It was during the first summer holiday with his father that Seifert became interested in computers and wrote his first computer program. At age 15, with the help of a friend and his mother, Seifert started his first IT company, Danbyte, which imported computer disks to Bornholm.

From 1990 to 1996, Seifert attended the University of Copenhagen, where he received a Master of Science degree in computer science and an exam.art in human computer interaction. His 135-page university thesis, Evaluation and Implementation of Operating System Support for Multiple Network Interfaces was co-authored with Ole Sas Thrane and published in 1995. It was at DIKU (Danish: Datalogisk Institut, Københavns Universitet)—the department of computer science at the University of Copenhagen—where Seifert got involved in the DikuMUD project and also met the colleagues with whom he would later found Sitecore.

== DikuMUD ==
In June 1990 at DIKU, Seifert joined Hans Henrik Stærfeldt, Tom Madsen, and Sebastian Hammer (and later Katja Nyboe) to work on the development of DikuMUD, a multiplayer text-based role-playing game, which is a type of MUD. DikuMUD became one of the first multi-user games to become popular as a freely available program for its gameplay and similarity to Dungeons & Dragons.

At the time, DikuMUD was only available to university students with Internet access, so Seifert solicited funds from the Tuborg Foundation, run by Danish brewing company Carlsberg Group, in order to purchase modems and hubs to make DikuMUD more widely available to the Danish population at large. Seifert won the funds by putting a special Tuborg-branded drink into the game and awarded points to players who drank it (in the game).

Seifert and the team released the DikuMUD source code in October 1990 and it became the root of one of the largest trees of derived code from a MUD-like source code package. After the last official release of DikuMUD in July 1991, the team moved on to the development of DikuMUD II, which continues to run today under the name of Valhalla MUD.

After graduating, Seifert made efforts to commercialize DikuMUD and, later, start an online casino business, neither of which proved fruitful. In 1998, with fellow University of Copenhagen students Thomas Albert, Jakob Christensen, Peter Christensen, and Ole Sas Thrane, Seifert co-founded systems integration company Pentia A/S, from which Sitecore was later spun off as a separate business entity.

== Sitecore ==
Seifert started Pentia in 1998 as a systems integration company focused on Microsoft technologies. As consultants, Seifert and his team were hired to design and implement websites, among other things, for a number of large Danish international corporations. To make their jobs easier, Thrane had devised a set of automated tools and methods for developing and managing websites. At the time, making changes to a website required the expertise of a programmer or developer. The group recognized a growing demand for their website services and decided to turn Thrane's invention into a marketable product (that would today be classified as a content management system).

In 2001, Seifert and his Pentia co-founders spun off Sitecore as a separate business entity, which initially sold content management systems in the Danish market but has grown profitably into a recognized global provider of customer experience management software with more than 1,000 employees and competition that includes IBM, Oracle Corporation, Salesforce.com, and Adobe Systems. Seifert served as CEO and was initially joined by Ole Sas Thrane and Jakob Christensen.

In 2016, private equity firm EQT acquired a majority stake in Sitecore valued at $1.14 billion. Seifert served as CEO until 2017, when he was replaced by Mark Frost.

In 2014 Seifert was included in the Krak's Blue Book (Kraks Blå Bog).

== Awards ==
Seifert is credited as the co-inventor of a method for collecting human experience analytics data, which was awarded United States Patent number 8,255,526 in August 2012.

In 2013, Seifert joined the likes of Skype co-founder Janus Friis and Turbo Pascal author Anders Hejlsberg as a recipient of Denmark's annual IT Prize (IT-Prisen) for lifetime achievement in the field of information technology.
