= Lost Souls (MUD) =

- Developer: Project community
- Engine: LDMud
- Platform: Platform independent
- Release: 1990
- Genre: Fantasy MUD
- Mode: Multiplayer

Lost Souls is a MUD, a text-based online role-playing game set in a medieval fantasy world. It has an extensive history of technical innovation in its field and has received critical praise.

== History ==
One of several login screens that Lost Souls displays, this one depicting a chaotic plane called the Exoma.

Lost Souls was founded in 1990 by Michael "Almior" Rice and several associates. It distinguished itself early on with software features, then innovative among MUDs (and still less than ubiquitous), such as an overland-map-style environment, realistic combat, a language barrier, and a limb model for characters supporting anatomies significantly different from that of humans, that earned it positive critical response.

Subsequent developments have included the atman (an account system through which players can manage multiple characters, improving on the typical MUD arrangement where the character is the account), a detailed model of the physical makeup of objects and the organs of living beings, a 3D evolution of the "overland map" allowing free flight across the world, use of A* search for pathfinding (and publishing the code for doing so), a detailed skill model, an innovative system for psychic wild talents, accessibility support for vision-impaired players using screen reader software, and character development through exploration rather than combat.

Lost Souls was an early mover into the Web among MUDs, registering its domain lostsouls.org in April 1995, after previously maintaining a Web presence at lostsouls.desertmoon.com. As a result, it is one of the four sites cited in the LPMud FAQ (now a frozen document), only two of which are still online and MUD-related (the other being BatMUD's site). The game's Web presence has become an important part of its service offering, including an extensive, mostly player-edited wiki and spawning several players' character blogs.

In December 2019, Matthew "Chaos" Sheahan retired from his position as owner and lead developer of Lost Souls, passing the responsibilities to Wesley "Starhound" Reid.

== Game characteristics ==
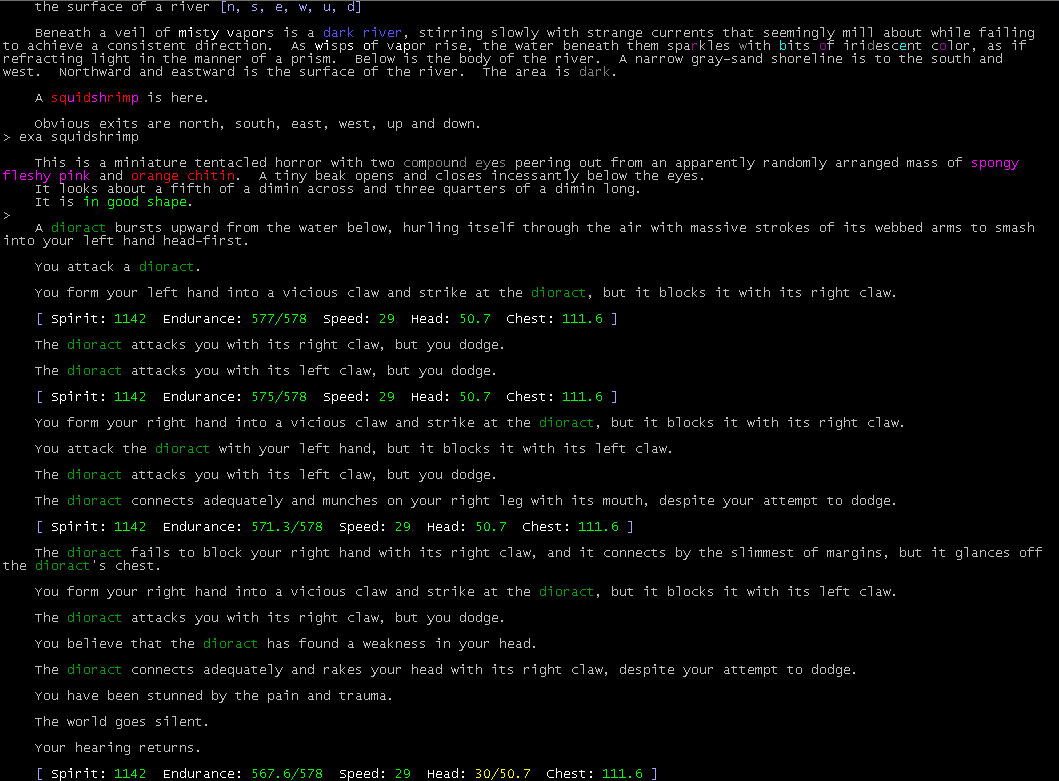
A screenshot from Lost Souls depicting a combat sequence.

=== Overview ===
Lost Souls, as typical for MUDs, is accessed through a telnet client or specialized MUD client. The interface is text-based, in what is often thought of as the Zork style. The basic game structure follows common RPG conventions, with characters fighting, exploring, and questing to gain experience, gold and items. Lost Souls's command structure and character model are unusually extensive for a game and are noted as presenting a considerable amount of information to be learned. This is a significant barrier to new players, though experienced players often see the learning curve as a rite of passage and appreciate the greater depth that the extensive system brings to their later gameplay.

=== Races ===
Lost Souls has a broad variety of races, some deviating wildly from the human baseline. Thirty-two can be chosen from by a new player, ten more are unlocked by normal play, and another nineteen can be played under exotic circumstances. Among the more unusual races are the nyloc (magickally created shadow-beings), zuth (giant centaur-shaped reptiles), rachnei (anthropomorphic spiders), and phaethon (bronze-skinned elves with wings of fire).

=== Affiliations ===
Lost Souls does not have the "character class" mechanic common to fantasy role-playing games; its nearest equivalent is guilds and associations, which are organizations that a character joins after creation. Most often, affiliations can be left as well, allowing the character to explore new avenues of development. These organizations are numerous and often highly idiosyncratic, offering abilities and challenges specific to the individual group. Examples of affiliations range from the Aligned, a group of artists and poets attuned to cosmic order, to Ordo Zephyrius Mutatoris, magicians who control air and weather, to the Erisian Liberation Front, Discordians described as "guerrilla theologians" who invoke an array of gods in the name of chaos.

=== Skills ===
The Lost Souls skill system is based on a value assigned to each of the character's attributes, such as strength, agility, and ego. The higher their attribute in a given area, more specialization points are available to allocate for a certain skill. For example, higher dexterity allows the user to allocate more specialty points to the use of swords. The more specialty points that are allocated for a certain skill, the faster the skill can be learned and improved. It also increases the maximum skill level the player can have for that particular skill. The intention of this is to allow for 'heroic' levels of capability to be achievable without the risk of a situation arising where everyone becomes equally, superhumanly capable at everything, since the system limits and promotes development of different skills at different times.

=== Psionic talents ===
The psionic wild talent system is particularly distinctive. Psi talents develop after character creation, during the normal course of play, through a number of mind-altering events that can potentially awaken them. They are initially latent, and come to full expression through being triggered by related events; for instance, the talent of making oneself psychically invisible may make itself manifest while one is trying to run away and hide from an opponent. Psi talents vary greatly in their strength and utility, and can add considerable complexity to a character.

== Influences ==
Lost Souls being played using TinTin++, displaying an annotated automap of the central city of Losthaven.

=== Fantasy literature ===
Like many MUDs, Lost Souls is heavily influenced by popular fantasy literature, with much content being visibly an adaptation of material from these sources. In the 1990s, this intermingling of fictional worlds into an arguably coherent whole was aggressively pursued by the game's developers. More recently, the creative direction has been toward the development of purely original content and the repurposing of adaptational content away from its third-party roots. Despite these efforts, Lost Souls retains the stamp of many literary and gaming influences, the most marked being Roger Zelazny's Chronicles of Amber, J.R.R. Tolkien's Lord of the Rings, and H.P. Lovecraft's Cthulhu Mythos.

=== Discordianism ===
Where the forces of chaos tend to be grim and demonic in many fantasy settings, in Lost Souls they often wear the face of Discordianism. Eris is regarded as the high goddess of chaos, and several affiliations - the Paratheo-Anametamystikhood of Eris Esoteric, the Erisian Liberation Front, and the Legion of Dynamic Discord - are drawn from Discordian works. These affiliations all share the ability to spout forth random quotations at will; these quotations are drawn from a central file that has grown considerably over time, and its occasional public postings have led to it becoming a widespread and recurring part of Discordianism. It appears that Discordianism's influence on Lost Souls has led, through no particular intention, to Lost Souls being an influence on Discordianism.

== Technical structure and publications ==
=== Driver ===
Lost Souls runs on the LDMud game driver, a branch of the LPMud family of MUD server software.

=== Mudlib ===
Lost Souls's core technical resource is its mudlib, the collection of LPC-language support functionality that forms the framework on which its content is built. The Lost Souls mudlib was originally referred to as LSLib, later being rechristened as Ain Soph, referring to the Kabbalistic concept. Its early technical innovations, until c. 1994, were primarily the work of Rebecca "Bectile" Willey, with work after her retirement being driven mainly by Matthew "Chaos" Sheahan.

The Ain Soph mudlib has not, to date, been publicly released, but other MUDs have been started using it, either through private agreement or through theft. Ain Soph MUDs started by private agreement include Costello, an English-language teaching environment, and the now-defunct MUD Lost Dawning, which was originally a tutorial-oriented "sister MUD" to Lost Souls but later separated completely in a politically driven project fork.

=== Publications ===
Though the Ain Soph mudlib is not public, Lost Souls developers do make efforts to contribute to the MUD and general programming communities. The "Lost Souls Grimoire" contains several such publications:

- An LPC-language A* search algorithm module
- Perl-language mass search and replace support
- JavaScript cross-browser Web form autofocus
- A diminishing returns formula in eight languages

Some Lost Souls LPC code is also occasionally released into the public domain via lpmuds.net. Such releases include:

- Lost Souls's "Services" mechanism, a method of accelerating LPC inter-object communication
- scan_for_destructed_objects(), a support function for LPC memory management
- LPC implementations of Levenshtein and Damerau–Levenshtein distance
- Lost Souls's "graph" command, for text visualization of mathematical formulae

== See also ==
- MUD
- LPMud
- LPC (programming language)
