= Brian Green (game developer) =

American game developer (1973–2020)

- Born: 1973
- Died: August 6, 2020 (aged 46)
- Other names: Psychochild, T'arl Nunh
- Occupation: Game developer
- Notable work: Meridian 59
- Website: psychochild.org

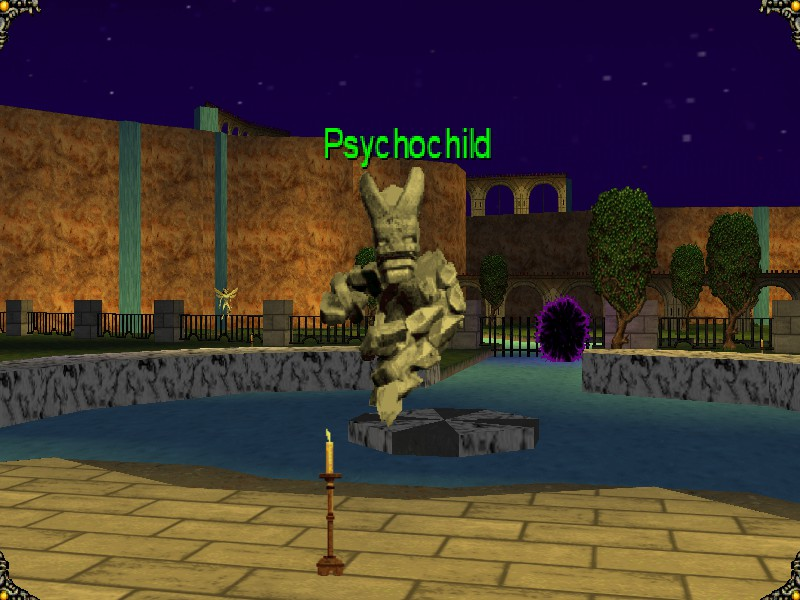
An in-game memorial statue to Green in the game Meridian 59.

Brian Green (1973 – 6 August 2020), nicknamed "Psychochild", was an American software engineer, game developer and game designer known for his work on one of the first 3D MMORPGs in existence, Meridian 59 (released 1996). Operated now by open source volunteers, the Meridian 59 servers continue operation after thirty years.

== Youth ==
=== Culture and education ===
He first used the pseudonym Psychochild (sometimes shortened to just "PC") on a multi-user dungeon (MUD) game called Genocide. But among his most favorite MUD's was Kerovnia, which he played avidly in college (as well as others, such as Highlands, Farside, and Astaria). As he describes:

I went to college and wasted many nights sitting in front of a green monochrome screen connected to the university's Unix network, typing in the text commands into a text game that had several people playing at once. This was a MUD, the greatest game I had ever played in my life. I spent whole, sleep-deprived nights playing the game instead of doing homework. I became a 'wizard', a person able to add to the game. Being a programmer, I quickly learned the coding language and began gleefully adding to the game. I think the only reason I passed some of my programming classes is because I had programmed on the MUD. If you are curious about the MUD I worked on, it is called Kerovnia. I'm sure a bit of searching will turn it up. The administrator is a great guy and very, very dedicated to the game. But, after working and playing on MUDs, I was hooked. How could other games compare? Venturing forth I finally graduated, and like most people I left MUDs behind. I didn't have time for them and my career!

His interest in online game development grew out of his experience as a "wizard" working on a MUD. A "wizard", in this context, was someone who played the game and was also actively allowed to edit the game, using the game's source code.

=== Origins of the name Psychochild ===
In an interview, he was asked the origin of his name, and said, "Back in the dorms, one guy I played Street Fighter with called me 'you psycho child' when I'd give a victory whoop, so I used that. The name stuck."

== Gaming development career ==
=== Beginning of Meridian 59 ===
Green worked on the game for 3DO, an American game company. After 3DO swapped interests to single-payment games, instead of subscription games, 3DO sold Meridian 59 to Green, who then co-founded Near Death Studios in 2001. In 2003, Green gave an interview about his newest developments in Meridian 59: "The biggest thing it allows us to do is show off the great artwork in Meridian 59," while detailing the active, hardware acceleration options in the new engine. Green's contribution to Meridian 59 is cited to span the period of 2001 to 2010.

=== Transition of Meridian 59 to open source ===
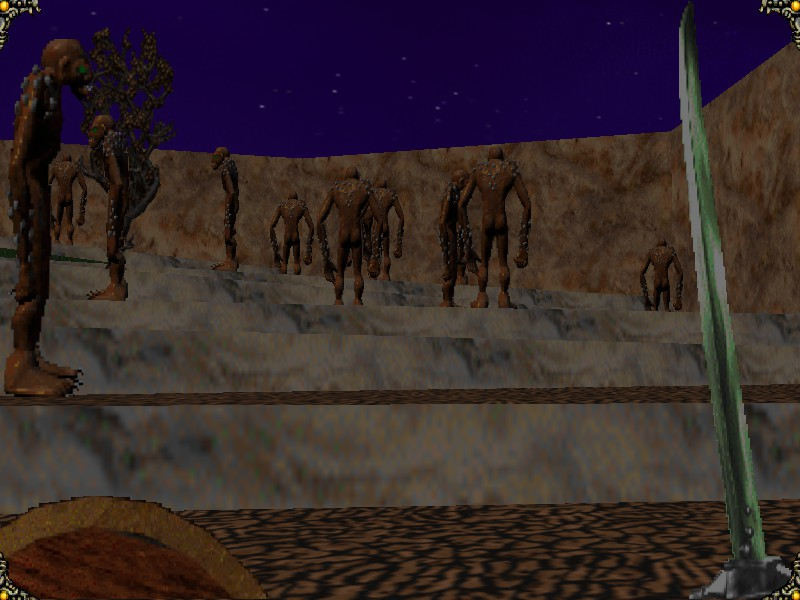
An "overcrowded" game of Meridian 59.

In the early 2000s, 3DO suffered massive failures after their releases of Army Men (1998) and a poorly-received Jurassic Park release Jurassic Park Interactive; 3DO immediately went out of business. 3DO considered offloading Meridian 59 to its original developers. Green and Q (another iconic developer personality associated with Meridian 59's perseverance) continued in trying to get 3DO to sell them the rights to Meridian 59, which was licensed to their new company, Near Death Studios.

The transition occurred officially in 2001. Before this transition, Green said that the Meridian 59 division of 3DO was "on life support" for the previous five years. Near Death Studios remained intact for another ten years until a volunteer team of open source developers took over maintaining and administering the servers for Meridian 59 (c. 2010). This open source development team holds steady until the present, with currently-maintained servers, active development on GitHub, free support, free service, and regularly-organized events (auctions, quests, parties, etc.).

=== After Meridian 59 ===
In a 2016 interview with Massively OP, Green was said to have been "one of the creators of Meridian 59," but that now he has been "since, having worked on Storybricks, EverQuest Next, and Camelot Unchained."

=== Storybricks ===
Green was a key part of the team behind Storybricks, a "toolset that allows users to tell stories in a computer RPG and share them with friends". Although a Kickstarter to raise funds for the Storybricks system was unsuccessful, the team worked with Sony Online Entertainment to integrate the system into their forthcoming game EverQuest Next. Green left Storybricks in early 2014.

=== Camelot Unchained ===
In May 2014, Green joined City State Entertainment on the Camelot Unchained team.

Green left City State Entertainment in April 2016.

== Gaming development social activity ==
=== Social networking ===
Green was a frequent gaming conference speaker and wrote for a number of game design websites, including GamersInfo.net. In early 2020, Green did consulting and legal expert work, and co-hosted a weekly podcast called "Grim Talk" about game development. According to Gamasutra's obituary for Green, after Meridian 59, he "took to sharing his knowledge, thoughts, and reflections on MMOs and beyond with other members of the game industry though his own blog posts while, recently, working on an unannounced online game." The Ancient Gaming Noob said "He was as involved in that [MMORPG] community as anybody and often made time to read and comment on blogs large and small that were interested in the genre." In 2012, he began contributing to StoryBricks, a story-building system for video games.

=== Publishing ===
Green was also co-editor with S. Gregory Boyd of the book Business & Legal Primer for Game Development, published by Charles River Media (2007) ISBN 1-58450-492-7, and was a contributor to the webzine Imaginary Realities.

== Legacy ==
=== Remembrances ===
Green died of natural causes on August 6, 2020, at the age of 46. According to the MMORPG magazine Massively Overpowered, "It's with a very heavy heart today that we report that Brian 'Psychochild' Green has passed away at a relatively young age...." noting his contributions in blogging, Storybricks, and EverQuest after leaving Meridian 59.

Green was remembered by the JeuxOnline.com French MMORPG community, which stated in an obituary, "If the MMO industry is still relatively young, it is nevertheless already losing some of its main pioneers."

=== In-game memorial ===
Green's digital memorial was held on Sunday, August 16, 2020, 2pm EDT, at the Vale of Sorrows, Server 101, ingame. The event was entirely recorded by numerous viewers. A temporary portal was set up so users could immediately teleport to the event without any travel, and after the service, users were presented with a portal to teleport back.

Active users at the ceremony were awarded masks of the xeochicatl creature, which were one of the creatures that Green had actively developed. Among the remembrances of the speakers, he was highly acclaimed for his contributions to podcasts, blogs, and other grassroots communication with the gaming community. A guestbook was allowed for users to write final condolences, which had been established as a permanent, unalterable book-item within the game, permanently fixed. Other permanent book-items became available, as well, such as the book at the Duke Arkadius Feast Hall, written by Green, detailing the game development of Meridian 59 and 3DO studios in the late 1990s.

== Credits ==
- Crusaders of Might and Magic (1999)
- Meridian 59: Evolution (2004) (Near Death Studios)
- The Saga of Ryzom (2004)
- March of the Living (2016)
