= Mudos =

Mudos may refer to:

- Mudos, the main continent in the Oddworld fictional universe
- MudOS, a variant of the LPMud computer gaming system
