= AberMUD =

Multi user dungeon server

- Developers: Alan Cox; Richard Acott; Jim Finnis; Leon Thrane
- Release: January 1989
- Written in: B, C
- Operating system: Unix-like
- Size: 224 KB
- Type: MUD server
- Licence: Open Source

AberMUD /ˈæbərmʌd/ was the first popular open source MUD. It was named after the town Aberystwyth, where it was written. The first version was written in B by Alan Cox, Richard Acott, Jim Finnis, and Leon Thrane based at University of Wales, Aberystwyth for an old Honeywell mainframe and opened in 1987.

The gameplay was heavily influenced by MUD1, created by Roy Trubshaw and Richard Bartle at the University of Essex, which Alan Cox had played.

In late 1988, AberMUD was ported to C by Alan Cox so it could run on Unix at Southampton University's Maths machines. This version was named AberMUD2.

In early 1989, there were three instances of AberMUD running in the UK, the Southampton one, one at Leeds University and a third at the IBM PC User Group in London, run by Ian Smith. In January 1989 Michael Lawrie sent a licensed copy of AberMUD3 to Vijay Subramaniam and Bill Wisner, both American Essex MIST players. Bill Wisner subsequently spread AberMUD around the world.

AberMUD3 was renamed AberMUD II by Rich Salz in February 1989 after he cleaned up the source code and ported it to UNIX.

In 1991, Alan Cox wrote AberMUD IV (unrelated to AberMUD 4) and then AberMUD V, which was also used, with graphical extensions, in the Elvira game by Horror Soft, a trading name of Adventure Soft. AberMUD V was later released under the GNU GPL.

AberMUD4 was improved by Alf Salte and Gjermund "Nicknack" Sørseth to create Dirt. Their May 1993 final release of Dirt 3.1.2 is used by most of the remaining AberMUD games on the internet.

AberMUD's legacy lives on in the three major codebases it inspired: TinyMUD, LPMud and DikuMUD.

== See also ==
- MUD
- Chronology of MUDs
- Wizard (MUD)
