= Alternate character =

Additional RPG player character

In role-playing games, an alternate character, often referred to in slang as alt, alt char, or less commonly multi, is a character in addition to one's "primary" or "main" player character. Players are generally not secretive about their alternate characters, unless having multiple characters is against the rules of the game, or in a role-playing environment where alternate characters might be judged by the actions of the primary character. In games where multiple characters are disallowed, enforcement of this restriction can be difficult, especially without specialized tools.

Typically, alternate characters are used less frequently than the "primary" characters, but sometimes players may use them just as often. They should be distinguished from completely unused (dormant) characters, which may even get deleted for lack of activity. Alternate characters can be used to try out the different abilities of different player races, or character classes. Also, one frequent use is to play characters of opposite gender. Frequently, people use alternate characters to "re-live" the game experience; high-level characters may end up running low on things to do, but deleting the character and starting completely over is often undesirable. Often, people create another character to see what new features have been added since they last were on a low level character.

The games typically allow alternate characters as long as they don't consume game resources excessively and are not used for cheating. Often, the servers have specific rules about the use of alternate characters. Most typical rules include the following:

- The player is limited to a certain number of characters.
- Only one character may be logged in at the time.
- A given player's characters are not allowed to interact among themselves in any way. Often this only includes interaction which has a tangible benefit (such as giving equipment or money to another character), but some even restrict in-character dialogue.
- Alternate characters must not be used to spy on another guild or faction.

== Multi ==
The term multi is a similar idea in that it is heard in a wider variety of genres, such as strategy games where players control something other than a character. Multi denotes the use of an alternate account to the advantage of the primary character, which many games consider cheating. Multis allow a player to explore more possibilities than he could with only his main character alone; for example, many role-playing games have classes (such as Fighter and Wizard) that restrict the gameplay (fighters cannot cast spells, for example), and a player may want to create several characters to explore all of the possibilities. Multis can also help a player accumulate loot for his main character more quickly. The act of playing several characters at once is called multiing.

Multiing creates several gameplay problems, especially if these characters begin to interact with each other. Weaker multis could gather items in several areas and send them to the main character, so that the main character would get much more loot than if he would search for it singly. In the games where multiing can get serious benefits for a player, it is looked down upon by purists and is considered a form of cheating. For example, in Kingdom of Loathing using multis for profit is a punishable offense.

=== Mules ===
One of the most common uses for a multi is to act as a beast of burden, a "mule", for a main character. Rather than using this character to actively participate in the game, the player who controls it just needs a way to hold and transport goods, and perhaps to obtain more of some resources which are limited for each character by the game rules.

Many gamers regard the need for or use of mules in a game as a design flaw. In the game Diablo II 'mules' are sometimes used to 'smuggle' items from Diablo II Classic to Diablo II: Lord of Destruction, the game's expansion—some items do not exist in both games. This type of smuggling is a one-way venture, as characters cannot make the return trip from Lord of Destruction to the 'classic version'. The use of mules in this manner circumvents the intended inability of characters to move freely from one version to the other, and some players consider this a 'cheat'.

However, the use of mules is not universally frowned upon. In fact, in games such as Final Fantasy XI, it may be considered a marketing scheme. Final Fantasy XI permits one character for the monthly rate, and additional characters for $1.00 per month, whereas most games provide multiple character slots for no additional fee.

The use of mules in Eve Online is commonplace for a variety of reasons, one common purpose is to allow players whose main character is involved in piracy to transport and trade the spoils of their piracy in high security trading systems, where the pirate character cannot legally venture. Another common use is as a disposable front for confidence tricks or other scams, that can be disposed of or otherwise deleted once the scam is executed, without tainting the reputation of the main character.

In games such as Ultima Online, EverQuest, World of Warcraft and Lord of the Rings Online, mule characters often specialize in 'trade skills'. These mule characters are used to manufacture high demand goods that can be used by the player's main account, sold for profit or traded to other players for other highly sought items. Characters used to create items in World of Warcraft however can't reach beyond a certain crafting skill level until their character level is increased; in Lord of the Rings online the most sophisticated recipes are limited to players who are able to earn faction reputation in end game areas only.

=== Multiboxing ===
Multiboxing or Two boxing, dual boxing, or multiplaying, is a method of playing multiplayer games where the player controls two or more characters at the same time. On MUDs (the predecessors of MMORPGs) this is easy to accomplish using a MUD client, and the practice is generally called multiplaying. The term box informally refers to computer, and this form of arrangements can be expensive, usually requiring two computers and two subscriptions for online games where necessary. Players may wish to play on two computers when it is difficult to play two copies of a game on the same computer, such as modern 3D MMORPGs. However, software designed for multiboxing 3D MMORPGs on the same computer is available as well. Many players often use a high powered gaming system with more than one monitor and a powerful video card to play in this fashion as well. Multiboxing describes a player that is running two or more characters simultaneously, but usually implies more than two.

The challenges multiboxing presents in multi-tasking as well as in rewards, usually reserved for group play, can make an otherwise tedious or boring game a rewarding experience.

== See also ==
- Internet sock puppet
