= James Aspnes =

American computer scientist

- Education: Carnegie Mellon University
- Scientific career
- Fields: Computer Science;
- Workplaces: Yale University
- Thesis: Wait-Free Consensus (1992)
- Doctoral advisor: Steven Rudich

James Aspnes is a professor in Computer Science at Yale University. He earned his Ph.D. in computer science from Carnegie Mellon University in 1992. His main research interest is distributed algorithms.

In 1989, he wrote and operated TinyMUD, one of the first "social" MUDs that allowed players to build a shared virtual world.

He is the son of David E. Aspnes, Distinguished University Professor at North Carolina State University.

== Awards ==
- Dijkstra Prize, 2020.
- Dylan Hixon '88 Prize for Teaching Excellence in the Natural Sciences, Yale College, 2000.
- IBM Graduate Fellowship, 1991–1992.
- NSF Graduate Fellowship, 1987–1990.
- Phi Beta Kappa, 1987.
