= DikuMUD =

Multiplayer text-based role-playing computer game from 1991

- Developers: Sebastian Hammer, Michael Seifert, Hans Henrik Stærfeldt, Tom Madsen, Katja Nyboe
- Platform: Unix-like
- Release: WW: 1 March 1991
- Genre: MUD
- Mode: Multiplayer

DikuMUD is a multiplayer text-based role-playing game, which is a type of multi-user domain (MUD). It was written in 1990 and 1991 by Sebastian Hammer, Tom Madsen, Katja Nyboe, Michael Seifert, and Hans Henrik Stærfeldt at DIKU (Datalogisk Institut Københavns Universitet)—the department of computer science at the University of Copenhagen in Copenhagen, Denmark.

Commonly referred to as simply "Diku", the game was greatly inspired by AberMUD, though Diku became one of the first multi-user games to become popular as a freely-available program for its gameplay and similarity to Dungeons & Dragons. The gameplay style of DikuMUDs is hack and slash.

Diku's source code was first released in 1990.

== Development and history ==
DikuMUD was created by the University of Copenhagen's Department of Computer Science among a group of student friends: Katja Nyboe, Tom Madsen, Hans Henrik Staerfeldt, Michael Seifert, and Sebastian Hammer. According to Richard Bartle, co-creator of the first MUD, DikuMUD's developers sought to create a better version of AberMUD. Unlike TinyMUD and LPMUD, which encouraged live changes to the virtual world, DikuMUD hard-coded its virtual world.

The making of DikuMUD was first announced on Usenet by Hans Henrik Stærfeldt March 27, 1990. At the time Madsen, Hammer, and Stærfeldt were the only developers, joined by Michael Seifert in June 1990. Stærfeldt stated that their intention was to create a MUD that was less messy than AberMUD, less buggy than LPMud, and more like Dungeons & Dragons. The first DikuMUD was in working development as early as October 1990 and officially opened publicly running at freja.diku.dk port 4000 on February 3, 1991.

A second DikuMUD appeared in January 1991, running at hayes.ims.alaska.edu. In March 1991, the first public version of DikuMUD, known as Diku Gamma, became available at beowulf.acc.stolaf.edu. Afterwards the DikuMUD at freja.diku.dk was shut down and the game and development moved to alfa.me.chalmers.se.

Other Diku Gamma MUDs appeared in March 1991 running at eris.berkeley.edu, followed by a multiprocessor version running at sequent.berkeley.edu. By early April 1991, there were DikuMUDs running at spam.ua.oz.au, goldman.gnu.ai.mit.edu, bigboy.cis.temple.edu, and elof.iit.edu.

Diku Alfa was released in July 1991 and the DikuMUD team hereafter continued with the development of DikuII. That version was however never released to the public but continues to run today under the name of Valhalla MUD.

On June 21, 2020, Michael Seifert released DikuMUD III for HTML 5 with Websockets. This is now the last official release of DikuMUD.

== Legacy ==
As a result of its easily operable codebase, several major standalone MUD codebases were spun out using DikuMUD's code, namely Circle, Silly, and Merc. In turn, Merc led to ROM (Rivers of MUD) and Envy), which each spawned their own codebases. One such derivative of DikuMUD and Merc was SMAUG (Simulated Medieval Adventure Multi-user Game).

It has been proposed by Raph Koster (lead designer of Ultima Online and chief creative officer of EverQuest II) that Diku has resulted in the greatest proliferation of gameworlds due to being the easiest to set up and use. He further pointed out that "Diku codebases did eventually popularize many of the major developments in muds", and that the Diku gameplay provided inspiration for numerous MMORPGs, including EverQuest, World of Warcraft and Ultima Online.

There was a minor controversy in late 1999 and early 2000 regarding whether the commercial MMORPG EverQuest, developed by Verant Interactive, had derived its code from DikuMUD. It began at the Re:Game gaming conference in 1999, where the Director of Product Development for EverQuest, Bernard Yee, allegedly stated that EverQuest was "based on Dikumud". He did not specify whether he meant the code itself was derived from DikuMUD, or if it just had a similar feeling. Some attendees had understood it to mean the former, given that the chief designer, Brad McQuaid was an avid player of SojournMUD and TorilMUD that was based on the Sequent DikuMUD derivative, and reported to that effect on Usenet. After the Diku group requested clarification, Verant issued a sworn statement on March 17, 2000 that EverQuest was not based on DikuMUD source code, and was built from the ground up. In response, the DikuMUD team publicly stated that they find no reason whatsoever to believe any of the rumors that EverQuest was derived from DikuMUD code.

=== MUME ===
MUME
- Developers: Philippe "Eru" Rochat, Claude "CryHavoc" Indermitte, Pier "Manwë" Donini, David "Nada" Gay, Gustav "Dáin" Hållberg, project community
- Engine: DikuMUD
- Platform: Platform independent
- Release: 1992
- Genre: Middle-earth MUD
- Mode: Multiplayer

MUME, Multi-Users in Middle-earth, is one of the early offspring of DikuMUD, created in 1991 by Philippe "Eru" Rochat, who was soon joined by Claude "CryHavoc" Indermitte, Pier "Manwë" Donini, and David "Nada" Gay. The game was built as an homage to J. R. R. Tolkien's world as described in The Lord of the Rings. MUME has since released several new versions, incorporating new changes and areas that recreate Tolkien's world in text format.

MUME enjoys a measure of popularity in the MUD world. MUME is included in The Historical DikuMUD List hosted on the official DikuMUD web site, marking it as one of the longest-running DikuMUDs. In a September 2000 interview Raph Koster, the lead designer of Ultima Online and the chief creative officer of EverQuest II, lists MUME as one of the games that influenced him as a game designer by "doing such interesting things with player conflict".

In April 1998, MUME was named MUD of the Month at The Mud Connector.

==== Technical details ====
MUME is based on DikuMUD. The core of MUME is written in C, while the mudlib (global critical code, such as game commands, justice system support and shop functionality) and game world (code for specific rooms, mobiles, and objects) are written in Mudlle.

MUME makes the standalone version of its building and scripting language, Mudlle, publicly available. Mudlle was created by David "Nada" Gay and developed by him and Gustav "Dáin" Hållberg.

MUME uses PowTTY, a client based upon Powwow (for unix) and PuTTY.

==== See also ====
- Chronology of MUDs
- Immortal
- Rent
- Consider
