= Michael Lawrie =

British computer expert

- Born: 17 April 1968 (age 58); Lytham St Annes Lancashire, England

Michael Lawrie (born 17 April 1968) is a British computer security and social networking expert known for many things ranging from running MUDs to accidentally being the world's first Cybersquatter. He lives in Cambridge, England where he created (and runs) the Cambridge Freecycle group, one of the largest in Europe.

== Early involvement in MUDS ==
While at the University of Leeds, he took over management of MUD1 at Essex University in 1987. MUD1 was the first online role playing world, played by text through X.25/PSS and later Telnet.

After its shutdown he carried on running MIST, another early virtual world, until he closed that down in 1991. Famous then simply as Lorry, he wrote the seminal guide for MUD management "Confessions of an Arch-Wizard". Years later he wrote a few updates to this explaining how it all worked in practice.

In 1988 he took over the AberMUD project for a year, running a standard distribution of the game at Southampton University, Leeds University and the IBM PC Users Group. He also managed a VAX based mud at St David's University College, Lampeter. Lawrie was the first person to send out the AberMUD source code to Vijay Subramaniam thus starting the proliferation of MUDs throughout the world.

== IRC ==
Lawrie has been involved in IRC (Internet Relay Chat) since it first left Finland and had his first IRC Operator on Vijay Subramaniam's IRC Server in 1989. Since then he has been heavily involved in IRC both in the UK and worldwide and was central in creating Ircnet when the European servers split away from EFnet.

== Public access systems ==
Michael Lawrie is an ardent supporter of free, public-access systems and servers and is deeply rooted in the history of such services and in the development and opening up of the internet in the UK. He was one of the management team of Edinburgh University's Tardis Project in 1987 and later managed HICOM, a joint project between the British Computer Society, the British Psychological Society, Digital Equipment Corporation and British Telecom into HCI and CSCW. HICOM's VMS system was open to anybody who wanted an account and as well as being famous for being the only machine that the hacker Kevin Mitnick ever had a legitimate account on. It was also the first public access Internet service provider in the UK.

== Career ==
In his non-online life Michael Lawrie started off as systems and security manager and computer misuse expert and is now a Commercial Security Consultant and threat assessment specialist. He has worked for a number of large companies and headed up the Commercial Security team at British Telecom.

Online he was the head of the Trust and Safety division at OkCupid

== Historical preservation ==
He is the owner of a huge collection of historical computers, calculators, peripherals, electronic games, and more than a tonne of technical documentation. It contains more than 200 microcomputers dating from 1968 onwards and a number of larger machines, including significant VAXes and old PDPs. The collection is not currently available for public view.
