= Kraks Blå Bog =

Danish biographical dictionary

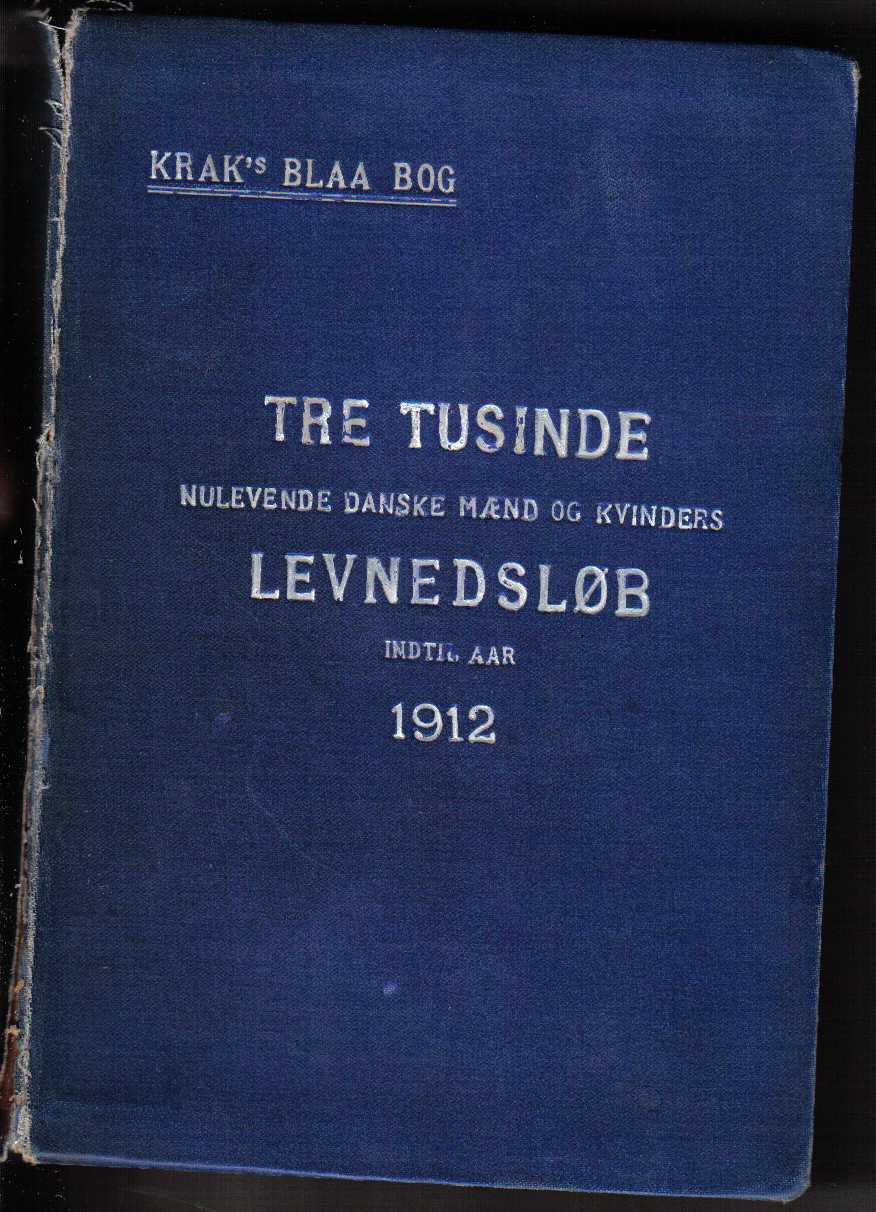
Kraks Blå Bog

Kraks Blå Bog (Danish for 'Krak's Blue Book') is a Danish biographical dictionary. According to the publisher, it only contains autobiographies provided by the subjects themselves.

The first edition was published in 1910 by Ove Krak and included 3,000 "life stories", while the 2009–2010 centennial edition contains life stories of 8,127 living Danish, Faroe Island and Greenland women and men. Including the 280 new life stories in the 2009/2010 edition, altogether 19,874 people have been listed since the first edition. The centennial edition includes a list of all present and previous names listed.

According to the publisher, the mission of Kraks Blå Bog remains the same through all editions: to "Include [...] men and women, whose life story could have an interest for a wider public." Selection is for life, except for people who commit certain crimes, which may lead to their deletion at the discretion of the publisher. People can also have their life stories "retired" if they become increasingly invisible in public life. In that case the life story is shortened to a few lines with a reference to the last edition with a full life story.

The preface to the first edition included a direct reference to the British edition of Who's Who and notes that the concept had been copied in a number of other countries. It also stresses that the publisher prefers the term "Life stories" to "Biographies" — which, according to the publisher, is more subjective.

The members of the selection committee are not publicly known, there is no obligation to buy the book in order to be included, and there is no way to pay to be included. Still, anyone is welcome to write the publisher and suggest people to be included. A main criterion has always been that the people included should have the potential to make "lasting" contributions to Danish society. For many years this excluded people such as sports stars, while holders of certain public positions such as generals and ambassadors were always included. This has gradually changed, and there are very few positions — such as members of the royal family (which are included in a separate chapter) — that automatically qualify for a "life story".

Men have dominated the listings since the first edition. In the 2004 edition 12% were women; however, 24% of all new life stories published were of women. As in many other countries, the concept of having a book with a strong focus on the ruling elite has led to many controversies. Besides the low number of women listed, these include people who do not want to be included or who demand to be included, people removed from the listings because of certain criminal acts, and the difficulties of publishing during and after the Second World War period of German occupation of Denmark.
