= Shattered World =

Shattered World is a play-by-mail game published by Jade Games.

== Gameplay ==
Shattered World is a game in which a computer-moderated game is set on the devastated planet Flindar. Players assume the role of Commander of the Tetralith, a massive hover-pyramid essential for survival after a rogue moon named Phosphor wreaks planetary havoc—triggering floods, earthquakes, and volcanic eruptions. The Tetralith requires a rare mineral to operate, prompting players to engage in combat or negotiation with miners, warriors, mutated humans, and alien creatures from Phosphor. A central mystery involves a plateau rumored to hold the key to the planet's salvation, which players must explore.

== Publication history ==
A promotional offer was extended to Adventurer readers for a discounted start-up pack in Shattered World.

== Reception ==
Wayne Bootleg reviewed Shattered World for Adventurer magazine and stated that "things look pretty grim! To survive, you need your Tetralith, and this needs a special mineral to function. Needless to say, this mineral is in short supply".
