= Alan Cox (computer programmer) =

British computer programmer

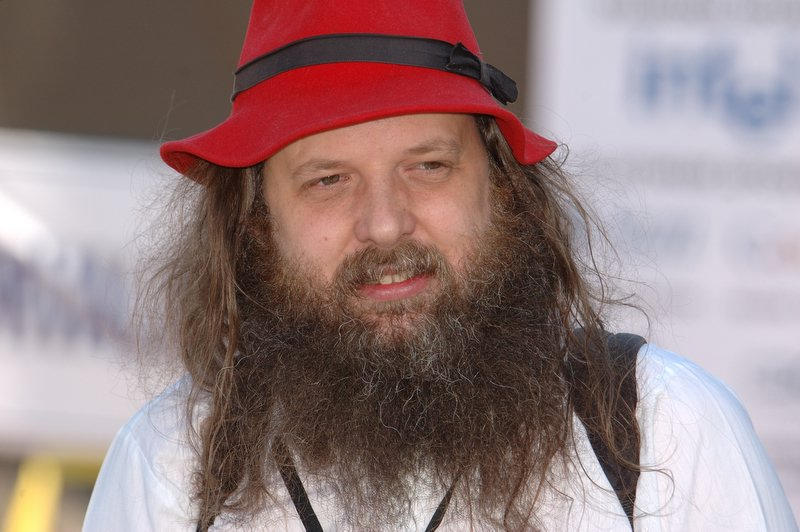
- Cox at FOSS.IN/2005
- Born: 22 July 1968 (age 58); Solihull, England
- Other name: ac
- Education: Swansea University Aberystwyth University
- Occupation: Programmer
- Spouse: Telsa Gwynne (d. 2015) Tara Neale

Alan Cox (born 22 July 1968) is a British computer programmer who has been a key figure in the development of Linux. He maintained the 2.2 branch of the Linux kernel and was heavily involved in its development, an association that dates back to 1991. He lives in Swansea, Wales, where he lived with his wife Telsa Gwynne, who died in 2015, and now lives with author Tara Neale, whom he married in 2020. He graduated with a BSc in Computer Science from Swansea University in 1991 and received an MBA from the same university in 2005.

Prior to his Linux work, Cox developed some video games for home computers, such as the text adventure Blizzard Pass.

== Involvement in the Linux kernel ==
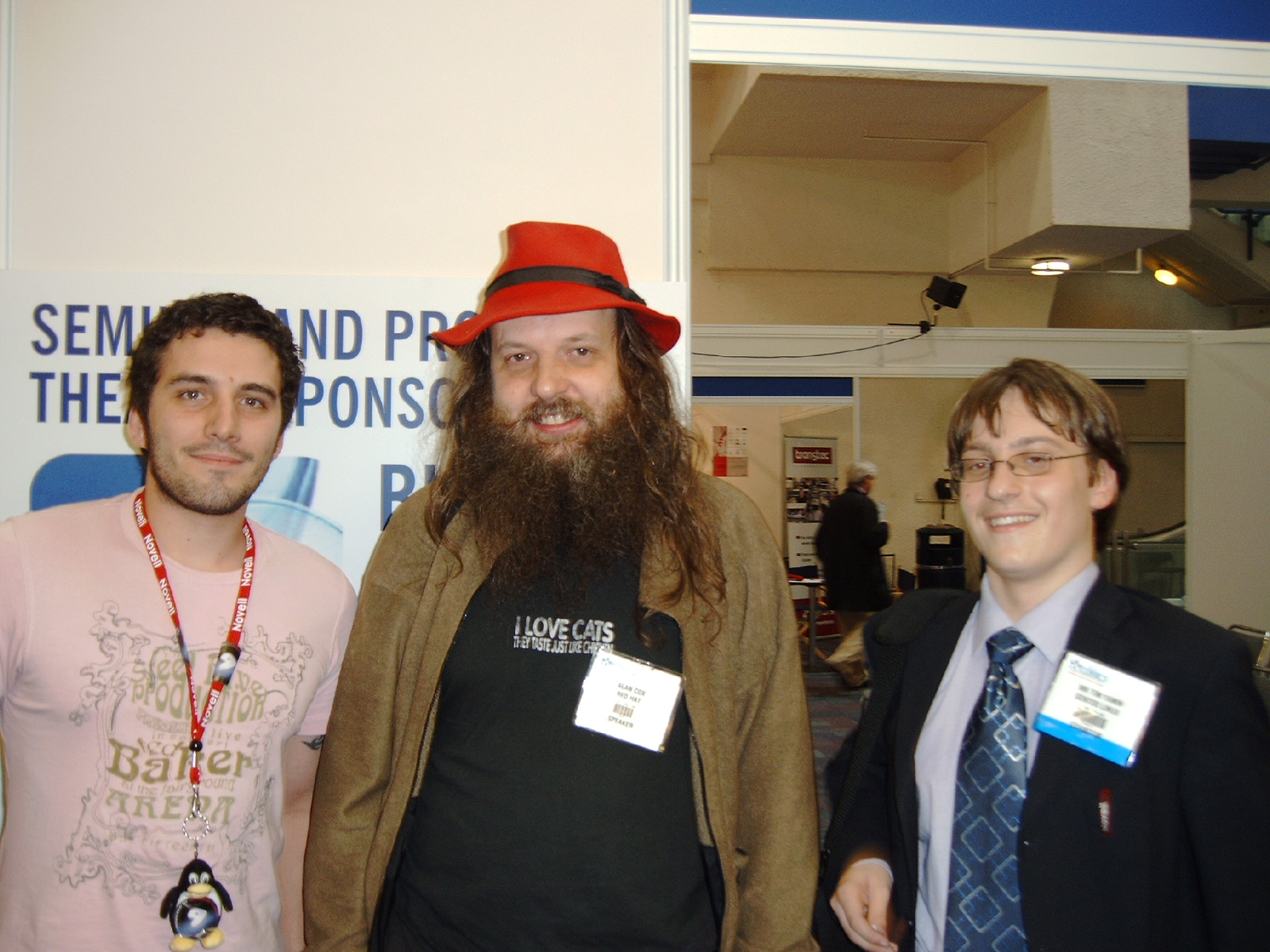
Alan Cox at the LinuxWorldExpo

While employed on the campus of Swansea University, Cox installed a very early version of Linux on one of the machines belonging to the university computer society. This was one of the first Linux installations on a busy network and revealed many bugs in the networking code. Cox fixed many of these bugs and went on to rewrite much of the networking subsystem. He then became one of the main developers and maintainers of the whole kernel.

He maintained the 2.2 branch, and his own versions of the 2.4 branch (signified by an "ac" in the version, for example 2.4.13-ac1). This branch was very stable and contained bugfixes that went directly into the vendor kernels.

Cox was once commonly regarded as being the "second in command" after Linus Torvalds himself, before reducing his involvement with Linux to study for an MBA.

On 28 July 2009, Cox quit his role as the TTY layer maintainer, after disagreement with Torvalds about the scope of work required to fix an error in that subsystem.

Alan was employed by the Linux distributor Red Hat during 1999–2009. Starting from 2011 he was employed by Intel Corporation, but he left both Intel and Linux kernel development in January 2013 to care full-time for his wife during a critical period of medical treatment, and returned to both later that year, until taking early retirement at the end of 2019.

He has also been involved in the GNOME and X.Org projects, and was the main developer of AberMUD, which he wrote whilst a student at the University of Wales, Aberystwyth.

On 31 Oct 2014, Alan Cox announced Fuzix OS, a tiny system V kernel, initially for Z80, on Google+.

== Model trains ==
Alan Cox used to run Etched Pixels, a model train company that used to produce N gauge kits until its closure in February 2023, the website citing "a huge rise in costs renewing things like insurance" as the cause.

== Activism ==
Cox is an ardent supporter of programming freedom, and an outspoken opponent of software patents, the DMCA and the CBDTPA. He resigned from a subgroup of Usenix in protest, and said he would not visit the United States for fear of being imprisoned after the arrest of Dmitry Sklyarov for DMCA violations.

In January 2007, he applied for a series of patents on "RMS", or "rights management systems". Red Hat Inc., Cox's former employer, has stated (in a document drafted by Mark Webbink and Cox himself) that it will not use patents against free software projects.

Cox is also an adviser to the Foundation for Information Policy Research and the Open Rights Group.

== Career and awards ==
Cox was the recipient of the Free Software Foundation's 2003 Award for the Advancement of Free Software at the FOSDEM conference in Brussels.

On 5 October 2005, Cox received a lifetime achievement award at the LinuxWorld awards in London.

The University of Wales Trinity Saint David Awarded Cox an Honorary Fellowship on 18 July 2013.

He received an honorary doctorate from the Swansea University, his alma mater, on 20 July 2016.
