= Genocide (MUD) =

- Developer: Project community
- Engine: LPMud
- Platform: Platform independent
- Release: 1992
- Genre: Pure PK MUD
- Mode: Multiplayer

Genocide is a MUD, a text-based online game, focused exclusively on player-killing. Founded in 1992, it was influential as the first such "pure PK" MUD, and has met with positive critical response. Genocide's ideas influenced a number of MUDs that emulated its pure player-versus-player orientation.

== Game characteristics ==
A screenshot from Genocide showing the War Complex.

Genocide's gameplay is based around "wars", sessions of PvP conflict, that restart at frequent intervals. Character progression as it is normally known on MUDs is completely absent, with the only advantages that experienced players have consisting of knowledge of the game structure. The social atmosphere on Genocide, not atypically of a highly competitive gaming environment, is noted as hostile and replete with crass language.

Genocide's setting is the "Island of Genocide", which is subdivided into domains and, within domains, areas. The world is vaguely medieval fantasy in theme, with a tremendous variety of character options available within that context.

Player character death on Genocide inflicts no lasting harm, but kill and death statistics are tracked, and the kill-to-death ratio is the main way in which relative social status of players is measured.

== Technical infrastructure ==
In 1992, Genocide served as a crucial development testbed for the MudOS LPMud driver, though in 1994, Genocide abandoned the MudOS driver and was ported to the main LPMud branch, citing speed concerns.

Genocide uses a game driver derived from the LPMud 3.2.1 server software, also known as the Amylaar driver. Its mudlib is homegrown.
