= List of MUD clients =

A MUD client is a game client, a computer application used to connect to a MUD, a type of multiplayer online game. Generally, a MUD client is a very basic telnet client that lacks VT100 terminal emulation and the capability to perform telnet negotiations. On the other hand, MUD clients are enhanced with various features designed to make the MUD telnet interface more accessible to users, and enhance the gameplay of MUDs, with features such as syntax highlighting, keyboard macros, and connection assistance.

Standard features seen in most MUD clients include ANSI color support, aliases, triggers and scripting. The client can often be extended almost indefinitely with its built-in scripting language. Most MUDs restrict the usage of scripts because they give an unfair advantage, as well as the fear that the game will end up being played by fully automated clients instead of human beings.

Prominent clients include TinyTalk, TinyFugue, TinTin++, and zMUD.

== History ==
The first MUD client with a notable number of features was Tinytalk by Anton Rang in January 1990, for Unix-like systems. In May 1990 TinyWar 1.1.4 was released by Leo Plotkin which was based on TinyTalk 1.0 and added support for event-driven programming. In September 1990, TinyFugue, which was based on TinyWar 1.2.3 and TT 1.1, was released by Greg Hudson and featured more advanced trigger support. Development of TinyFugue was taken over by Ken Keys in 1991. TinyFugue has continued to evolve and remains a popular client today for Unix-like systems.

TinyFugue, or tf, was primarily written for Unix-like operating systems. It is one of the earliest MUD clients in existence. It is primarily geared toward TinyMUD variants. TinyFugue is extensible through its own macro language, which also ties to its extensive trigger system. The trigger system allows implementation of automatically run commands.

Another early client was TINTIN by Peter Unold in April 1992. In October 1992 Peter Unold made his final release, TINTIN III, which was a much more mature and feature-rich program. Development of TINTIN was continued by Bill Reiss who announced the release of TinTin++ 1.0 in July 1993. The client gained popularity quickly because of its easy-to-use scripting language and the popularity of DikuMUD for which it was designed. Being open source with originally no license restrictions, many current clients like GGMud, MudMaster, and Pueblo are based on TinTin++.

Following on from TINTIN's success, Mike Potter was keen to produce a Windows port of the client resulting in the release of zMUD 1.0 in December 1995. zMUD was initially licensed as freeware, but Mike Potter realized that he could make a living from sales of the client and started selling zMUD 4.0 as shareware in September 1996. zMUD is particularly noted for its automapping capabilities.

== MUSHclient ==
MUSHclient
- Developer: Nick Gammon
- Stable release: 4.96 / December 2, 2014; 11 years ago
- Platform: Microsoft Windows
- Type: MUD client
- Website: mushclient.com

MUSHclient is a MUD client and peer-to-peer chat system originally written and maintained by Nick Gammon. The client is released as freeware. The source to the client is also available on GitHub.

=== Features ===
MUSHclient is highly flexible, and provides aliases, hotkeys, triggers (text-matching), command-execution timing, variables, multi-session support, ANSI-colour customisation and speed-walking. In July 2008, support for "miniwindows" was added, which allows MUD programmers to customize graphical elements to the screen, such as a map.

MUSHclient is compatible with screen readers such as JAWS, which read text out loud and allow blind users to play MUDs.

MUSHclient offers extensive scripting support via the Windows Script Host-supported languages, such as VBScript and JavaScript, as well as the platform-independent Lua-scripting. It also supports MCCP and MXP.

MUSHclient is also a peer-to-peer chat system using TCP/IP, featuring group calls and file transfers. This chat system is vulnerable to penetration attacks.

=== Portability ===
Although primarily written for Microsoft Windows, MUSHclient has been successfully run both under the Linux operating system by using Wine, and the Mac OS X operating system via Boot Camp and Parallels Desktop for Mac.

== QMud ==
QMud
- Developer: Panagiotis Kalogiratos (Nodens)
- Stable release: v10.04 / March 16, 2026; 6 months ago
- Platform: Linux, Microsoft Windows, macOS
- Type: MUD client
- License: GNU GPL v3
- Website: github.com/Nodens-/QMud

QMud is a Qt 6 port and continuation of the original MUSHclient (by Nick Gammon), designed and written by Panagiotis Kalogiratos (Nodens) of CthulhuMUD. It was released in March 2026 after being two years in development. It is compatible with existing MUSHclient data files and plugins, but it will migrate them to its own format in order to maintain separation.

Behavior aims for high compatibility with original MUSHclient persistence and Lua workflows while using a modern Qt C++ implementation. There are several improvements and new features implemented and a focus on going forward with future development of the client with modern technologies.

=== Features ===
QMud supports the original MUSHclient feature set with the exception of it deprecating all scripting languages that were supported via WSH (Windows Script Host) and maintaining only Lua for scripting which it has updated to 5.4. It has also dropped several dependencies of the original client in favor of native Qt implementations. Several new features are already implemented, such as split-pane scrollback buffer, autosaving, autobackup, log rotation and log compression, with many more on its roadmap.

=== Portability ===
Unlike MUSHclient, QMud is cross-platform, supporting Linux, Windows and MacOS with future plans for Android and iOS support as well.

== Savitar ==
Savitar
- Developer: Jay Koutavas
- Platform: macOS
- Type: MUD client
- License: BSD 3-Clause License
- Website: heynow.com/savitar

Savitar is a MUD client for macOS, originally released for the classic Mac OS in the late 1990s. Savitar 2 is a native macOS rewrite for modern versions of macOS and supports both Intel-based and Apple silicon Macs.

Savitar 2 is intended to provide compatibility with Savitar 1.6.3 world documents and settings, including existing triggers and macros. Its features include ANSI color output, triggers, macros, variables, command history, logging, speech output, multiple world documents and a built-in world picker. The software is open source under the BSD 3-Clause License.

== Operating systems ==
The operating systems the clients can run on.

Name	Windows	Mac OS X	Linux	BSD	Unix	Android	iOS
AMudClient	No	No	Yes	No	Yes	No	No
Atlantis	No	Yes	No	No	No	No	No
BeipMU	Yes	No	No	No	No	No	No
BioMUD	Yes	No	No	No	No	No	No
BlowTorch	No	No	No	No	No	Yes	No
CMUD	Yes	No	No	No	No	No	No
Dome Client	Yes	Yes	Yes	Yes	Yes	Yes	Yes
GGMUD	Yes	Yes	Yes	Yes	Yes	No	No
GMUD	Yes	No	No	No	No	No	No
Gnome-Mud	No	No	Yes	No	No	No	No
JamochaMUD	CPI	CPI	CPI	CPI	CPI	No	No
KBtin	No	Yes	Yes	Yes	Yes	No	No
KildClient	Yes	Yes	Yes	Yes	Yes	No	No
KMuddy	No	Yes	Yes	Yes	No	No	No
Lyntin	CPI	CPI	CPI	CPI	CPI	No	No
mcl	No	No	Yes	No	No	No	No
muby	No	CPI	CPI	CPI	CPI	No	No
Mudlet	Yes	Yes	Yes	Yes	Yes	No	No
MudMagic	Yes	Yes	Yes	Yes	Yes	No	No
MUDRammer	No	No	No	No	No	No	Yes
MudMaster2k16	Yes	No	No	No	No	No	No
MUSHclient	Yes	No	No	No	No	No	No
Portal	Yes	No	No	No	No	No	No
Potato	CPI	CPI	CPI	CPI	CPI	CPI	CPI
Powwow	Yes	Yes	Yes	Yes	Yes	No	No
Pueblo/UE	Yes	No	No	No	No	No	No
QMud	Yes	Yes	Yes	Yes	Yes	No	No
Savitar	No	Yes	No	No	No	No	No
SimpleMU	Yes	No	No	No	No	No	No
Sip	Yes	Yes	Yes	No	No	No	No
Smudgy	Yes	Yes	Yes	No	No	No	No
Soiled	CPI	CPI	CPI	CPI	CPI	No	No
TinTin++	Yes	Yes	Yes	Yes	Yes	Yes	No
TinyFugue	Yes	Yes	Yes	Yes	Yes	No	No
Tortilla	Yes	No	No	No	No	No	No
Trebuchet	CPI	CPI	CPI	CPI	CPI	No	No
Wintin.Net	Yes	No	No	No	No	No	No
zMUD	Yes	No	No	No	No	No	No

- CPI: Cross-platform or Interpreted software

== Protocol support ==
Information about what protocols the clients support.

Name	COLOR	VT100	TLS	NAWS	EOR	ECHO	MCCP	MXP	MSP	MMCP	256 colors	Unicode
AMudClient	Yes	No	No	Yes	Yes	Yes	No	No	No	No	Yes	Yes
Atlantis	Yes	No	Yes	Yes	Yes	No	Yes	No	No	No	Yes	Yes
BeipMU	Yes	No	Yes	No	No	No	No	No	No	No	Yes	Yes
BioMUD	Yes	Yes	No	Yes	Yes	Yes	No	No	No	No	Yes	No
BlowTorch	Yes	No	No	No	No	No	No	No	No	No	Yes	No
CMUD	Yes	Yes	Yes	Yes	Yes	Yes	Yes	Yes	Yes	No	Yes	No
Dome Client	Yes	No	No	No	No	No	No	No	No	No	Yes	Yes
GGMUD	Yes	No	No	No	No	Yes	Yes	No	No	No	No	No
GMUD	Yes	No	No	No	No	No	No	No	No	No	No	No
Gnome-Mud	Yes	No	No	No	No	No	No	No	No	No	Yes	No
JamochaMUD	Yes	No	Yes	No	No	No	Partial	No	No	No	No	No
KBtin	Yes	No	Yes	Yes	Yes	Yes	Yes	No	No	No	Yes	Yes
KildClient	Yes	No	Yes	Yes	No	Yes	Yes	No	No	Yes	Yes	Yes
KMuddy	Yes	No	No	No	No	Yes	Yes	Yes	Yes	No	No	No
Lyntin	Yes	No	No	No	No	No	No	No	No	No	Yes	No
mcl	Yes	No	No	No	No	No	Yes	No	No	Yes	Yes	No
muby	Yes	No	No	No	No	No	No	No	No	No	Yes	No
Mudlet	Yes	No	Yes	Yes	No	No	Yes	Yes	No	No	Yes	Yes
MudMagic	Yes	No	No	Yes	Yes	Yes	Yes	Yes	Yes	No	No	No
MUSHclient	Yes	No	Yes	Yes	Yes	Yes	Yes	Yes	Yes	Yes	Yes	Yes
MudMaster2k16	Yes	Yes	No	Yes	Yes	Yes	No	No	No	No	No	No
Portal	Yes	No	No	No	No	No	No	No	No	No	No	No
Potato	Yes	No	Yes	Yes	Yes	No	No	No	No	No	Yes	Yes
Powwow	Yes	Yes	No	Yes	No	Yes	No	No	No	No	Yes	No
Pueblo/UE	Yes	No	No	No	No	Yes	Yes	Yes	No	No	No	No
QMud	Yes	No	No	Yes	Yes	Yes	Yes	Yes	Yes	Yes	Yes	Yes
SimpleMU	Yes	No	No	No	No	No	Yes	No	Yes	No	No	No
Sip	Yes	No	No	Yes	No	Yes	Yes	Yes	Yes	No	Yes	Yes
Smudgy	Yes	No	Yes	Yes	Yes	Yes	Yes	No	No	No	Yes	Yes
Soiled	Yes	Yes	No	Yes	Yes	Yes	No	No	No	No	Yes	No
TinTin++	Yes	Yes	Yes	Yes	Yes	Yes	Yes	No	No	Yes	Yes	Yes
TinyFugue	Yes	No	Yes	Yes	Yes	Yes	Yes	No	No	No	Yes	No
Tortilla	Yes	No	No	Yes	Yes	Yes	Yes	No	No	No	Yes	Yes
Trebuchet	Yes	No	Yes	Yes	Yes	Yes	No	No	No	No	No	No
Wintin.Net	Yes	Yes	No	Yes	No	Yes	Yes	Yes	No	Yes	Yes	No
zMUD	Yes	Yes	No	Yes	Yes	Yes	Yes	Yes	Yes	Yes	No	No

- A locally ran MCCP or TLS proxy server can be used by clients that do not support MCCP or TLS natively.
- Many MUD clients will be able to display Unicode characters but will have wordwrapping issues without proper support.

== Scripting support ==
Name	C#	Client-Specific	Lua	Perl	Python	Ruby	TINTIN	VB.NET	Tcl	PHP	JScript
AMudClient	No	Yes	No	Yes	No	No	No	No	No	No	No
Atlantis	No	Yes	Yes	Yes	No	No	No	No	No	No	No
BeipMU	WSH	No	No	WSH	WSH	WSH	No	WSH	No	No	WSH
BioMUD	No	Yes	Yes	No	No	No	No	No	No	No	No
BlowTorch	No	Minimal	Yes	No	No	No	No	No	No	No	No
CMUD	WSH	No	Yes	WSH	WSH	WSH	Yes	WSH	No	No	WSH
Dome Client	No	No	No	No	No	No	No	No	No	No	No
GGMUD	No	No	Yes	No	No	No	Yes	No	No	No	No
GMUD	No	Minimal	No	No	No	No	No	No	No	No	No
Gnome-Mud	No	No	No	No	Yes	No	No	No	No	No	No
JamochaMUD	No	Minimal	No	No	No	No	No	No	No	No	No
KBtin	No	No	CLI	CLI	CLI	CLI	Yes	No	CLI	CLI	No
KildClient	No	No	No	Yes	No	No	No	No	No	No	No
KMuddy	No	Minimal	Yes	Yes	Yes	Yes	No	No	No	Yes	No
Lyntin	No	No	No	No	Yes	No	Yes	No	No	No	No
mcl	No	Yes	No	No	No	No	No	No	No	No	No
muby	No	No	No	No	No	Yes	No	No	No	No	No
Mudlet	No	No	Yes	No	No	No	No	No	No	No	No
MudMagic	No	No	No	Yes	Yes	No	No	No	No	No	No
MudMaster2k16	No	Yes	No	No	No	No	No	No	No	No	No
MUSHclient	No	No	Yes	Yes	Yes	Minimal	No	Yes	Yes	Yes	Yes
Portal	No	Yes	No	No	No	No	No	No	No	No	No
Potato	No	Yes	No	No	No	No	No	No	Yes	No	No
Powwow	No	Yes	No	No	No	No	No	No	No	No	No
Pueblo/UE	No	No	No	No	No	No	Yes	No	No	No	No
QMud	No	No	Yes	No	No	No	No	No	No	No	No
SimpleMU	No	No	No	No	No	No	No	No	No	No	No
Sip	No	No	No	No	No	No	No	No	No	No	Yes
Smudgy	No	No	CLI	CLI	CLI	CLI	No	No	CLI	CLI	Deno
Soiled	No	No	No	No	No	No	No	No	No	No	No
TinTin++	No	No	CLI	CLI	CLI	CLI	Yes	No	CLI	CLI	No
TinyFugue	No	Yes	No	No	No	No	No	No	No	No	No
Tortilla	No	No	Yes	No	No	No	Yes	No	No	No	No
Trebuchet	No	No	No	No	No	No	No	No	Yes	No	No
Wintin.Net	Yes	No	No	No	No	No	Yes	Yes	No	No	No
zMUD	WSH	No	No	WSH	WSH	WSH	Yes	WSH	No	No	WSH

== Notes ==
- WSH: Windows Script Host allows the execution of various scripting languages.
- Deno: Deno is a runtime for JavaScript, TypeScript, and WebAssembly
- CLI: command-line interface using redirection, not to be confused with system (C standard library)
- Many clients provide their own scripting language, sometimes in addition to another scripting language.
- Clients providing a modified version of the original TINTIN scripting language are listed as supporting TINTIN.
- MXP

In computing, MXP stands for MUD eXtension Protocol. It is used in MUDs to enhance the normal text output with a markup language loosely based on HTML and XML. In order for MXP to be used it must be implemented on the server as well as on the MUD client. MXP is in the public domain.
