= Player versus player =

Type of multiplayer interactive conflict

Player versus player (PvP) is a type of multiplayer interactive conflict within a game between human players. This is often compared to player versus environment (PvE), in which the game itself controls its players' opponents and is usually offline, whereas PvP tends to be online. The terms are most often used in games where both activities exist, particularly MMORPGs, MUDs, and other role-playing video games, to distinguish between game modes. PvP can be broadly used to describe any game, or aspect of a game, where players compete against each other. PvP is often controversial when used in role-playing games. In most cases, there are vast differences in abilities between players. PvP can even encourage experienced players to immediately attack and kill inexperienced players. PvP is often referred to as player killing in the cases of games which contain, but do not focus on, such interaction.

== History ==
Genocide, an LPMud launched in 1992, was a pioneer in PvP conflict as the first "pure PK" MUD, removing all non-PvP gameplay and discarding the RPG-style character development normally found in MUDs in favor of placing characters on an even footing, with only player skill providing an advantage. Extremely popular, its ideas influenced the MUD world heavily.

== Classifications ==
=== Player Killing ===
PvP can also create additional facets in the community. In Ultima Online and Asheron's Call, a rift formed between those who enjoyed PKing, those who enjoyed hunting the PKs and those who simply did not want to fight at all. The Renaissance expansion later added a Trammel facet where PvP was not allowed, giving some out to the UO crowd that did not wish to engage in PvP at all. Asheron's Call contained a server that was completely unrestricted in player interactions where massive "PK" and "Anti (PK)" dynasties formed.

==== Anti-Player Killing ====
Anti-PKing, also known as Player Killer Killing, PK Killing, or PKK, is a form of in-game player justice. Often motivated by an overpopulation of in-game player killers, vigilante Anti-PKs hunt Player Killers and Player Griefers with vengeance.

== RvR (realm versus realm) combat ==
In 2001, Mythic Entertainment introduced a new team-based form of PvP combat with the release of Dark Age of Camelot.

This was a new concept to graphical MMORPGs, but was first introduced in the game that preceded DAoC, Darkness Falls: The Crusade, which has since been shut down in favor of building on DAoC. Other MMORPG games now also feature this type of gameplay.

== Ethical issues ==
Player-vs-player dynamics involve ethical issues with players. Because of ganking, some game developers view PvP with contempt. Despite the advantage experienced players have over new players, many game developers have assumed an honor code would prevent PKing.

== See also ==
- Deathmatch (video games) – Video game mode
- Last man standing (video games) – Multiplayer deathmatch gameplay mode
- Player versus environment – Fighting computer-controlled enemies
