= Quest (video games) =

Player task in video games

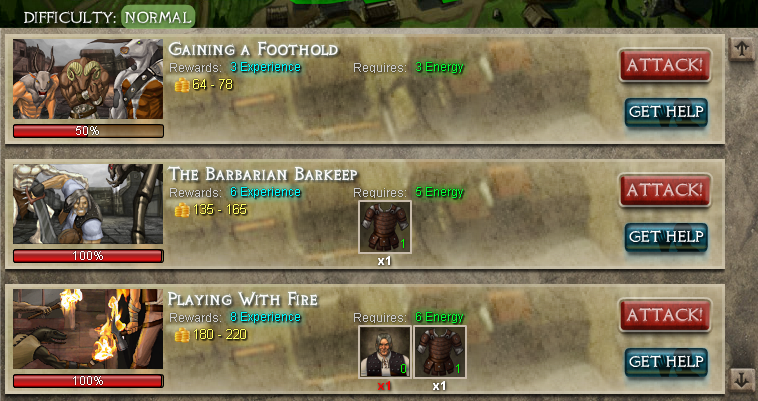
Selection interface in Dawn of the Dragons, each quest having different requirements and rewards

A quest or mission is a task within video games that a player-controlled character, party, or group of characters may complete in order to gain a reward. Quests are most commonly seen in role-playing games and massively multiplayer online games. Rewards may include loot such as items or in-game currency, access to new level locations or areas, an increase in the character's experience in order to learn new skills and abilities, or any combination of the above.

Quests often fall into several types, such as kill quests, gather quests, delivery/"fetch" quests, and escort quests. However, quests can include more than one mission, such as gathering something and transporting it somewhere. Quests can be linked together to form quest series or chains. In this manner, quests are used to provide the player with further background to the setting their characters are in. This mechanism is also used to advance any story or plot the game might have.

Many types of quests are referred to as "sidequests". These are quests which deviate from the main plot and are not required to complete the game.

== Overview ==
In the most general sense, a quest is a "hunt for a specific outcome", in contrast to simply winning a game. Typical quests involve killing a set number of creatures or collecting a list of specific items. Some quests may take only a few minutes or hours to complete, while others may take several days or weeks. Often, the larger the reward, the longer the quest takes to finish, and it is common for a quest to require characters to have met a certain set of pre-conditions before they are allowed to begin.

Questing is a tool used in role-playing games to avoid putting players in a position where they only perform a repetitive action, such as killing creatures. Players may be performing this activity in order to gain new skills and progress to new areas, or to gain in-game money in order to buy new items, such as armor and equipment. This process, commonly known as "grinding", can slow down a character's progression in the game and ultimately limit the player's enjoyment. Having a number of quests for characters to tackle is seen as a way to provide variety, and to counter the need to grind in these types of games.

A sidequest is an optional section of a video game, and is commonly found in role-playing video games. It is a smaller mission within a larger storyline, and can be used as a means to provide non-linear structures to an otherwise linear plot. As a general rule, the completion of sidequests is not essential for the game to be finished, but can bring various benefits to the player characters.

== Common quest types ==
=== Kill quests ===
A kill quest sends the character out to kill either a specific number of named creatures, or a specific NPC (non-player character). These types of quests often require the character to bring back proof of their work, such as trophies, or body parts (boar tusks, wolf pelts, etc.).

=== Combo quests ===
The combo quest requires a player to attack certain enemies or structures with a combination of attacks until the required number of combos is reached. Enemies in these quests are usually either immortal or infinite in number, until the player is successful. At this point, the enemies would either be killed, or stop appearing.

=== Delivery quests ===
Another type of quest is the delivery quest, also known as a FedEx quest or fetch-carry quest. This involves the character being sent to deliver an item from one location to another. Sometimes, the character may need to collect the item first, instead of being handed the item to deliver when starting the quest. These quests are made challenging by asking the character to journey through unfamiliar or dangerous terrain, sometimes while facing a time limit.

=== Gather quests ===
Gather quests, also known as collection quests or fetch quests, require a character to collect a number of items. These can either be gathered from a location or environment, or require the character to kill creatures in order to collect the required items. The quest may also require the character to collect a number of different items, for example to assemble a device.

=== Escort quests ===
The Escort quest is a combination of killing enemies to maintain the well-being of a non-player character (NPC), while exploring an area alongside that NPC. A typical escort quest would involve protecting a character as it moves through an enemy-infested area. A majority of the time, the quest will demand the player to slay multiple enemies to ensure the safety of the NPC. Escort quests can be beneficial, forcing the players to focus on a particular area in order to play out a scene or reveal a section of the plot. Escort quests can also be used to funnel a character from one location to another, leading the player along a route or path. However, problems with this type of quest can occur if the artificial intelligence controlling the NPC causes the NPC to behave in unexpected or unmanageable ways. Because many escort quests are often perceived as being poorly done, they are very unpopular amongst the gaming community.

=== Syntax quests ===
A phenomenon unique to text-based games, syntax quests depend on guessing the correct syntax to carry out a (typically simple) operation.

=== Hybrid quests ===
Elements from the above types can be combined to make more complex quests. For example, a quest could require that the player find the parts needed to assemble a specific weapon (Gather Quest), and then use these parts to kill a specific foe (Kill quest). Hybrid quests may also include puzzles and riddles.

== Quest chains ==
A quest chain is a group of quests that are completed in sequence. Quest chains are also known as quest lines. Completion of each quest is a prerequisite to beginning the next quest in the chain. Quests usually increase in difficulty as a player progresses through the chain. The quests typically reveal a single plotline in stages, where events during the stages of the plotline explain the reason or reasons for the different quests. Quest chains can also start with opening or breadcrumb quests, in order to encourage characters to journey to a new area, where further elements of the quest chain are revealed. Through mechanisms like these, the setting of a particular location is explained to the player, with the plot or storyline being disclosed as the character progresses.

== See also ==
- MacGuffin
- Nonlinear gameplay
- Quest
