= Multi-user dungeon =

Video game genre

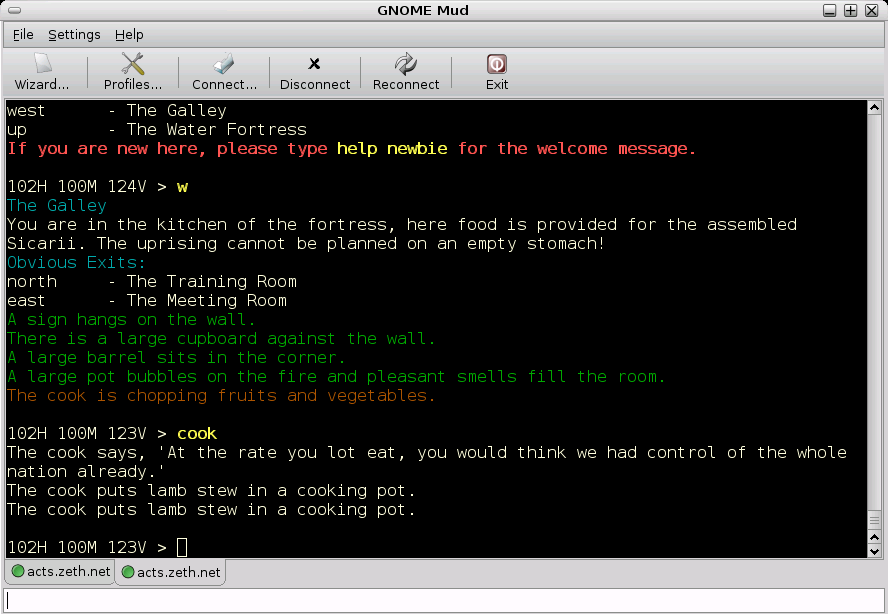
A screenshot of a MUD

A multi-user dungeon (MUD, /mʌd/), also known as a multi-user dimension or multi-user domain, is a multiplayer real-time virtual world, usually text-based or storyboarded. MUDs combine elements of role-playing games, hack and slash, player versus player, interactive fiction, and online chat. Players can read or view descriptions of rooms, objects, other players, and non-player characters, and perform actions in the virtual world that are typically also described. Players typically interact with each other and the world by typing commands that resemble a natural language, as well as using a character typically called an avatar.

Traditional MUDs implement a role-playing video game set in a fantasy world populated by fictional races and monsters, with players choosing classes in order to gain specific skills or powers. The objective of this sort of game is to slay monsters, explore a fantasy world, complete quests, go on adventures, create a story by roleplaying, and advance the created character. Many MUDs were fashioned around the dice-rolling rules of the Dungeons & Dragons series of games.

Such fantasy settings for MUDs are common, while many others have science fiction settings or are based on popular books, movies, animations, periods of history, worlds populated by anthropomorphic animals, and so on. Not all MUDs are games; some are designed for educational purposes, while others are purely chat environments, and the flexible nature of many MUD servers leads to their occasional use in areas ranging from computer science research to geoinformatics to medical informatics to analytical chemistry. MUDs have attracted the interest of academic scholars from many fields, including communications, sociology, law, and economics. At one time, there was interest from the United States military in using them for teleconferencing.

Most MUDs are run as hobbies and are free to play; some may accept donations or allow players to purchase virtual items, while others charge a monthly subscription fee. MUDs can be accessed via standard telnet clients, or specialized MUD clients, which are designed to improve the user experience. Numerous games are listed at various web portals, such as The Mud Connector.

The history of modern massively multiplayer online role-playing games (MMORPGs) like EverQuest and Ultima Online, and related virtual world genres such as the social virtual worlds exemplified by Second Life, can be traced directly back to the MUD genre. Indeed, before the invention of the term MMORPG, games of this style were simply called graphical MUDs. A number of influential MMORPG designers began as MUD developers and/or players (such as Raph Koster, Brad McQuaid, Matt Firor, and Brian Green) or were involved with early MUDs (like Mark Jacobs and J. Todd Coleman).

== Early history ==
=== Origins ===
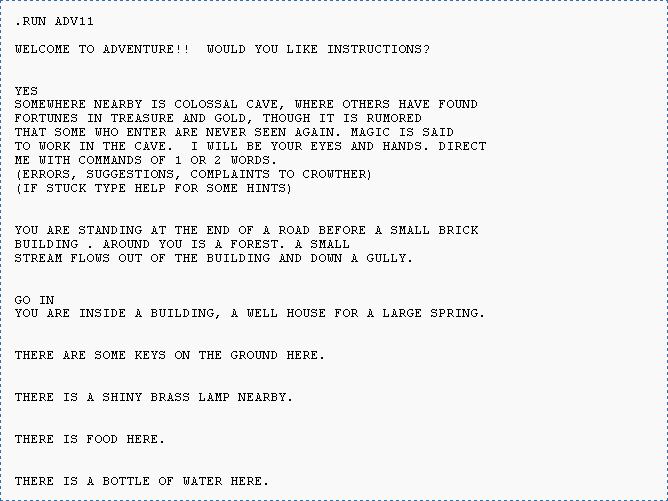
Will Crowther's Adventure

Colossal Cave Adventure, created in 1975 by Will Crowther on a DEC PDP-10 computer, was the first widely played adventure game. The game was significantly expanded in 1976 by Don Woods. Also called Adventure, it contained many D&D features and references, including a computer controlled dungeon master.

Numerous dungeon crawlers were created on the PLATO system at the University of Illinois and other American universities that used PLATO, beginning in 1975. Among them were "pedit5", "oubliette", "moria", "avatar", "krozair", "dungeon", "dnd", "crypt", and "drygulch". By 1978–79, these games were heavily in use on various PLATO systems, and exhibited a marked increase in sophistication in terms of 3D graphics, storytelling, user involvement, team play, and depth of objects and monsters in the dungeons.

Inspired by Adventure, a group of students at MIT in the summer of 1977 wrote a game for the PDP-10 minicomputer; called Zork, it became quite popular on the ARPANET. Zork was ported, under the filename DUNGEN ("dungeon"), to FORTRAN by a programmer working at DEC in 1978.

In 1978 Roy Trubshaw, a student at the University of Essex in the UK, started working on a multi-user adventure game in the MACRO-10 assembly language for a DEC PDP-10. He named the game MUD (Multi-User Dungeon), in tribute to the Dungeon variant of Zork, which Trubshaw had greatly enjoyed playing. Trubshaw converted MUD to BCPL (the predecessor of C), before handing over development to Richard Bartle, a fellow student at the University of Essex, in 1980. The game revolved around gaining points till one achieved the Wizard rank, giving the character immortality and special powers over mortals.

=== Wider access and early derivatives ===
MUD, better known as Essex MUD and MUD1 in later years, ran on the University of Essex network, and became more widely accessible when a guest account was set up that allowed users on JANET (a British academic X.25 computer network) to connect on weekends and between the hours of 2 AM and 8 AM on weekdays. It became the first Internet multiplayer online role-playing game in 1980 and started the online gaming industry as a whole when the university connected its internal network to ARPANET.

The original MUD game was closed down in late 1987, reportedly under pressure from CompuServe, to whom Richard Bartle had licensed the game. This left MIST, a derivative of MUD1 with similar gameplay, as the only remaining MUD running on the University of Essex network, becoming one of the first of its kind to attain broad popularity. MIST ran until the machine that hosted it, a PDP-10, was superseded in early 1991.

1985 saw the origin of a number of projects inspired by the original MUD. These included Gods by Ben Laurie, a MUD1 clone that included online creation in its endgame, and which became a commercial MUD in 1988; and MirrorWorld, a tolkienesque MUD started by Pip Cordrey who gathered some people on a BBS he ran to create a MUD1 clone that would run on a home computer.

Neil Newell, an avid MUD1 player, started programming his own MUD called SHADES during Christmas 1985, because MUD1 was closed down during the holidays. Starting out as a hobby, SHADES became accessible in the UK as a commercial MUD via British Telecom's Prestel and Micronet networks. A scandal on SHADES led to the closure of Micronet, as described in Indra Sinha's net-memoir, The Cybergypsies.

At the same time, Compunet started a project named Multi-User Galaxy Game as a science fiction alternative to MUD1, a copy of which they were running on their system at the time. When one of the two programmers left CompuNet, the remaining programmer, Alan Lenton, decided to rewrite the game from scratch and named it Federation II (at the time no Federation I existed). The MUD was officially launched in 1989. Federation II was later picked up by AOL, where it became known simply as Federation: Adult Space Fantasy. Federation later left AOL to run on its own after AOL began offering unlimited service.

=== Other early MUD-like games ===
In 1978, around the same time Roy Trubshaw wrote MUD, Alan E. Klietz wrote a game called Scepter (Scepter of Goth), and later called Milieu using Multi-Pascal on a CDC Cyber 6600 series mainframe which was operated by the Minnesota Educational Computing Consortium. Klietz ported Milieu to an IBM XT in 1983, naming the new port Scepter of Goth. Scepter supported 10 to 16 simultaneous users, typically connecting in by modem. It was the first commercial MUD; franchises were sold to a number of locations. Scepter was first owned and run by GamBit (of Minneapolis, Minnesota), founded by Bob Alberti. GamBit's assets were later sold to Interplay Productions.

In 1984, Mark Peterson wrote The Realm of Angmar, beginning as a clone of Scepter of Goth. In 1994, Peterson rewrote The Realm of Angmar, adapting it to MS-DOS (the basis for many dial-in BBS systems), and renamed it Swords of Chaos. For a few years this was a popular form of MUD, hosted on a number of BBS systems, until widespread Internet access eliminated most BBSes.

In 1984, Mark Jacobs created and deployed a commercial gaming site, Gamers World. The site featured two games coded and designed by Jacobs, a MUD called Aradath (which was later renamed, upgraded and ported to GEnie as Dragon's Gate) and a 4X science-fiction game called Galaxy, which was also ported to GEnie. At its peak, the site had about 100 monthly subscribers to both Aradath and Galaxy. GEnie was shut down in the late 1990s, although Dragon's Gate was later brought to AOL before it was finally released on its own. Dragon's Gate was closed on February 10, 2007.

In the summer of 1980, University of Virginia classmates John Taylor and Kelton Flinn wrote Dungeons of Kesmai, a six player game inspired by Dungeons & Dragons which used roguelike ASCII graphics. They founded the Kesmai company in 1982 and in 1985 an enhanced version of Dungeons of Kesmai, Island of Kesmai, was launched on CompuServe. Later, its 2-D graphical descendant Legends of Kesmai was launched on AOL in 1996. The games were retired commercially in 2000.

The popularity of MUDs of the University of Essex tradition escalated in the United States during the late 1980s when affordable personal computers with 300 to 2400 bit/s modems enabled role-players to log into multi-line BBSs and online service providers such as CompuServe. During this time it was sometimes said that MUD stands for "Multi Undergraduate Destroyer" due to their popularity among college students and the amount of time devoted to them.

Avalon: The Legend Lives was published by Yehuda Simmons in 1989. It was the first persistent game world of its kind without the traditional hourly resets and points-based puzzle solving progression systems. Avalon introduced equilibrium and balance (cooldowns), skill-based player vs player combat and concepts such as player-run governments and player housing.

=== Later history ===
In 2004, significant usages of MUDs included "online gaming, education,...socializing", and religious rituals or other religious activities.

== Popular variants ==
=== AberMUD ===
The first popular MUD codebase was AberMUD, written in 1987 by Alan Cox, named after the University of Wales, Aberystwyth. Alan Cox had played the original University of Essex MUD, and the gameplay was heavily influenced by it. AberMUD was initially written in B for a Honeywell L66 mainframe under GCOS3/TSS. In late 1988 it was ported to C, which enabled it to spread rapidly to many Unix platforms upon its release in 1989. AberMUD's popularity resulted in several inspired works, the most notable of which were TinyMUD, LPMud, and DikuMUD.

=== TinyMUD ===
Monster was a multi-user adventure game created by Richard Skrenta for the VAX and written in VMS Pascal. It was publicly released in November 1988. Monster was disk-based and modifications to the game were immediate. Monster pioneered the approach of allowing players to build the game world, setting new puzzles or creating dungeons for other players to explore. Monster, which comprised about 60,000 lines of code, had many features which appeared to be designed to allow Colossal Cave Adventure to work in it. Though there never were many network-accessible Monster servers, it inspired James Aspnes to create a stripped-down version of Monster which he called TinyMUD.

TinyMUD, written in C and released in late 1989, spawned a number of descendants, including TinyMUCK and TinyMUSH. TinyMUCK version 2 contained a full programming language named MUF (Multi-User Forth), while MUSH greatly expanded the command interface. To distance itself from the combat-oriented traditional MUDs it was said that the "D" in TinyMUD stood for Multi-User "Domain" or "Dimension"; this, along with the eventual popularity of acronyms other than MUD (such as MUCK, MUSH, MUSE, and so on) for this kind of server, led to the eventual adoption of the term MU* to refer to the TinyMUD family. UberMUD, UnterMUD, and MOO were inspired by TinyMUD but are not direct descendants.

TinyMUD is also used to refer to the first database run under the TinyMUD codebase, which is also known as TinyMUD Classic; it ran from August 1989 to April 1990, and still comes back up every August during a holiday called Brigadoon Day, a reference to the Scottish village in the musical Brigadoon.

=== LPMud ===
In 1989, LPMud was developed by Lars Pensjö (hence the LP in LPMud). Pensjö had been an avid player of TinyMUD and AberMUD and wanted to create a world with the flexibility of TinyMUD and the gameplay of AberMUD. In order to accomplish this he wrote what is nowadays known as a virtual machine, which he called the LPMud driver, that ran the C-like LPC programming language used to create the game world. Pensjö's interest in LPMud eventually waned and development was carried on by others such as Jörn "Amylaar" Rennecke, Felix "Dworkin" Croes, Tim "Beek" Hollebeek and Lars Düning. During the early 1990s, LPMud was one of the most popular MUD codebases. Descendants of the original LPMud include MudOS, DGD, SWLPC, FluffOS, and the Pike (programming language), the latter the work of long-time LPMud developer Fredrik "Profezzorn" Hübinette.

=== DikuMUD ===
In 1990, the release of DikuMUD, which was inspired by AberMUD, led to a virtual explosion of hack and slash MUDs based upon its code. DikuMUD inspired numerous derivative codebases, including CircleMUD, Merc, ROM, SMAUG, and GodWars. The original Diku team comprised Sebastian Hammer, Tom Madsen, Katja Nyboe, Michael Seifert, and Hans Henrik Staerfeldt. DikuMUD had a key influence on the early evolution of the MMORPG genre, with EverQuest (created by avid DikuMUD player Brad McQuaid) displaying such Diku-like gameplay that Verant developers were made to issue a sworn statement that no actual DikuMUD code was incorporated.

=== Simutronics ===
In 1987, David Whatley, having previously played Scepter of Goth and Island of Kesmai, founded Simutronics with Tom and Susan Zelinski. In the same year they demonstrated a prototype of GemStone to GEnie. After a short-lived instance of GemStone II, GemStone III was officially launched in February 1990. GemStone III became available on AOL in September 1995, followed by the release of DragonRealms in February 1996. By the end of 1997 GemStone III and DragonRealms had become the first and second most played games on AOL.

== Gameplay ==
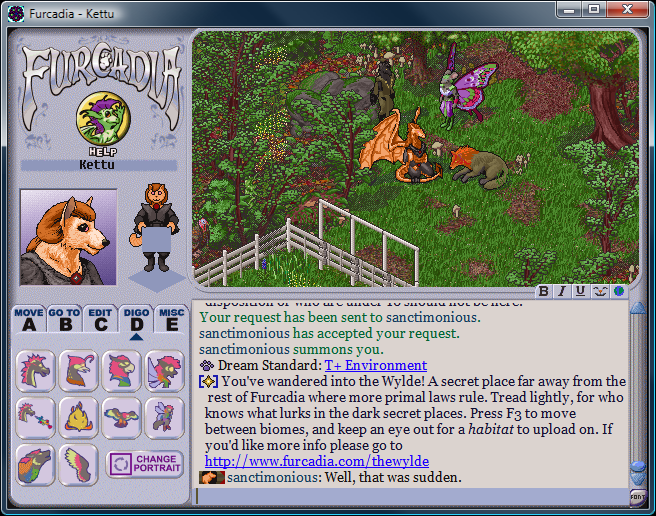
Game interface of Furcadia

The typical MUD will describe to the player the room or area they are standing in, listing the objects, players and non-player characters (NPCs) in the area, as well as all of the exits. To carry out a task the player would enter a text command such as take apple or attack dragon. Movement around the game environment is generally accomplished by entering the direction (or an abbreviation of it) in which the player wishes to move, for example typing north or just n would cause the player to exit the current area via the path to the north.

MUD clients are computer applications that make the MUD telnet interface more accessible to users, with features such as syntax highlighting, keyboard macros, and connection assistance. Prominent clients include TinyTalk, TinyFugue, TinTin++, and zMUD.

== Style ==
While there have been many variations in overall focus, gameplay and features in MUDs, some distinct sub-groups have formed that can be used to help categorize different game mechanics, game genres and non-game uses.

=== Hack and slash MUDs ===
Perhaps the most common approach to game design in MUDs is to loosely emulate the structure of a Dungeons & Dragons campaign focused more on fighting and advancement than role-playing. When these MUDs restrict player-killing in favor of player versus environment conflict and questing, they are labeled hack and slash MUDs. This may be considered particularly appropriate since, due to the room-based nature of traditional MUDs, ranged combat is typically difficult to implement, resulting in most MUDs equipping characters mainly with close-combat weapons. This style of game was also historically referred to within the MUD genre as "adventure games", but video gaming as a whole has developed a meaning of "adventure game" that is greatly at odds with this usage.

=== Player versus player MUDs ===
Most MUDs restrict player versus player combat, often abbreviated as PK (Player Killing). This is accomplished through hard coded restrictions and various forms of social intervention. MUDs without these restrictions are commonly known as PK MUDs. Taking this a step further are MUDs devoted solely to this sort of conflict, called pure PK MUDs, the first of which was Genocide in 1992. Genocide's ideas were influential in the evolution of player versus player online gaming.

=== Roleplaying MUDs ===
Roleplaying MUDs, generally abbreviated as RP MUDs, encourage or enforce that players act out the role of their playing characters at all times. Some RP MUDs provide an immersive gaming environment, while others only provide a virtual world with no game elements. MUDs where roleplay is enforced and the game world is heavily computer-modeled are sometimes known as roleplay intensive MUDs, or RPIMUDs. In many cases, role-playing MUDs attempt to differentiate themselves from hack and slash types, by dropping the "MUD" name entirely, and instead using MUX (Multi-User Experience) or MUSH (Multi-User Shared Hallucination).

=== Social MUDs ===
Social MUDs de-emphasize game elements in favor of an environment designed primarily for socializing. They are differentiated from talkers by retaining elements beyond online chat, typically online creation as a community activity and some element of role-playing. Often such MUDs have broadly defined contingents of socializers and roleplayers. Server software in the TinyMUD family, or MU*, is traditionally used to implement social MUDs.

=== Talkers ===
A less-known MUD variant is the talker, a variety of online chat environment typically based on server software like ew-too or NUTS. Most of the early Internet talkers were LPMuds with the majority of the complex game machinery stripped away, leaving just the communication commands. The first Internet talker was Cat Chat in 1990.

=== Educational MUDs ===
Taking advantage of the flexibility of MUD server software, some MUDs are designed for educational purposes rather than gaming or chat. MicroMUSE is considered by author Lauren P. Burka to have been the first educational MUD, but it can be argued that its evolution into this role was not complete until 1994, which would make the first of many educational MOOs, Diversity University in 1993, also the first educational MUD. The MUD medium lends itself naturally to constructionist learning pedagogical approaches. The Mud Institute (TMI) was an LPMud opened in February 1992 as a gathering place for people interested in developing LPMud and teaching LPC after it became clear that Lars Pensjö had lost interest in the project. TMI focussed on both the LPMud driver and library, the driver evolving into MudOS. The TMI Mudlib was never officially released, but was influential in the development of other libraries.

=== Graphical MUDs ===
A graphical MUD is a MUD that uses computer graphics to represent parts of the virtual world and its visitors. A prominent early graphical MUD was Habitat, written by Randy Farmer and Chip Morningstar for Lucasfilm in 1985. Some graphical MUDs require players to download a special client and the game's artwork, while others provide a rich experience by being website-based. Graphical MUDs range from simply enhancing the user interface (e.g. Wolfery provides an option to set the room picture, but otherwise remains a text-based interaction) to simulating 3D worlds with visual spatial relationships and customized avatar appearances (e.g. Ultima Online provides a rich point-and-click experience).

Games such as Meridian 59, EverQuest, Ultima Online and Dark Age of Camelot were routinely called graphical MUDs in their earlier years. RuneScape was actually originally intended to be a text-based MUD, but graphics were added very early in development. However, with the increase in computing power and Internet connectivity during the late 1990s, and the shift of online gaming to the mass market, the term "graphical MUD" fell out of favor, being replaced by MMORPG (massively multiplayer online role-playing game) a term coined by Richard Garriott in 1997.

== Development ==
Within a MUD's technical infrastructure, a mudlib (concatenation of "MUD library") defines the rules of the in-game world. Examples of mudlibs include Ain Soph Mudlib, CDlib, Discworld Mudlib, Lima Mudlib, LPUniversity Mudlib, MorgenGrauen Mudlib, Nightmare Mudlib, and TMI Mudlib.

== Community ==
MUD history has been preserved primarily through community sites and blogs and not through mainstream sources with journalistic repute. As of the late 1990s, a website called The Mud Connector has served as a central and curated repository for active MUDs. In 1995, The Independent reported that over 60,000 people regularly played about 600 MUDs, up from 170 MUDs three years prior. The Independent also noted distinct patterns of socialization within MUD communities.

In 2004, MUDs were relatively popular in the United States and mostly text-based.

Seraphina Brennan of Massively wrote that the MUD community was "in decline" as of 2009.

== Psychology and engagement ==
Sherry Turkle developed a theory that the constant use (and in many cases, overuse) of MUDs allows users to develop different personalities in their environments. She uses examples, dating back to the text-based MUDs of the mid-1990s, showing college students who simultaneously live different lives through characters in separate MUDs, up to three at a time, all while doing schoolwork. The students claimed that it was a way to "shut off" their own lives for a while and become part of another reality. Turkle claims that this could present a psychological problem of identity for today's youths.

"A Story About A Tree" is a short essay written by Raph Koster regarding the death of a LegendMUD player named Karyn, raising the subject of inter-human relationships in virtual worlds.

Observations of MUD-play show styles of play that can be roughly categorized. Achievers focus on concrete measurements of success such as experience points, levels, and wealth; Explorers investigate every nook and cranny of the game, and evaluate different game mechanical options; Socializers devote most of their energy to interacting with other players; and then there are Killers who focus on interacting negatively with other players, if permitted, killing the other characters or otherwise thwarting their play. Few players play only one way; most exhibit a diverse style. According to Richard Bartle, "People go there as part of a hero's journey—a means of self-discovery".

Research has suggested that various factors combine in MUDs to provide users with a sense of presence rather than simply communication.

== Grammatical usage and derived terms ==
As a noun, the word MUD is variously written MUD, Mud, and mud, depending on speaker and context. It is also used as a verb, with to mud meaning to play or interact with a MUD and mudding referring to the act of doing so. A mudder is one who MUDs. Compound words and portmanteaux such as mudlist, mudsex, and mudflation are also regularly coined. Puns on the "wet dirt" meaning of "mud" are endemic, as with, for example, the names of the ROM (Rivers of MUD), MUCK, MUSH, and CoffeeMUD codebases and the MUD Muddy Waters.

== See also ==
- Chronology of MUDs
- Bartle Test
- Online text-based role-playing game
- Integrated development environment
- Virtual economy
- Cyberformance
- Digital architecture

== Bibliography ==
- Bartle, Richard (2003). Designing Virtual Worlds. New Riders. ISBN 978-0-13-101816-7.
- Shah, Rawn; Romine, James (1995). Playing MUDs on the Internet. John Wiley & Sons, Inc. ISBN 978-0-471-11633-2.
- Busey, Andrew (1995). Secrets of the MUD Wizards. SAMS Publishing. ISBN 978-0-672-30723-2.
- Carton, Sean (1995). Internet Virtual Worlds Quick Tour. Ventana Press. ISBN 978-1-56604-222-2.
- Cheong, Fah-Chun (1996). Internet Agents: Spiders, Wanderers, Brokers, and Bots. New Riders. ISBN 1-56205-463-5.
- Burka, Lauren P. (1995). "The MUDline". The MUDdex.
- Koster, Raph (February 20, 2002). "Online World Timeline". Raph Koster's Website. Archived from the original on January 17, 2009.
- Reese, George (March 11, 1996). "The LPMud Timeline". Archived from the original on February 26, 2012.
- Mitchell, Don (March 23, 1995). "From MUDs To Virtual Worlds". Microsoft Social Computing Group. Archived from the original on September 26, 2006.
- Jøn, A. Asbjørn (2010). "The Development of MMORPG Culture and The Guild". Australian Folklore: A Yearly Journal of Folklore Studies. 25: 97–112. Archived from the original on December 30, 2022.
- McClellan, Jim (January 28, 1999). "Mind game in the MUD". The Guardian.
