= The Mud Connector =

Website dedicated to MUD video games

- Website type: Computer gaming website
- Owner: Andrew Cowan
- Creator: Andrew Cowan
- Website: http://www.mudconnect.com/
- Registration: Optional and free
- Launched: January 8, 1995

The Mud Connector, abbreviated TMC, is a computer gaming website that provides articles, discussions, reviews, resource links and game listings about MUDs. The site lets MUD owners, administrators and enthusiasts submit information and reviews about specific MUDs. The site contains over 1000 MUD listings and designates a subset of virtual communities suitable for children. Mud Companion magazine praised the site.

== History ==
The Mud Connector website was founded on January 8, 1995, by Andrew Cowan. It was hosted on the University of North Carolina at Greensboro mathematics department graduate assistants' Linux server. Shortly after the website was created, it was believed to be lost, due to a fatal hard disk crash and poor backup preparations, but within a few months the webpage was found in a Netscape cache file and restored. Initial MUD data was gathered via frequent requests made on Usenet newsgroups such as rec.games.mud.admin, inviting MUD administrators to submit their muds to the TMC database. Over time the Usenet postings were phased out and TMC outgrew the capabilities of its host, eventually moving to a dedicated server.
