= MUD terminology =

This is a glossary of terms common in multi-user dungeon (MUD) multiplayer virtual worlds.

== A–Z ==
bot
Character controlled by a computer program
consider
con
A command to assess an enemy's relative power
dino
A long-standing MUD player
equip
A player's active items
exits
Options for leaving an area
furry
Anthropomorphic animal
god
admin
arch
imp
implementer
The MUD's administrator or owner; see wizard for similar uses
guess-the-verb
Situation in which the player intends to perform an action but does not know the proper syntax to communicate it to the game
IC
Behavior "in-character" for the player's assumed role, as opposed to breaking character (OOC/"out-of-character")
haven
A designated place where players cannot be killed
hit points
Numeric representation of a character's life, i.e., when health is depleted, the character dies
immort

inv
The player's carried possessions, or inventory
log
A record of activity in the MUD instance
mana
Numeric representation of a character's magic energy
maving
To interact incorrectly, such as using incorrect commands
mob
mobile
An enemy monster
movement
Numeric representation of how far a character can move at once
mudflation
An online game virtual economy phenomenon in which endgame players become rich in currency and drive down the cost of rare items.
multi-boxing
dual-boxing
To play multiple characters simultaneously
newbie
A new or inexperienced player
OOC
To break character or act "out of character" from the player's assumed role
PK
player killer
To kill another player or be known as someone who has; also used as a verb (PKing or "player killing")
remort
To undo one's immortal status
rent
Virtual currency paid to preserve the player's inventory in-between play sessions in a persistent world
spamming
To post excessive text, scrolling the screen
stats
score
The player's numerical statistics, such as hit points and experience progression
tinysex
Cybersex through MUD commands or text
wiz
To be promoted to wizard status after completing the game
wizard
immort
immortals
Players with special rights, such as rights to create new MUD content; usually either MUD administrators, players who completed the game, or players appointed by an administrator to assist in its operation

== See also ==
- Glossary of video game terms

== Bibliography ==
- Hahn, Harley (1996). The Internet Complete Reference (2nd ed.). Osborne McGraw-Hill. ISBN 978-0-07-882138-7.
- Shah, Rawn; Romine, James (1995). Playing MUDs on the Internet. John Wiley & Sons. ISBN 978-0-471-11633-2.
- Towers, J. Tarin; Badertscher, Ken; Cunningham, Wayne; Buskirk, Laura (1996). Yahoo! Wild Web Rides. IDG Books. ISBN 978-0-7645-7003-2.
