= List of MUDs =

This is a chronological list of notable MUDs with summary information.

== Legend ==
Title	The MUD's title; if it has had more than one title, the most recent title. Disambiguation is included only when MUDs in this list have the same title.
Founded	The date the MUD was founded or first made publicly accessible.
Closed	The date the MUD ceased to be publicly accessible. A blank entry indicates the MUD continues to operate.
Business model	A brief description of the MUD's business model. "Free" means the MUD has no revenue stream. "Subscription" means that the MUD charges a periodic subscription fee for access or for a set level of in-game benefits, such as a "full" or "non-trial" account. "Pay for perks" means that the MUD accepts payments (which may be called "donations") and provides in-game benefits in exchange for them, on an à la carte basis. "Donation-supported" means that the MUD accepts payments, but its policies exclude providing in-game benefits in exchange for them. "Donation-drive supported" means that the MUD accepts payments, with policies excluding providing in-game benefits in exchange for them, only at specific times for specific purposes (most typically hardware upgrades), and does not accept payments at other times. "Freebie marketing" means that the MUD, by its existence, provides a purchase incentive for external goods.
Developer	The company that carried out development of the MUD, or if the MUD was not developed by a company, major individual contributors, if known by real name; "Et al." indicates other contributors, often a large number of participants in a project community.
Publisher	Any third parties that published the MUD. A blank entry indicates independent publication. "Independent" may also appear with a list of third parties to indicate that the MUD was independently published in addition to being published by third parties.
Setting	A summary of the genre of the MUD's setting or, if applicable, the specific setting it is based on.
Style	A summary of the style or styles of interaction the MUD focuses on.
Family	The general family of MUD server software that the MUD is associated with, if any.
Codebase	The specific server software the MUD is based on; a blank entry indicates independently developed, custom infrastructure. Multiple items indicate different codebases the MUD has used over time.
Mudlib	The mudlib the MUD is based on, if any.
Contributions	Publicly released software originating with the MUD or other public contributions.
Notes	Other brief and significant information: MUDs in this article that are versions of one another, category origination, key clarifications. Not for general information about the MUD.

== List ==
Title	Founded	Closed	Business model	Developer	Publisher	Setting	Style	Family	Codebase	Mudlib	Contributions	Notes
MUD1	1978		Free	Roy Trubshaw, Richard Bartle		Fantasy	Hack and slash	Essex	MUDDL		MUDDL	The first MUD; see also British Legends
MAD	1984	1986	Free	Bruno Chabrier, Vincent Lextrait	BITNET	Fantasy	Hack and slash					
Island of Kesmai	1985	2000	Subscription	Kesmai	CompuServe	Fantasy	Hack and slash, roguelike					See also Legends of Kesmai
MUD2	1985		Free	Richard Bartle, Roy Trubshaw, Simon Dally		Fantasy	Hack and slash	Essex	MUDDLE			Successor to/heavily updated version of MUD1
AberMUD	1987	1987	Free	Alan Cox, Richard Acott, Jim Finnis, Leon Thrane		Fantasy	Hack and slash	AberMUD	AberMUD		AberMUD	The first AberMUD
British Legends	1987	1999	Subscription	Roy Trubshaw, Richard Bartle	CompuServe	Fantasy	Hack and slash	Essex	MUDDL			Commercial version of MUD1
GemStone	1988		Subscription	Simutronics	GEnie, AOL, independent	High fantasy	Hack and slash					
Avalon	1989		Free	Yehuda Simmons		Fantasy	Politics, player versus player, roleplaying					Pioneered plotted quests.
TinyMUD	1989	1990	Free	James Aspnes		Cross-genre	Social	MU*	TinyMUD		TinyMUD	
Genesis LPMud	1989		Free	Lars Pensjö, Carl Hallén, Jakob Hallén, Lennart Augustsson, Johan Andersson, Anders Chrigström, Ronny Wikh, Stas van der Schaaf, Tony Elmroth, Dave Richards, Thornsten Lockert, Felix Croes et al.		Medieval fantasy	Roleplaying	LPMud	LPMud, CD	CD	LPMud, CD gamedriver and mudlib	The first LPMud
TinyTIM	1990		Free	Jason Scott Sadofsky et al.		Cross-genre	Social	MU*	TinyMUD, MUSH			
BatMUD	1990		Pay for perks	B.A.T. ry		Fantasy	Hack and slash, player versus player	LPMud	LPMud			
FurryMUCK	1990		Donation-supported			Furry	Social, roleplaying	MU*	TinyMUCK			
LambdaMOO	1990		Free	Pavel Curtis et al.	Xerox PARC, independent	Cross-genre	Social	MU*	MOO		LambdaCore	
MicroMUSE	1990		Free			Cross-genre	Educational, social	MU*	MUSH, TinyMUSE		TinyMUSE	Arguably first educational MUD
Lost Souls	1990		Pay for perks	Michael Rice, Rebecca Willey, Matthew Sheahan et al.		Medieval fantasy	Hack and slash, roleplaying	LPMud	LPMud 2.4.5, LPMud 3.1.2, Amylaar, LDMud	Ain Soph		
TubMUD	1990		Free			Medieval fantasy	Hack and slash, roleplaying	LPMud	LPMud 2.4.5, Amylaar, LDMud	Tublib		First MUD hosted in Germany
Ancient Anguish	1991		Donation-supported	Balz Meierhans, Olivier Maquelin et al.		Fantasy	Hack and slash	LPMud	Amylaar	Loch Ness		
Armageddon	1991		Donation-supported, freebie marketing	Dan Brumleve, Nasri Hajj, Santiago Zorzopulos, Cat Rambo et al.		Post-apocalyptic low fantasy	Roleplaying	DikuMUD	DikuMUD			
DikuMUD	1991	1991	Free	Sebastian Hammer, Michael Seifert, Hans Henrik Staerfeldt, Tom Madsen, Katja Nyboe		Fantasy	Hack and slash	DikuMUD	DikuMUD		DikuMUD	Refers to the first DikuMUD at freja.diku.dk 4000
Discworld MUD	1991		Free	David Bennett, Craig Richmond, Sean A. Reith, Evan Scott, Derek Harding, Jake Greenland et al.		Discworld	Hack and slash, roleplaying, social	LPMud	LPMud, MudOS, FluffOS	Discworld	Discworld mudlib, FluffOS	
Dragon's Gate	1991	2006	Subscription	Darrin Hyrup	GEnie, AOL, Mythic Realms, independent	Fantasy	Hack and slash, roleplaying					
Elendor	1991		Free			Lord of the Rings	Roleplaying, social	MU*	MUSH			
PernMUSH	1991	2014	Free			Pern	Roleplaying, social	MU*	MUSH			
Star Wars MUSH	1991		Free			Star Wars	Roleplaying, social	MU*	MUSH			
Xyllomer	1991		Free			Fantasy	Roleplaying	LPMud	LPMud, DGD	CD		First public DGD MUD
Genocide	1992		Free			Fantasy	Player versus player	LPMud	LPMud, MudOS, Amylaar			First "pure PK" MUD
AmberMUSH	1992	2009	Free	Jennifer Smith et al.		Amber	Roleplaying	MU*	TinyMUSH			
Infinity (LPMud)	1992		Free	Peter William Friedman, Bill Mackiewicz et al.		Cross-genre	Hack and slash, social, player versus player	LPMud	LPMud 3.1.2, LDMud	LPMud 2.4.5		
3Kingdoms	1992		Pay for perks			Cross-genre	Hack and slash	LPMud	LDMud			
The Shadow of Yserbius	1992	1996	Subscription	Sierra On-Line	The Sierra Network, The ImagiNation Network, AOL	Fantasy	Hack and slash, graphical					
MorgenGrauen	1992		Free			Medieval fantasy	Hack and slash	LPMud	LDMud	MorgenGrauen	MorgenGrauen Mudlib	
Diversity University	1993	2006	Free	Jeanne McWhorter et al.		Modern	Educational	MU*	MOO			First educational MOO, arguably first educational MUD
BioMOO	1993	2001	Free	Gustavo Glusman, Jaime Prilusky et al.		Modern	Educational	MU*	MOO		File Utilities Package, intermoo GNA Network	
Infinity (AberMUD)	1993		Free			Fantasy	Hack and slash	AberMUD	AberMUD			
BayMOO	1993		Free	Tim Keanini et al.		Modern	Social, educational	MU*	MOO			
MediaMOO	1993	2000	Free	Amy S. Bruckman et al.		Modern	Educational	MU*	MOO			Mirror archived at Clemson University
DragonSpires	1994	1997	Pay for perks	Dragon's Eye Productions		Fantasy	Social, roleplaying, graphical					
LegendMUD	1994		Free	Raph Koster, Kristen Koster, Rick Delashmit, Sherry Delashmit et al.		Historical fantasy	Hack and slash	DikuMUD	DikuMUD			
Legends of Terris	1994		Subscription	Paul Barnett, Doug Goldner, Online Games Company		Fantasy	Hack and slash, roleplaying		Horizon Engine			
Realms of Despair	1994		Free	Derek Snider et al.		Fantasy	Hack and slash	DikuMUD	Merc 2, SMAUG		SMAUG	
AVATAR MUD	1995		Free	Kevin Jagh et al.		Fantasy	Hack and slash	DikuMUD	Merc 2			
LinguaMOO	1995		Free	Cynthia Haynes, Jan Rune Holmevik et al.		Modern	Educational	MU*	MOO			
ATHEMOO	1995	2010	Free	Juli Burk et al.		Modern	Educational, theatrical	MU*	MOO			
The Ruins of Cawdor	1995	1996	Subscription	Sierra On-Line	The Sierra Network, The ImagiNation Network, AOL	Fantasy	Hack and slash, graphical					
DragonRealms	1996		Subscription	Simutronics	GEnie, AOL, CompuServe, Prodigy, Microsoft Gaming Zone, independent	Fantasy	Hack and slash, roleplaying, player versus player					
MOOSE Crossing	1996	2007	Free	Amy S. Bruckman et al.		Modern	Educational	MU*	MOO			
Legends of Kesmai	1996	2000	Subscription	Kesmai	independent, AOL, GameStorm, EA	Fantasy	Hack and slash, graphical, roguelike					Tile-graphics version of Island of Kesmai
TorilMUD	1996		Free	Kris Kortright et al.		Forgotten Realms	Hack and slash	DikuMUD	Sequent			
Achaea, Dreams of Divine Lands	1997		Pay for perks, subscription	Iron Realms Entertainment		Fantasy	Roleplaying, Player versus player		Rapture		ATCP	
Alter Aeon	1997		Pay for perks	Dennis Towne et al.		Medieval fantasy	Hack and slash	DikuMUD	DentinMUD			
ifMUD	1997		Free	Liza Daly et al.		Interactive fiction	Social	MU*	PerlMUD		Hosts the XYZZY Awards	
Darkness Falls: The Crusade	1999	2006	Subscription	Mythic Entertainment	GameStorm, AOL, Centropolis Entertainment	Fantasy	Player versus player					
RuneScape	2001		Subscription, pay for perks	Jagex		Fantasy	Hack and slash, graphical					
Wyvern	2001	2013	Free	Cabochon Inc.		Fantasy	Hack and slash, graphical, roguelike					
God Wars II	2002		Free	Richard Woolcock et al.		Dark fantasy	Player versus player		Gladiator Pits II		Gladiator Pits II, MSDP	
HellMOO	2003	2022	Free			Post-apocalyptic	player versus player	MU*	MOO			
