= Earth Eternal =

- Developer: Outblaze
- Publishers: Outblaze, Sankando Corporation
- Engine: OGRE
- Platforms: Windows XP, Windows Vista, or Windows 7. Mac OS is in development
- Release: Open beta: Oct 7, 2009
- Genre: MMORPG
- Mode: MMOG

Earth Eternal was a free-to-play browser-based fantasy MMORPG, developed by American studio Outblaze (formerly Turnout Ventures) and published by SparkPlay Media. First announced on January 10, 2007, it was released for Open Beta on Oct. 7, 2009.

On August 8, 2010, SparkPlay Media announced it was likely going into bankruptcy and that it was actively holding an auction for Earth Eternal. The credit system was shut down and many of its items were made freely available. SparkPlay Media's CEO stated that unless a buyer was forthcoming, Earth Eternal would end when its webhost shut down the server for non-payment. However, on August 18, 2010, Earth Eternal was bought off in an auction. On August 31, 2010, Earth Eternal and the website would shut down in North America, with the game being acquired by Japanese online game company Sankando Corporation.

On July 21, 2011, the Earth Eternal website was reopened in Japan and the game was scheduled to be released in North America in Summer 2011.

Since November 24, 2011 at 9 PM EST, the game was cancelled indefinitely.

After all official servers closed, private servers such as "Terra Aeterna" were created, allowing the game to still be played.

== Setting ==
The game takes place in the future, after modern human civilization has fallen and been replaced with a civilization of anthropomorphic animal races. In the game's world, humanity was preceded on Earth by a series of magical civilizations. This background information is referred to as "Lore" on the game's website, which provides both a summary of the fictional history and a comprehensive, 145-page pdf version. In this story, the history of Earth is divided into four periods: the Lost Ages, the Age of Legend, the Age of Man, and the Age of Beasts.

During the Lost Ages, Earth was ruled by the Titan Kronos and his wife Helga. Their subjects included many races, but primarily the Faerie, who eventually rebelled. The Faerie leader, Agalarna, was exiled into space on a comet. During the subsequent millennia, a malevolent being called Djall, also known as the Dark Lord, attached itself to Agalarna. When the comet returned to Earth, Djall came to the planet and tricked the Titans into entering a portal to the plane of Tartarus in pursuit of greater power. He then sealed the portal, trapping them and leaving him locked in a struggle with Gaia, the lone Titan to not fall for his ruse. Over a period of aeons, the Godwars were fought. Gaia released the Gods, children of the Titans who had been in hibernation, to fight against Djall. Life on Earth was nearly destroyed and the Faerie hid themselves away in a refuge called Otherworld. Gaia, the Gods, and Djall reached an accord to wage their conflict only through intermediaries, ending the Lost Ages.

During the subsequent Age of Legend, Djall created Salamanzar to lead his Undead hordes while Gaia greeted the Beasts, a large number of races that resembled various animals. Among the evil races they fought were the Dvergar. Eight Beasts became particularly powerful mages and were called the Mystarchs. The Mystarchs discovered an evil force called the Shadow Legion and attempted to unite Beasts in opposition to it. However, the rule of the Mystarchs became oppressive and the Beasts rebelled, executing or exiling the Mystarchs and instead uniting under the leadership of the judge Solomon. The following twenty-three generations constituted a golden era during which all Beast races lived in peace and culture flourished under the rule of Solomon's descendants. However, the peace was shattered by the invasion of the Primals, who stormed Europe from over the Western Sea. They were repelled only through the intervention of the Faerie, who subsequently returned to Otherworld. Vinga, the first Vampire, then rebelled against Salamanzar and established the Blood Kingdom in Eastern Europe. Salamanzar was killed in the course of his campaign to retake Vinga's domain, and Vinga became the ruler of Europe. During the two-thousand-year "Bleakness," only a stronghold in the Great Forest in Western Europe remained free of Undead rule. A hero, Atan, then arose. Of an unknown Beast race, Atan learned magical arts in the Far East and returned to Europe with his followers, freeing Europe from Vinga. However, the People of the Skull and the Dvergar remained as threats.

The Age of Legend ended when one Beast was slain by other Beasts, ending their covenant. The murderers became Mankind, beginning the Age of Man. Gaia, seeing that Man would come to dominate Earth, hid the Beasts outside of reality in areas called Groves. Millennia later, Mankind declared war upon itself. Over the course of a few decades, Man's cities were destroyed and the environment was badly damaged. The Gods persuaded the ancient race of the Maar to cleanse the atmosphere, but in the process the Maar became the monstrous Goliaths. In a process called the Reclamation, the Beasts returned to Earth, starting the Age of Beasts. The game takes place in Europe, about two millennia into the Age of Beasts.

== Development and Closing ==
Development on Earth Eternal began 2006, but would not be announced until January 10, 2007. CEO and Founder of Iron Realms Entertainment (IRE) Matt Mihaly, announced the founding of a sister company of IRE, called Sparkplay Media, with the intention of creating a free MMORPG with the ability to be played through a web browser. Additionally, Earth Eternal’s system would be entirely microtransaction based, which had just begun to be accepted in the West. Mihaly would leave as CEO of IRE to become CEO of Sparkplay Media. Earth Eternal was initially scheduled for release in the summer of 2007, however, as a result of a substantial increase in funding [over $4 million from Redpoint Ventures and Prism Ventureworks] its release was changed to sometime in 2009.

Questing party at night in Bremen town

As of April 2009, approximately 40 chapters of the history had been released, along with 22 male and female anthropomorphic races. In addition, the classes were tentatively released.

On February 2, 2009, Sparkplay Media released a new website. The new website contained improved features and more information than the older website, as well as new videos and information.

On May 18, 2009, Earth Eternal announced the beginning of its closed Beta phase. A newsletter was sent out, inviting the recipients to take a brief survey and thereby put themselves in the pre-selection pool of beta testers.

On July 14, 2009, Sparkplay Media released a Fansite Kit to the public. The fansite kit included Logos, Avatars, Images of the Playable Races, Concept Art, Screen Shots, a Fact Sheet, FAQ, and a Getting Started Guide.

On Oct. 7, 2009, Earth Eternal went into open beta.

On August 8, 2010, Matt Mihaly, CEO of Sparkplay Media, announced that the company was out of funds and all but himself and another unnamed employee had been laid off and that the future of the game was uncertain. Mihaly had been trying to sell Sparkplay Media for the two months prior to the announcement; however, he could find no buyers. Sparkplay Media was put up for auction on August 8, and was purchased on the 17th by TurnOut Ventures.

Earth Eternal remained online after the purchase by TurnOut until August 31, 2010, where it was shut down due to non-payment to their internet service provider.

When TurnOut Ventures purchased Earth Eternal they inherited Sparkplay Media's contractual obligations to the Japanese publisher, Sankando, to create a localized version of Earth Eternal for the Japanese market. This Japanese version of Earth Eternal, called Ikimonogatari, was announced on April 11, 2011 and was officially launched on July 5, 2011.

By July 2011, American players could once again log into Earth Eternal, now called Earth Eternal Reborn (EER), headed by the developer TurnOut Ventures. This was a limited beta test of the new game client and servers, though some major changes to the game took place. To log in, users had to utilize their Facebook accounts, through which provided the only access to log into Earth Eternal. Additionally, all user characters and data had been deleted before the re-launch of Earth Eternal, much to the dismay of many former players who had spent money on micro transactions for their previous characters. Furthermore, Japanese models were used for the playable characters, appearing quite different from their previously released counterparts. Open Beta for EER was officially started on August 9, 2011.

On October 31, 2011, the Japanese Earth Eternal (Ikimonogatari) website was taken down, and it was announced on the (North American) Earth Eternal Reborn forms that development had been put on indefinite hold and EER's development team at TurnOut had been relocated to other projects. Earth Eternal Reborn remained online, though the cash shop had been closed.

On November 20, 2011, the English Earth Eternal Facebook page stated that as of November 24, 2011 at 9pm EST the game would be closing, without a known date if or when the game would be playable again.

== Gameplay ==
Earth Eternal is a free massively multiplayer online role-playing game. It is comparable to RuneScape and Achaea as it shares many gameplay elements with these games.

The game is free to play, with the option of players to purchase in-game content with real money; though everything that can be bought with real money can also be gotten for free by playing longer, essentially making payment a faster way to level up, obtain items and advance in the game.

The 22 Player races, while they look drastically different, will not have any racial differences among them. This means that a Clockwork, Foxen, and Fangren will all start with the same stats, and none will have an advantage in any area when they begin the game. The reason for this was because the game developers wanted a player to be able to choose any race they wanted, without any handicap or penalty for specializing in a particular class.

Player versus player combat system is included in the game. It consists of several arenas scattered throughout the major cities. Players can enter the arena at any time and battle other participants currently inside. There is no penalty for dying in the arena. Additionally, most of the game does not have loading zones, but rather be contiguous for most of the map, except in some far-flung areas of the map and underground areas. The game will have a 'soft level cap', so a player can theoretically gain infinite levels, though as the player progresses, it will take more experience points before they level up, such that eventually it may take years to gain another level. Lastly, there will be no 'death penalty' in terms of gold, items, or experience. When a player dies, depending on the option they choose, they can lose coins, or take temporary health and stat loss. They also lose "Heroism", which is a bar that affects luck, item drops, extra HP, and which is filled through killing monsters.

=== Classes ===
Earth Eternal features four playable classes: Druid, Knight, Mage, and Rogue. The player can choose one of the four classes as a primary class. The player will not be restricted to their chosen class however; a Knight could specialize in melee combat, or they could learn some Mage, Rogue, or Druid skills if they want to. Though, they will not be able to learn all the skills that a player who started in those classes can learn. The Developers have also stated some changes will be made to classes in future.

=== Groves ===
Groves are instanced areas accessible only by the owning player or clan. Owners can invite friends into their groves. Each player will be able to choose from a number of different styles of Groves, and will be able to modify the terrain, making mountains, valleys, lakes, etc. as they wish. Each player will be provided a basic Grove free of charge. Additions or amenities such as furniture to the Groves will likely cost credits.

=== Clans ===
Players will have the ability to both join and form clans, though creating them will cost 10 gold. Any player may create a clan if they wish, and there are NPC's for creating a clan in Camelot, Bremen, and Heartwood. Each clan gets its own chat channel, and ranks are available for the clan leader to decide on (Officer, Member, Initiate). Additionally, each clan will have its own Grove, though it is unclear if the Grove will be free, or if the new clan must pay for it. Clans can only be created by players, no preexisting clans will be established.
