= Free-to-play =

Video game industry business model

Free-to-play (F2P or FtP) video games are games that give players access to a significant portion of their content for free. The term "free-to-play business model" or simply, "free-to-play model", refers collectively to business models that ultimately result in the creation of free-to-play games. Games that adhere to free-to-play business models are distinct from traditional premium games, which require payment before use. Free-to-play games are not to be confused with freeware games, which are entirely costless. Accordingly, free-to-play games are sometimes called "free-to-start" due to not being entirely free. Certain free-to-play games have also been labeled as "pay-to-win"—that is, that players can pay to obtain competitive advantages over other players.

There are several kinds of ways that free-to-play games generate money, despite being mostly free. A common method is based on the freemium software model, in which users are incentivised to make small purchases, called microtransactions, to either access additional cosmetic or gameplay content, progress through the content faster, or gain competitive advantages over other players. Another method of generating revenue is to integrate advertisements into the game.

The free-to-play business model was commonly seen in early massively multiplayer online games targeted towards casual gamers, before finding wider adoption among games released by major video game publishers to combat video game piracy. The model has been used by games such as Star Wars: The Old Republic, Apex Legends, Fortnite, VALORANT, League of Legends, and Roblox.

== Revenue sources ==
=== In-game items ===
In-game items may be purely cosmetic, or they may influence gameplay in a variety of ways, such as enhancing a character's power level or accelerating progression speed. A common technique used by developers of these games is for the items purchased to have a time limit; after this expires, the item must be repurchased before the user can continue. Another commonly seen mechanic is the use of two in-game currencies: one earned through normal gameplay, and another which can be purchased with real-world money. The second, "premium" currency is sometimes given out in small amounts to non-paying players at certain times, such as when they first start the game, complete a quest, or refer a friend to the game. Many browser games have an "energy bar" that depletes when the player takes actions. These games then sell items such as coffee or snacks to refill the bar. Free-to-play games commonly use microtransactions, which allow players to purchase in-game items or advantages using real money. These purchases may include cosmetic items such as character skins and customization options, gameplay enhancements, timsaving e-features, or access to additional content. This system allows access to the core gameplay without payment while offering optional purchases that enhance convenience or accelerate progression. Other free-to-play games also include loot boxes, in which players can purchase random virtual items using real money or in-game currency. These mechanics have attracted significant research attention due to their similarities to gambling, as players spend money without knowing the outcome of the rewards. Research has examined the association between loot box spending and problem gambling behavior. Battle passes are also used in some free-to-play games. They are a seasonal monetization system in which players earn rewards by completing in-game challenges. Players may access a free reward track, while a premium track is available for purchase to obtain additional rewards, such as cosmetic items, in-game currency, and other content. Some free-to-play games use virtual currencies that can be purchased with real money and used to buy items within the game. The use of virtual currency can create psychological distance from real-world spending, which may encourage additional purchases. Research on freemium games suggests that factors such as convenience, progression speed, social interaction, and personalization can influence players’ decisions to make purchases.

=== Advertisements ===
Some free-to-play games, such as id Software's Quake Live, use in-game advertising to generate revenue. In addition to making in-game items available for purchase, EA integrates in-game advertising into its games. In August 2007, EA completed a deal with Massive Incorporated, which lets Massive update and change in-game advertising in real-time within EA games.

== History ==
Matt Mihaly created the first known business model of exchanging virtual items for money in an online game, in 1997 for the flagship title Achaea, Dreams of Divine Lands for his corporation originally Achaea LLC that later became Iron Realms Entertainment. The free-to-play business model in online games was later realized by Nexon in South Korea to a degree first catching more major media attention at the time. The first Nexon game to use it, QuizQuiz, was released in October 1999. Its head developer, Lee Seungchan, would eventually be involved in the creation of MapleStory.

The free-to-play model originated in the late 1990s and early 2000s, coming from a series of highly successful MMOs targeted towards children and casual gamers, including Furcadia, Neopets, RuneScape, MapleStory, and text-based dungeons such as Achaea, Dreams of Divine Lands. Known for producing innovative titles, small independent developers also continue to release free-to-play games.

Free-to-play games are particularly prevalent in countries such as South Korea and the People's Republic of China. Microtransaction-based free-to-play mobile games and browser games such as Puzzle & Dragons, Kantai Collection and The Idolmaster Cinderella Girls also have large player populations in Japan. In particular, the Nikkei Shimbun reported in September 2012 that Cinderella Girls was earning over 1 billion yen in revenue monthly from microtransactions. Electronic Arts first adopted the free-to-play concept in one of its games when it released FIFA Online in Korea.

In the late 2000s, many MMOs transitioned to the free-to-play model from subscriptions, including subscription-based games such as The Lord of the Rings Online: Shadows of Angmar, Age of Conan: Hyborian Adventures, Dungeons & Dragons Online, and Champions Online. Turbine as of September 10, 2010, has given an F2P with Cash shop option to The Lord of the Rings Online which resulted in a tripling of profit. Sony Online Entertainment's move to transition EverQuest from a subscription model into a hybrid F2P/subscription game was followed by a 125% spike in item sales, a 150% up-tick in unique log-ins, and over three times as many account registrations.

The movement of free-to-play MMOs into the mainstream also coincided with experimentation with other genres as well. The model was picked up by larger developers and more diverse genres, with games such as Battlefield Heroes, Free Realms, Quake Live and Team Fortress 2 appearing in the late 2000s. The experimentation was not successful in every genre, however. Traditional real time strategy franchises such as Age of Empires and Command & Conquer both attempted free-to-play titles. Age of Empires Online was shut down in the midst of a tiny player base and stagnant revenue, and Command & Conquer: Generals 2 was shut down in alpha due to negative reactions from players.

In 2011, revenue from free-to-play games overtook revenue from premium games in the top 100 games in Apple's App Store. The percentage of people that spend money on in-game items in these games ranges from 0.5% to 6%, depending on a game's quality and mechanics. Even though this means that a large number of people will never spend money in a game, it also means that the people that do spend money could amount to a sizeable number due to the fact that the game was given away for free. Indeed a report from mobile advertising company firm SWRV stated that only 1.5 percent of players opted to pay for in-game items, and that 50 percent of the revenue for such games often came from just ten percent of players. Nevertheless The Washington Post noted that the developers of two such games, Supercell (Clash of Clans) and Machine Zone (Game of War: Fire Age), were able to afford Super Bowl commercials in 2015 featuring big-name celebrities (respectively Liam Neeson and Kate Upton). The latter, Game of War, was in fact, part of a roughly $40 million campaign starring Upton.

Many video game publishers use the free-to-play model for the MOBA genre.

During 2015, Slice Intelligence tracked people that bought products in mobile video games, and these players spent an average of $87 in free-to-play games. The highest spending per player in 2015 was in Game of War: Fire Age, where the players that bought products on average spent $550.

In the 2020s, free-to-play models were dominated by gacha mechanics. Games such as Genshin Impact, Blox Fruits and Cookie Run: Kingdom saw leaps in popularity in part due to the rise in cozy games as well as the COVID-19 pandemic. As these games are often both free-to-play and cross-platform, they do not require specialist hardware and are accessible to players even on low-end devices.

Other free-to-play games, such as Fortnite, saw a huge increase in active players during the early 2020s. Some critics suggest that its bright colors help its appeal, while others point out that, like competitors such as Roblox, it holds a variety of game styles and one-off events that retain players. The game is continually updated with new content and has collaborations with Hatsune Miku and South Park. Despite this, daily player counts on Fortnite have been dropping since 2023.

== Comparison with traditional model ==
The free-to-play model has been described as a shift from the traditional model of buy-to-play game, where the game's success is measured through statistics such as player count or units sold. Within free-to-play, the most important factor is the number of players that a game can keep continuously engaged, followed by how many compelling spending opportunities the game offers its players. With free games that include in-game purchases, two particularly important things occur: first, more people will try out the game since there is zero cost to doing so and second, revenue will likely be more than a traditional game since different players can now spend different amounts of money that depend on their engagement with the game and their preferences towards it. Player populations that spend money on free-to-play games can be broken up into terms that borrow from gambling: "whales" which typically are the smallest segment, up to around 10% of players, but are willing to spend the most on a game; "dolphins" which represent a larger portion of around 40% of players who spend some money but not as much as whales; and "minnows", representing about half the population, who spend the barest amount to maintain activity. As a result of this distribution, whales typically provide most of the revenue in free to play games, and in some cases, 50% of the revenue comes from 0.15% of players ("white whales") in one report. It is not unlikely for a very few players to spend tens of thousands of dollars in a game that they enjoy.

For PC gaming specifically, two challenges exist: video game piracy and demanding system requirements. The free-to-play model attempts to solve both these problems by providing a game that requires relatively low system requirements and at no cost, and consequently provides a highly accessible experience funded by advertising and micropayments for extra content or an advantage over other players.

Free-to-play is newer than the pay-to-play model, and the video game industry is still attempting to determine the best ways to maximize revenue from their games. Gamers have cited the fact that purchasing a game for a fixed price is still inherently satisfying because the consumer knows exactly what they will be receiving, compared to free-to-play which requires that the player pay for most new content that they wish to obtain. The term itself, "free-to-play", has been described as one with a negative connotation. One video game developer noted this, stating, "Our hope—and the basket we're putting our eggs in—is that 'free' will soon be disassociated with [sic] 'shallow' and 'cruddy'." However, another noted that developing freeware games gave developers the largest amount of creative freedom, especially when compared to developing console games, which requires that the game follow the criteria as laid out by the game's publisher. Many kinds of revenue are being experimented with. For example, with its Free Realms game targeted to children and casual gamers, Sony makes money from the product with advertisements on loading screens, free virtual goods sponsored by companies such as Best Buy, a subscription option to unlock extra content, a collectible card game, a comic book, and micropayment items that include character customization options.

In 2020, a study from Germany concluded that some free-to-play games use the "money illusion" as a form to hide the true cost of products. When they examined the game Fortnite, they found that since the in-game currency does not have a unique exchange rate, it can conceal the true cost of an in-game purchase, resulting in players potentially paying more than they realize. In 2021 the study was used to take legal action against Epic Games, the publisher of Fortnite.

=== Pay-to-win ===
In some games, players who are willing to pay for special items, downloadable content, or to skip cooldown timers may be able to gain an advantage over those playing for free who might otherwise hardly be able to access said items. Such games are called "pay-to-win" (abbreviated as "P2W"). In general a game is considered pay-to-win when a player can gain any advantage over their non-paying peers. Market research indicates that pay-to-win mechanics are considered much more acceptable by players in China than in Western countries, possibly because Chinese players are more habituated to recurring costs associated with gaming, such as gaming café fees.

A common suggestion for avoiding pay-to-win is for payments to only be used to broaden the experience without affecting gameplay. For example, some games, such as Dota 2, Fortnite Battle Royale, and StarCraft II, only allow the purchase of cosmetic items, meaning that a player who has spent money on the game will still be on the same level as a player who has not. Others suggest finding a balance where a game encourages players to pay for extra content that enhances the game without making the free version feel limited by comparison. This theory is that players who do not pay for items would still increase awareness of it through word of mouth marketing, which ultimately benefits the game indirectly.

In response to concerns about players using payments to gain an advantage in the game, titles such as World of Tanks have explicitly committed to not giving paying players any advantages over their non-paying peers, while allowing the users buying the "gold" or "premium" ammo and expendables without paying the real money. However, features affecting gameplay and win rate, such as purchasing a 100% crew training level, a premium account, premium vehicles, and converting experience points to free experience points, remain available for the paying customers only.

=== Play-to-earn ===
Play-to-earn, also known as pay-to-earn, is a model of monetization that uses cryptocurrency and other blockchain technologies.

=== Nagging ===
In single-player games, another concern is the tendency for free games to constantly request that the player buy extra content, in a similar vein to nagware and trialware's frequent demands for the user to "upgrade". Payment may be required in order to survive or continue in the game, annoying or distracting the player from the experience. Some psychologists, such as Mark D. Griffiths, have criticized the mechanics of freemium games as exploitative, drawing direct parallels to gambling addiction.

=== Purchases by children ===
The ubiquitous and often intrusive use of microtransactions in free-to-play games has sometimes caused children to either inadvertently or deliberately pay for large amounts of virtual items, often for drastically high amounts of real money. In February 2013, Eurogamer reported that Apple had agreed to refund a British family £1700.41 after their son had purchased countless microtransactions whilst playing the F2P game Zombies vs. Ninjas.

== Effects on player behavior ==
Free-to-play (F2P) games have been widely studied for their influence on player engagement patterns, spending behavior, and long-term interaction with digital systems. Unlike traditional premium games that rely primarily on a single upfront purchase, F2P titles are structured around continued participation and optional in-game purchases. As a result, design elements within these games are often developed to encourage sustained play over extended periods of time.

Research in game psychology has identified structural characteristics such as reward frequency, progression pacing, and reinforcement schedules as factors that can influence repeated engagement. Many F2P games employ variable-ratio reward systems, in which rewards are delivered unpredictably rather than on a fixed schedule. Behavioral research suggests that variable reinforcement structures can produce higher rates of repeated interaction compared to predictable reward patterns. In gaming environments, these systems may appear in the form of randomized item drops, loot systems, or chance-based rewards tied to gameplay milestones.

F2P titles frequently incorporate retention mechanics designed to promote habitual participation. Common examples include daily login bonuses, streak rewards, limited-time challenges, and energy systems that restrict the number of actions a player can perform within a given timeframe. These mechanics often create cycles of return behavior, encouraging players to re-enter the game regularly in order to avoid losing progress or missing temporary rewards. Scholars have argued that such structures align with established behavioral reinforcement principles, though their implementation varies widely across genres and platforms.

Spending behavior within F2P environments has also been examined in academic literature. Research indicates that purchases of virtual goods are influenced not only by functional advantages but also by psychological and social factors. Cosmetic customization options—such as character skins, avatars, emotes, and decorative items—allow players to express identity and differentiate themselves within online communities. Studies suggest that motivations for virtual purchases may include self-presentation, enjoyment, social recognition, and perceived value within peer groups.

Social design features in F2P games may further shape engagement patterns. Multiplayer systems such as guilds, cooperative missions, and competitive leaderboards can introduce elements of social obligation and peer comparison. Participation in group-based objectives may encourage players to return consistently in order to maintain status or fulfill cooperative responsibilities. In competitive environments, ranking systems and visible performance metrics can increase time investment by introducing comparison-based incentives.

The data-driven nature of many F2P platforms has also contributed to refined engagement strategies. Developers commonly analyze metrics such as retention rates, session length, churn rates, and conversion percentages to adjust game economies and reward systems. This analytical approach enables iterative design changes intended to reduce player drop-off and optimize long-term participation. As a result, game updates, seasonal content releases, and progression adjustments may be informed by aggregated behavioral data.

At the same time, concerns have been raised regarding the ethical implications of certain monetization and reward systems within F2P models. Randomized purchase mechanics, particularly loot boxes, have been the subject of empirical investigation and regulatory debate. Studies have reported associations between loot box spending and measures of problem gambling severity, prompting discussions in several jurisdictions about consumer protection and transparency requirements. While not all F2P games include randomized monetization features, the broader debate has contributed to increased scrutiny of behavioral design strategies within digital games.

Overall, the free-to-play model has reshaped how player engagement is structured, measured, and sustained. By combining accessibility with retention-oriented systems and optional monetization, F2P games operate within an ecosystem that integrates design, psychology, and data analytics. Ongoing research continues to examine the long-term behavioral and economic effects of these systems across different player demographics and platforms.

== Outlook ==
Pointing to the disruptive effect of free-to-play on current models, IGN editor Charles Onyett stated in 2011 that "expensive, one-time purchases are facing extinction". He believes that the current method of paying a one-time fee for most games will eventually disappear completely. Greg Zeschuk of BioWare believes there is a good possibility that free-to-play would become the dominant pricing plan for games, but that it was very unlikely that it would ever completely replace subscription-based games. Developers such as Electronic Arts have pointed to the success of freemium, saying that microtransactions will inevitably be part of every game. While noting the success of some developers with the model, companies such as Nintendo have remained skeptical of free-to-play, preferring to stick to more traditional models of game development and sales. In February 2015 Apple began featuring popular non-freemium software on the App Store as "Pay Once & Play", describing them as "Great Games with No In-App Purchases ... hours of uninterrupted fun with complete experiences".

== See also ==
- List of commercial video games released as freeware
- List of PlayStation 4 free-to-play games
- Gacha game
- Loot box
- Open-source video game
