= Online text-based role-playing game =

Role-playing game type

An online text-based role playing game is a role-playing game played online using a solely text-based interface. Online text-based role playing games date to 1978, with the creation of MUD1, which began the MUD heritage that culminates in today's MMORPGs. Some online-text based role playing games are video games, but some are organized and played entirely by humans through text-based communication. Over the years, games have used TELNET, internet forums, IRC, email and social networking websites as their media.

There are varied genres of online text-based roleplaying, including fantasy, drama, horror, anime, science fiction, and media-based fan role-play. Role-playing games based on popular media (for example, the Harry Potter series) are common, and the players involved tend to overlap with the relevant fandom.

== Varieties ==
=== MUDs ===
Precursor to the now more popular MMORPGs of today are the branch of text-based games known as MUD, MOO, MUCK, MUSH et al., a broad family of server software tracing their origins back to MUD1 and being used to implement a variety of games and other services. Many of these platforms implement Turing-complete programming languages and can be used for any purpose, but various types of server have historical and traditional associations with particular uses: "mainstream" MUD servers like LPMud and DikuMUD are typically used to implement combat-focused games, while the TinyMUD family of servers, sometimes referred to by the term MU*, are more usually used to create "social MUDs" devoted to role-playing and socializing, or non-game services such as educational MUDs. While these are often seen as definitive boundaries, exceptions abound; many MUSHes have a software-supported combat system, while a "Role-Playing Intensive MUD" movement occurred primarily in the DikuMUD world, and both the first Internet talker (a type of purely social server) and the very popular talker software ew-too were based on LPMud code. Although interest in these games has suffered from the popularity of MMORPGs, a large number of them still operate.

=== Play-by-post and PBEM ===
Play-by-post role-playing games or PBP RPGs refer to another type of text-based gaming. Rather than following gameplay in real-time, such as in MUDs, players post messages on such media as bulletin boards, online forums, Chatrooms (such as like AOL, hangouts and Yahoo chat) and mailing lists to which their fellow players will post role-played responses without a real limit or timeframe. Of late such blogging tools and sites as LiveJournal have been utilized for this purpose. This includes such games as play-by-email (or PBEM) RPGs. The origins of this style of role-playing are unknown, but it most likely originated in some form during the mid-to-late 1980s when BBS systems began gaining in popularity. Usually it is played through 'Script' and 'Story' format, both styles are interchangeable and work well but it depends on which the player prefers, or which the human administrator insists upon. Script format is a simple stating of what each character is saying, post by post, with little to no mention of said characters' actions, whereas Story format requires that the character's actions be mentioned, including the surroundings and a general description of what is going on.

=== Real-time human-moderated ===
Some games rely entirely upon human moderators to dictate events, and physical print books for rules sets. Such games may use code dice-rollers, to generate random results, and may include databases for the purposes of maintaining character records. Interaction between characters is controlled by communication between individual players (with each other) and with moderators (who portray non-player characters). Communication software and database options vary, from the DigiChat front-end / character database back-end pairing pioneered by Conrad Hubbard at White Wolf Publishing, to the numerous AOL, hangouts and Yahoo chats with hosted character databases. Many games also choose to play on Internet Relay Chat on networks such as DarkMyst and SorceryNet. More robust options are available on many virtual tabletops. Some virtual tabletops include text chat in addition to map and image sharing, campaign management and more. Free-form games may even do away with database integration or dice-rollers entirely and rely upon individual players to keep their own records, with online community reputation dictating how other players react. This form of game has spawned many variants in East Asia, including the popular Japanese 'annkosure'(あんこスレ) and the Chinese 'national policy'(国策).

== Psychology of roleplaying ==
Although an undeveloped field, there exists some research done on people who roleplay online. One interesting facet of roleplaying online is the instance of a roleplayer acting as a character of a different gender. One study was conducted in the Journal of Computer Game Culture, which discussed this phenomenon of cross-gendered play. In the study, it was found that roleplayers would create opposite gendered characters to revel in their own embodiment as alternative beings. This was a form of conscious adoption of the 'bodies' that the player could not physically 'own.' Although this creates a tension between the avatar of the character and the user, it is a tension that seems to not stand in the way of anything as players often show unselfconsciousness.

Additionally, research on online personalities has been done that could potentially extrapolate to the phenomena of online roleplaying. Researcher J. Suler found that, despite the various layers hiding the person behind the character, there is still a presence of the true personality of the roleplayer. Suler, in their study, highlighted several reasons for this extended emotional expression:

- Dissociative Anonymity in that the roleplayer tends to not see the similarity between their online self and their offline self, although they are but two sides of the same coin.
- Invisibility in that there is no worry about appearances when interacting online. This can lead to increased emotional expression as well.
- Asynchronicity in that users can respond when they have time to, and there is no pressure to respond emotionally. This allows a better procession of emotions and thus heightened expression of the player's emotions.
