= BatMUD =

- Developer: Project community
- Engine: LPMud
- Platform: Platform independent
- Release: 1990
- Genre: Fantasy MUD
- Mode: Multiplayer

BatMUD is a medieval fantasy MUD, established in 1990. BatMUD is Finland-based and operated and owned by Balanced Alternative Techniques ry ("B.A.T. ry"), which is not a non-profit organization, officially registered 1994 in Helsinki, Finland.

By 2006, over 100,000 players had frequented the game, making it one of the largest text-based multiplayer games on the Internet. In the beginning of 2008, it had over 30,000 subscriptions. At the end of 2011, number of subscriptions was similarly over 30,000 giving BatMUD a flat growth (number of new players equal those who no longer frequent the game). It has been called a "very popular and complex game".

== History, Legal and Development ==
A screenshot of one of numerous login screens displayed by BatMUD

BatMUD was one of the first LPMuds and has been online with only a few, if any minor breaks since 14 April 1990. The game was initially set-up by a wizard who named himself Jaf, followed by many volunteer coders, all becoming wizards in the process. The MUD's name comes from the name of the server the game was first hosted on, batman.cs.hut.fi. Since then, BatMUD has relocated several times, at one point residing in Oulu, Finland. Between November 2007 and August 2021, the main BatMUD servers were co-located in the two data centers of Nebula in Helsinki, Finland. BatMUD moved to a new data center, Ficolo's The Air in Vantaa, Finland, in August 2021 and is running on dedicated servers with redundant connectivity.

Despite its age, the MUD is constantly evolving. Due to the complex features, BatMUD may be a bit overwhelming for a newcomer.

=== Notable (external) events, timeline ===
In September 1994, the organization Balanced Alternative Techniques ry was officially registered in the "Joint corporate information system of the National Board of Patents and Registration and the Tax Administration" of Finland. The game was also previewed in the gaming magazine Pelit and was highly praised for its rich set of features, scoring over 90/100 points.

In 2004, B.A.T. ry applied for the BatMUD trademark and "BatMUD" was registered as a trademark by the United States Patent and Trademark Office on April 5, 2005. Also, a 91-page Pro graduation thesis emerges from the University of Lapland, themed "Artificial Intelligence in text-based computer games' dramaturgy. Study subjects: Nethack and BatMUD", Audiovisual Mediaculture written by Jussi Huhtala (in Finnish).

In February 2007, a 100-page Pro graduation master's thesis with the topic "Virtual gift - Trading gifts in BatMUD virtual community" in cultural anthropology for the University of Jyväskylä was published, written by a non-player in Finnish.

BatMUD has a wide variety of races. Player killing is lightly moderated.

== Virtual community and Playerbase ==
It is arguable that BatMUD formed one of the earliest virtual communities of gamers on the Internet. What marks the community significant, is the active operation and participation of the individuals within the virtual community. Several conventions and events are being held across the world, with one of the most notable probably being the Indiana, U.S. based Campcon, being held for the 11th consecutive year in June, 2009 — a real life gathering of active participants of the BatMUD community. Similar events are held in Europe and Scandinavia every year.

BatMUD provides a range of interplayer communication methods, allowing the players to talk and chat. Though the majority (about 2/3) of the players reside in Finland, the game itself is wholly in English, enabling it to host a large player base from several countries, including many European countries, the United States, Canada and Australia. Together with roleplay not being strictly enforced, the common language of English allows debates to flourish.

With about one hundred players simultaneously online, it is also one of the largest traditional MUDs. However, with the rise of massively multiplayer online games its popularity has fallen off in recent years with fewer new players joining. Aggressive efforts have been made to make the MUD more newbie friendly but most players continue to be well established players who have invested months or years into the game. As with many other popular online games, addiction is not unknown.

BatMUD employs a virtual economy, with players selling rare items and favours to each other in the game's internal currency. Sale of characters or equipment for real life money is forbidden. If it has occurred, it has not been a major problem.

== Influence ==
BatMUD was the first MUD played by Matt "Sarapis" Mihaly, founder of Iron Realms Entertainment. Mihaly became a wizard on BatMUD, but was banned for making a room that trapped and disabled other wizards.
