= Virtual goods =

Non-physical goods

Virtual goods are non-physical objects and money purchased for use in online communities or online games. Digital goods, on the other hand, may be a broader category including digital books, music, and movies. Virtual goods are a subclass of intangible goods.

Including digital gifts and digital clothing for avatars, virtual goods may be classified as services instead of goods and are usually sold by companies that operate social networking services, community sites, or online games. Sales of virtual goods are sometimes referred to as microtransactions, and the games that use this model are usually referred to as freemium games.

== Virtual money ==
Virtual money (or in-game currency) is used to purchase virtual goods within a variety of online communities, which include social networking websites, virtual worlds and online gaming sites.

A key revenue driver within social media, virtual currencies are specific within each game and are used to purchase in-game goods. Characters or avatars in virtual worlds own things within the context of the virtual world and users will collect each games' virtual currency to purchase land, supplies and various items used to enhance their status and add points. Some virtual currencies are time-based, relying upon measurement of in-game achievements in order to accrue exchangeable points.

== History ==
The first virtual goods to be sold were items for use in MUDs, early, graphical online multiplayer games on the PLATO system and text-only games on other computers. This practice continued with the advent of MMORPGs. Players would sell virtual goods, such as swords, coins, potions, and avatars, to each other in the informal sector. While this practice is forbidden in most blockbuster online games, such as World of Warcraft, many online games now derive revenue from the sale of virtual goods.

When Iron Realms Entertainment began auctioning items to players of its MUD, Achaea, Dreams of Divine Lands, in 1997, it became the first company to profit from the sale of virtual goods. But it wasn't until the mid-2000s, with companies like Korean Cyworld leading the way, that virtual good sales became instituted as a legitimate revenue-making scheme.

Virtual goods may continue to be a primarily Asian phenomenon, as between 2007–2010 70% of worldwide sales were made in this region.

=== Revenue ===
In 2009, games played on social networks such as Facebook, games that primarily derive revenue from the sale of virtual goods, brought in US$1 billion, and that is expected to increase to 1.6 billion in 2010. Worldwide, US$7.3 billion was made from virtual goods that same year.

Estimates of the future market for these small items vary wildly depending upon who is making the prediction. 2013 sales will be US$4 billion according to one analyst and a year later reach 14 billion according to a different analyst.

In 2010, a virtual space station in the game Entropia Universe sold for $330,000.

The popular, free-to-play video game Fortnite: Battle Royale generated more than $1 billion in revenue across all platforms. This revenue comes entirely from in-game purchases, which — in Fortnite's case — offer no competitive advantage to the game.

== Research ==
In online games, virtual goods could be lost due to some unexpected reasons. This brings problems for service providers as well as purchaser. Encryption techniques primarily used for other purposes may, here too, provide functionality. These may include access control, hashing, encryption, digital certificates, and fingerprinting.

== Illicit sale ==
While many companies have embraced exchanging cash for virtual goods, the practice is forbidden in most blockbuster games, which derive income from subscription fees. This does not deter all players from saving playing time by illicitly buying in-game currency with real-world cash from an alternate source, violating their agreement with the game's operator in the process.

China outlawed the practice of buying real-world goods with virtual currency in 2009, something that had become popular in some parts of the country.

== Virtual goods purveyors ==
- Cellufun
- Changyou
- Cyworld
- Facebook
- Gaia online
- Habbo hotel
- Hi5
- Hotornot
- IMVU
- Kongzhong
- Nexon
- Ning
- Iron Realms Entertainment
- Playdom
- Playfish
- Second Life Marketplace
- RuneScape
- Slide.com
- SmallWorlds
- Sony Online Entertainment
- Valve
- Tencent
- World of Warcraft
- Xbox Live Marketplace
- Zynga
- Flirtomatic
- OPSkins

== See also ==
- Skin gambling
- Walled garden (technology)
- Virtual economy
