= Armageddon (MUD) =

1991 video game

- Developer: Cat Rambo
- Engine: DikuMUD
- Platform: Cross-platform
- Release: 1991
- Genre: Multi-user dungeon
- Mode: Multiplayer

Armageddon, frequently abbreviated Arm, was a Multi-user dungeon (MUD) set in a desert world called Zalanthas. It was founded in 1991 by Dan Brumleve, Nasri Hajj, and Santiago Zorzopulos in Urbana, Illinois. It required its players to focus on role-playing. It ultimately closed on October 29, 2024.

== Setting ==
Armageddon's login screen

Armageddon's setting began with a heavy influence from Dark Sun, Dune, and other fantasy and science fiction sources, such as The Morgaine Stories by C. J. Cherryh, and Robert Asprin's Thieves' World, but had since grown and evolved. While some of these elements were still part of the campaign, development was not focused on maintaining a commitment to those influences due to a prior conflict with Wizards of the Coast over source material. Some conflicting material, such as the existence of kanks, a creature considered intellectual property by Wizards of the Coast, was removed as a result.

The game world had two city-states called Allanak and Tuluk. Allanak had been accessible to players for the entirety of the game's existence, whereas Tuluk had been frequently closed and re-opened throughout the game's history. The city populaces comprised commoners trying to live from day to day, nobles working to rise in power, and templars, civic officials who enforced the will of the cities' Sorcerer-Kings.

=== City-States ===
==== Allanak ====
Allanak was the setting's original city-state, and was a class-based society with a long and decadent history. It once ruled the known world, but had since retreated back to its own borders. Allanak's expansion was orchestrated by the game's players, as was the subsequent loss of these territories. For many within Allanak, this collapse went unnoticed amid a self-absorbed orgy of violence and pleasure. Public displays of torture, violent and bloody arena matches, and tremendous indulgences of depravity were typical of Allanak, with the templars exercising power with near impunity.

==== Tuluk ====
The other city-state of Tuluk was a young, energetic caste-based society. Player-influenced events led to the people of Tuluk throwing off the yoke of Allanak's oppression, bringing a sense of growth, expansion, and opportunity that made Tuluk a center of political maneuvering. Tuluk was ruled with silent oppression, with people who broke the law simply disappearing, fostering a secretive and distrustful atmosphere.

During the occupation of Tuluk, the nobles survived by relying on the common caste to hide them. This developed a closeness between castes that survived to the game's end. The nobility and the common caste often operatied closely together, though social boundaries such as a taboo against sexual contact between the castes remained.

Despite Tuluk's player-led history, staff unanimously decided that Tuluk would be closed to players on April 27, 2015, which caused a massive exodus of players who quit the game. It was then reopened in July 2021.

=== Outposts and Tribes ===
Smaller outposts and safe havens existed in Zalanthas. They generally struggled to remain independent from the city-states. These communities provided sanctuary from the dangers of the wastes and from the deadly politics and tyranny of Allanak and Tuluk, but typically had harsh and unforgiving local law enforcement. Nomadic tribes had a precarious existence in the wastes, working to survive while fending off beasts, raiders and magickers.

=== Magickers ===
Magickers, those who use arcane powers, were seen with dread, hatred and loathing. Tuluk banned them, while Allanak subjugated their elementalists with gemmed collars; sorcerers were killed mercilessly by either city-state. To survive, magickers mastered their respective elements, or in the case of sorcerers, their inherently tremendous well of power. The magick system in Armageddon used to feature eight distinct magick classes, seven based on elementalism and the eighth on sorcery. However, these classes were changed into subclasses, allowing players to play characters with primarily non-magical skills as well as spells. It featured fifteen elementalist subclasses across six elements, with one previously playable element no longer available. The subclasses divided each element's available spells. There were also four sorcery subclasses, each with roughly a quarter of the original sorcerer's spell list.

=== Muls ===
Armageddon included the mul race of human-dwarf crossbreeds found in the Dark Sun setting. They were primarily bred by noble houses as gladiatorial slaves for the arenas of Allanak and Tuluk. Roleplaying guidelines from Armageddon suggested that muls, being sterile, often suffered from a sense of meaninglessness.

== Game characteristics ==
In a departure from genre convention, there were no levels to be gained in Armageddon; a player character's fighting prowess, like their ability at woodcrafting or bartering, was measured by skills which rose through use—a player's skill level was only communicated to them through broad tiers such as the following, from lowest to highest: novice, apprentice, journeyman, advanced, master. Skills were raised through constant repetition and failure.

"Perma-death" was another major game element; when a player character died in Armageddon, it was a one-time, permanent matter. These factors were intended to help players focus on roleplaying realistically through giving them a true fear of death and a greater concern for their character's interaction with the world than with a numerical skill percentage. Staff offered resurrections for characters that arose from staff mistakes, game bugs, or out-of-character collusion among the killers. However, they did not offer resurrections in the event of out-of-character griefing.

Players were expected to provide a detailed description for their characters. In a departure from how, in many aspects, Armageddon worked to have the game heavily model characters and their interactions rather than relying on human interpretation, descriptions are "flat" text and "their effects are not regulated algorithmically".

As a result of internal controversy, the MUD had developed player conduct rules regarding cybersex that required prior consent for anyone to roleplay sexual interaction with another player character. Until September 2019, it was possible for players to play minor characters, which resulted in cybersex between adult and child characters. The game increased the minimum age of characters to 16.

== Technical infrastructure ==
Armageddon was based on DikuMUD, and was written mainly in C, with elements of JavaScript. It was unusual in being based on a DikuMUD infrastructure rather than one of the MU* systems more typically used for roleplaying-focused MUDs.

In 2006, a major overhaul to Armageddon called Armageddon Reborn, or more commonly called in the community: Armageddon 2.0 was announced. On May 15, 2012, the project was officially cancelled.

== Decline ==
Various announcements and changes to the game resulted in players departing from the game. After the cancellation of the Armageddon Reborn project, there was a noticeable drop in players. A similar drop can be seen after the initial closure of Tuluk in 2015. The game tracks unique logins per week, which is a measure of how many unique accounts logged into the game in a given week. Since each player has one account, this number signifies how many players connected to the game on a given week. This number was 267 on the last week of 2010, 245 in the last week of 2015, 208 in the last week of 2016, and 171 in the last week of 2020. The average player count of 2021 is roughly 150 players per week, which is comparable to or less than most other roleplaying MUDs currently open today.

=== Sexual harassment ===
On 24 February 2023, a former player posted details of sexual harassment conducted in-game and out-of-game and pointed out that Shalooonsh, an administrator of Armageddon, was responsible. This resulted in the former player being banned from the game. On 27 February, Armageddon staff announced that Shalooonsh had stepped down voluntarily and did not provide further comment. Amidst an outcry, the staff opted to shut down the game's general discussion board for a few days. When it reopened, it would only accept feedback on how to improve the game as well as the community's culture. The earlier message of Shalooonsh's voluntary resignation was amended to state that he was fired, albeit for being rude to the game's players, and he was given the option of dictating how his departure from staff would be announced to the players.

=== Seasons announcement ===
On 7 December 2023 following a continued decline of player numbers, it was announced that after 32 years of continuous history, the game would be shutting down for several months to relaunch under a seasonal model. The first season is said to involve a 50-year time jump, focusing on the city of Allanak. According to the announcement, each setting will focus on a different time and part of the setting, consolidating the playable area, with the game closing between seasons to allow staff time to plan and prepare. In addition, staff will no longer be allowed to play characters during an active season, and overall will be streamlined and updated.

In a Q&A thread on the official discussion forum, it was revealed that the decision was top-down and the majority of game staff had not been consulted. Brokkr, a producer of Armageddon, revealed other explored options included making the game invite-only. Following the announcement, player numbers fell to an all-time low. The announcement has been extremely divisive amongst players. The game was initially scheduled to reopen sometime between April 10, 2024 and May 10, 2024, but it was announced on April 19, 2024 that the game would open on June 15, 2024.

=== Closure ===
On October 21, 2024, the game's owners announced that Armageddon would close due to an internal leak that compromised the game's planning as well as player privacy. Producers also commented in the community's Discord server that out-of-game information networks had been created by players to spread this information and dishonestly utilize it for an in-game advantage. They stated that they would give their final announcement on the game's fate on October 29, 2024. On that day, the staff announced the game's permanent closure and the community rules changed to allow open discussion of in-character information.

== Reception ==
Armageddon has been praised as a "complex and professional" MUD that facilitates "high caliber role playing". However this praise has been overshadowed by many negative reviews on websites that feature Armageddon, such as The MUD connector or the Sub-Reddit r/MUDs. Among the negative reviews are many scandals which are most notably mentioned on r/MUDs, which detail many issues the game and its staff has caused upon the playerbase. Such as sexual harassment allegations towards the staff member called Shalooonsh.

A separate discussion board centered on discussion without Armageddon's rules controlling the content posted regarding the MUD was founded in early 2013. It has since attracted over 800 members, including several prominent former players and former staff members, including a former Producer of the game, who represented the highest level of the game's staff.

A spinoff game called Apocalypse MUD was created and played by former players and staff members of the game.

== Points of interest ==
In 1994, Armageddon was found to be one of the top 20 destinations for telnet sessions at National Capital Freenet.

The MUD's staff took pride in having a mission statement that describes administrators' accountability and priorities, which included stability, game balance, consistency, and a "Gee-Whiz Factor".

A major contributor to, and evangelist for, Armageddon has been science fiction and fantasy writer Cat "Sanvean" Rambo.
