= Kongzhong =

Kongzhong Corporation
- Traded as: Nasdaq: KZ
- Founded: May 6, 2002; 24 years ago
- Founder: Nick Yang
- Headquarters: Beijing, China
- Key people: Leilei Wang (CEO)
- Number of employees: 1,000 (2008)
- Website: www.kongzhong.com (Chinese)

Kongzhong
- Simplified Chinese: 空中网
- Literal meaning: Air Networks
Transcriptions
Standard Mandarin
- Hanyu Pinyin: Kōngzhōng wǎng

Kongzhong Corporation is a Chinese company that provides value-added services including video games via the Internet and various mobile networks. These include or included mobile web content, such as mobile message boards, WAP websites, and electronic books; ring tones; ringback tones; mobile games; and Internet games.

== Games ==
While the company was making subscription-based mobile games as early as 2005, its mobile games business expanded with the 2012 acquisition of Noumena AKA Nuomina, developer of a "cross-platform mobile game engine" that allows games to be played on Android, iOS, and with HTML5. Some early mobile games were coded in Java.

The company doesn't confine itself to mobile games exclusively. It has a license to operate World of Tanks, other Wargaming properties, and Guild Wars 2 in China. It also operates a handful of self-developed titles. The company derives revenue from some of these massively multiplayer online games, such as World of Tanks, through the sale of virtual goods.

== Mobile content ==
A pioneer mobile value-added services provider, the company's first such products were for WAP. Kongzhong has, as of 2007, a partnership with Opera Software that allows a mobile version of the latter company's Opera browser to be downloaded in China. Kongzhong may have patterned its early mobile business model off of Japanese companies that successfully provided WAP-based value-added services to a domestic audience in the 1990s and early 2000s. Between 2005 and 2007 the company was being described as a provider of 2.5G mobile value-added services.

== History ==
Founded by serial entrepreneur Nick Yang in 2002 with venture capital funding, he may no longer be able to play an active role.

In 2013 the company participated in an effort to locate a Flying Tigers P-40 thought to have crash landed in a Yunnan province lake in 1942.

== Lawsuits ==
A securities class-action lawsuit against Kongzhong Corporation was settled for $3.5 million in 2006. The complaint stemmed from a perception that prior to the issuance of an IPO, the company likely provided a misleading prospectus.
