= You Sexy Thing (book) =

2021 science fiction book by Cat Rambo

- First edition
- Author: Cat Rambo
- Language: English
- Genre: Science fiction; Space opera
- Publisher: Starscape
- Publication date: November 16, 2021
- Publication place: United States
- Pages: 304
- ISBN: 978-1-250-26930-0

You Sexy Thing is a science fiction novel by American writer Cat Rambo, published on November 16, 2021 by Tor Books' imprint Starscape. It tells the story of Captain Niko Larsen, who left the Holy Hive Mind by becoming a chef and opening a restaurant, but eventually returns to action when a ship leads her to pirate space.

== Reception ==
Publishers Weekly called the story "clever" and "thoroughly entertaining", praising Rambo for having created credible characters. The Library Journal gave the novel a starred review, lauding it as "delightful [and] action-filled," and "packed with engaging alien species (...) and witty references."

In Locus Online, Liz Bourke compared the novel to Tim Pratt's Axiom trilogy, describing it as "fast (and) zippy" with "some surprisingly substantial emotional heavy lifting under its hood." Bourke also noted the story's "nuanced consideration of responsibility, personal ethics, class, and the nature of art." Adrienne Martini, writing for the same magazine, talked about the allusions the novel makes to other science fiction works, such as Farscape, Star Wars and The Hitchhiker's Guide to the Galaxy. Martini goes on to say You Sexy Thing is not "something right on the cutting edge of the genre", but it's a "cozy" story.
