= Flirtomatic =

Online dating site

- Type: Private
- Industry: Social networking service
- Founded: (2005)
- Founder: Avi Azulai, Mark Curtis
- Headquarters: London, United Kingdom
- Number of locations: Los Angeles, U.S.
- Area served: United Kingdom, Germany, Australia, Spain, Italy, Ireland, and United States
- Key people: Avi Azulai (Chairman), Neil Goldberg (CEO), James Stockton (CFO),
- Owner: Handmade Mobile Entertainment, Ltd.
- Number of employees: 36
- Website: www.flirtomatic.com

Flirtomatic was an online flirting and social networking service for people connected to the Internet via mobile phone or PC. Operated by Handmade Mobile Entertainment, Flirtomatic was named the number one mobile dating site in the U.S. in a study by the mobile measurement company Ground Truth.

Flirtomatic allows members to connect on the basis of preferences, interests, location and other information stored in their profile; chat with other users; send immediate messages with graphics and photos; rate other members; and find user-generated editorial content relating to flirting and dating. Flirtomatic has virtual currency known as FlirtPoints, which members can purchase and use to buy additional services, such as virtual goods, and pay to promote or advertise their profile within the service and through alert features. About 80 percent of its members access Flirtomatic via mobile phone.

Flirtomatic is available to mobile users in Britain, Germany, Australia, Spain, Italy and the United States. The service is available on iPhone, Android, BlackBerry and Ovi and has integrated Facebook into its services. Flirtomatic has partnerships with AT&T, Verizon, Virgin Mobile, Cricket, Vodafone, T-Mobile, Orange, MetroPCS and ninemsn and has attracted mobile advertising from companies such as Fiat, Peugeot, NatWest, O2, Vodafone, Rimmel, Samsung, Walkers, Orange, 3, McDonald's, H&M and Sony Pictures.

The service, open to users 18 and older, has 3.5 million (1.5 million in the U.S.) registered users. Flirtomatic users average six logins a day while its iPhone users check in nine times a day.

The company generates revenues from online advertising and value-added services paid for through carrier billing, premium SMS and card payments. Flirtomatic monitors its site in order to maintain a PG-rated content.

== History ==
Flirtomatic was founded by Avi Azulai and Mark Curtis in 2005. Azulai, the company chairman, previously founded iTouch, the London Stock Exchange-listed mobile entertainment business sold for £180 million ($284 million) in June 2005. Mark Curtis, the former CEO, left the company in July 2011 when Neil Goldberg took over the CEO role.

Fjord created and developed the flirting theme, invented the service's name and was instrumental in the design of all digital interfaces. The company also developed such features as Flirtograms and Supersnogs. The service started as a Fjord concept when Nokia enlisted the company to propose five ideas for mobile, one of which became Flirtomatic. "When we described dating on the mobile and what it'd feel like, we talked about messaging, fun, humor, a light touch," Curtis said to WeLoveBusiness.co.uk. "Some bright spark piped up and said, 'We're describing flirting' to which the rest of us thought, 'Wow! There's an idea. How could we create an application that could make flirting as easy, fun and good as it possibly can be for mobile?' " Fjord took a lead role in securing funding to build and launch Flirtomatic, which is now independently run.

Flirtomatic's proprietary multimedia interaction platform was designed to provide a consumer entertainment proposition that stood between the popular social networking and online dating services. The company's emphasis on flirting has differentiated it from more traditional online dating sites geared toward matching users with one another.

Flirtomatic had 100,000 users in July 2006, with a Flirtomatic poll revealing that online flirting peaks daily at 4:30 p.m. "due to workers trying to waste that last hour before the end of their working day," according to MediaWeek. By November 2006, Flirtomatic had 185,000 registered users.

The following year, Flirtomatic adopted a "freemium" model, switching from subscriptions for mobile to mobile advertising revenues and premium services.

Flirtomatic reached 1 million users and had a 475 percent revenue increase in 2008. The company also expanded into Germany that year and into Australia in 2009.

In 2008, flirtomatic violated the British flirtbox trademark by naming its chat window "flirtbox". When flirtomatic tried to enter the German market and cooperated with the German broadcaster Prosieben, also the German flirtbox trademark was violated as the on-air trailers showed the flirtbox phrases on TV.

In Dec. 2009, Flirtomatic ranked 9th in mobile Internet use in the UK, at 55 million minutes for the month, according to GSMA Mobile Media Metrics. Flirtomatic sold 100,000 virtual gifts in the four weeks leading up to Christmas of that year, including 19,455 Christmas stockings.

Flirtomatic launched an advertising-funded iPhone application in January 2010, which was made available for free via the Apple Inc. App Store. Later that year, Flirtomatic was made available on Android, BlackBerry and Ovi and integrated Facebook into its services. Flirtomatic also expanded into Spain and Italy.

In April 2010, Mobile Commerce, which delivers 25 percent of all mobile Internet searches from UK carrier portals, released a report that found that Flirtomatic was the 15th most commonly searched term on the UK mobile web in 2009.

During the 2010 election for UK prime minister, Flirtomatic posted mock profiles of the three main candidates and invited members to "snog" them. By May 5, 2010, 10,000 Flirtomatic users weighed in: 34.4 percent chose Liberal Democrat candidate Nick Clegg, 33.9 percent picked Conservative candidate David Cameron and 31.7 percent selected Labour candidate Gordon Brown.

Flirtomatic raised $18 million in overall funding by December 2010, with $10 million secured that year. Among the investors: Nauta Capital, Doughty Hanson Technology Ventures, Seraphim Capital, Oxford Capital Partners and company chairman Avi Azulai.

In 2011 Flirtomatic was re-designed as the original designs primarily targeted young people - but in order to generate revenue, especially older people were needed.

== Reception ==
Flirtomatic in 2008 topped The Mediatech 100, a list of the hottest mediatech companies in Europe compiled by Library House, a Cambridge, UK, research firm.

In September 2009, Flirtomatic was ranked #4 in the Guardian's Tech Media Invest Top 100 companies.

Flirtomatic ranked eighth in mobile downloads in the U.S. in March 2010

Flirtomatic was named the number one mobile dating site in the U.S. in August 2010, accounting for 65 percent of the summer audience for mobile dating, according to a study by the mobile measurement company Ground Truth.

In a January 2011 poll of its contacts in the mobile content business, Mobile Entertainment named Mark Curtis one of the top 50 executives in the field.

In 2014 Flirtomatic was silently switched off as no additional venture capital could be acquired. Flirtomatic had not managed to generate a revenue stream that made the business model independent from venture capital.

== Awards ==
- Best Social Media, Mobile Entertainment Awards 2009 and 2010
- Best Use of Mobile and the Grand Prix, NMA Effectiveness Awards 2009
- Community 2008; Social Networking 2009 and Social Media 2010, the Meffy Awards
- Overall Mobile Web Category, Smaato Mobile Advertising Awards 2009
