= And the Last Trump Shall Sound =

2020 alternate history novel

- First edition
- Author: Harry Turtledove, James K. Morrow and Cat Rambo
- Language: English
- Genre: Alternate history
- Publisher: CAEZIK SF & Fantasy
- Publication date: September 22, 2020
- Publication place: United States
- Media type: E-book and print (paperback)

And the Last Trump Shall Sound is an American alternate history book written by Harry Turtledove, James K. Morrow and Cat Rambo. It was published on September 22, 2020 by Caezik SF & Fantasy. The book contains three stories: Turtledove wrote "The Breaking of Nations", Morrow wrote "The Purloined Republic" and Rambo wrote "Because It Is Bitter". The title is a reference to 1 Corinthians 15:52.

== Plot ==
During his presidency, Donald Trump is reelected in the 2020 presidential election, but dies during a second coronavirus outbreak in 2024. As a result of his death, Vice President Mike Pence succeeds him and oversees the actions of the United States being transformed into a right-wing, Christian fundamentalist, authoritarian state which eventually leads to the West Coast states of California, Oregon and Washington seceding from the US and forming their own nation called Pacifica.

Pence is elected to a full term in 2024 and reelected in 2028 with Lindsey Graham as his vice president. During his presidency. Roe v. Wade is overturned in 2026 with abortions being criminalized and thousands of women dying as a result of illegal procedures, concentration camps are established near the US-Mexican border to imprison migrants, illegal immigrants and political opponents, non-Christians including Jews, Muslims and Sikhs fall victim to fatal religious and racist attacks, and LGBTQ+ peoples are persecuted and eventually classified as sex offenders.

The United States Congress becomes a Republican-dominated rubber stamp, state autonomy in Democratic states becomes undermined with state governments being removed and replaced for non-compliance, Christian fundamentalism is endorsed by the federal government, and news broadcasters including CNN and MSNBC became right-wing subsidiaries of Fox known as Fox-CNN and Fox-MSNBC, respectively, while The New York Times gets shut down completely as part of restrictions on freedom of the press.

Pence eventually works around the Twenty-second Amendment by running as Vice President on the bottom of the Republican ticket with Devin Nunes in 2032. The ticket wins and Nunes resigns from the presidency shortly after taking office, allowing Pence to retake the presidency and to appoint Rick Santorum as his new vice president.
