= SchoolNet =

Canada's SchoolNet was a federal educational technology project in partnership with provinces, school boards, non-profit organizations, and the private sector, funded primarily by Industry Canada and developed by Ingenia Communications Corporation to promote the effective use of information and communications technologies (ICT) in libraries and schools across the country. Many important early Canadian ICT programs fell under the SchoolNet umbrella, including Computers for Schools, LibraryNet, First Nations SchoolNet, and Canada's Digital Collections. By 1997, SchoolNet brought internet access to all 433 First Nations schools under federal jurisdiction. Microsoft founder Bill Gates praised the program in the Edmonton Journal on November 26. 1995, stating that "SchoolNet is the leading program in the world in terms of letting kids get out and use computers."

Notable early projects included the SchoolNet MOO and the Special Needs Education (SNE) network. The MOO was abandoned by Industry Canada in 1998, but a non-profit corporation was set up to continue the site as MOO Canada Eh! From 1999-2001, SchoolNet funded Project Achieve MOO developed at the Knowledge Media Design Institute at the University of Toronto. Although acknowledged by executives at Industry Canada as "one of the most successful websites in terms of the level of interest" funding for the SNE was discontinued, and the project moved with its developer Keenan Wellar from Ingenia Communications Corporation to charitable organization LiveWorkPlay in 1997, before the site was discontinued when corporate sponsorship failed to materialize.

The SchoolNet project was active from 1995 to the early 2000s, and the site was taken offline in 2008.
