= TinyTIM =

TinyTIM is a MUSH created in 1990 by Sketch (Jason Scott Sadofsky) and Trout.Complex. It is the oldest running MUSH in existence, having held that status at least since 1995.

== History ==
TinyTIM's exact date of creation is unknown, but is observed by the staff and official history as March 18, 1990 (it is unlikely to be more than a week away from this date).

Based on the TinyMUD program, TinyTIM was created as a parody of other MUDs that were currently running, including TinyHELL and Islandia. While the original intent of the name was simply to parody the "Tiny-" prefix of the currently running TinyMUD games, it was later declared that this was both a combination of the singer "Tiny Tim" and "Tim the Enchanter" from Monty Python and the Holy Grail. The TinyMUD software required that object #1 be a "God" character, and this character was fashioned into a form of Tim the Enchanter, sealing the association.

It was installed on a machine owned by the GNU foundation (gnu.ai.mit.edu), using an account owned by Richard Stallman. At the time, Stallman's account had the same password as its username: "rms". TinyTIM's initial period of existence was one of constant deletions, as other users on the gnu.ai.mit.edu system would kill the process and remove the database of the MUD.

In July, 1990, TinyTIM was moved from the gnu.ai.mit.edu machine to a system hosted at the Supercollider in Texas.

In August, TinyTIM switched to the TinyMUSH 1.0 codebase, and was one of the first MUSHes. TinyTIM has diverged from nearly every other MUSH due to heavy modifications made around that time. As of 2024, TinyTIM is still in operation.

== Unique aspects ==
From the time that TinyTIM switched to MUSH-based code, the maintaining of the codebase was taken over by the Wizard/Administrator R'nice, who kept the program closed-source and made incremental and large-scale improvements to it for the next decade and beyond. Along the way, with suggestions from users of TinyTIM and his own research, R'nice created the first "@doing" command on a game, as well as indirect locks, regular expressions as locks, and a host of new flags and features.

TinyTIM rewrote its Help system from scratch, portions of which were used (with permission) in documentation for other code branches.

TinyTIM's co-founding wizard, Trout.Complex, has been a wizard on the same game for over 30 years without a break or sabbatical.

== Press and news mentions ==
On June 2, 1994, the NCSA "What's New" page, the main news site for the announcement of new websites, mentioned the TinyTIM homepage at www.tim.org. This drove tens of thousands of users both to the website and ultimately to the TinyTIM game, which was overwhelmed for over a month. The blurb read:

TinyTIM is now on the WWW! What's TinyTIM? In their own words, "Well, TinyTIM is the world's oldest running MUSH (Multi-User Shared Hallucination). We have 10,000 rooms, thousands of players, an affinity for poptarts and a clock that eats V'ger for breakfast. Since TinyTIM and the world of MUSHes is so funky anyway, the Wizards of TIM decided to add a WWW page to our machine. It has documentation, sounds, graphics, info on the game, and at least a couple pictures of cows. Plus, a mere click on an icon, and you're connected to TinyTIM itself! TinyTIM, by the way, requires no registration and has unlimited building for you experiment with. Come on in, join the fun, and remember: It's not just a game.... It's a really, really BIG game!

TinyTIM was also mentioned in Wired in their Net Surf section.

Sketch was interviewed by Barry Shell for Adbusters magazine in an article called "Cyber-Encounters of the First Kind", which appeared in 1993. The article was subsequently reprinted in December 1996 online.
