= Matt Mihaly =

Matthew Mihaly (born June 21, 1972) is an American CEO/founder of Iron Realms Entertainment, a game designer, executive, and entrepreneur. He is the founder and former CEO of Sparkplay Media. He is known for pioneering the sale of virtual assets and virtual currency in online games, dating to the late 1990s. His MUD pseudonym is Sarapis.

== Biography ==
Mihaly attended Cornell University in Ithaca, New York, receiving a bachelor's degree in political science in 1994. During college, he became involved with MUDs, especially Avalon: The Legend Lives, where he was a god, as well as BatMUD.

In 1996, Mihaly founded Iron Realms Entertainment and served as lead designer and producer on Achaea.

In 1997, he pioneered the Virtual Asset Sales (VAS) model, holding auctions for virtual weapons and armor in Achaea, the first business to use this business model.

In 1999, he built the first hard to soft currency exchange in an online game, allowing players to exchange earned in-game gold for purchased credits.

In 2000, he served as Senior Consultant to the Secretary-General of the United Nations-sponsored World Summit of Young Entrepreneurs, in New York, New York, leading development of a system with very low technology requirements to permit entrepreneurs in impoverished 3rd-world countries to participate.

He has since overseen the release of four additional successful MUDs. He speaks at conferences like Dragoncon, the Game Developers Conference and the Social Gaming Summit.

He served as technical editor on Richard Bartle's book, Designing Virtual Worlds, and contributed an essay to Lee Sheldon's book, Character Development and Storytelling for Games.

In 2007, Iron Realms announced it was spinning off Sparkplay Media from Iron Realms to produce Earth Eternal, a 3D anthropomorphic MMO built to be largely streamed on demand under his leadership.

In 2008, he raised $4.25 million from venture capital firms Redpoint Ventures and Prism Ventureworks in order to expand the development of Sparkplay's platform and games, and raised another $3 million subsequently.

In 2010, after never leaving Open Beta, Sparkplay Media ran out of money and sold Earth Eternal to a subsidiary of Time Warner in a joint venture in Asia. In the early morning hours of September 1, 2010, the Earth Eternal forums and game were taken offline. A Japanese version of the game, published by Sankando, who had licensed Earth Eternal from Sparkplay, was launched with some changes in 2011.

In 2013, he published a response to former Federal Reserve chairman Alan Greenspan entitled "Bitcoin and Intrinsic Value".

In 2014, he created Burn.Life, a site and blog about Burning Man, notably including the History of Burning Man.

In 2022, he created the Peter Mihaly Foundation, named after his brother who died in 1987, to award STEM scholarships to graduates of Ripon High School, in Wisconsin.

=== Games ===
- Achaea, Dreams of Divine Lands (Lead Designer, Producer; Iron Realms, 1997–2005)
- Aetolia, the Midnight Age (Creative Director; Iron Realms, 2001)
- Imperian (Creative Director; Iron Realms, 2003)
- Lusternia (Creative Director; Iron Realms, 2004)
- Midkemia Online (Creative Director; Iron Realms, 2009)
- Tears of Polaris (Creative Director; Iron Realms, 2008 - never released and permanently cancelled)
- Earth Eternal (Creative Director, Sparkplay Media 2009)
- Starmourn (Executive Producer, Creative Director; Iron Realms, 2017)

== Notes and references ==
- Wired article on Gleam
- "Computer Gaming World on Gleam". Computer Gaming World. September 2004. Archived from the original on November 9, 2006 – via FindArticles.
