= MicroMUSE =

- Developer: Project community
- Engine: MUSH, MUSE
- Platform: Platform independent
- Release: 1990
- Genre: Social/Educational MUD
- Mode: Multiplayer

MicroMUSE is a MUD started in 1990. It is based on the TinyMUSE system, which allows members to interact in a virtual environment called Cyberion City, as well as to create objects and modify their environment. MicroMUSE was conceived as an environment to allow people in far-flung locations to interact with each other, particularly college students with Internet access. A core group of users remain active.

== History ==
=== 1990 ===
MicroMUSE was founded as MicroMUSH by the user known as "Jin" in the summer of 1990 at California State University, Fresno. Based upon TinyMUSH, MicroMUSH was centered around Cyberion City, a space station orbiting Earth of the 24th century. The initial MicroMUSH database was largely due to the efforts of Jin and the Wizards who went by the online aliases "Trout_Complex", "Coyote", "Opera_Ghost", "Snooze", "Lord_Soth", "Erk", "Wai", "Star" and "Mama.Bear". Larry "Leet" Foard and "Bard" (later known as "Michael") were, along with Jin, the primary programmers. Other key leaders that handled administration included Moulton and Ender, who provided guidance to Jin on strategic direction.

The focus, at the time, primarily was communication and creativity. Users were encouraged to build "objects" and were given extensive leeway to create and communicate with other members. At times, it could be compared to a high-tech version of the wild west.

=== 1991 ===
Typical problems of growth and success, over time, led to issues with computing resources. Over 1,000 new objects were created monthly, and total users on MicroMUSH had surpassed 10,000. As Jin graduated from CSU Fresno in the fall of 1990, access to the server hosting MicroMUSH would be terminated. In April 1991, Jin flew to Massachusetts to meet with Moulton. Together, they visited a Professor at the Computer Science department at MIT. The Professor's middle-school aged daughter was one of the younger members of MicroMUSH and was learning how to program. The Professor generously offered the use of an idle server as a new home for MicroMUSH. Within days, MicroMUSH migrated to MIT. The name was officially changed to MicroMUSE during this same time period. MUSE or Multi-User Simulation Environment was chosen to better represent the charter.

=== 1992 ===
Through 1992, the focus of MicroMUSE continued to change, though not very noticeably to existing users. New users were given a smaller "quota" of object which they could build. The game was extremely popular at this point. Users could log in at almost any time of day and find at least thirty active people.

=== 1993 ===
By the end of 1993, the space engine, which had been developed within the original theme of MicroMUSE, was moved out of MicroMUSE. The focus was shifting; it became less about creativity and communication between random people across the internet, and more about bringing in primary-school children. The "quota" of objects was reduced, for all players, from as much as 100, down to 10 "objects". The game became more-heavily censored, as some of the leadership began to push a K-12-friendly environment throughout the game. Long-time users who did not like the change, and spoke out against it, were often banned from the game altogether.

=== 1994 ===
By the end of 1994, any semblance of what MicroMUSE had been was almost gone. A charter and bylaws were created, which officially changed the focus of MicroMUSE. The second developer had left the project, and Frnkzk became the head developer of MicroMUSE. The guidance of a "mentor" was required for anyone not pre-screened by the administration. By this point, the focus was solely education.

=== Post-1994 ===
The changes in focus and game policies, along with changing technology, caused a gradual decline in the number of core members using MicroMUSE.

== Counter-Movement ==
As the game changed drastically, in 1993 and 1994, very disorganized counter-movement began. There was no leader, and there were varying tactics.

=== Attacks on MicroMUSE ===
There were attacks on MicroMUSE, which would cause it to crash, by exploiting poorly written routines. Generally, these would either cause a buffer-overflow, or would cause an infinite loop. The attacks were usually carried out by users who had been removed from the game for violating the new policies that had gone into effect after they began playing.

MicroMUSE was using a highly customized version of TinyMUSE version 1.7b4. Many of these problems were fixed in version 1.8a4, and in later versions, but MicroMUSE suffered difficulty back-porting these changes into their version of the game.

With the eventual creation of new worlds using TinyMUSE, the attacks on MicroMUSE gradually ceased.

=== Alternative MUSE installations ===
Alternative TinyMUSE installations began to appear, based on the released version 1.8a4, which led to an argument over who "owned" TinyMUSE. At least one MicroMUSE administrator had fought against allowing other sites to use TinyMUSE as their codebase, and a small power-struggle took place between that administrator (Moulton) and the second primary developer (shkoo), who had taken over from the original primary developer (Jin). The dispute was finally settled, and the newer TinyMUSE version 1.8a4 was released to the public.

By the end of 1993, computer power was becoming much cheaper. One of the first alternatives, for instance, was run on an AMD 486/dx4-120, "over-clocked" to 160Mhz, with four megabytes of RAM.

Responsibility for the official development of TinyMUSE was never handed back to MicroMUSE.

== Today ==
Today's version of MicroMUSE Cyberion's residents are scholars who lived in a unique community dedicated to learning, teaching, and the preservation of knowledge. Dr. Barry Kort was instrumental in setting up MicroMUSE in its modern form, with assistance from Kevin Kane ("Frnkzk").

MicroMUSE / MuseNet received the 1996 National Information Infrastructure NII Award for pioneering innovations in Children's Education via the Internet.

The MicroMUSE Charter and Bylaws (1994) define the history, goals and purposes of MicroMUSE.
