= IfMUD =

ifMUD
- Developers: Liza Daly and project community
- Engine: PerlMUD
- Platform: Platform independent
- Release: 1997
- Genre: Interactive fiction MUD
- Mode: Multiplayer

ifMUD is a MUD associated with the rec.arts.int-fiction newsgroup accessible via telnet or a MUD client. It is central to the interactive fiction community, frequented by many of the genre's best-known writers. Every year, the XYZZY Awards are hosted on ifMUD during an online ceremony.

ifMUD was founded in 1997 by Liza Daly. It is written in the Perl computer programming language making use of an extensive hack of the earlier PerlMUD, with many additional features.

== Game characteristics ==
ifMUD is organized into areas, with a distinct area usually the work of a particular contributor or group of contributors and having its own interactive fiction plot. For example, Save Princeton was created by Jacob Weinstein and Karine Schaefer.

== Innovations ==
The tradition of SpeedIF, in which short interactive fiction works, created around story prompts, are developed and shared in a two-hour timeframe, was originated on ifMUD by David Cornelson.

== MUD bots ==
Two major bots exist on ifMUD, Alex and Floyd.

Floyd acts as an interpreter for many different IF writing platforms. It was named after a fictional character from the Planetfall game by Infocom.

Alex, a "parrot" bot named after Alex Pepperberg, keeps track of memos on any topic, editable by anyone, similar to a wiki. It was written by Dan Shiovitz and was inspired by the Perl infobot Purl.

== Reception ==
ifMUD has, at times, simultaneously been praised for its service to the interactive fiction community and criticized for fostering an excessively self-referential, socially impenetrable environment.

Its userbase has been described as a "small but friendly multinational tribe".
