= Amy S. Bruckman =

American professor (born 1965)

Amy Susan Bruckman
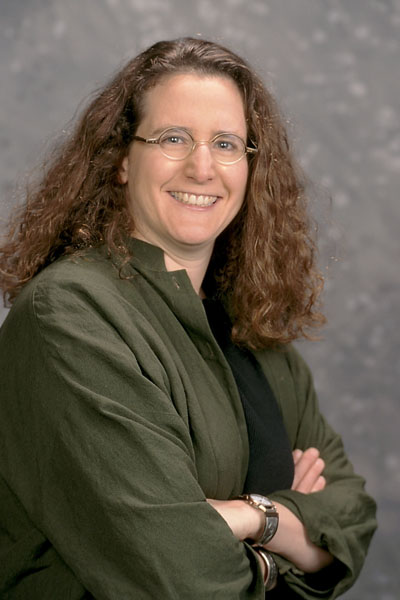
- Bruckman in 2001
- Born: 1965 (age 60–61); New York City, U.S.
- Education: Harvard University (BA); Massachusetts Institute of Technology (MA, PhD)
- Known for: MediaMOO, MOOSE Crossing
- Awards: MIT Technology Review TR100; AERA Jan Hawkins Award
- Scientific career
- Fields: Online communities, Learning sciences, Constructionist learning, Information ethics
- Workplaces: Georgia Tech, GVU Center
- Doctoral advisor: Mitchel Resnick

Amy Susan Bruckman (born 1965) is a professor at the Georgia Institute of Technology affiliated with the School of Interactive Computing and the GVU Center. She is best known for her pioneering research in the fields of online communities and the learning sciences. In 1999, she was selected as one of MIT Technology Review's TR100 awardees, honoring 100 remarkable innovators under the age of 35. In 2018, she was elected as an ACM Fellow.

== Early life and education ==
Amy S. Bruckman was born in New York, New York. She attended the Horace Mann School, an Ivy Preparatory School in New York City, graduating in 1983. Following that, Bruckman attended Harvard University for her undergraduate studies, earning a Bachelor of Arts degree in physics in 1987. She received a master's degree in 1991 from the Interactive Cinema Group at the MIT Media Lab, where she was advised by Glorianna Davenport. Her master's thesis described the Electronic Scrapbook, an intelligent home video editing system.

Bruckman went on to pursue a Ph.D. at the Media Lab in Mitchel Resnick's Epistemology and Learning Group. On January 20, 1993, Bruckman established MediaMOO, an online community for new media researchers and educators. The community, managed chiefly by Bruckman, developed a significant following for its time, eventually closing down seven years later. During this time, Bruckman also worked as a research assistant for Sherry Turkle on Turkle's influential book, Life on the Screen (1997). For her dissertation work, Bruckman developed MOOSE Crossing, a MOO-based constructionist learning environment in which young children could learn computer programming skills while building virtual objects.

== Georgia Tech ==
Upon her graduation from MIT in 1997, Bruckman accepted a position as an assistant professor at the Georgia Institute of Technology College of Computing. As a new Georgia Tech faculty member, Bruckman founded the Electronic Learning Communities (ELC) Lab and began setting up a program of research incorporating her interests in online communities and constructionist learning. She founded the Undergraduate Research Opportunities in Computing (UROC) program at Georgia Tech in 1998, modeling it after MIT's UROP. In 1999, Bruckman's research was supported by a prestigious grant awarded by the National Science Foundation's Faculty Early Career Development (CAREER) program. That same year, she was selected as one of Technology Review's 100 remarkable innovators under the age of 35. Her work at this time was described as "the most notable MOO research in education."

On July 22, 1999, Bruckman and graduate student Joshua Berman released The Turing Game, a multiplayer online game inspired by the Turing test that challenged players to explore issues of online identity. The game received national attention and was played by over 11,000 people from 81 countries and all seven continents.

In 2003, Bruckman received tenure and was promoted to the position of associate professor. In 2012, she was made a full professor. She was the interim chair of the School of Interactive Computing from July 2017 until December.

Bruckman currently directs the ELC Lab at Georgia Tech. She has published dozens of scholarly articles in peer-reviewed journals and has given invited presentations at high-profile academic conferences such as ICLS and CHI. Bruckman's most recent work, often done in conjunction with graduate students she advises, has dealt with topics in information ethics, game studies, social media use, computer-supported collaboration and wikis, and women in computing.

Her book Should You Believe Wikipedia? was published in 2022.

== Professional community leadership ==
Bruckman has taken on many leadership roles in service to her professional community, notably for the ACM Computer-Supported Cooperative Work and Social Computing (CSCW) conference. She was the General Co-chair for the 2013 conference and subsequently served as Chair of the CSCW Steering Committee.

== Recognition ==
In 2002, the American Educational Research Association presented Bruckman with the Jan Hawkins Award for Early Career Contributions to Humanistic Research and Scholarship in Learning Technologies. She was elected to the CHI Academy in 2018. She was also elected as an ACM Fellow in 2018 for "contributions to collaborative computing and foundational work in Internet research ethics".

== See also ==
- Computer-supported cooperative work
- Constructionism (learning theory)
- Social computing
