= Sequent (MUD) =

Sequent DikuMUD
- Developer: Raja Kushalnagar
- Engine: DikuMUD
- Platform: Platform independent
- Release: 1991
- Genre: Dungeons & Dragons MUD
- Mode: Multiplayer

Sequent was a DikuMUD derivative codebase developed by Raja Kushalnagar ("Duke of Sequent"). It was a text-based online role-playing game that was an accessible DikuMUD based MUD. It added several new playing areas with shorter text descriptions that was designed to be accessible to users with sensory disabilities. It also supported more players online at the same time by being hosted on a Sequent multi-processor machine at the University of California, Berkeley, and was first started in March 1991.

== History ==
The Sequent DikuMUD enhanced both the codebase and database of the DikuMUD Gamma version. The codebase enhancements increased the number of spells and guilds, plus supporting multiple active zones, chat channels and guilds. It added several new playing areas with shorter text descriptions that was designed to be accessible to users with sensory disabilities.

DikuMUD had been a great leveler and allowed people from diverse regions to connect and play together. People with sensory disabilities faced barriers in both social interaction and game playing in these games. DikuMUD were not accessible to people who could not see, but hear. Conversely, they were largely accessible to people who could see but not hear. The primary challenge was that there was too much information to scan through as they played the game. For instance, the average player had to type in commands to juggle regular checks of various properties such as movement, weapons and their range, status and cost, monitoring the text-based map to avoid dangerous or impassable terrain, being aware of and detecting enemy units and friendly units, communicating with others and relaying info, and much more.

People with visual disabilities did not find it easy to participate in these games, as they were entirely text-based. The text-based descriptions tended to be very long and verbose, which was difficult for many people with visual or auditory disabilities to process. For players with visual disabilities, it was difficult for them to keep up with the game pace compared with their sighted peers, as the average person listens at around 150 words per minute but is able to read at around 300 words per minute. Players with auditory disabilities were often not fluent in spoken or written English, and have a similar problem in that they are unable to read as fast as their hearing peers.

As a result, an avid DikuMUD player who had friends with visual disabilities at University of California at Berkeley, enhanced the DikuMUD codebase and database to make it more accessible to people with visual and aural disabilities. This DikuMUD, called Sequent, improved accessibility in by creating an alternate description in each room that consisted of shorter and more direct descriptions of the world, which reduced the amount of text by about half. Players with visual disabilities could then quickly scan for relevant keywords, and act more quickly. They were able to participate on a more equal footing, compared with their sighted peers, which has been confirmed by subsequent studies. This approach to add an accessibility option to condense text in DikuMUD was an early application of the principle of separating meaning from content. This follows HTML principles, which strive to encode meaning rather than appearance. As long as a page is coded for meaning, it is possible for alternative browsers to present that meaning in ways that are optimized for the abilities of individual users and thus facilitate the use by disabled users.

Twenty years after the passage of the Americans with Disabilities Act in 1991, nearly all computers and personal devices support screen readers for people with visual disabilities. Players with visual disabilities wanted more functional equivalence with their sighted peers—it was no longer enough to condense information for quick scanning and action. Some newer MUDs such as Materia Magica have adopted a new approach to double the bandwidth, which provides functional equivalence between visually disabled and sighted players by using two screen readers. The first screen reader processes the background scrolling text, while the second reader processes more urgent information in between or over the reading of the background scrolling text.

The codebase also included an option to spread client connections among multiple processors on the Sequent multiprocessor system and to run simultaneously on multiple processors on a Sequent server. The database enhancements included several new areas, 50 player levels and 10 administrative levels. Notable MUDs running on the Sequent codebase include Sojourn and its successor, TorilMUD.
