= Diversity University =

- Developers: Jeanne McWhorter, project community
- Engine: MOO
- Platform: Platform independent
- Release: 1993
- Genre: Educational MUD
- Mode: Multiplayer

Diversity University was the first MOO dedicated specifically for education. Like other MUDs, it was an online realm that allowed people to interact in real time by connecting to a central server, assuming a virtual identity within that realm, "teleporting" (in other words, transporting your character) or "walking" to virtual rooms, and holding text-based conversations with others who had entered the same virtual room. The MOO server kept track of which characters were in each virtual "room," so that the comments of each character would be sent back to the computers of every other person whose character was "in" the same virtual "room." What distinguished Diversity University from other MOOs was its central structuring metaphor as a virtual university campus, as well as its pioneering use for actual online classes.

== History and purpose ==
Diversity University was created in summer 1993 by its founder (and original "arch-wizard"), Jeanne McWhorter, then a sociology graduate student at the University of Houston. In an interview with a reporter, she described her initial purpose in creating the online educational environment: "It all began when I got interested in getting social workers online. ... Social workers all tend to be computerphobes — part of it is that we have it in our mind that computers dehumanize. I think computers do anything but — I think people are much more open and willing to talk about themselves when they're online." Josh Quittner continues, "McWhorter figured that Diversity University would be a way to attract educators and students to computing as a communications medium."

The overarching idea was a virtual, online university space, allowing teachers and students to interact in real time. Diversity University was originally hosted on a server at Embry-Riddle Aeronautical University, although it moved to two other server environments during its life, since it often struggled for financial support and institutional backing. Its final homes were Marshall University and the University of Wisconsin - Parkside.

Diversity University did not charge any hosting fees to faculty members and other educators who brought classes onto the MOO. Because the text-based interface required minimal computing resources for people to access the MOO, Diversity University espoused an egalitarian mission, which they articulated on their website:

"The mission of Diversity University is to develop, support and maintain creative and innovative environments and tools for teaching, learning and research through the Internet and other distributed computing systems, and to guide and educate people in the use of these and other tools, to foster collaboration in a synergistic climate, and to explore and utilize applications of emerging technology to these ends in a manner friendly to people who are disabled, geographically isolated or technologically limited".

== Structure ==
Although MOOs are virtual spaces — basically computer objects in a database — they are usually organized around a central spatial metaphor. For Diversity University that metaphor was a physical university campus, with buildings that represented the subject fields of the participants, along with other types of buildings that you might find on a typical university campus. In his master's thesis on "Design in Virtual Environments Using Architectural Metaphor," Dace A. Campbell used Diversity University's campus as an example of virtual architecture; one can see DU's "campus" structure as Figure 1.3 in that thesis.

Guests who connected to Diversity University landed in a "room" in the "Student Union," in a kind of orientation space, while registered characters would land in whatever "room" was their virtual home in that environment. Once in a room, characters could use commands to navigate around the virtual space. For example, they could type "out" to exit from the room to an adjoining room or hallway, and they could use the cardinal directions (n, s, e, w) to "move" in those directions from room to room, building to street, street to connected street, and also into other virtual buildings on the campus. When creating "rooms," therefore, people who had building rights on the MOO were encouraged to use the appropriate version of the command (@dig) so that they would create not a free-floating, unconnected room, but a room that was joined to another room (or hallway), in the appropriate virtual building, allowing users to "walk" around the MOO. Other commands, ranging from basic to advanced, were also supported.

Because the overarching structure was metaphorical, characters and guests on the MOO had the "magical" ability to "teleport" (or jump) from a room in one virtual building to another room "somewhere else" by using commands such as @go (to go to a room by its object number or name) and @join (to join another character in a room). Rooms could be open or locked, to allow (or prevent) people from joining other characters in that virtual space. Programmers on the MOO could create "virtual objects" that had the ability to move characters from room to room, such as virtual cars, a magical tour globe that provided a guided tour of English-related rooms in the environment (programmed by one of Diversity University's "wizards," Ulf Kastner), and a Points of Interest Board that served as a kind of portal to every site listed on the board, among others. Many of these features have been incorporated into newer, three-dimensional versions of Multi-User Virtual Environments, such as Second Life.

== Sample educational projects ==
Josh Quittner's March 1994 article about Diversity University described one of the first uses of DU as a space to hold actual university classes. In spring 1994, Leslie Harris (then an assistant professor at Susquehanna University) and Cynthia Wambeam (working as a composition instructor at the University of Wyoming) paired their English composition classes and held inter-class discussions of shared readings in Diversity University. Because the MOO environment was text-based, it offered students practice in articulating ideas in writing, which was reinforced in an inter-class LISTSERV. Harris and Wambeam discussed their experience and its effect on student writing skills in an article in Computers and Composition.

Because the MOO created a virtual world by describing its environment, it provided an excellent space for reenactments of literary texts, in which visitors can be "immersed" in the world of the novel or fictional work. One such project was a recreation of Dante's Inferno (the first book of Dante's Divine Comedy), also by students in courses taught by Leslie Harris. Students recreated some of the circles of Hell within the MOO, populated with virtual robots that could interact with one another and with visitors to the site. Since the rooms were interconnected, visitors could go down from level to level, experiencing parts of Dante and Virgil's journey. The fifth circle of hell was depicted virtually by students in Professor Harris' course.

Two similar projects on Diversity University were an interactive version of The Waste Land by T. S. Eliot, with rooms in the MOO world reflecting sections of Eliot's poem, and a "MOO Bedford" created by R. J. LaRoe that allowed visitors to the MOO to explore the world of Moby-Dick. Many English-related educational projects existed on the MOO.

Educators in other fields brought students to Diversity University, taking advantage of the close fit between Constructivist teaching methods and the MOO environment. For example, Professor Tom Danford of West Virginia Northern Community College taught a microbiology course in the MOO. As Dick Banks explains, "The constructivist assignments [in Professor Danford's microbiology course] include a student microscope slide set, an instructional object of some sort, and participation in a group project. The group projects are separate rooms, each devoted to a specific disease or pathogen. Students were divided into three member groups and the disease/organism was assigned in the beginning of the semester. At the end of the term, each group will present its room and contents to the class."

When you visit a room in a MOO, you see its description as you enter and you can create virtual objects in a room that themselves can be described. In a room that is supposed to represent a bacterium or other pathogen, students need to describe the features of the room in very specific detail, so that the room is scientifically accurate. The students are thus learning in a creative way the structure of the organism they are studying, while indirectly teaching that structure to anyone who visits the room and more directly to their fellow students in the course.

A team run by Marcus Speh ran a course on "Object-oriented programming using C++". This course had about 80 registrants and ran over about 8 weeks. Its value was recognised by a "Best of the Web" award in WWW1 in 1994

Another notable project on DU was the Librarians' Online Support Team (LOST), led by Isabel Danforth, which held professional development workshops within the MOO environment for librarians who were trying to understand the growing significance of the Internet to librarianship. In an announcement for one of those workshops, Danforth explained the purpose of the group and the significance of Diversity University as a platform for such collaborations:

The Librarian's On-Line Support Team (L.O.S.T.) is an organization that is coordinated by a steering committee consisting of academic, research, public, and K-12 librarians from wide-spread locations. The group provides space for librarians, many of whom are being thrust into cyberspace with minimal training and support, to get both formal and informal instruction and mentoring. Librarians with various levels of background can meet to share ideas and experiences informally. The group is currently based at the virtual campus of Diversity University, a cyberspace location that offers both real-time and delayed interaction via computer and currently supports over 4,000 educators and students world-wide. Information about L.O.S.T. and its programs can be found at: https://web.archive.org/web/20080511023627/http://admin.gnacademy.org:8001/~lost/

LOST epitomized Diversity University's ability to foster collaboration among educators, which was one of McWhorter's original purposes in creating the environment. Other initiatives included an online biology conference held simultaneously on Diversity University MOO and BioMOO, and a bilingual recreation of El Paso and Ciudad Juárez within the MOO environment, demonstrating the usefulness of the environment for foreign language education. Realizing the special importance of the immersive experience of visiting a MOO, foreign-language educators created other MOO spaces entirely in those target languages.

== Educational tools in the MOO ==
Because faculty members at universities were holding class sessions on DU MOO, the MOO wizards developed objects that provided some typical classroom capabilities. For example, faculty members on the MOO could use a "Generic Slide Projector" to "project" a series of text "slides" to everyone in the room, which allowed faculty members to give "pre-recorded" instructions to students, without having to type those instructions on the spot. An object called a $note (basically, a kind of text file) could be created to work like a blackboard. When students entered a room (for example, a separate room for small-group discussions), students could "read" the blackboard, which would give them questions to discuss or instructions on what to do during the class time. If faculty members wanted to record the discussions that took place in a room, they could use a "Generic Recording Device" to create a transcript of the session, for later review.

Although similar tools have now been incorporated into learning management systems, Multi-User Virtual Environments, and other programs for online conferencing, some of those tools were subject to the criticisms leveled by Tari Fanderclai, who asserted that faculty using new pedagogical environments like a MOO should adapt their teaching techniques to take advantage of the special possibilities of the MOO, rather than trying to make a MOO more like a traditional classroom.

The online teaching tools did help faculty members conduct their classes in the decentralized and potentially chaotic MOO world, and they reveal as well the power and flexibility of the object-oriented programming environment. Faculty members did not need to possess programming skills to create objects in the MOO world that performed significant functions. If they wanted an object on which they could write notes, comparable to a course blackboard, they could create an object of that class, which would inherit all the features of the parent object. If they wanted a Generic Recording Device to record the student discussions that went on in the room, they could issue a relatively simple command (for example, @create #2978 named MyRecorder), which would create for them an object with those desired features. Faculty pioneers using the MOO could create lists of MOO help sheets — for example, MOO Help and Policy Texts, and the Composition in Cyberspace Project — making it easier for other faculty to use the environment. That cooperative spirit of users helping one another out — the recognition that "everyone was once a newbie [that is, a new user of the technology]" — informed Diversity University MOO. Its shared, collaborative, highly social environment made it an early example (along with other MOOs) of a Social network service, with a kind of network effect that resembled later Web 2.0 environments.

== Closing ==
Diversity University shut down in 2006. Its domain name, du.org, was allowed to expire on October 26, 2006.
