= MorgenGrauen =

- Developer: Project community
- Engine: LDMud
- Platform: Platform independent
- Release: 1992
- Genre: Fantasy MUD
- Mode: Multiplayer

MorgenGrauen, abbreviated MG, is a German-language MUD, a text-based online role-playing game, founded in 1992 and opened to the public in 1993. It is noted as popular in the MUD world, described at times as having an average of around 100 players online per day, with some days seeing 220 players. It bills itself, and has been noted by others, as the world's largest German-speaking MUD.

Its name means "Dawn", or specifically and literally "morning-gray", the dawn twilight.

== Game characteristics ==
A screenshot of MorgenGrauen's login sequence

MorgenGrauen takes place in a medieval fantasy setting. Players may choose between the human, elf, dwarf, hobbit, goblin, dark elf and feline races for their characters. "Guilds" are found rather than character classes; fantasy RPG staples such as the Fighter, Magician, and Cleric are present, but also such distinctive flourishes as the Karate, Chaos, and Beer Shaker guilds, in total 10.

The MUD allows new users to log in as a guest character, but guests are often ignored and cannot solve quests or do reasonable fighting.

MorgenGrauen has introduced a distinctive level system in May 1996, where the normal fighting experience points became only a small part of a player character's total level. Since then, PCs get additional level points for solving official and mini-quests, exploring areas, killing strong monsters the first time, guild skills and magic potions. For each 100 level points PCs may advance one level; the current maximum is about level 160. As an example, a high-level player may have about 5% of his points from fighting experience, about 5% from magic potions, 5% from guild skills, 30% from quest points, 20% from first-kill points and 35% from exploring. To prevent making exploring point locations known the level points lacking to the next advance are displayed only as approximate value.

There are 80 magic potions to be found, which permanently increase your stats, composed of intelligence, stamina, strength and dexterity. The locations of these potions vary for different players, there are some hundred hides for them, but you can get hints from the oracle to find them.

Death has no important role in MorgenGrauen, you get a stat reduction and reduced attacks for some time, and lose some fighting experience points, but lose no important attributes like fighting and spellcasting skills, stats or other level points. So you may meet death more often than in other MUDs, but with lesser consequences. Restoring your life and concentration (aka magic) points is done mainly by consuming drinks and food in inns.

Player killing is prohibited. Player may unite in teams to fight strong monsters or monster groups with the advantage of a coordinated start of the fight, a teamchannel and distribution of the first-kills to one of the players not yet having it.

MorgenGrauen has a special text-only mode without ascii pictures for blind people. It allows the use of scripts for running ways and fighting assistance, but not for solving quests and fully automated exploring.

== History ==
MorgenGrauen was founded by students at the University of Münster, and was hosted on a university server until funds were obtained to purchase a server hosted in Berlin. Currently MorgenGrauen has its home at NetCologne, Köln.

== Publications ==
MG makes its mudlib, the MorgenGrauen Mudlib, publicly available.

== Technical infrastructure ==
MorgenGrauen is an LPMud running on the LDMud game driver and, naturally, the MorgenGrauen Mudlib.
