= Cat Rambo =

Science fiction writer and editor from the United States

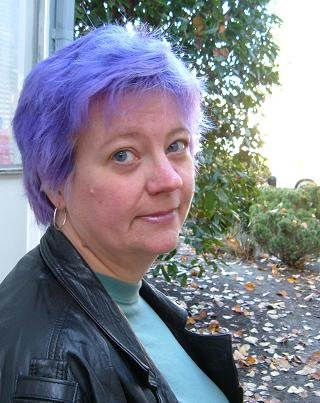
- Cat Rambo
- Born: November 14, 1963 (age 62); Bryan, Texas, U.S.
- Education: Johns Hopkins Writing Seminars; Clarion West Writers Workshop
- Occupations: Writer, editor
- Writing career
- Language: English
- Genres: Science fiction, fantasy
- Notable works: Beasts of Tabat (2015) "Carpe Glitter" (2019); You Sexy Thing (2021)
- Notable awards: Nebula–Novelette (2020)
- Website: kittywumpus.net

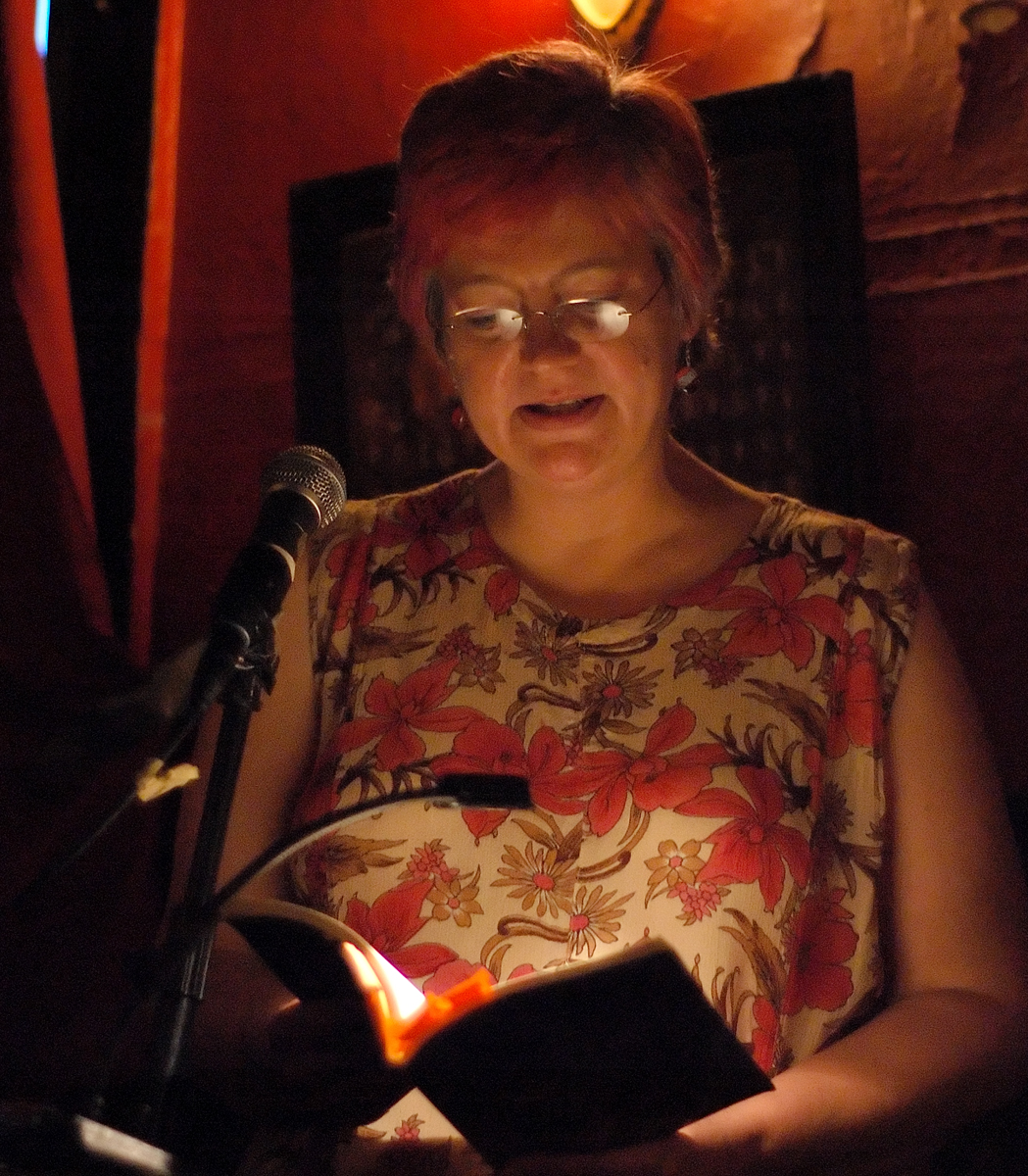
Rambo reading at the KGB bar in 2009

Cat Rambo (born November 14, 1963) is an American science fiction and fantasy writer and editor. Rambo uses they/them pronouns. Rambo is winner of the Nebula Award for Best Novelette for "Carpe Glitter". They were co-editor of Fantasy Magazine from 2007 to 2011, which earned them a 2012 World Fantasy Special Award—Non-professional nomination.

== Career ==
A graduate of the Johns Hopkins Writing Seminars and Clarion West Writers Workshop, Rambo writes predominantly fantasy and science fiction. Their short stories have appeared in such places as Asimov's Science Fiction, Clarkesworld Magazine and Tor.com since the release of "Grandmother's Road Trip" in Chizine #26 in 2005. Some of their short stories have received recognition; in 2012, their story "Five Ways to Fall in Love on Planet Porcelain", initially published in Near / Far: Stories of the Near Future and the Far (2012), was shortlisted for a Nebula Award for Best Short Story. "Carpe Glitter" was subsequently awarded the Nebula Award for Best Novelette. They later made longer works; their first novel, Beasts of Tabat, was published by Wordfire Press in 2015 and is the first of a fantasy quartet. It was shortlisted for the Compton Crook Award.

Rambo collaborated with Jeff VanderMeer on The Surgeon's Tale and Other Stories, published in 2007. They collaborated in a new weird round-robin writing project for editors by Ann VanderMeer and Jeff VanderMeer, published in the 2008 anthology The New Weird ("Festival Lives", pp. 365). They were the co-editor with Fran Wilde of Ad Astra: The SFWA 50th Anniversary Cookbook (2015).

In 2008, they donated their archive to the department of Rare Books and Special Collections at Northern Illinois University.

They also work with Armageddon, a fantasy MUD, under the name Sanvean, and write gaming articles. Their background in technology writing includes work for Microsoft and Security Dynamics.

They are a member of the Codex Writers Group and, in 2008, was appointed chair of the Copyright Committee of the Science Fiction and Fantasy Writers of America (SFWA). Rambo served two two-year terms as President of the SFWA from 2015 through 2019 following one year as Vice President. Rambo was the Writer Guest of Honor at Norwescon 44 in April 2022.

== Awards ==
Ref:

=== Literary awards ===
| Year | Work | Award | | Result | Ref |
|---|---|---|---|---|---|
| 2008 | "The Surgeon's Tale" | Locus Award | Novelette | Nominated—21st | |
| 2010 | Eyes Like Sky and Coal and Moonlight | Endeavour Award | — | Shortlisted | |
| 2010 | "Narrative of a Beast's Life" | Locus Award | Short Story | Nominated—8th | |
| 2011 | "Clockwork Fairies" | Locus Award | Short Story | Nominated—23rd | |
| 2013 | "Five Ways to Fall in Love on Planet Porcelain" | Nebula Award | Short Story | Shortlisted | |
| 2016 | Beasts of Tabat | Compton Crook Award | — | Shortlisted | |
| 2017 | "Left Behind" | Locus Award | Short Story | Nominated—39th | |
| 2020 | "Carpe Glitter" | Nebula Award | Novelette | Won | |
| 2022 | "Crazy Beautiful" | Locus Award | Short Story | Nominated—8th | |
| 2022 | You Sexy Thing | Dragon Award | Science Fiction Novel | Shortlisted | |
| 2022 | You Sexy Thing | Locus Award | Science Fiction Novel | Nominated—10th | |

=== As magazine editor ===
| Year | Work | Award | | Result | Ref |
|---|---|---|---|---|---|
| 2009 | Fantasy Magazine | Locus Award | Magazine | Nominated—19th | |
| 2010 | Fantasy Magazine | Locus Award | Magazine | Nominated—14th | |
| 2011 | Fantasy Magazine | Locus Award | Magazine | Nominated—12th | |
| 2012 | Fantasy Magazine | World Fantasy Award | Special Award—Non-professional | Shortlisted | |

== Bibliography ==
=== Novels ===
==== Disco Space Opera ====
- —— (2021). You Sexy Thing (hardcover 1st ed.). Tor Books. pp. 1–304. ISBN 9781250269300.
- —— (2022). Devil's Gun (hardcover 1st ed.). Tor Books. pp. 1–272. ISBN 9781250269355.
- —— (2024). Rumor Has It (hardcover 1st ed.). Tor Books. pp. 1–256. ISBN 9781250269393.

==== Tabat Quartet ====
- —— (2015). Beasts of Tabat (paperback ed.). Colorado Springs: WordFire Press. pp. 1–326. ISBN 9781614752974.
- —— (2018). Hearts of Tabat. Colorado Springs: WordFire Press. pp. 1–428. ISBN 9781614756378.
- —— (2021). Exiles of Tabat (hardcover ed.). Colorado Springs: WordFire Press. ISBN 9781680571844.
- —— (2022). Gods of Tabat. WordFire Press.

=== Novellas ===
- ——; Turtledove, Harry; Morrow, James K. (2020). And the Last Trump Shall Sound (paperback ed.). CAEZIK SF & Fantasy. pp. 1–210. ISBN 9781647100056.

=== Chapbook form ===
- —— (2011). Clockwork Fairies (ebook ed.). Tor Books. pp. 1–32. ISBN 9781429927567.
- —— (2019). Carpe Glitter (paperback 1st ed.). Meerkat Press. pp. 1–62. ISBN 9781946154538.

=== Collections ===
- —— & VanderMeer, Jeff (2007). The Surgeon's Tale and Other Stories. Prime. pp. 1–100. ISBN 9780809572687.
- —— (2009). Eyes Like Sky and Coal and Moonlight (paperback 1st ed.). Paper Golem Press. pp. 1–175. ISBN 9780979534959.
- —— (2012). Near + Far (paperback ed.). Seattle: Hydra House. pp. 1–318. ISBN 9780984830145.
- —— (2016). Altered America: Steampunk Stories (kindle ed.). pp. 1–168.
- —— (2016). Neither Here Nor There (hardcover 1st ed.). Hydra House. ISBN 9780989082884.

=== Short fiction ===
- "The Surgeon's Tale"" (short story with Jeff VanderMeer), Subterranean Magazine, Winter 2007
- "I'll Gnaw Your Bones, the Manticore Said" (short story), Clarkesworld, July 2007
- "Foam on the Water" (short story), Strange Horizons, February 2007
- "Worm Within" (short story), Clarkesworld Magazine, September 2008
- —— (2008). "The Bumblety's Marble". In Ekaterina Sedia (ed.). Paper Cities: An Anthology of Urban Fantasy.
- —— (2011). Clockwork Fairies. Tor.com. ISBN 9781429927567.
- —— (2013). "A Man and His Parasite". In Sophie Yorkston (ed.). SQ Mag, Edition 8.
- —— (March 2014). "All the Pretty Little Mermaids". Asimov's Science Fiction. 38 (3): 66–70.
- —— (April 2014). "Bud Webster". In Conversation. Analog. 134 (4): 44–45.
