= TorilMUD =

- Developer(s): Kris Kortright, project community
- Engine: Sequent
- Platform(s): Platform independent
- Release: 1996
- Genre(s): Dungeons & Dragons MUD
- Mode(s): Multiplayer

TorilMUD is a MUD, a text-based online role-playing game, and is one of the oldest and largest of its kind.

== Game characteristics ==
A screenshot of the login sequence from TorilMUD.

TorilMUD is set in the Forgotten Realms Dungeons & Dragons campaign setting. Toril is the name of the planet where the continent Faerûn, which "Forgotten Realms" refers to, is located. Its technical infrastructure is based on the Sequent derivative of the DikuMUD codebase.

== History ==
Kris Kortright, a developer from the MUD Black Knights Realm, founded Sojourn, set in the Forgotten Realms campaign setting for the Dungeons & Dragons role-playing game, in 1993, along with Tim Devlin and John Bashaw. Sojourn was based on the Sequent codebase, the Epic spell system, and areas from Black Knights Realm. The City of Waterdeep was the first zone built entirely for Sojourn. Brad McQuaid was an avid player of Sojourn. Seeing the commercial potential of virtual worlds in the course of his MUD career, he went on to create EverQuest. With Kris' permission, he used it as the model for the city of Freeport in EverQuest. In 1996, due to creative differences between developers, Sojourn was forked into two projects, TorilMUD and Duris: Land of Bloodlust.

The developers had also previously worked on Copper II, Copper III and Black Knights Realm. The oldest zone on TorilMUD, the Lava Tubes, comes from Copper II, and the Underworld and Alterian Wilderness zones are from Black Knights Realm.

Sojourn was based on the Sequent codebase, the Epic spell system, and areas from Black Knights Realm. The City of Waterdeep was the first zone built entirely for Sojourn, and remains TorilMUD's most heavily populated hometown.

Sojourn continued until 1996, when a difference in creative vision among the staff led to the project being forked into TorilMUD and Duris: Land of Bloodlust. Of the two, TorilMUD is regarded as the more direct inheritor of Sojourn's legacy. Toril continued until 1998, when it became Sojourn 2, and underwent another rebirth in 2001 as Sojourn 3. Kris retired in 2003, and Sojourn 3 was reborn as TorilMUD, or as the old-time players refer to it, Toril 2. Throughout these rebirths, the areas and code continued to grow: there are currently 300 zones (with several more nearing completion), 16277 types of monsters/mobs, and 13753 different items.

Many TorilMUD staff members were staff on Sojourn 3, Sojourn 2, and some are even from Toril 1, providing a degree of continuity. All Toril staff started as players on the MUD, giving them a great deal of personal experience with the game.

Brad McQuaid was an avid player of Sojourn and, after its demise, TorilMUD. Seeing the commercial potential of virtual worlds in the course of his MUD career, he went on to create EverQuest.

== Reception and impact ==
An Engadget article from 2011 noted TorilMUD for its direct influence on the MMO industry.
