= MU* =

Family of virtual world servers

MU* is an abbreviation which refers collectively to a family of text-based multi-user virtual world servers comprising:

- TinyMUD
- MUSH
- MOO
- TinyMUCK
- and related, less-notable types; see the TinyMUD family tree for more

Another term for these servers is the Tiny family.

The asterisk is often used in computer programming languages to represent a wildcard (any number of arbitrary characters), which suggests a usage that encompasses MUDs in general. However, confusingly, MU* is often used in a manner exclusive of services specifically described as MUDs, with the MU* term meant to distance the TinyMUD family of "social MUDs" from "combat-oriented" MUDs. With the dominant usage of MUD being as a generic term rather than specifically denoting combat-oriented games — indeed, both TinyMUD and MOO are MUDs in name (MOO stands for MUD, Object-Oriented), while MUSH and MUCK are backronymed puns on "MUD" — this positions MU* as actually being a subset of MUD.
