= Win rate =

In advertising, a win rate is a percentage metric in programmatic media marketing that measures the number of impressions won over the number of impressions bid. Win rates are used to gauge competition in programmatic buys in a second-payer Vickrey auction. High win rates indicate either low competition, aggressive bids in comparison to competitors, or selective inventory.

== Impacting Win Rates ==
Win rates can vary based on Demand-side platform, as each can generate different numbers in the numerator and the denominator based on how many queries per second the technology can handle and filters out before the auction.

Actions to take that are likely to increase the win rate:

- Increase bids to win more impressions and increase the numerator.
- Bid in fewer auctions to decrease the denominator.
- Use a pre-bid solution to be more selective in impressions that are bid on.
- Blacklisting or whitelisting select inventory *may* decrease the denominator.
- Reducing frequency caps causes fewer bids on the number of impressions and reduces the denominator.

Increasing the numerator will increase Win Rate = Number of Impressions Won/Number of Impressions Bid
