= Actua (Canadian charity) =

Nonprofit organization in Canada

Actua is a Canadian charitable organization that delivers science, engineering and technology educational programs to young people in Canada.

The organization is a member of the Science and Technology Awareness Network (S.T.A.N.). Actua's president and CEO is Jennifer E. Flanagan.

== Organization ==
=== Programs ===
Actua's programs use hands-on activities in fields such as health, mining, biology and ecology. The majority of member organizations also travel outside the urban centers where they are located to deliver camps and workshops in rural and remote communities.

The programs include:

- National Mentorship Program
- National Aboriginal Outreach Program
- National Girls Program
- Go Where Kids Are Program

In July 2021, Actua was awarded a $50,000 grant to develop "vaccine safety content" targeted towards students and teachers to combat vaccine hesitancy. The funding was administered jointly by the Canadian Institutes of Health Research, Natural Sciences and Engineering Research Council and Social Sciences and Humanities Research Council through the "Encouraging vaccine confidence in Canada" COVID-19 vaccine funding program.

=== Membership ===
Actua operates on a membership structure, consisting of member organizations located at 31 university and college institutions across Canada. Actua's member programs are delivered by undergraduate and high school students through science camps and workshops, which are customized to the needs of local communities.

The program has 34 members throughout the various provinces and territories of Canada.

==== Alberta ====
- Lethbridge: Destination Exploration at the University of Lethbridge
- Calgary: Minds in Motion at the University of Calgary
- Red Deer: Science Promotion at Red Deer College

==== British Columbia ====
- Kamloops: EUReKA! Science Program at Thompson Rivers University
- Vancouver: GEERing Up! at the University of British Columbia
- Burnaby: Science AL!VE at Simon Fraser University
- Victoria: Science Venture at the University of Victoria

==== Manitoba ====
- Brandon: Mini University at Brandon University
- Winnipeg: Eco-Kids at the University of Winnipeg and WISE Kid-Netic Energy at the University of Manitoba

==== New Brunswick ====
- Fredericton: Worlds UNBound at the University of New Brunswick

==== Nova Scotia ====
- Halifax: SuperNOVA at Dalhousie University
- Antigonish: X-Chem Outreach Program at St. Francis Xavier University

==== Nunavut ====
- Iqaluit: Simply Science at the Nunavut Research Institute

==== Ontario ====
- Ottawa: Adventures in Engineering and Science at the University of Ottawa and Virtual Ventures at Carleton University
- Guelph: Creative Encounters at the University of Guelph
- London: Discovery Western at the University of Western Ontario
- Toronto: Engineering Outreach at the University of Toronto and Science Explorations at York University
- Waterloo: ESQ at the University of Waterloo
- Kingston: ASUS Camps at Queen's University
- Thunder Bay: Superior Science at Lakehead University
- Hamilton: Venture Engineering and Science at McMaster University
- Brantford: SNP STEAM Academy at Six Nations Polytechnic

==== Quebec ====
- Montreal: Folie Technique at École Polytechnique de Montréal
- Trois-Rivières: Génitrucs at Université du Québec à Trois-Rivières
- Laval: Musée Armand Frappier at Centre d'interprétation des Biosciences

==== Saskatchewan ====
- Regina: EYES (Educating Youth in Engineering & Science) at the University of Regina and FNU Health and Science Camp at First Nations University of Canada
- Saskatoon: SCI-FI Science Camps at the University of Saskatchewan

==== Yukon ====
- Whitehorse: Science Adventures at Yukon College

== Awards ==
In 2000, Actua was awarded the Michael Smith Award by the National Science and Engineering Research Council.

In 2000, Actua submitted its programs to an independent evaluation process to measure their programs' effectiveness. The three-year research initiative surveyed student participants who revealed their experience with Actua programs.

In 2009, the Ontario Trillium Foundation named Actua and its 11 Ontario members the winner of the Minister's Award recognizing not-for-profit organizations that have had "an exceptional impact in their communities."
