= TinyMUCK =

Type of online text-based role-playing game

TinyMUCK or, more broadly, a MUCK, is a type of user-extendable online text-based role-playing game, designed for role playing and social interaction. Backronyms like "Multi-User Chat/Created/Computer/Character/Carnal Kingdom" and "Multi-User Construction Kit" are sometimes cited, but are not the actual origin of the term; "muck" is simply a play on the term MUD.

== History ==
- The original TinyMUCK 1.0 server was written by Stephen White from University of Waterloo in winter of 1990, based on TinyMUD 1.5.2 codebase. This version improved building capabilities for the users.
- TinyMUCK 2.0 was released in June 1990 by Piaw "Lachesis" Na from Berkeley, who added the programming language MUF for in-game server extensions.
- TinyMUCK 2.1 and 2.2 were released in July 1990 and April 1991 by Robert "ChupChup" Earl of San Diego, California. These were mostly bugfix releases as the code was cleaned up and ported to new operating systems and architectures.
- FuzzBall MUCK server was built on TinyMUCK 2.2 codebase by Belfry Webworks and, as of version 5, released in 1995, includes the alternative programming language MPI. version 6, available at SourceForge project fbmuck also supports MCP and MCP-GUI.

== Characteristics ==
MUCKs are extensible by design, players can create and modify ("build") all internal objects of the game environment, including rooms, exits, and even the system commands, for which the MUCKs use the MUF (Multi-User Forth) language. Fuzzball MUCKs also use Message Parsing Interpreter (MPI) which can be used to embed executable code into descriptions of all in-game objects. Unlike many other virtual worlds, however, TinyMUCK and its descendants do not usually have computer-controlled monsters for players to kill.

== Usage ==
TinyMUCKs are popular among members of furry fandom; examples of active, large TinyMUCKs include FurryMUCK and Tapestries MUCK, both of which run the Fuzzball version of MUCK server code.

== See also ==
- MUD
- MUSH
- MOO
- Online text-based role-playing game
