= Iron Realms Entertainment =

American computer game company

- Type: Limited liability
- Industry: Video games
- Founded: 1996
- Founder: Matt Mihaly
- Headquarters: United States
- Key people: Jeremy Saunders
- Website: www.ironrealms.com

Iron Realms Entertainment (formerly known as Achaea LLC) is a computer game development company that has created the MUDs Achaea, Dreams of Divine Lands; Aetolia, The Midnight Age; Imperian, the Sundered Heavens; Lusternia, Age of Ascension; and Midkemia Online. Matt Mihaly is its founder and CEO and Jeremy Saunders is its president.

== Games ==
Games developed by Iron Realms Entertainment include:

- Achaea, Dreams of Divine Lands, a high fantasy text-based MUD operating continuously since 1997.
- Aetolia, The Midnight Age, a roleplay-intensive text-based MUD set in a Gothic fantasy world with numerous player-run political organizations.
- Imperian, the Sundered Heavens, a fantasy MUD set in a world ravaged by natural catastrophe.
- Lusternia, a text-based MUD game set in a fantasy sword and sorcery world revolving around four city-states and two nature communes.
- Midkemia Online, a text-based MUD game based on author Raymond E. Feist's Midkemia universe. It was shut down in 2015, partially due to the cost of maintaining the license.
- Starmourn, a science-fiction MUD announced by Iron Realms came out in 2017.

== Rapture Engine ==
The Rapture Engine was created by Iron Realms Entertainment and is used by all of its MUDs, albeit heavily modified for those most recently in production.

Rapture was used to develop an interactive chat system in conjunction with a United Nations affiliated organization for the 7th Annual World Summit of Young Entrepreneurs.

== History ==
Iron Realms Entertainment LLC was founded as Achaea LLC in 1996. After the release of Aetolia in 2001, Achaea LLC was renamed Iron Realms LLC.

In 2004, IRE was featured in Computer Gaming World and on Wired News after the release of an "addictive" virtual drug called gleam.

Achaea was featured in the June 10, 2004 episode of The Screen Savers.
