= Achaea, Dreams of Divine Lands =

1997 video game

- Developer: Iron Realms Entertainment
- Publisher: Iron Realms Entertainment
- Engine: Rapture Runtime Environment
- Platform: Platform independent
- Release: 1997
- Genre: Fantasy MUD
- Mode: Multiplayer

Achaea, Dreams of Divine Lands is a roleplay-focused, text-based multi-user dungeon (MUD) released on September 9, 1997. It was published by Achaea LLC, now known as Iron Realms Entertainment. Achaea is operated by collecting the revenue through a microtransaction system, which allows payment for the acquisition of in-game benefits.

== Gameplay ==
In the game, players explore a fantasy sword and sorcery world revolving around six city-states and their respective Houses. As in most role-playing games, players can fight monsters for experience points and treasure, perform quests for non-player characters and interact with other players. One of the major forms of interaction is player vs. player combat, where the dynamic conflict, especially the conflict between Good and Evil plays a dominant role in Achaea. The other play mechanics include the free market economics, which allows the players to design and craft goods, and the player-run social structure, including Houses (formerly guilds) and politics.

The world consists of over twenty thousand locations, known as rooms, ranging from common countryside to more exotic and surreal environments. Players may choose among eighteen classes, ranging from familiar fantasy elements such as paladins to more unusual options such as Tarot-using Occultists.

Recent structural changes have enriched the environment of Achaea further, by opening up the seas to player controlled ships. This has made available many minigames including diving for treasure, deep-sea fishing and even a form of piracy.

== Revenue ==
Achaea is one of the first known examples of a game with microtransactions. It had been initially launched when Internet service plans were time-limited, effectively gating access to MUDs so that their cost of operations were low. However, when America On-Line offered flat-rate plans, this removed that gate, and many MUDs like Achaea became unprofitable since players could spend much more time on them. Achaea's creator Matt Mihaly came up with the idea of a dual currency system to generate revenue to cover the higher operating costs; while one in-game currency remained free, the other premium currency could only be purchased with real-world funds, and many special items could only be purchased with the premium currency.

Achaea's controversial revenue structure has received attention from the game development industry. Although Iron Realms Entertainment provides a custom MUD interface for the game, there are neither up-front costs, nor monthly fees typical for the MMORPG-genre. Instead, players may spend money for credits that are then used in-game to acquire skills and superior equipment.

Recently, however, Achaea has somewhat deviated from this model. In early 2010, the option to purchase an Iron Elite membership became available, which periodically gives players credits and other bonuses in exchange for a monthly fee.

The International Game Developers Association (IGDA) has noted that Achaea has been successful in this "revenue from object sales" model, "report[ing] substantially higher average revenue per customer ... than the usual subscription prices.". Achaea's use of this model was compared to higher-profile releases such as Magic: The Gathering Online and Project Entropia and has been highlighted by game developer Daniel James and researcher Richard Bartle as a possible solution for the problems other online games face involving commodification and interaction with real economy.

== Reviews and reactions ==
Achaea has received generally positive reviews for both its mechanics and social complexities, including a review from Leo Laporte on the June 10, 2004 episode of The Screen Savers on TechTV that was reported as favourable.

The combat system includes "hundreds of different ways to attack an opponent", leading to a "complex array of strategies" that is a "true test of skill". The game's engine was adapted for use as the medium of an "e-summit" staged at the 7th Annual World Summit of Young Entrepreneurs with the United Nations.

The role-playing and social aspects of the game have also led to Achaea being cited as an example of "political game design". That political system, along with the game's dynamic events and "player narrative" are remarked on in Designing Virtual Worlds, Bartle's examination of the history of multiplayer online games. Iron Realms Entertainment quotes id Software founder John Romero as saying he "doesn't believe there is a deeper game in existence".

== Controversy ==
Nevertheless, some aspects of the game have met with criticism. The game's revenue system, in particular, has faced mixed opinions. Players playing for free "won't be able to advance as much as the person who has the funds" without a considerable time investment, which often sparks controversy between free players and those who paid for in-game bonuses that can cost as much as 2500 credits, the equivalent of $725 per item. The IGDA acknowledges that the system requires "delicate issues of design balance".

The 2004 introduction of gleam, an in-game addictive drug, created controversy, angering some players and reviewers who felt it sent an inappropriate message about the consequences of real-world drug use.
