= The Hamnet Players =

Virtual theatre group

The Hamnet Players is a virtual theater group, founded in 1993 by Stuart Harris, an English writer living in San Diego, California. There have been six Hamnet Players productions, beginning in 1993 with a virtual theatre performance using Internet Relay Chat (IRC), based on William Shakespeare's Hamlet. The show "Hamnet" is cited as the first-ever experiment with virtual theater.

== History ==
=== Hamnet ===
The Hamnet Players were founded in 1993 by Stuart Harris, an English actor, computer consultant, and expert on IRC living in San Diego, California.

On December 12, 1993, the Players debuted the concept of internet theater with their production of "Hamnet," an 80-line parody of William Shakespeare's Hamlet performed via Internet Relay Chat. The group takes its name from this production.

Harris created a designated chat channel on IRC named #hamnet, where actors and spectators could meet, with casting carried out on the day of the performance. The show had a cast of 19 and a crew of 4. The script includes reactions performed by a character called 'Audience.' Since the show took place on an IRC channel, users were anonymous and could interact in any way they wished. The creative team did not take action to counter this. The play was performed a second time three months later on 6 February 1994, featuring the Royal Shakespeare Company's Ian Taylor as the principal character. During that production, a bot killed Hamlet in the middle of the show. The cast of Players changes from one performance to another.

=== Further productions ===
On 23 April 1994, The Hamnet Players premiered their second production called "PCbeth: an IBM clone of Macbeth", a 160-line parody of the Shakespeare play Macbeth, with 21 cast and crew members based across the world. It was re-staged on 10 July 1994, as a festival production.

In February 1995, the plot of Tennessee Williams' play A Streetcar Named Desire was used to create their third original piece, "An IRC Channel Named #desire." As with other theatrical productions, the shows happened in real-time. It was performed twice, once on 30 October 1994, and again on 12 February 1995. The performances consisted of 28 cast and crew members.

== Performance and language ==
Every performance by The Hamnet Players uses Internet Relay Chat (IRC) software and worldwide links. Each line of the full script is numbered in sequence. After casting, actors are given their lines and cues by email, and no rehearsal is allowed. This ensures that it is only the production team that knows how the performance will unfold when presented in IRC.

The scripts were adaptations that significantly changed the dialogue from the source texts. The Hamnet Players replaced the archaic and literary language of William Shakespeare with colloquial Anglo-American English and internet slang. The shows were short, simplified versions of the original shows. "Hamnet" is only 80 lines long and there are only ten named characters, as opposed to the eighteen named in Shakespeare's original play.

Both the "Hamlet" and "Macbeth" parodies spoofed IRC, email, and other Internet conventions and practices. An example in "Hamnet" was the line:

<Hamlet> Oph: suggest u /JOIN #nunnery

Instead of "get thee to a nunnery," Hamlet tells Ophelia to join an IRC channel named #nunnery. The script cites the IRC command/join. Ordinarily, the slash is necessary to activate the command online; here, of course its only function is to make a joke.

The "PCbeth" script was mainly rewritten in IRC-ese and contemporary colloquial English. Only rarely did Gayle Kidder, the writer, use both original and modern language together, as in:

Is this a dagger I see before me? Crikes this castle’s spooky at night! [34]

In Scene 1 of "PCbeth," PCbeth and Banquo enter, "armored for KICK/BAN/DE-OP wars." Their wars are fought with three IRC commands: /kick removes a person temporarily from a channel; /ban prevents him or her from returning; and /de-op, a variant of the notion chanop or "channel operator," which is a person given certain privileges in managing a channel. To drop someone is to deprive them of these privileges.

The players often cited snippets from plays other than the one being performed. In the first performance of "Hamnet," the user Gazza announced that he would have to sign off, drive home from university, and then log on again. His execution of the sign-off command in IRC appeared on the screen as follows:

*** Signoff: Gazza (A horse, a horse, my kingdom for a horse….)

This is a reference to a well-known line in Richard III. Sometimes people would pretend to be characters from other Shakespeare plays. For instance, during preparations for "Hamnet," someone suddenly changed their nickname from <Spectator> to <MacBeth>. The move did not go unnoticed:

 <Recorder> Wrong play Spectator. ;-)

== Reception ==
In her paper "Curtain Time 20:00 GMT; Experiments with Virtual Theater on Internet Relay Chat", Brenda Danet says of "Hamnet" that the "...gross reduction of the length of the text and caricaturization of plot and action, along with transformation of hallowed Renaissance poetry into late 20th century colloquial prose and even lowly slang ... transform the play into a kind of typed Punch and Judy show".

Reviewing "Hamnet" in her thesis on internet performance, Mary Anglin wrote that: "The usual script-based format of IRC, and its use of dialogue as the primary communication method, present the facility as an ideal platform for performing text-based drama experimentally. The online potential for spontaneity and improvisation was both realised and cursed, however, when a bot unintentionally killed Hamlet halfway through the production."

== List of productions ==
- Hamnet, 1st production (12 December 1993)
- Hamnet, 2nd production (6 February 1994)
- PCBeth (an IBM clone of Macbeth), 1st production (23 April 1994)
- PCBeth (an IBM clone of Macbeth), 2nd production (10 July 1994)
- An IRC channel named #desire, 1st production (30 October 1994)
- An IRC channel named #desire, 2nd production (12 February 1995)

== See also ==
- Cyberformance
- Plaintext Players
- Antoinette LaFarge
