= North Wall Arts Centre =

Performing arts centre in Oxford, England

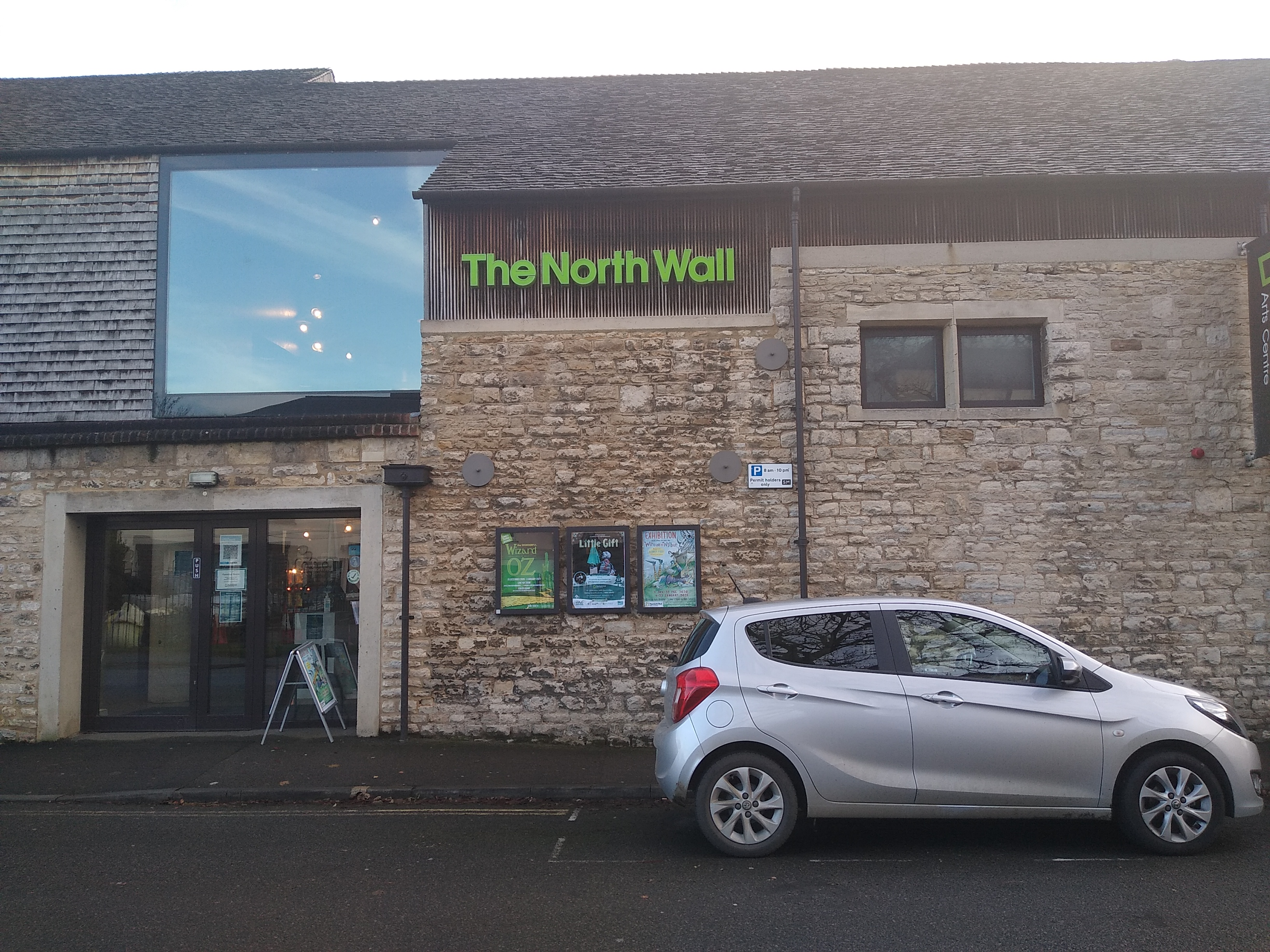
- Interactive map of North Wall Arts Centre
- Address: South Parade; OX2 7JN; Oxford; England
- Coordinates: 51.778°N 1.269°W
- Owner: St Edward's School
- Capacity: 200 (Theatre); 80 (Studio)
- Type: Performing arts centre

Construction
- Opened: 2007

Website
- www.thenorthwall.com

The North Wall Arts Centre (often just referred to as the North Wall) is a performing arts centre in Oxford, owned by St Edward's School and shared with the city. It houses a 200-seat theatre, plus a rehearsal space, dance studio and a visual art gallery. The arts centre hosts touring theatre companies, musicians and other public events, as well as events by the school, with the aim to provide facilities and arts events both for St Edward's students and for the public at large.

In 2017, John Hoggarth and Ria Parry were appointed as co-directors of the North Wall, replacing Lucy Maycock, who had been the Artistic Director since September 2010.

== History ==
The North Wall Arts Centre was built on the site of a Victorian swimming pool, which was the oldest swimming pool in the country, situated on the grounds of St Edward’s School. The name derives from an ancient stone boundary wall that runs the entire length of the public street elevation. Designed by Haworth Tompkins architects, the project cost more than £3.5 million and won several major architectural awards, including a RIBA in 2008. It also received a Certificate from the Oxford Preservation Trust in recognition of its "significant contribution to the conservation and improvement of Oxford’s built environment." Completed in 2006, The North Wall was officially opened to the public in 2007 with a three-week arts festival.

== Programs ==
In addition to hosting School events, The North Wall Arts Centre runs a regular programme of public arts events, as well as a Summer Festival in July and a residential drama school in August. It attracted various theatre companies including Birmingham Repertory Theatre, ATC Theatre, Out of Joint, Bush Theatre and Theatre Alibi. It has welcomed some musical acts, as French-Irish chanteuse Camille O'Sullivan, John Tavener, The Unthanks and Spiers and Boden. Comedians who have appeared at The North Wall include Eddie Izzard, Sarah Millican, John Bishop, Sindhu Vee and Rhod Gilbert. The theatre also hosts jazz evenings, ballets, children’s shows, contemporary and classical concerts, cabaret, opera, and new exhibitions in the modern gallery every three weeks.

== Plays performed ==
2007

- Great Expectations by Charles Dickens, St Edward's School, Oxford
- Noises Off by Michael Frayn
- Mr. Vertigo by Edward Kemp
- The Birthday Party by Harold Pinter
- A Midsummer Night's Dream by Shakespeare, St Edward's School, Oxford

2008

- The Tempest by Shakespeare, Tomahawk Theatre Company
- Good by Cecil Philip Taylor, St Edward's School, Oxford
- Hysteria, Inspector Sands, Stamping Ground Theatre
- Wit by Margaret Edson, Oxford Theatre Guild
- Zero by Chris O'Connell, Theatre Absolute
- Mile End by Dan Rebellato, Analogue
- Another Kind of Silence by Liz Rothschild, Full Circle Productions
- The Count of Monte Cristo by Alexandre Dumas and Joel Horwood, West Yorkshire Playhouse
- Shoot/Get Treasure/Repeat by Mark Ravenhill, Royal Court Theatre, Out of Joint, Paines Plough
- Infinite Lives by Chris Goode, The North Wall Arts Centre
- Cider With Rosie by Laurie Lee and Nick Darke, Bristol Old Vic Theatre School
- 50 Ways to Leave Your Lover, Bush Theatre
- Hedda Gabler by Henrik Ibsen, Tomahawk Theatre Company
- Our Country's Good directed by Lucy Maycock, Ralph Clark Theatre
- The Hothouse, directed by Simon Roche, Lush Theatre
- Two by Jim Cartwright, Hull Truck
- Measure for Measure by Shakespeare, Creation Theatre Company

2009

- Henry V by Shakespeare, St Edward's School, Oxford
- Dreams of Violence by Stella Feehily, Out of Joint, Soho Theatre
- John Moran...and his neighbour, Saori by John Moran, Saori Tsukada
- The American Pilot by David Greig, Oxford Theatre Guild
- Anima, North Wall Arts Centre
- Traces, The National Youth Theatre, Paines Plough
- Tess of the D'Urbervilles, adapted by Michael Fry, Bristol Old Vic Theatre School
- Gaslight by Patrick Hamilton, Tomahawk Theatre Company
- Paperweight, directed by Jamie Wood, Top of the World
- Lost in the Wind, Lost Spectacles
- Beef by John Godber, Hull Truck
- River's up by Alex Jones, Oxfordshire Touring Theatre
- Whiter Than Snow by Mike Kenny, Graeae Theatre Company
- Amadeus by Peter Shaffer, Oxford University
- Pandora 88, directed by Andrew Dawson, Fabrik Company
- The Importance of Being Earnest by Oscar Wilde, Tomahawk Theatre Company

2010

- Sweeney Todd: His Life, Times and Execution, directed by Alexander Parsonage, Finger in the Pie
- A View From the Bridge by Arthur Miller, Oxford Theatre Guild
- Ivan and the Dogs by Hattie Naylor, Soho Theatre
- John Moran and Saori (in Thailand) by John Moran, Saori Tsukada
- The Author by Tim Crouch, News from Nowhere
- Tiny Volcanoes by Laurence Wilson, Paines Plough
- My Name is Sue by Dafydd James, Notebook
- The Great British Country Fete by Russell Kane, Bush Theatre
- David Copperfield, Bristol Old Vic Theatre School
- Certain Dark Things, direct Emily Watson Howes, You need me
- Eurydice by Sarah Ruhl, Acting Touring Company
- Crush by Paul Charlton, Tristan Bates Theatre
- Cling To Me Like Ivy by Samantha Ellis, Birmingham Repertory Theatre
- The Colour of Nonsense directed by Andy Hay, Forkbeard Fantasy

2011

- A Christmas Carol by Charles Dickens, Creation Theatre Company
- Stalag Happy by Edward Elks and Dan Frost, Third Man Productions
- I, Malvolio by Tim Crouch
- A Delicate Balance by Edward Albee, Oxford Theatre Guild
- The Golden Dragon by Roland Schimmelpfennig, Drum Theatre Plymouth
- Bang Bang Bang by Stella Feehily, Octagon Theatre Bolton
- Bunny by Jack Thorne, Nabokov
- Epic by David Luff, Foster and Dechery
- The Big Smoke, Theatre Ad Infinitum
- Keepers directed by Simon Day, The Plasticine Men Director
- After the Accident by Julian Armistead, REM Projects
- Goucher's War by Nikki Sved, Theatre Alibi

2012

- The Government Inspector by Nikolai Gogol, Oxford Theatre Guild
- Yellow Moon by David Greig, Citizens Theatre
- The Odyssey, The Paper Cinema
- Rapunzel, Theatre of Widdershins
- The Barber of Seville, Opera Up Close
- Dead On Her Feet by Ron Hutchinson, director Barry Kyle
- Mad About the Boy, Iron Shoes Company
- So Comedy Night, with Tom Rosenthal
- Minsk 2011: A Reply to Kathy Acker, Belarus Free Theatre
- Mayday Mayday by director Katy Carmichael, Theatre Damfino
- Translunar Paradise by W. B. Yeats, Theatre Ad Infinitum
- Crave by Sarah Kane, Acting Touring Company
- DNA by Dennis Kelly, Hull Truck
- Snookered by Ishy Din Tamasha, Oldham and Bush Theatre

2021

- Bobby & Amy by Emily Jenkins, Emma Blackman Productions

== See also ==
- St Edward's School, Oxford
