= Helen Varley Jamieson =

Digital media artist, playwright and performer (born 1966)

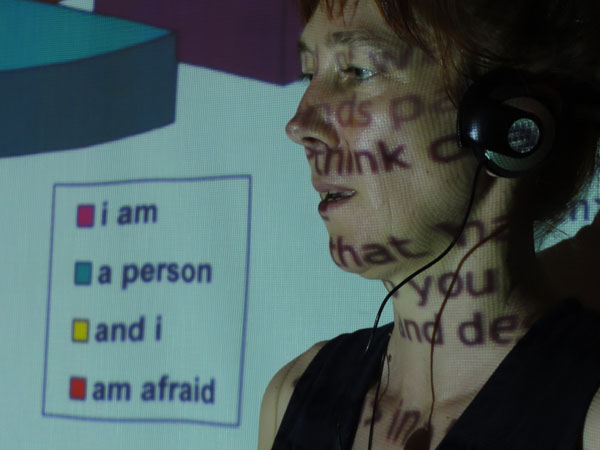
- Helen Varley Jamieson performing in "make-shift", Brisbane, Australia, February 2012
- Born: 1966 (age 59–60); Dunedin, New Zealand
- Education: Bachelor of Arts (English Literature and Theatre), University of Otago, 1992; Master of Arts (Research), Queensland University of Technology, 2008
- Known for: cyberformance, new media art, net art, digital art, theatre, writing

Helen Varley Jamieson is a digital media artist, playwright, performer, director and producer from New Zealand. She "is engaged in an ongoing exploration of the collision between theatre and the internet." Since 1997 she has been working on the internet professionally. In the year 2000 Helen Varley Jamieson coined the term cyberformance. This term is a combination of two words, cyberspace and performance. Jamieson states that "cyberformance can be located as a distinct form within the subsets of networked performance and digital performance, and within the overall form of theatre, as it is a live performance form with an audience that is complicit in the completion of the work in real time."

Cyberformances are "live theatrical performances in which remote participants are able to work together in real time through the medium of the internet." In her Master's Thesis, Jamieson states that "cyberformance, like all forms of theatre and artistic expression, offers a means to approach and respond to the changing world we exist in."

In 2008 Helen Varley Jamieson completed her MA (research) degree in Cyberformance from Queensland University of Technology entitled "Adventures in Cyberformance: experiments at the interface of theatre and the internet."

== UpStage ==
Helen Varley Jamieson is one of the founders of the online performance platform UpStage, along with the other members of Avatar Body Collision (see below). UpStage is an open source browser-based application that provides a real-time collaborative platform for remote artists and audiences. It hosts online festivals of cyberformances as well as workshops and presentations.

== Avatar Body Collision ==
Jamieson is a founding member of Avatar Body Collision, which "is a desktop theatre troupe in its own right". The Avatar Body Collision troupe is a "globally distributed performance group who live (mostly) in London, Helsinki, Aotearoa/New Zealand and cyberspace." They use a free, downloadable chat software to rehearse and perform their work.

== The Magdalena Project ==
Since 1997, Helen has been involved in the Magdalena Project, an international network of women in contemporary performance and theatre. She became involved with the New Zealand group, Magdalena Aotearoa, helping with the organisation of their 1999 International Festival of Women's Performance, and following that developed the Magdalena Project's first website. She became the project's "web queen" and continues to voluntarily maintain and update the project's web site and email list with the assistance of a small team of volunteers. She has attended and presented her work at many Magdalena festivals around the world. Significantly, in 2001 at the Transit III festival (Odin Teatret, Denmark), she presented for the first time a cyberformance to a theatre audience; the audience response to this work challenged her to explore the intersection of theatre and the internet in her ongoing work and forms a starting point for her Masters' thesis.

In 2015, Jamieson was instrumental in organising the first meeting of the Magdalena Project in Munich, Germany.

== Artistic work ==
Jamieson's artistic work encompasses experimental theatre, writing, installation, digital and cyberformance projects. She addresses environmental, social and political themes, and has developed participatory and conversational practices that invite audiences to actively engage with and contribute to the work.

Beginning with children's theatre classes at the Globe Theatre, Dunedin in the 1970s, Jamieson progressed to writing and directing plays at high school then studying theatre and playwriting (with Roger Hall) at the University of Otago. During the 1980s, she was a member of the Women's Performance Art Collective in Dunedin. In 1992 she was commissioned to write a play commemorating the centenary of women's suffrage in New Zealand, and her play Women Like Us was produced in Dunedin and Wellington (1993–94). During the 1990s she wrote, directed and produced plays at Taki Rua and BATS Theatre in Wellington, including co-directing with Tamsin Larby The Debate by Riwia Brown in the inaugural Young and Hungry season (1994). In 1994-95 she worked on Artslink, a community arts project in Wellington that aimed to develop an online database of arts information, and other arts administration, marketing and production jobs before moving into the web development industry.

Discovering online performance through Desktop Theater in 1999, Jamieson went on to produce an experimental hybrid online-offline research and performance project, the[abc]experiment, at BATS Theatre, Wellington, in 2001. As a result of this she formed the globally distributed cyberformance troupe Avatar Body Collision with Vicki Smith (Aotearoa New Zealand), Karla Ptaček (UK) and Leena Saarinen (Finland). From 2002 to 2007, Avatar Body Collision devised and performed 10 cyberformances, including hybrid online-offline work and performances that took place entirely online. The group functioned completely online and the four members have never met in the same physical space.

The cyberformance platform UpStage was developed by Avatar Body Collision, and used for their performances from 2004. Jamieson continues to be active within the UpStage community, using the platform for her online performances and organising events. From 2007 to 2012 she along with Vicki Smith and others curated and produced the series of six annual UpStage festivals, featuring programmes of cyberformance by artists from around the world.

Since 2000, Jamieson has collaborated internationally on numerous theatre, digital and online projects. Her artistic work contributes significantly to the emergent artform of cyberformance, and to the development and documentation of networked collaboration practices. She is an active participant in networks concerned with performance, online and digital art, and women's art and tech networks.

Jamieson's work as a producer includes in 2005 a promenade performance called Demeter's Dark Ride - An Attraction, directed by Madeline McNamara that was part of the STAB shows from BATS Theatre.

Selected works:

- Mobilise/Demobilise https://mobilise-demobilise.eu/: a series of artistic online performances that critically respond to a world of increasing conflict, crisis and emergency.
- We have a situation!: a series of live, trans-border, online-offline participatory performances addressing current cross-cultural issues, using UpStage (2013-ongoing).
- Unaussprechbarlich: an exploration of the painful, hilarious and life-changing experience of communicating in a language other than one’s mother-tongue; in collaboration with Annie Abrahams (2015-ongoing).
- her light stretches: an installation of text, song, light and mirrors, in collaboration with Helen Chadwick (2016-ongoing).
- Tales from the Towpath: an immersive story trail incorporating Geocaching, Zapper codes and live performance; in collaboration with Maya Chowdhry, Michelle Green and Sarah Hymas, for the 2014 Manchester Literature Festival.
- The CyPosium: one-day online symposium on cyberformance, 12 October 2012; following this Jamieson co-edited with Annie Abrahams CyPosium - the book (published by Link Editions, 2014).
- make-shift: networked performance connecting audiences in two domestic houses and online, in an exploration of consumption and disposability; in collaboration with Paula Crutchlow (2010–12).

== Plays ==
Women Like Us (1993) Commissioned by the Suffrage Centenary Trust.

Risky / Risque (1995)

Between (2001) Commissioned by Young & Hungry. Premiered at BATS Theatre during the 2001 Fringe.

Phone Jam (2002)

The Fifty Percent Party (2019) An update on Women Like Us celebrating women's fight for equality in parliament.

== Publications ==
- Digital Mobility / Mobile Thinking"; chapter in "Mobility in Culture: Conceptual Frameworks and Approaches", produced and published within the "i-Portunus Houses - Kick-Start a Local Mobility Host Network for Artists & Cultural Professionals in All Creative Europe Countries" implemented, on behalf of the European Commission, by a consortium of the European Cultural Foundation, MitOst e.V. and the Kultura Nova Foundation, 2022.
- Jamieson, Helen Varley, "We collaborate [t]here: processes of networked collaboration" in "Intersecting Art and Technology in Practice", eds. Camille Baker & Kate Sicchio, published by Routledge, 2017. ISBN 9781138934115, ebook 9781315678092.
- Jamieson, Helen Varley, "We have a Situation! Cyberformance and Civic Engagement in Post-Democracy", in "Convergence of Contemporary Art, Visual Culture, and Global Civic Engagement", ed. Ryan Shin, published by ICI Global, 2016. ISBN 9781522516651, ebook 9781522516668.
- Abrahams, Annie and Jamieson, Helen Varley (eds), "CyPosium - the book", published 2014 by Link Editions and La Panacée; ISBN 978-1-291-98892-5.
- Jamieson, Helen Varley, "La plateforme UpStage, la cyberformance et l’assistance (intermédiale)" in "Théâtre et intermédialité" ed. Jean-Marc Larrue, Lille (France), published by Presses Universitaires du Septentrion, 2014; ISBN 978-2-7574-0907-7.
- Buonaiuto, Francesco, Jamieson, Helen Varley, and Smith, Vicki, "The Net and the Butterfly", by Francesco Buonaiuto, published in the International Journal of Performance Arts and Digital Media Volume 10 Issue 1, 2014 – special issue on “Interdisciplinary Approaches to Documenting Performance”.
- Jamieson, Helen Varley, and Smith, Vicki, "UpStage: An Online Tool for Real-Time Storytelling" in Creative Technologies Journal, Issue 2, November 2011.
- Jamieson, Helen Varley. "Real Time, Virtual Space, Live Theatre" – chapter in the ADA Digital Arts Reader, published 2008, Clouds Publishing.
- Jamieson, Helen Varley, "UpStage: a platform for creating and performing online", in IEEE MultiMedia vol 14, no 3, July-Sept 2007.
- Jamieson, Helen Varley and Jung, Patricia,"Online performances mit UpStage" in "Video: Wiedergabe, Bearbeitung und Streaming unter Linux", ed. Nils Magnus and Torsten Spindler, published by Open Source Press, 2005. ISBN 978-3-937514-10-9.
