= Stephen A. Schrum =

Stephen Alan Schrum (born June 24, 1957) is a theatre director and associate professor of Theater Arts at the University of Pittsburgh at Greensburg. His most current research area being "The Perception of Presence in Virtual Performance". Schrum has created work on online based performance in virtual worlds, play writing and he has published a variety of books on theatre. Schrum currently teaches courses based on theatre and technology. Alongside lecturing over the past years Schrum has worked for Association for Theatre in Higher Education delivering conferences and workshops based on the topic Theatre and Technology. Prior to this, Schrum attended the University of California. It was there that he received his PhD in Dramatic Art. Alongside his PhD Schrum also has an MA in theatre from Ohio State University (1983) and a BA in theatre from Temple University (1981).

== Awards ==
- 2001-2005: Academic Advisor of the Year, University of Charleston.
- 1983: Calendar Magazine's "Best Theatrical Production" award for The Importance of Being Earnest, York, PA

== Online performance ==
Schrum uses online virtual performance platforms to create performances one being ATHEMOO that "served as a virtual theatre for a fairly large number of online performances". It allowed a new platform for performances to be based rather than in the conventional setting of a theatre space.

Aliens and the Internet is the title of four plays written by Schrum. He created a performance in 1996 called Net Seduction this was one performance that was part of the series and was staged in ATHEMOO, the performance "is set in an Internet chat room and meeting place, with a bar, dance floor, and people to meet". Schrum talked about this performance at a recent online cyposium, and this allowed for "cyberformers to discuss their online performances with other artists, researchers and interested participants" speaking about this performance created in 1996 in relation to today's vast amount technology and new performance platforms that have been created to allow artists to further develop cyberformance's, that are no longer text based, but allow for the creation of avatars.

A new performance that Schrum is working on as of October 2012 is a performance in Second Life in which Schrum aims to "model Antonin Artaud's Theatre of Cruelty" through the exploration of technology and performance.

== Playwriting ==
The details of Stephen A. Schrum's written plays have been taken from Schrum Biography or Interdisciplinary Arts

- 2012 Dog Assassin. University of Pittsburgh at Greensburg.
- 2009 Aliens three miles turn left. Second Life.
- 2006 Immaculate Misconceptions. University of Pittsburgh at Greensburg.
- 1999 Aliens! 3 Miles turn left.
- 1998 Adaptation of Euripides' Iphigenia at Aulis and Iphigenia in Tauris. Penn State Hazleton.
- 1996 NetSeduction, performed online at ATHEMOO.
- 1995 Changes and Abducted! at Penn State Hazleton.
- 1994 Aliens! 3 Miles, Turn Left at Penn State Hazleton.

== Publications ==
The details of Stephen A. Schrum's publications have been taken from either cyposium.net or musofyr Schrum Biography retrieved 26/10/2012

- Schrum, A Stephen. Theatre in Cyberspace: Issues of Teaching, Acting and Directing. Editor 2000 - One of his most widely held books held by 238 libraries worldwide.
- Schrum, A Stephen. Theatre in Second Life® Holds the VR Mirror Up To Nature, in Handbook of Research on Computational Arts and Creative Informatics. 2009
- Schrum, A Stephen. Teaching in the Virtual Theatre Classroom in Teaching Through Multi-User Environments. 2010
- Schrum, Stephen A. "Prometheus Bound Machinima." Virtual Education Journal, Volume 2, Issue 1 (July 2012), pp. 93–97. http://virtualeducationjournal.com/.
- Schrum, Stephen A. "Building a virtual reality model of Artaud’s theatre of cruelty," with Elliott Sheedy. Metaverse Creativity. II, 2 (October 2012), 205-ff.
- Schrum, Stephen A. "Steampunking Shakespeare: Selling an Apocryphal Play with Pop Culture" 2014. https://www.academia.edu/6214362/Steampunking_Shakespeare
- Schrum, Stephen A. "Digital Alchemy: On Transhuman Performance" 2016. https://www.academia.edu/25621517/Digital_Alchemy_On_Transhuman_Performance
- Schrum, Stephen A. "This Is Your Quest: How to Win Intro to Theatre Preamble" 2017 https://www.academia.edu/34326207/_This_Is_Your_Quest_How_to_Win_Intro_to_Theatre_Preamble_
- Schrum, Stephen A. "How to Win Introduction to Theatre." Theatre Topics, Volume 27, Number 2, July 2017. Online. https://jhuptheatre.org/theatre-topics/online-content/issue/volume-27-number-2-july-2017/how-win-introduction-theatre

== COLLAB-L ==
COLLAB-L is a listserv that Stephen A. Schrum is the owner of, it has purposely been built to help bring theatre artists together and help form collaborations with each other. Also was created "in order to facilitate the creation of new texts and performance works directly through internet contact".
