= Upstage =

Upstage may refer to:

- UpStage, an open source server-side application that has been purpose built for cyberformance
- Upstage (film), (also known as The Mask of Comedy) is a 1926 American silent romantic drama film
- Upstage (magazine), a free monthly publication founded by Gary Wien that covered arts and entertainment in New Jersey, US
- Upstage (stage position), in theatre, the rear of the stage area, farthest from the audience, is upstage
  - "Upstaging" refers to background actors drawing attention away from featured actors.
- The Upstage Club, a now closed influential music venue in Asbury Park, New Jersey
- Upstage (company), a South Korean artificial intelligence company
