= Creation Theatre Company =

British theatre company

Creation Theatre Company is a producing theatre based in Oxford, England. Founded in 1996 by David Parrish, the company became a charity in 2007 and produces site-specific adaptations of classic stories and Shakespeare.

== Management ==
Founding artistic director David Parrish announced his departure in 2010, to take on a producing role at the National Theatre of Norway. He was succeeded by James Erskine, who had previously worked for The Gate Theatre and Shakespeare's Globe. Erskine left the company in 2012 and Lucy Askew was the CEO and artistic producer until she left in April 2024. Helen Eastman is now artistic director and CEO of Creation Theatre.

== Cast and creative team ==
Creation does not have a fixed company of actors or artistic staff, instead using a freelance team for each project. Past directors include Laurie Sansom, Joanna Read, Richard Beecham, Gareth Machin, Tim Carroll, Natalie Abrahami, Jonathan Holloway, Charlotte Conquest and Gari Jones.

== Performance venues ==
Creation has never had a theatre building and produces shows in unusual spaces across the city of Oxford and beyond. The first productions, from 1996 to 2002 were performed open air in the grounds of Magdalen College School. For Christmas performances between 2004 and 2011 the company erected a Spiegeltent in the car park of BMW Group Plant with shows such as Beauty and the Beast and The Winter's Tale. Following its renovation in 2005, Creation has performed seven shows at Oxford Castle. In 2011, Creation was the first theatre company to perform at Blackwell's Bookshop to perform Doctor Faustus, and has gone on to perform Hamlet and The Odyssey, a co-production with The Factory Theatre Company, and Dr Jekyll & Mr Hyde. Since Christmas 2011 Creation has performed at The North Wall Arts Centre with A Christmas Carol, Aladdin and the Magical Lamp, The Lion, the Witch and the Wardrobe and The Wind in the Willows. Most recently, Creation has staged festive productions of Alice and Cinderella at The Mill Arts Centre, George Orwell's Nineteen Eighty-Four at the Oxford Mathematical Institute and a production of A Midsummer Night's Dream with scenes set across the Oxford City Centre. In 2019 Creation put on Dracula at the London Library. In 2020 Creation performed live performances online via Zoom including, The Tempest, The Time Machine | A Virtual Reality (an adaptation of The Time Machine) and Alice | A Virtual Theme Park (an adaptation of Alice's Adventures in Wonderland).

Pascale Aebischer and Rachael Nicholas, University of Exeter, released "The Digital Theatre Transformation Report - A Case study and a Digital Toolkit" in October 2020. The case study is based on Creation's digital production, The Tempest Live, Interactive and In Your Living Room, one of the first productions made for the digital stage utilising Zoom at the beginning of April 2020. The report is aimed at performers and companies embarking on transforming their physical theatre practice into a digital mode of home working for both office staff and creative practitioners.

== List of Creation productions ==
| Production | Year | Venue | Directed by |
|---|---|---|---|
| Romeo and Juliet | 1996 | Magdalen College School Grounds | Sebastian Doggart |
| Macbeth | 1997 | Magdalen College School Grounds | Zoe Seaton |
| Hamlet | 1998 | Magdalen College School Grounds | Zoe Seaton |
| The Tempest/ Antony and Cleopatra | 1999 | Magdalen College School Grounds | Zoe Seaton |
| A Midsummer Night's Dream | 2000 | Magdalen College School Grounds | Zoe Seaton |
| Alice Through the Looking Glass | 2000 | Magdalen College School Grounds | Laurie Sansom |
| Hamlet | 2001 | BMW Group Plant | Zoe Seaton |
| Romeo and Juliet | 2001 | Magdalen College School Grounds | Richard Beecham |
| Macbeth | 2002 | BMW Group Plant | Zoe Seaton |
| A Midsummer Night's Dream | 2002 | Magdalen College School Grounds | Zoe Seaton |
| Twelfth Night | 2003 | Headington Hill Park, Oxford | Charlotte Conquest |
| The Tempest | 2003 | Headington Hill Park, Oxford | Zoe Seaton |
| The Winter's Tale | 2004 | Mirror Tent, BMW | Justin Butcher |
| Much Ado About Nothing | 2004 | Headington Hill Park, Oxford | Charlotte Conquest |
| Romeo and Juliet | 2004 | Headington Hill Park, Oxford | Abigail Anderson |
| A Christmas Carol | 2004 | Mirror Tent, BMW | Abigail Anderson |
| The Comedy of Errors | 2005 | Mirror Tent, BMW | Charlotte Conquest |
| A Midsummer Night's Dream | 2005 | Headington Hill Park, Oxford | Zoe Seaton |
| The Snow Queen | 2005 | BMW Group Plant | Charlotte Conquest |
| King Lear | 2006 | BMW Group Plant | Douglas Rintoul |
| Macbeth | 2006 | Headington Hill Park, Oxford | Gareth Machin |
| The Merchant of Venice | 2006 | Oxford Castle | Gari Jones |
| Robin Hood | 2006 | Headington Hill Park, Oxford | Adam Meggido |
| Arabian Nights | 2006 | Mirror Tent, BMW | Dominic Cooke |
| Hamlet | 2007 | Oxford Castle Gardens | Gari Jones |
| The Taming of the Shrew | 2007 | Oxford Castle Unlocked Courtyard | Heather Davies |
| The Oxford Passion | 2007 | Oxford Castle Gardens | Charlotte Conquest |
| Tales from the Brother's Grimm | 2007 | Mirror Tent, BMW | Gari Jones |
| Measure for Measure | 2008 | North Wall Arts Centre, Oxford | Charlotte Conquest |
| Much Ado About Nothing | 2008 | Oxford Castle Unlocked Courtyard | Charlotte Conquest |
| Saints and Sinners | 2008 | St Michael at the North Gate | Heather Davies |
| A Midsummer Night's Dream | 2008 | Headington Hill Park (in promenade) | Zoe Seaton |
| Animal Farm | 2008 | Oxford Castle Gardens | Joanna Read |
| Hans Christian Andersen's Magical Tales | 2008 | Mirror Tent, BMW | Caroline Leslie |
| Othello | 2009 | New Road Baptist Church, Oxford | Charlotte Conquest |
| Twelfth Night | 2009 | Said Business School Rooftop Amphitheatre | Heather Davies |
| Beauty and the Beast | 2009 | Mirror Tent, MINI Plant Oxford | Sarah Punshon |
| Romeo and Juliet | 2010 | Said Business School Rooftop Amphitheatre | Charlotte Conquest |
| Rapunzel or The Magic Pig | 2010 | Mirror Tent, MINI Plant Oxford | Charlotte Conquest |
| Doctor Faustus | 2010 | Blackwell's Bookshop | Charlotte Conquest |
| Tales from King James | 2011 | St Barnabus Church | Helen Tennison |
| Antony and Cleopatra | 2011 | Said Business School Rooftop Amphitheatre | Helen Tennison |
| A Christmas Carol | 2011 | North Wall Arts Centre, Oxford | Charlotte Conquest |
| Hamlet | 2012 | Blackwell's Bookshop | Tim Carroll |
| The Odyssey | 2012 | Blackwell's Bookshop | Tim Carroll |
| Richard II | 2012 | Oxfam House | Ashtar Theatre Company |
| The Comedy of Errors | 2012 | Sheldonian Theatre | Corinne Jaber |
| The Merchant of Venice | 2012 | Said Business School Rooftop Amphitheatre | Natalie Abrahami |
| Aladdin and the Magic Lamp | 2012 | The North Wall Arts Centre | Charlotte Conquest |
| Jekyll and Hyde | 2013 | Blackwell's Bookshop | Caroline Devlin |
| Henry V | 2013 | Oxford Castle Unlocked Courtyard | Charlotte Conquest |
| The Lion, the Witch and the Wardrobe | 2013 | The North Wall Arts Centre | Charlotte Conquest |
| Macbeth | 2014 | Lady Margaret Hall | Jonathan Holloway |
| The Wind in the Willows | 2014 | North Wall Arts Centre, Oxford | Gari Jones |
| As You Like It | 2015 | Lady Margaret Hall | Tom Littler |
| Alice | 2015 | St Hugh's College | Helen Tennison |
| Treasure Island | 2015 | North Wall Arts Centre, Oxford | Gari Jones |
| Alice | 2015 | The Mill Arts Centre | Helen Tennison |
| King Lear | 2016 | The Norrington Room, Blackwell's Bookshop | Charlotte Conquest |
| A Midsummer Night's Dream | 2016 | Across West Oxford (in promenade) | Zoe Seaton |
| Hamlet | 2016 | University Parks | Gari Jones |
| Cinderella | 2016 | The Mill Arts Centre | Helen Tennison |
| Snow White and Other Tales from the Brother's Grimm | 2016 | The North Wall Arts Centre | Gari Jones |
| Nineteen Eighty Four | 2017 | Oxford's Mathematical Institute | Jonathan Holloway |
| A Midsummer Night's Dream | 2017 | Across West Oxford (in promenade) | Zoe Seaton |
| Alice | 2017 | University Parks | Helen Tennison |
| Swallows & Amazons | 2018 | University Parks | |
| Pictures of Dorian Gray | 2019 | Blackwells | Tom Littler (Jermyn Street Theatre) |
| The Tempest | 2019 | Osney Mead (in promenade) | Zoe Seaton |
| Don Quixote | 2019 | Oxford Covered Market | Jonathan Holloway |
| The Snow Queen | 2019/20 | North Wall Arts Centre, Oxford | |
| Bleak House | 2020 | Blackwell's Bookshop | Deborah Newbold |
| The Tempest Live | 2020 | Live online via Zoom - Digital Theatre | Zoe Seaton |
| The Time Machine | A Virtual Reality | 2020 | Live online via Zoom - Digital Theatre | Natasha Rickman |
| Alice | A Virtual Theme Park | 2020 | Live online via Zoom - Digital Theatre | Zoe Seaton |
| Shakespeare on Zoom - The Merry Wives of WhatsApp | 2020 | Live online via Zoom - Digital Theatre | Natasha Rickman |
| Shakespeare on Zoom - Horatio! & Hamlet | 2020 | Live online via Zoom - Digital Theatre | Nicholas Osmond |
| The Wonderful Wizard of Oz | 2020 | Live online via Zoom - Digital Theatre | Gari Jones |
| The Wind in the Willows | 2021 | Sunnymead Meadow, Oxford | Helen Eastman |
| The Witch of Edmonton | 2022 | Live online via Zoom - Digital Theatre | Laura Wright |
| Friar Lawrence's Confessional | 2022 | Live online via Zoom - Digital Theatre | Nicholas Osmond |
| The Tale of the Beauty and the Tail of the Beast | 2022 | North Wall Arts Centre, Oxford | Natasha Rickman |
| The Emperor of the Moon | 2023 | Live online via Zoom - Digital Theatre | Gari Jones |
| The Signalman | 2023 | Wesley Memorial Church, Oxford | Jonathan Holloway |
| Much Ado About Nothing | 2023 | South Oxford Adventure Playground (SOAP) | Helen Tennison |
| The Alchemist | 2023 | The Mathematical Institute, Oxford & Conduit Street, London | Anna Tolputt |
| A Christmas Carol | 2023 | North Wall Arts Centre, Oxford | Gari Jones |
| Boatman Town | 2024 | Tour of pubs in Oxfordshire, Hertfordshire and London | Helen Eastman |
| Animal Farm | 2024 | Summertown United Reformed Church & Greenwich Theatre, London | Helen Eastman |
| As You Like It | 2024 | Wycliffe Hall Grounds - Open Air Theatre | Lucy Pitman-Wallace |
| Treasure Island | 2024 | Wycliffe Hall Grounds - Open Air Theatre | Gari Jones |
| Extinction Monologues | 2024 | Oxford | Glyn Maxwell |
| Even Stranger with Barney Norris | 2024 | Summertown United Reformed Church | |
| Hansel & Grettel | 2024 | North Wall Arts Centre, Oxford | Paul Boyd |

== Critical reception ==
| Publication | Year | Excerpt |
|---|---|---|
| 2ndfrombottom | 2021 | "Visually the production is a treat and deploys some clever video trickery" |
| From page to stage | 2020 | "An imaginative and enjoyable show for these extraordinary times" |
| Love London Love Culture | 2020 | "immensely enjoyable, fun-filled and ambitious" |
