= Annie Abrahams =

Dutch artist

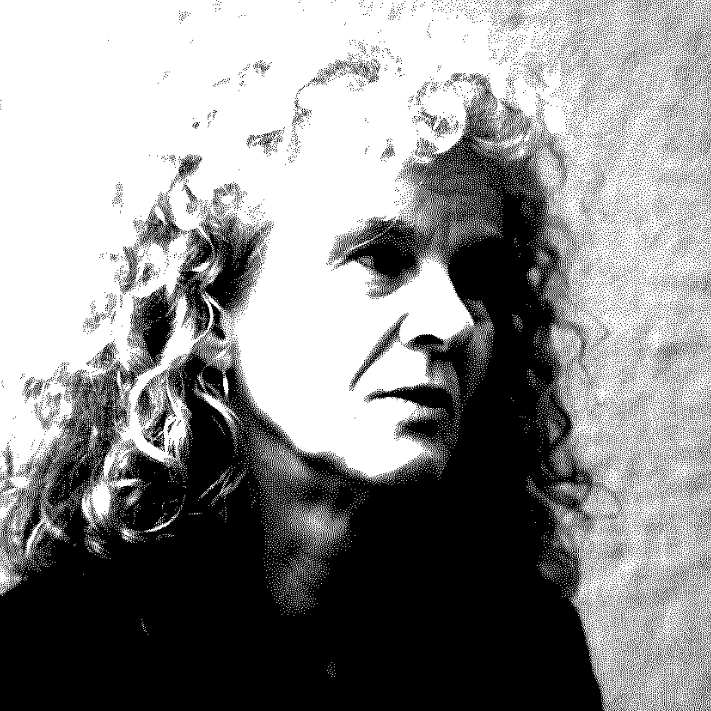
- Born: 17 May 1954 (age 72); Hilvarenbeek, Netherlands
- Education: University of Utrecht, Academy of Fine Arts Arnhem

Annie Abrahams (born 1954) is a Dutch performance artist specialising in video installations and internet based performances, often deriving from collective writings and collective interaction. Born and raised in Hilvarenbeek in the Netherlands, she migrated to and settled in France in 1987. Her performance work challenges and questions the limitations and possibilities of online communication and collaboration.

Abrahams describes her body of work as "an aesthetics of trust and attention." Studying biology became an inspiration for her future line of work. "When studying biology I had to observe a colony of monkeys in a zoo. I found this very interesting because I learned something about human communities by watching the apes. In a certain way I watch the internet with the same appetite and interest. I consider it to be a universe where I can observe some aspects of human attitudes and behaviour without interfering."

== Life and career ==
Abrahams was born in a small farmers' village in the Netherlands with four younger sisters. She gained a doctorate in Biology from the University of Utrecht (1978) and a diploma from the Academy of Fine Arts Arnhem (1985).

Brought into a world of agriculture, her academic pathway led her to become internationally known for her pioneering networked performance art and collective writing experiments. After gaining a Doctoraal (M2) in Biology from the University of Utrecht (1978), she was assigned as an assistant researcher at the university. At the same time she studied painting, and after gaining a Diploma from the Academy of Fine Arts Arnhem (1985), Abrahams received arts funding from the Dutch government to practice in France, where she moved to in 1987 and continued painting. Abrahams began to work with computer software (specifically DOEK, created for her by Jan de Weille in 1993) to develop and construct installations based on the complexities of her paintings. In 1992 her computer drawings were exhibited in her show Possibilities, located at the l'espace Forum in Nice, France. After a first experience in 1996 with a website especially made for an exhibition in the Hollandsche Spoorweg in Nijmegen, Abrahams decided to start working specifically for the web. From 1996, Abrahams delved further into networked performance, with an emphasis on space and distance social networking entails, by creating a physical space to interact with the 'virtual world' in a show in Nijmegen. She developed a website called Being Human with net art works she described as performative interventions in the public space of loneliness = the Internet (1997–2007).

Abrahams taught at the University of Montpellier as part of the arts department from 2002 until 2005. Following this, she curated InstantS for the net.art platform panoplie.org (2006 to January 2009) and the online performance series Breaking Solitude and Double Blind (2007, 2008 and 2009)

Abrahams continued to explore computer functions, telematic performance, and visitor choices through artworks that are concerned with an appreciation of beauty through contemplation and observation of aesthetic detail (for example Separation, Painsong, Karaoke). In a 2005 interview by ARTeMEDIA, she makes reference to her educational background in biology and her engagement with social networking, comparing the new and continuously developing form of social networking to the engagement and communication skills of monkeys in her studies, concluding that the internet has great potential as a universal platform for many new modalities of interaction.

Abrahams also engaged with the traces left behind from a performance on the personal level, as well as generating a new collaborative voice, as can be seen in her 2006 collaborations with Clement Charmet in The Webflaneur; "a Data Dandy trip" and with Igor Stromajer in Operra Internettikka.

Since 2007, Abrahams' work delves into and contextualizes how people react and form relationships in distributed online groups, for example in Huis Clos / No Exit and Angry Women. She has collaborated with a number of artists including Mark River, MTAA, Nicolas Frespech, Igor Stomajer, and Antye Greie. Her interactive performances often follow a desired 'footprint left in the sand' imprinted and left by the duration of the piece as well as formulating and creating a collective language from many different ethnicities and identities of individuals. The key factor of investigation revolves around the notion of human behavior when presented with a new interactive archive of networked based performance; she explores how participants 'click' and 'choose' opportunities to create new behaviors and perhaps a new way of thinking, for example a personal interaction without any interference from peers in ViolenceS, a 2009 collaboration with Nicolas Frespech.

== Works ==
=== Being Human (1997–2007) ===
Abrahams developed the concept of networked performances with the project Being Human. This project explored the capabilities of participants in developing online relationships whilst in the comfort of their own space. Abraham's performance work engages and intersects with the physical space and networking technologies, creating the ability to produce new creative mediums, spaces and artworks such as networked performances, net.art pieces, installations, videos and collecting writing projects. Being Human attempts to outline both the capabilities and the restrictions network communication can bring. Abrahams states "[t]he site [Being Human] is based on the idea that the internet is an artistic medium that permits addressing people in their own intimacy, non-mediated by an art context." Being Human is reviewed in, which explains the relationships that Abrahams provides between moods, emotions, words, fonts, screen, and color. The meaning here depends on different visual interventions to underline different emotional states and intensities.

The project and parts of it have been exhibited in various forms of new media from video festivals to international shows. and discussed at electronic poetry venues and magazines and websites.

=== Double Blind (love) (2009) ===
The telepresence performance Double Blind (love), in collaboration with Curt Cloninger, presented the two artists' first encounter in real life. They were located in different places, Abrahams being in the Living Room in France and Cloninger was at the Black Mountain College Museum and Arts centre. Both performers sang repeatedly to each other through real time/space and online social networks; they used the words "love, love, love" with their webcams showing a close-up. They were both blindfolded, in order to create a sense of isolation in the space they were confined to, and to allow them to connect with each other. They continued to sing until one of them decided to stop. Both video projections were visible to each other as well as in a space where audience members could watch both screens. The performance was broadcast on Selfworld.net (an online web streaming platform that no longer exists) and audience members were invited to see it in a live performance space.

=== If Not You Not Me (2010) ===
Abrahams first networked performance from the UK, If Not You Not Me, took place at the HTTP gallery in London in 2010. It incorporated previous projects such as the One the Puppet of Other (2007) and The Big Kiss (2008) with its central communicative medium entitled Shared Still Life/Nature Morte Partagée. The exhibition held the event entitled Shared Still Life/Nature Morte Partagée which was centralized with a telematic still life for mixed media and LED message board. Participants were given the opportunity to communicate with those at Kawenga – territoires numériques, situated in the media arts centre in Montpellier, France where they played and rearranged objects in still life whilst sending messages between each other.

On 12 February, On Collaboration Graffiti Wall combined text and audio communication: participants reflected on the problems that persisted in online collaboration on a website created for the exhibition. This documentation and reflection were displayed to other participants throughout the duration of the exhibition. Subsequently, Huis Clos/No Exit – Jam, a sequel from an earlier telematic performance event, challenged the reception of auditory information through collaborating to create a sound performance using webcams from across the world in which played throughout the exhibition.

In a review written by Maria Chatzichritodulou, she comments on how the minimal use of physical objects gave the performance a sort of 'nakedness' whilst creating a still life piece of artwork from stationery and office equipment. Chatzichristodoulou compares the performance to similar more technologically complex performances such as Hole-In-Space, which used satellite technologies, and the imposing advances of internet telephony protocols such as the application Skype, and concludes that If Not You not Me emphasises how the physical surroundings and the implication of a durational performances can contribute to the power of a performance by simplifying the technology to a simple screen and webcam. It also initiates a technological and physical exchange between participants as well as recognising a disconnection from an intangible corporeal reality shared by fellow active audience members. This performance event also included On Collaboration Graffiti and Graffiti Wall, establishing traces of collaborative work (written, sound and video messages) that imposed on the subsequent live installations.

=== Huis Clos/No Exit – On Collaboration and Jam (2010) ===
Abrahams challenges the dramatic orderings in her web performance of Huis Clos/No Exit – On Collaboration situated in CNES La Chartreuse in early 2010 for six performers whom became accustomed to reading material, illustrations that symbolized and depicted computer monitors. The purpose was to make the creation come to life through the performers. With the title pertaining to a theatrical terms as a claustrophobic piece of Satre, Abrahams integrates the virtual world and the performance device at a distance through the visual and audio recordings of a webcam clustered together to create a split screen. The objective of the piece was to test the levels of intimacy that can be gained from webcam sessions through a task based activity. The performers were then asked to create a single human face using the entire video frame of the webcams, made up of skins and bodies and evoking a sense of unity and intimacy despite the singular audio and visual capture of each performer.

This methodology of performance was then adapted and re-performed on a smaller scale with four performers instead of six. As part of the festival based in London If Not You Not Me at the HTTP Gallery in London (12 February till 20 March 2010) it furthered Abrahams' concept of employing traces from previous events. The adaptation is entitled as Huis Clois/No Exit – Jam; the four performers Antye Greie (Finland), Pascale Gustin (France), Helen Varley Jamieson (New Zealand) and Maja Kalogera (Spain/Croatia) were given the task to synchronize sound together whilst competing with the technological constraints such as time delay when transferring from peer to peer. As part of the whole exhibition in London, Abrahams used digital technologies that accessible to the general public and communicates the factors that create a 'disconnection' in amongst a live video/sound collaboration. This fragmented connection between peers in both the virtual and real words consequently generates a fragmented intimacy, frustrations of connectivity (real-time application), shared absences and the desperation to connect from a distance as well as the body's needs of relieving sensual longing in regards to corporeal reality. Huis Clos/No Exit was also presented at On Translation, NIMK Amsterdam, 2010, with Ruth Catlow, Paolo Cirio, Ursula Endlicher, Niciolas Frespech and Igor Stromajer.

=== Angry Women (2012–) ===
In 2012 Abrahams started the project Angry Women. This was an emotional journey for a group of women participants who, connected via webcams and with Abrahams as the facilitator, expressed and shared their inner frustrations with the condition to remain on camera throughout. Abrahams commented that the performance also tested the cultural barriers between women. In total, 24 participants took part in the installation. The webcam conversations were also presented on a 3x4 grid. The project developed as a research project of 5 performances with only women, an Angry Man performance that took place on 12 April 2012 in Labomedia Orleans, followed by two mixed gender versions for the 2012 Upstage festival. Videos of Angry Women Take 1 & 2 were shown in Training for a Better World, Abrahams' solo exhibition at the CRAC Sète (28 October 2011 – 1 January 2012).

In a questionnaire in 2012, Abrahams stated that her original reason for studying biology was the quest to find answers about herself and the world she is living in; however, this proved indecisive and so she pursued a career in creating artworks that taught her how to live and how to respond to what life presents. The internet is part of her daily life, and her social engagement online allows her to interweave iteration, producing glitches, connection resistance (through buffering and dis/reconnection), sending information, and recognizing holes in the time space continuum. Abrahams proposes that Sherry Turkle's description of how we hide behind technology instead of engaging in more direct and intimate relationships with people is just one part of what is happening: at the same time, new modalities of communication are developing online. Abrahams also asserts that while social networking platforms such as Facebook encourage users to give clear optimistic images of themselves, it becomes more and more important to cherish and reveal the 'messy' sides within us and to find room for the darker side of human nature, as she found in her exercises for Huis Clos/No Exit. Her performances continue to reveal human behaviours that we consciously or perhaps subconsciously try to avoid.

In 2012 she co-organised the first CyPosium – an online symposium on cyberformance, and published Trapped to Reveal – On webcam mediated communication and collaboration, in JAR No. 2.

=== Reading Club (2013–) ===
In 2013, Abrahams and Emmanuel Guez began the ReadingClub, an online venue for collaborative reading and writing performances. The project was included in the show Erreur d'Impression, curated by Alessandro Ludovico at publier à l'ère du numérique, Jeu de paume, Paris in November 2013 and the Electronic Literature Collection volume 3, February 2016.

=== from estranger to e-stranger (2014) ===
From April to August 2014 while on a residency at CONA in Ljubljana, Slovenia, Abrahams explored what it means to be an '(e)stranger'. The project involved a website, a performance and the publication of a book.

=== Pandemic Encounter (2021) ===
Abrahams created a sound piece meant to externalise the discomfort felt by people during the COVID-19 pandemic through the raw and raspy reality in a "song" where personal respirations and computer generated distorted heart beats mix. She gathered extracts from "Silences" by Frans van Lent to provide more background sounds to further the experience of anxiety and loneliness felt by people all over the world during the pandemic.

== Awards and honors ==
Abrahams' works have been featured in festivals such as the Moscow Film Festival, the International Film Festival, Rotterdam and the Stuttgarter Filmwinter, and have been displayed around the world, especially in France at the Jeu de Paume, the Centre Pompidou, the CRAC, Sète, and the Paris–Villette theatre. Abrahams has also been featured in international galleries and museums including The Museum of Contemporary Art in Zagreb, the Black Mountain College Museum and Arts Center in Asheville, North Carolina, the Espai d'Art Contemporani de Castelló in Spain, the New Museum in New York, the Armenian Center for Contemporary Experimental Art in Yerevan, the Furtherfield gallery in London, Aksioma, Ljubljana, and NIMk, in Amsterdam.

== See also ==
- List of electronic literature authors, critics, and works
- Digital poetry
- E-book#History
- Electronic literature
- Hypertext fiction
- Interactive fiction
- Literatronica
