= Wortzel =

Wortzel is a surname. Notable people with the surname include:

- Adrianne Wortzel (born 1941), American contemporary artist
- Larry Wortzel (born 1947), U.S. Army scholar
