= Cyberformance =

Theatrical performance

Cyberformance refers to live theatrical performances in which remote participants are enabled to work together in real time through the medium of the internet, employing technologies such as chat applications or purpose-built, multiuser, real-time collaborative software (for example, UpStage, Visitors Studio, the Waterwheel Tap, MOOs, and other platforms). Cyberformance is also known as online performance, networked performance, telematic performance, and digital theatre; there is as yet no consensus on which term should be preferred, but cyberformance has the advantage of compactness. For example, it is commonly employed by users of the UpStage platform to designate a special type of Performance art activity taking place in a cyber-artistic environment.

Cyberformance can be created and presented entirely online, for a distributed online audience who participate via internet-connected computers anywhere in the world, or it can be presented to a proximal audience (such as in a physical theatre or gallery venue) with some or all of the performers appearing via the internet; or it can be a hybrid of the two approaches, with both remote and proximal audiences and/or performers.

== History and context ==
The term 'cyberformance' (a portmanteau word blending 'cyberspace' with 'performance') was coined by the net artist and curator Helen Varley Jamieson. She states that the invention of this term in 2000 "came out of the need to find a word that avoided the polarisation of virtual and real, and the need for a new term (rather than 'online performance' or 'virtual theatre') for a new genre". Jamieson traces the history of cyberformance back to the Satellite Arts Project of 1977, when interactive art pioneers Kit Galloway and Sherrie Rabinowitz used live video mixing to create what they called "a performance space with no geographic boundaries".

Online performances or virtual theatre has taken place in a number of virtual environments that have emerged since the 1980s, including the multi-user virtual environments known as MUDs and MOOs in the 1970s, internet chat spaces (e.g. Internet Relay Chat, or IRC) in the 1980s, the Palace graphical chatroom in the 1990s, and UpStage, Visitors Studio, Second Life, Waterwheel Tap and other platforms in the 2000s. Notable cyberformance groups and projects thus far include:

- The Hamnet Players. Founded by Stuart Harris, this group performed in IRC; their earliest performance was "Hamnet" in 1993.
- The Plaintext Players. Founded by Antoinette LaFarge, this group performs in MOOs and mixed reality spaces; their earliest performance was "Christmas" in 1994.
- "ParkBench." Created by Nina Sobell and Emily Hartzell in 1994, this was a collaborative performance and drawing space using live video and a web browser interface.
- Desktop Theater. Founded by Adriene Jenik and Lisa Brenneis, this group performed in the Palace; an example of their work is "waitingforgodot.com", 1997.
- Avatar Body Collision. Founded by Helen Varley Jamieson, Karla Ptacek, Vicki Smith, and Leena Saarinen in 2002, this online performance collective uses UpStage, a web-based software purpose-built for cyberformance.
- aether9. A collaborative art project exploring the field of realtime video transmission, initiated in 2007 by artists from Europe, North and South America.
- Avatar Orchestra Metaverse (AOM). A formation in the virtual online environment Second Life (SL), exploring interactive possibilities with avatars.
- Second Front. A pioneering performance art group in the online, avatar-based Virtual Reality world of Second Life.
- Low Lives. An international festival of live performance-based works transmitted via the internet and projected in real time at multiple venues around the world.

== Features of cyberformance ==
Cyberformance differs from digital performance, which refers to any kind of digitally mediated performance, including those with no significant networked element. In some cases cyberformance may be considered a subset of net art; however, many cyberformance artists use what is termed 'mixed reality' or 'mixed space' for their work, linking physical, virtual, and cyber spaces in manifold ingenious ways. The internet is often a subject and inspiration of the work as well as being the central enabling technology.

Cyberformers often work with the dual identities afforded by avatars, exploiting the gap between online persona and offline self. They can also take advantage of the ease of switching between avatars in a way unavailable to 'proximal' actors. However cyberformance has its own unique problems, including unstable technology and "real life" interruptions.
