= Alexander Parsonage =

Alexander Parsonage may refer to:

- Alexander Parsonage (theatre director) (born 1980), English actor, writer and theatre director
- Alexander Parsonage (water polo) (born 1985), British water polo player
