= UpStage =

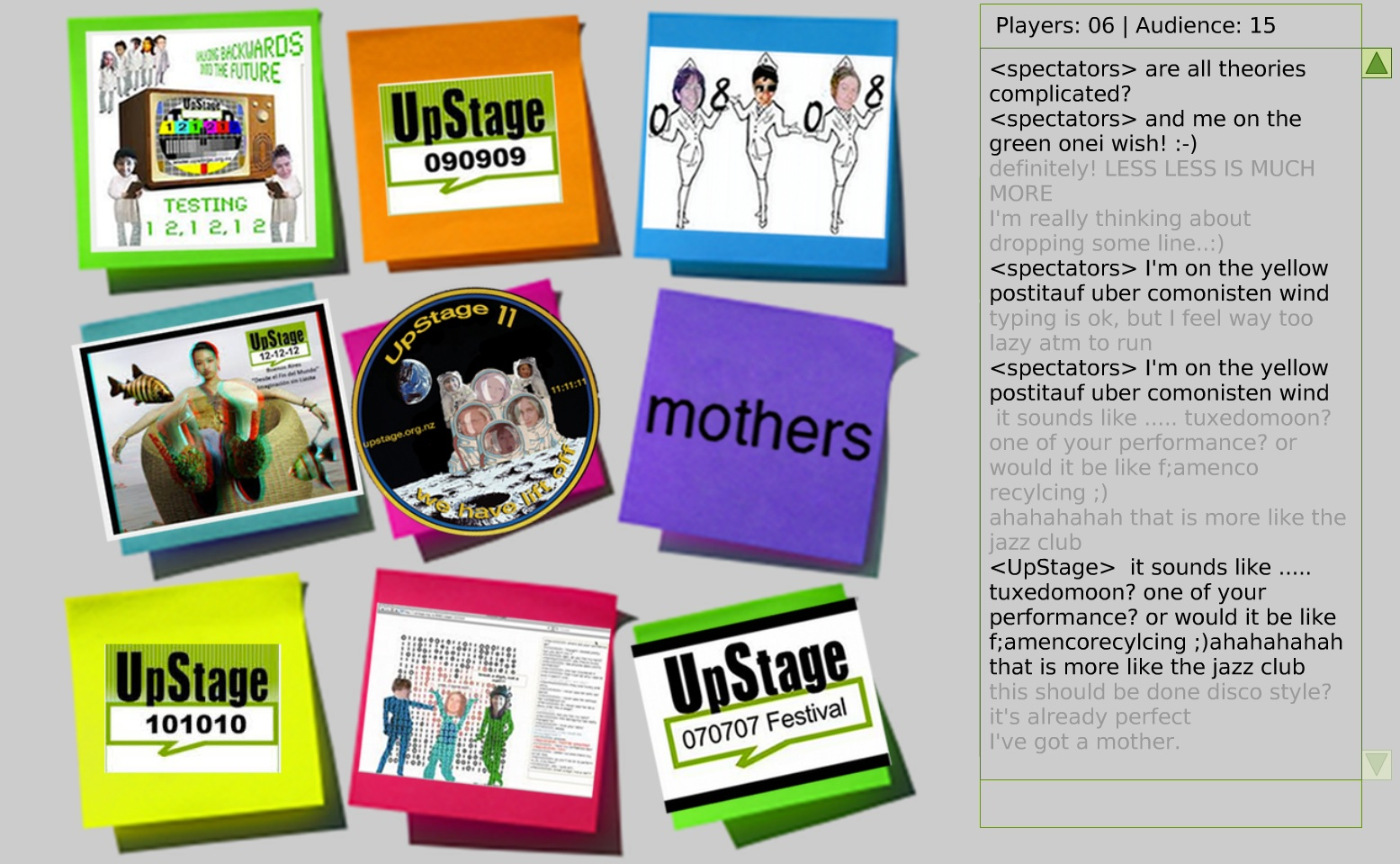
Screengrab from "Vita Cyberformativa", by Miljana Peric, performed at the UpStage 10th Birthday Party, 9 January, 2014

UpStage is an open-source, server-side application designed for Cyberformance, where multiple artists collaborate in real time to create and present live theatrical performances for audiences who can be online or in a shared space and who can interact with the performance via a text chat tool. It can also be understood as a form of digital puppetry. UpStage is the first open-source platform designed specifically for avatar performances.

== History and context ==
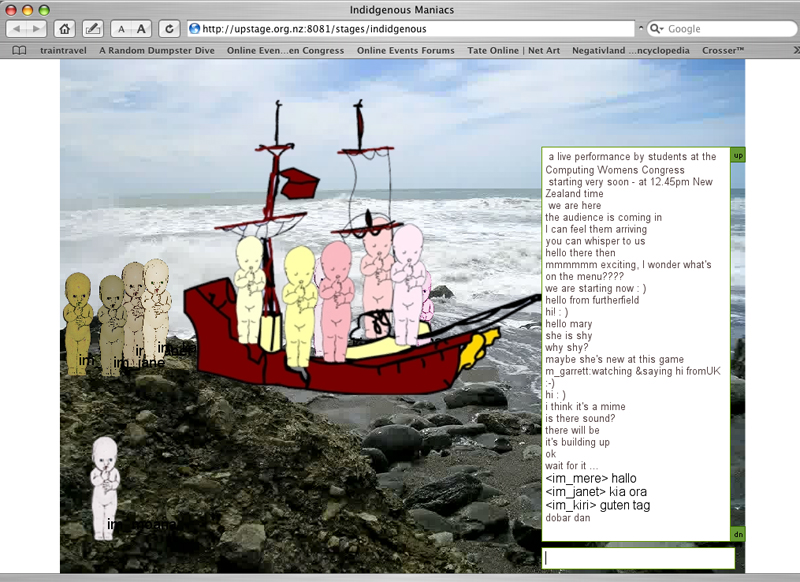
Screengrab from "Indigenous Maniacs", a performance created by UpStage workshop participants at the Computing Women's Congress, Waikato University (NZ), February 2006

UpStage was developed in 2003 by programmer Douglas Bagnall to realize the vision of the cyberformance troupe "Avatar Body Collision". The group had been creating live performances on the internet using free chat applications, but they wanted to create an application that better met their artistic needs. The first version of the software was created with a grant from the Smash Palace Collaboration Fund, a joint initiative of Creative New Zealand and the NZ Ministry for Research, Science and Technology. It was launched on 9 January, 2004 and began to be used by artists and students around the world, as well as by the originators, Avatar Body Collision.

In 2006, the School of Computing and Mathematical Sciences at the Auckland University of Technology began collaborating with the UpStage project. Software development students in their final year worked on UpStage as a real-world software development project, providing ongoing maintenance and development for the software.

Also in 2006, UpStage received a second grant from the Community Partnership Fund of the New Zealand government's Digital Strategy, which enabled the development of UpStage V2. Douglas Bagnall was the lead developer, working in conjunction with the AUT students. UpStage V2 was launched in June 2007, with a two-week exhibition at the New Zealand Film Archive and the first UpStage festival, 070707. The festival featured 13 performances by artists from around the world and took place over a 12-hour period on 7 July, 2007.

A second festival was held on 080808 (8–9 August 2008), covering an 18-hour period and involving artists from at least 14 different time zones. It was reviewed in the Australian Stage Online. Following this, festivals were held annually on corresponding dates each year, culminating in 121212 (12 December 2012), when the festival extended over one week and included cyberformance on UpStage and other online platforms. A number of works from previous festivals were restaged as a retrospective program within the festival.

The 10-year anniversary of UpStage was celebrated 13 months after 121212, with a mini-festival of three performances and a meeting to discuss the future of UpStage. At this point, UpStage was sustained by volunteers, including the AUT student team. The meeting took place in Wellington, New Zealand, with online participants joining via UpStage. It was agreed that the project should continue, and that the software needed to be redeveloped to take advantage of newer technologies, and be more easily developed and maintained by globally dispersed open source developers. The work on a complete rebuild of the platform began in 2020, with funding from Creative Europe for the project Mobilise/Demobilise, and the new platform was launched in October 2021 at the Mobilise/Demobilise festival.

== Features of UpStage ==
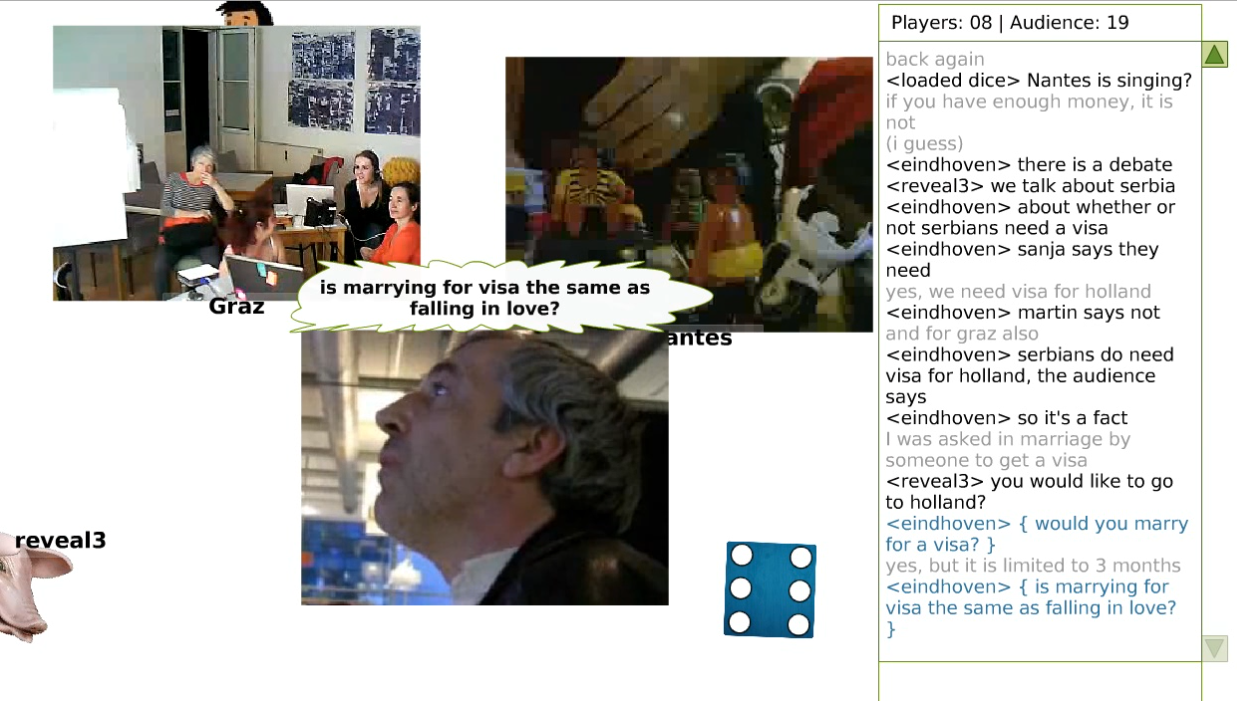
Screengrab from the cyberformance "We have a situation – Peopoly", performed online in UpStage and at De Bibliotheek Eindhoven on 18 April, 2013

As a web-based server-side application, UpStage can be accessed by both performers and audiences from almost any internet-connected computer, using any operating system and browser; however, computers behind firewalls may require specific ports to be open. The simplicity of the user interface allows new users to learn how to navigate UpStage fairly quickly, and the application itself is highly accessible since no additional software download is required.

Players log into UpStage and have access to the Studio, where they can upload media, create stages, and assign media to stages. Audience members, also known as "chatters", do not log in; they simply follow a link from an email or another web page and arrive at the stage, which loads as a web page in their browser. They do not see any of the player tools, but can see and hear everything the players are creating on the stage. They can also chat in the text chat along with the players; audience chat appears gray and silent, while player chat is black and spoken aloud.

The media used in UpStage performances is created outside of UpStage using graphic or audio software. Once optimized for UpStage, it is uploaded via the web interface known as the Studio and becomes available to everyone who has a login for that particular UpStage server.

UpStage is an open-source project; it can be downloaded from the GitHub site and installed on a web server, giving control over who has login access. The interface can also be customized.

== Artists using UpStage ==
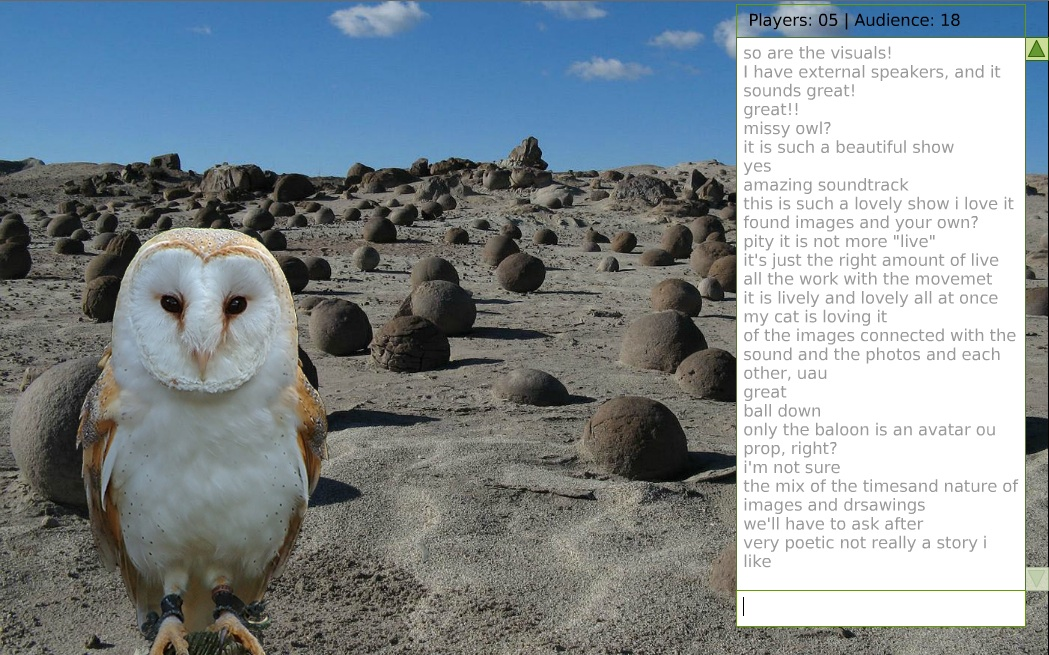
Screen grab from "Balloon", by Petyr Veenstra, Gabriella Sacco, and Floris Sirag, performed at the UpStage 10th Birthday Party, 9 January, 2014

Current:

- Christina Papagiannouli and Etheatre
- Clara Gomes
- Gabriella Sacco, Floris Sirag, and Petyr Veenstra
- Helen Varley Jamieson
- Katarina Djordjevic Urosevic & colleagues
- Miljana Peric
- KiG! Kultur in Graz
- Teater InterAkt
- Eva Ursprung
- Vicki Smith

Past (a complete list of artists who have worked with UpStage is available on the UpStage website):

- Avatar Body Collision
- ActiveLayers
- Anaesthesia Associates
- Plaintext_Players (Antoinette LaFarge & company)
- Ben Unterman and colleagues
- Marlena Corcoran
- Pauline Bastard
- Kristin Carlson & Sheila Page
- Rebekah Wild
- Helena Martin Franco
