= Jonathan Holloway (playwright) =

English theatre director and playwright

Jonathan Holloway (born 1955 in Dulwich, South London) is an English theatre director and playwright. He founded and directed two professional companies in British fringe and touring theatre in the 1980s and 1990s, notably Red Shift Theatre Company. His work has won three Edinburgh Fringe First awards (1987, 1988, 1989), the Shakespeare Prize at Chile's World Festival of Theatre in 1993, and in 2013 his BBC version of George Orwell's Nineteen Eighty-Four won a First Prize at the Prix Italia. He is a Fellow of the Royal Society of Arts and in 2005 he was made an Honorary Fellow of St Mary's University, Twickenham.

== Education and early career ==
Holloway left school at the age of 16 and gained experience as an actor in the Oxford University Players at the Edinburgh Fringe. In Edinburgh he saw performances given by Steven Berkoff, Lindsay Kemp and Jerzy Grotowski, then studied at St Mary's University Twickenham, at the Laban Centre, at the International Centre for Theatre Creations (Paris) while resident at the Almeida Theatre London, and completed an MA at North London Poly.

He worked at London's Royal Court Theatre in 1977–78, initially as technical manager of its studio space, The Theatre Upstairs. He then became an assistant director working in the Main House, and directed his own production in the Theatre Upstairs. In 1978–79 Holloway toured as a performer with the community arts outfit, Free form Arts Trust. In 1979, he co-founded The East End Theatre group, a theatre company based at Chat's Palace Arts Centre in Homerton, East London, with writer Dave Fox and others.

== Red Shift ==
In 1982 Holloway, in collaboration with the designer Charlotte Humpston, founded a group called Red Shift Theatre Company, which grew into a medium-sized national touring company. Holloway directed nearly all of Red Shift's over 50 shows and also wrote plays performed by the company. Red Shift gave around 175 performances annually, mainly in the UK but also in Egypt, Santiago de Chile and Hong Kong. Holloway wrote in 1994 that "everyone enjoys a good story and provided they are convinced that that's what they're getting they will sit down and concentrate regardless of whether they're an audience of redundant mineworkers in Mansfield or a sophisticated Home Counties crowd." The Guardian's Lynn Gardner observed in 2003 that under Holloway's artistic direction, Red Shift was one of the very few theatre companies to have survived more than twenty years, describing it as "tireless". The company became known for "reworking classic tales into fun theatre shows", as well as for "its heady mix of entertainment and aesthetics". Robert Shaughnessy wrote in 2013 that the company in the 1980s had an "appealingly original, innovative and occasionally iconoclastic way with classic texts".

Red Shift first appeared at the Edinburgh Festival in 1983, and was described by Gardner in 2009 as "raising the tone of theatre" at the Festival. An early production was the successful The Duchess of Malfi (1982–84), at the Edinburgh Festival and then on tour, which used a 1950s setting and referenced films. This was followed by a "disastrous" version of George Orwell's Nineteen Eighty-Four with students of the University of Surrey. Holloway's successful 1986 adaptation of Romeo and Juliet at the YWCA, Edinburgh, focused on the play's violence rather than its romance. It used six actors, with the part of Romeo being divided among the three men, and Juliet among the three women; it also reordered scenes, repeating some, and redistributed lines from the Shakespeare version. It was described in a review for Shakespeare Bulletin as a "daring revisioning" that might have "trashed Shakespeare" but "provocatively invited a fresh, if peculiar, look" at the original.

In 1989, its production of Timon of Athens was the subject of a The Late Show special on BBC2. It cast a woman in the title role, a first in English professional theatre, and like Romeo and Juliet, used repeated scenes "to destabilize both textual and production authority". Robert Shaughnessy wrote in 2013 that the performance was a "montage of mannered tableaux in which chunks of the play were ponderously interwoven with extracts from contemporary feminist writings about self-image and self-esteem". Susan Bennett, also in 2013, described it as a "quite tantalizing revision" of one of those so-called 'problem plays'". Holloway stated that the hostile reception by the London critics – the production received, for example, a highly critical contemporary review from Jeremy Kingston in The Times – was not mirrored in most audiences outside the capital.

A 1999–2000 production of Hamlet: First Cut toured 19 locations including the Bloomsbury Theatre, London. Dorothea Kehler, in a review for Shakespeare Bulletin, described it as "an engrossing show"; she praised Holloway's "intelligent direction", the spare, "abstract" staging, based around four metal tetrahedra, which "created an atmosphere of wartime shabbiness and neglect", and the costumes, especially Gertred's vampire-like outfits. She commented on the use of even major characters to double as stage hands, which underlined the play's "appearance-versus-reality concerns", as well as the fact that dead characters remained upright on stage and then were recycled as stage hands. Peter J. Smith, in a review for Cahiers Elisabethains, describes the production as "effective" and "economical", with twenty-three parts taken by eight actors; he also praises the use of metal tetrahedra in the staging, as "both simple and extremely adaptable" and describes Holloway as creating "some ingenious stage moments".

A 2002 reworking of Nicholas Nickleby (at the Gulbenkian Theatre, Canterbury) reset Dickens' tale in the 1950s, described as a "potentially very clever wheeze" by Lyn Gardner in The Guardian. The play focused on the conflict between the idealism of the young and the corruption of their elders. In the 2000s, Holloway also reworked classic films for the company including Get Carter and Vertigo. In 2009, he adapted Milton's Paradise Lost for the Edinburgh Festival, with Graeme Rose. In 2015, he adapted Robert Louis Stevenson's Jekyll and Hyde for a coproduction with the Hong Kong company Chung Ying, re-envisaging the titular doubled character as a traumatised woman.

In addition to The Late Show, the company was featured on Edinburgh Nights (BBC2) and Kaleidoscope (Radio 4). Red Shift first gained Arts Council funding in 1986, and the Arts Council funded the company between 1991 and 1997. In 2007 Holloway withdrew Red Shift from Arts Council RFO status. The limited company was dissolved in 2015.

== Other directing and later career ==
Holloway directed The Playboy of the Western World in Ireland and Le Misanthrope in Boston, USA, and he advised on the 2008 Gifford's Circus show Caravan. He has developed a series of open-air performances at festivals, under the title The Invisible Show.

In 2017 he began writing and directing a series of shows for Oxford's Creation Theatre Company including Nineteen Eighty-Four at the Mathematics Institute, Brave New World using projection screens and wi-fi headphones in the Westgate Shopping Centre, and in 2019 a re-imagining of Don Quixote in the Covered Market.

He was briefly Head of Performing Arts at Middlesex University and has taught at Brooklands Technical College (Weybridge), St Mary's University College and Royal Holloway University of London, and was Artist in Residence at Central School of Speech and Drama and Artistic Associate at Kingston University. Holloway served two years (2012–2014) on the Edinburgh Festival Fringe Participants' Council. He was an elected member of the Board of the Edinburgh Festival Fringe and the Advisory Panel of the National Campaign for the Arts.

He has made guest appearances on BBC Radio 4's A Good Read and appeared on a feature about the Arthur Mee Children's Encyclopaedia with the artist Grayson Perry.

== As a playwright ==
Scripts for Red Shift include The Double, In The Image of the Beast (Edinburgh Fringe First, 1987), The Hammer (also recorded for BBC Radio 3), Death in Venice, Crime And Punishment (also produced in Chile), Les Misérables (pub. Samuel French, also in rep in Hong Kong), The Aspern Papers, Nosferatu The Visitor, Nicholas Nickleby, The Man Who Was Thursday, the first stage versions of The Third Man, Get Carter, and Vertigo. His other theatre writing includes Darkness Falls for the Palace Theatre Watford, and Because It's There (2000), Angels Among The Trees (2004), and Vertigo (2008), all for Nottingham Playhouse.

Holloway has also written and directed many plays for BBC Radio, including adaptations of Citizen Kane, Strangers and Brothers, and Brave New World, the TV series The Man From Uncle, stories by George Eliot, Willa Cather, Walter de la Mare, Evelyn Waugh, Heinrich Boll, Leo Tolstoy and Andrew Motion, as well as Evelyn Waugh's The Loved One, Olivia Manning's Levant Trilogy, Goethe's Faust and Samuel Johnson's The History of Rasselas, Prince of Abissinia. He has written radio plays celebrating the George Orwell centenary, the 400th anniversary of Shakespeare's death and the Arthur Miller Centenary.
