= ATHEMOO =

1995 video game

ATHEMOO was a MOO created in 1995 by Juli Burk at the University of Hawaii, as an online performance and teaching space, for professionals and academics who were interested in theatre. A MOO is an online, text-based reality which is used for socialising or game playing. They are user-driven, with many people coming together to create new worlds out of text.

== History ==
ATHEMOO was developed in conjunction with the Association for Theatre in Higher Education (ATHE), and was designed originally under the auspices of providing a discussion space for people who were unable to attend conferences on the issues of performance theatre in the United States. Originally, ATHEMOO was designed so that all of the online open areas looked like a hotel lobby. At the time of ATHEMOO's establishment, there were over 2200 members of ATHE, half of whom were earning under $20,000 a year; it was therefore decided at the 1993 ATHE conference that ATHEMOO would be created to help all members discuss and learn from the ATHE conferences.

Although ATHEMOO was originally conceived as a discussion space, the creator realised its potential as a performative arena for the use and proliferation of online interactive performance. Audience members and any participants in a performance would be invited to visit the website at a time when the performance starts. Once the performance has started, the actors playing a role within the performance space in ATHEMOO exist both within the virtual and physical world, thus creating two simultaneous performances. In some cases, actors would meet in the physical world to rehearse work they would be performing in ATHEMOO.

== Notable performances ==
In its first year, ATHEMOO hosted numerous performances. In March 1996, Charles Deemer reproduced his hyperdrama, Bride of Edgefield, a play made entirely out of hypertext in the ATHEMOO space. Deemer is a playwright who has worked since 1991, creating five hyperplays. The second performer to use ATHEMOO as a performance space was Cat Hebert in March 1996, who produced a piece in conjunction with Crosswaves Festival in Philadelphia.

In late 1996, Stephen A. Schrum created a performance entitled NetSeduction. The piece was "set in an internet chat room and meeting place, with a bar, dance floor, and people to meet." This performance proved to be controversial with a moderator from ATHEMOO, who was concerned that the exchange of sexual dialogue might cause offence to audience members.

In 2000, Karen Wheatley produced an entirely online performance experience entitled Scheherezade's Daughters. The performers had never met in the physical world, but had exchanged ideas and rehearsed through email. The performers logged on and "performed" the play with dialogue typed out, and any movement or settings described in detail for audience members. Audience members were able to take part whenever they wanted to, either by registering to be an ATHEMOO character, or by emailing a member of the cast and requesting to temporarily perform one of the roles still in existence in the performance. This form of semi-improvisational performance allowed the audience to both watch and interact at the same time. This meant that while the performance had a set narrative which it would follow to start with, this could change completely depending on how much the audience interacted.

== Decline ==
ATHEMOO, as one of the first online, text-based performance arenas, demonstrated that the Internet is a receptive and interesting space for such performance. Its purpose was to discover how a MOO environment would develop around improvisational performance, and what improvisation would look like if it were viewed online. Like many MOOs in the 1990s, ATHEMOO was regularly affected by connection dropout, slow connection and lag. This regular disruption became part of the charm of ATHEMOO, and highlighted the risk inherent in any live performance event.

As 3D, virtual, avatar-based worlds, such as Second Life, became more popular ATHEMOO lost its appeal, and audience numbers declined, leading to its closure.
