= Antoinette LaFarge =

- Education: Harvard University; School of Visual Arts
- Known for: New media art

Antoinette LaFarge is a new media artist and writer known for her work with mixed-reality performance and projects exploring the conjunction of visual art and fiction.

== Biography ==
LaFarge received her M.F.A. degree in Computer Art from the School of Visual Arts, New York, in 1995, and her A.B. degree from Harvard University. She also briefly attended the San Francisco Arts Institute from 1980–1981 where she studied with Jim Pomeroy, Jack Fulton, and Robert Colescott. At Harvard University, her thesis was Proust and the Function of Metaphor.

She is the great-great-granddaughter of American artist John La Farge.

She has been a member of the College Arts Association since 1996 and was a member of SITE Gallery, Los Angeles from 1989 to 1991. She was Professor of Digital Media at the University of California, Irvine from 1999 to 2023, and she previously taught at the School of Visual Arts, New York, in the Computer Art M.F.A. program and in the Photography and Related Media M.F.A. program (1995–1999).

== Work ==
In 1994, LaFarge founded the Plaintext Players, an internet performance group that began creating original pieces early in the Web era. Initially, the Plaintext Players performed solely in text-based virtual environments such as MOOs, creating directed cyberformances or "netprovs" viewable by both online audiences and visitors in real spaces, where the performances were viewed as projections. These improvisatory works were a kind of "virtual vaudeville" in which boundaries between performers and viewers were fluid and unstable, allowing for highly kinetic and absurdist interactions. LaFarge served as the "Digital.Director" of many of these performances, directing them in real time. The first series, "Christmas" (1994–95), was followed by several others, including "LittleHamlet" (1995), "Gutter City" (1995), "The Candide Campaign" (1996), forming one of the most extensive oeuvres of early cyberspace performance.

Starting in the late 1990s, LaFarge and the Plaintext Players worked with theater director Robert Allen on several telematic mixed-reality performance works, including The Roman Forum (2000), The Roman Forum Project (2003), and Demotic (2004/2006). A recurrent theme in these works is the struggle of individuals to come to terms with the nexus of history, politics, mythmaking, and media. For instance, the two "Roman Forum" projects took a close look at contemporary presidential politics through the eyes of 2000-year-old citizens of the Roman empire, while Demotic examined the many voices that vie to be heard within the American polity. Demotic is summarized in Narrabase. LaFarge and Allen coined the term "media commedia" to describe their melding of political comedy with media-rich performance work.

Other performance works and installations by LaFarge include Reading Frankenstein (2003, with director Annie Loui), Playing the Rapture (2008, with Robert Allen), Hangmen Also Die (2010, with Robert Allen), Galileo in America (2011, with Robert Allen), and Far-Flung follows function (2012, with Ursula Endlicher and Robert Allen). Playing the Rapture spun off two related video installations that continued the original work's theme of conscious reflection on a game world in which two gamers are beta-testing a game about the Rapture. A recurrent theme in these works is the struggle of individuals to come to terms with the nexus of history, politics, mythmaking, and media. She has worked with performer-director Kim Weild, visual artist Adrianne Wortzel, sound artist Cuca Esteves, writer Aida Croal, and many other theater artists, performers, and programmers.

LaFarge also co-curated two very early U.S. exhibitions showcasing computer games: the 2000 show SHIFT-CTRL: Computers, Games, and Art and 2004's ALT+CTRL: A Festival of Independent and Alternative Games, the latter of which was supported by a grant from the National Endowment for the Arts. Both were produced by the Beall Center for Art + Technology at the University of California, Irvine. In her show catalog essay "WinSide Out", LaFarge traces how the historical links between art and games have become strengthened in the computer era by various forces that promoted "a culture of involvement on the part of players."

Another area of interest for LaFarge has been forgery, and in 1991 she founded the Museum of Forgery, a conceptual art project exploring the taboos around forgery.

LaFarge's writing ranges from essays on new media, performance, games, and fictive art to performance scripts and fiction. Since 1990, LaFarge has been an Associate of the Institute of Cultural Inquiry, a Los-Angeles-based nonprofit, for which she has designed several books, including Benjamin's Blind Spot (2001) and Bataille's Eye (1997).

== Selected publications ==
=== Books ===
- Experimental Practices in Interdisciplinary Art: Engaging the Margins. Brill, 2024. Co-edited with Jesse Colin Jackson.
- Sting in the Tail: Art, Hoax and Provocation. DoppelHouse Press, 2021.
- Louise Brigham and the Early History of Sustainable Furniture Design. Palgrave Macmillan, 2019.
- Monkey Encyclopedia W. ICI Press, 2019.

=== Essays ===
- "'Alive in the Now': Ekphrasis in Philip K. Dick and William Gibson." MOSF Journal of Science Fiction 2:1 (September 2017).
- "Pseudo Space: Experiments with Avatarism and Telematic Performance in Social Media." In Social Media Archeology and Poetics, Judy Malloy, ed. MIT Press, 2016.
- "Imposture as Improvisation: Living Fiction." In The Oxford Handbook of Critical Improvisation Studies, George Lewis and Ben Piekut, eds. Oxford University Press. 2013 (online); 2016 (print).
- "Social Proxies and Real-World Avatars: Impersonation as a Mode of Capitalist Production." Art Journal 73:4 (winter 2014).
- "Excerpts from Reading Frankenstein: Mary Shelley as 21st Century Artificial Life Scientist." With Annie Loui. Ada: A Journal of Gender, New Media & Technology, Fall 2013.
- "Eisbergfreistadt: The Fictive and the Sublime." Visual Communication Quarterly 16.4 (2009): 210-241.
- "All That Is Beyond Hearing: A Life of Arturo Ott." ICI Press: Searching for Sebald, 2007.
- "A Meditation on Virtual Kinesthesia." With Robert Allen. Extensions: The Online Journal for Embodied Technology, vol. 3 (spring 2007).
- "Media Commedia". With Robert Allen. Leonardo 38:3, 2005.
- "25 Propositions on the Art of Networlds." The Anthology of Art, ed. Jochen Gerz. Braunschweig School of Art, Germany (March 2002).
- "Marcel Duchamp and the Museum of Forgery." Tout-Fait: The Marcel Duchamp Studies Online Journal 2:4 (January 2002).
- "SHIFT-CTRL." With Robert Nideffer. Leonardo 35.1 (2002): 5-13.
- "WinSide Out: An Introduction to the Convergence of Computers, Games, and Art." Beall Center, University of California, Irvine, 2000.
- "The Bearded Lady and the Shaven Man: Mona Lisa, Meet Mona/Leo." Leonardo (1996).
- "A World Exhilarating and Wrong: Theatrical Improvisation on the Internet." Leonardo (1995).
- "Cylex". Wired 2:4 (1994).
