= Tomahawk Theatre Company =

Theater Company Based in Oxford

Tomahawk is a theatre company based in Oxford, South East England. Founded in 2005 by Alex Nicholls and Oliver Baird among others, experienced personnel work alongside young actors, directors and technicians, many of whom have gone on to train in London at the Royal Academy of Dramatic Art (RADA), London Academy of Music and Dramatic Art (LAMDA) and Mountview Academy of Theatre Arts.

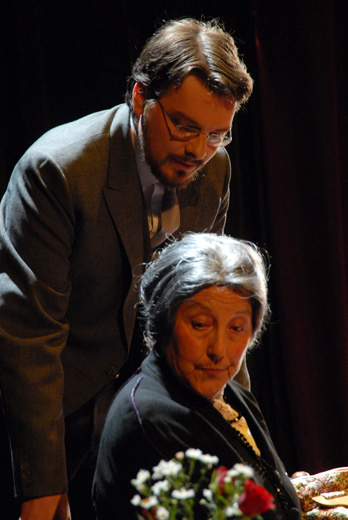
Alistair Nunn and Polly Mountain play George Tesman and Aunt Juju, June 2008

== Productions ==
- Macbeth (William Shakespeare) December 2005
- Little Eyolf (Henrik Ibsen) June 2006
- The Winter's Tale (William Shakespeare) December 2006
- The Importance of Being Earnest (Oscar Wilde) June 2007
- Much Ado About Nothing (William Shakespeare) December 2007
- Hedda Gabler (Henrik Ibsen) June 2008
- The Tempest (William Shakespeare) December 2008
- Gaslight (Patrick Hamilton) June 2009
- The Importance of Being Earnest (Oscar Wilde) December 2009
- Twelfth Night (William Shakespeare) June/July 2010
- Midsummer Nights Dream (William Shakespeare) June/July 2011
- Romeo and Juliet (William Shakespeare) June/July 2012
- Macbeth (William Shakespeare) June/July 2013
- Midsummer Nights Dream (William Shakespeare) July 2014
- Romeo and Juliet (William Shakespeare) July 2015
- Much Ado About Nothing (William Shakespeare) July 2016
- Romeo and Juliet (William Shakespeare) July 2017
- Midsummer Nights Dream (William Shakespeare) July 2018
- Macbeth (William Shakespeare) July 2019
- Romeo and Juliet (William Shakespeare) July 2023
- Twelfth Night (William Shakespeare) July 2024
- Much Ado About Nothing (William Shakespeare) July 2025
- Macbeth (William Shakespeare) July 2026

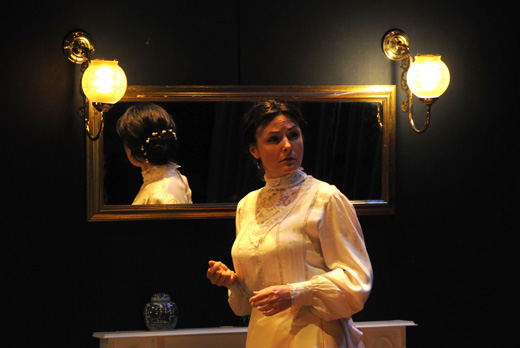
Susanne Sheehy plays Bella Manningham, June 2009

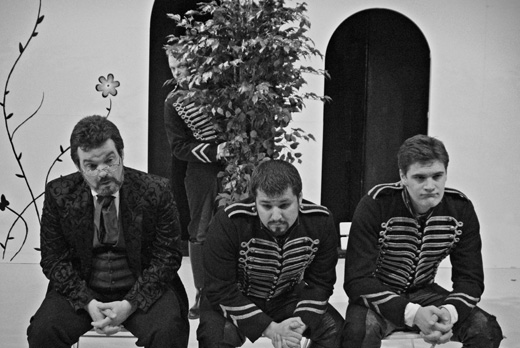
Joe Kenneway, Edward Blagrove, Tom Bateman and Alex Nicholls play Leonato, Don Pedro, Claudio and Benedick, Dec 2007

== Theatres ==
Tomahawk have performed at a number of local and regional theatres:

- The North Wall Arts Centre, Oxford
- The Kenton Theatre, Henley-on-Thames
- Burton Taylor Theatre, Oxford
- The Old Fire Station Studio, Oxford
- The Oxford Castle Courtyard
- Taganrog Chekhov Drama Theater, Taganrog, Russia

Tours include:

- Hedda Gabler - Westacre River Studios, Norfolk – June 2008
- The Tempest - Udine, Italy - February/March 2009
- The Importance of Being Earnest - Udine, Italy - February 2010
- The Importance of Being Earnest - Taganrog, Russia - May 2010
- Macbeth - Udine, Italy - April 2013
