= Theatre of Digital Art =

Art exhibition in Dubai

The Theatre of Digital Art (ToDA) is an exhibition space for digital art and a venue for digital theatre located at Souk Madinat in Jumeirah, Dubai, United Arab Emirates.

ToDA was announced in 2019, providing a 1,800 m^{2} immersive art space, with surround sound and large projection screens on the ceiling and all the walls. It opened its doors to the public in 2020. It provides a multimedia and multi-sensory exhibition space. ToDA exhibits work by digital artists around the world. It also hosts concerts.

ToDA enables three forms of digital art: contemporary immersive installation art, multimedia exhibitions, and virtual reality art. It includes digital displays of classical art, augmented with surround sound music and visual effects. The inaugural exhibition presented the artworks of nine artists, including works by Paul Cézanne, Wassily Kandinsky, Claude Monet, Vincent van Gogh, etc.

The theatre also houses an interactive exhibition for children, which represents a specialised artistic space characterised by multi-dimensional spaces with secret passages and gates that provide access to magical worlds full of mystery. Visitors to the theatre can enter this space for free.

== See also ==
- Digital art
- Digital performance
- Digital theatre
