= Plaintext Players =

The Plaintext Players were an online performance group founded by Antoinette LaFarge in 1994. Consisting mainly of artists and writers, they engaged in improvisational cyberformance on MOOs and later branched out into mixed reality performance, working with stage actors. Their performances form a "hybrid of theatre, fiction and poetry".

== Overview ==
When the Plaintext Players began their journey into the world of cyberformance, they worked primarily in the text-based online environments known as MOOs. LaFarge would devise a detailed scenario which would be communicated to the actors or "participants" beforehand. The pieces would then be constructed through live improvisation under LaFarge's direction. Two early examples of this were their "Gutter City" (1995) and "LittleHamlet" (1995). In "Gutter City," they told the tale of what happened to Ishmael, from Moby-Dick, when he became involved in the Civil War after his rescue; and in "LittleHamlet" they retold the story of Shakespeare's Hamlet but attempted to show "all of the characters' formerly unspoken needs, fears, and desires."

Starting in 1998, in collaboration with theater director Robert Allen, they began bridging between virtual and real spaces, bringing theater actors to work with the online material in various ways. Initially, LaFarge adapted online transcripts for stage and radio performance; the first of these was "Still Lies Quiet Truth", a 1998 adaptation of the 1996 online series known as "The Candide Campaign" that was performed at the New York International Fringe Festival. Locations from the characters' virtual world were projected on screen in synch with the performance, showing where the characters were at any given moment. After this, the Players began experimenting with performances in which live feeds allowed the online performers to improvise in real time with the stage actors. These live feeds ranged from text projections to audio synthesized from text, and the stage actors responded to these feeds in various ways. In addition, all of the information being circulated between the online and stage performers in the form of audio, video, and text streams was subject to further transformations through computer programming. The Plaintext Players' departure from purely text-based performance was enabled by the growing availability of multimedia technologies, and in line with their aesthetic of mediated improvisation. As a group they have been largely inactive since 2006, although individual members have continued cyberformance in other venues.

Founding members of the Plaintext Players include Ursula Endlicher, Joe Ferrari, Heather Wagner, Thessy Mehrain, and Adrianne Wortzel. Other members who appeared in multiple performance series include Lise Patt, Marlena Corcoran, Cathy Caplan, Richard Foerstl, and Richard Smoley.

== Performance history ==
- "Christmas" (1994)
- "LittleHamlet" (1995)
- "Gutter City" (1995)
- "The Candide Campaign" (1996)
- "The White Whale" (1997)
- "Orpheus" (1997)
- "Silent Orpheus" (1997)
- "Still Lies Quiet Truth" (1998)
- "Birth of the Christ Child" (1999)
- "The Roman Forum" (2000)
- "Virtual Live" (2002)
- "The Roman Forum Project" (2003)
- "Demotic" (2004/2006)
