= Forkbeard Fantasy =

British multimedia arts company

Forkbeard Fantasy is a British multimedia arts company, based in Devon. It began as an experimental performance art group in 1974, founded by brothers Chris and Tim Britton.

Between 1974 and 2010 it made touring theatre productions, largely performed by Chris and Tim. In 1979, they were joined by Penny Saunders, a designer and maker, who went on to create most of Forkbeard's extravagant costumes and props. In the late 1980s they were also joined by Ed Jobling who became a core cast member and the company's technical wizard. Forkbeard continued to create interactive exhibitions, specially commissioned exhibits, short animation films as well performing one-off 'Brittonioni' shows and getting involved in a wide range of community based events until finally dissolving the company in 2024. Lyn Gardner, reviewing The Colour of Nonsense (2010) in The Guardian, described the company as long having had a "mixture of madness and creativity".

== Touring theatre productions ==
- The Rubber God Show, 1975
- The Government Warning Show, 1976
- Men Only, 1977
- The Cranium Show, 1978
- On An Uncertain Insect, 1979
- The Clone Show, 1980
- Springtime, 1982
- The Brontosaurus Show, 1983
- Plants, Vampires and Crazy Kings 1985
- Myth, 1986
- Hypochondria, 1987
- A Serious Leak, 1989
- Invasion of the Bloopies, 1991
- The Little Match Girl, 1994
- The Fall of the House of Usherettes, 1995,
- The Barbers of Surreal, 1998
- The Brain, 1999
- Yallery Brown, 2000 – with Sean Aita
- Frankenstein: a Truly Monstrous Experiment, 2001
- Shooting Shakespeare, 2004
- Rough Magyck, 2006
- Invisible Bonfires, 2007
- The Colour of Nonsense, 2010
