= Alexander Parsonage (theatre director) =

English theatre director

- Born: 26 February 1980 (age 45); London
- Occupation: Theatre director
- Website: http://www.alexparsonage.com

Alexander Parsonage (born 26 February 1980) is an English theatre director. He was nominated for a Total Theatre Award in 2009 as well as winning the Fringe Report Award for Best Artistic Director (Finger in the Pie) in 2012.

== Biography ==
=== Early life ===
Parsonage was born in London, England. His father, Antony Cleary, is a British Historian and academic. His mother, Brenda Parsonage, was a British teacher and gymnastics instructor. Parsonage studied Philosophy and Politics at Warwick University and then trained for the theatre at the London International School of Performing Arts in London.

=== Career ===
Parsonage is a founder and artistic director of the UK-based theatre company Finger in the Pie. Productions by Finger in the Pie which Parsonage has directed include Vote, Vote, Vote for Nigel Barton (2005), Cenerentola (2007), The Snow Queen (2008) and Red Hot Riding Hood (2008). Sweeney Todd: His Life, Times and Execution! (2009) a devised piece conceived and directed by Parsonage, which conceived of Todd as a silent "clown in the tradition of Buster Keaton" played at Jacksons Lane in Spring 2009 and toured to the Edinburgh Fringe Festival. Sweeney Todd: His Life, Times and Execution! was nominated for a Total Theatre Award for 'Best Emerging Artist/Company 2009'.

Parsonage is also an established cabaret promoter: he has been running Finger in the Pie Cabaret Showcase in London's Madame Jojo's since February 2006. The event is listed as being 'London's largest showcase of new Variety, Vaudeville and Burlesque' In 2008 Finger in the Pie Cabaret was included in Time Out's guide to 'London's Rising Talent'.

=== Festivals ===
Parsonage is currently the artistic director of the international festival of mime, puppetry and cabaret, Mimetic, based in the Millfield Theatre, in north London.

Whilst at the University of Warwick Parsonage founded the Warwick Student Art Festival Held in 2002 it included a campus wide programme of performance and art including installation, painting, sculpture, live art and theatre. The festival went on to develop into a campus wide multi-arts event, called the Warwick Student Arts Festival (WSAF). In 2004 it was reported by the BBC as being the "Largest student arts festival in Europe".

Parsonage is also the co-founder of the London Alternative Fringe Festival (LAFF) with Imogen Thomas of Driftwood Media. In 2009 the festival hosted eight productions occurring in eleven london venues including: Volupté Lounge, Madame Jojo's, Hackney Empire Marie Lloyd Bar, The Canal Café, Last Days of Decadence, Leicester Square Basement.
