= Fringe Report =

Defunct British online magazine

Fringe Report was an online magazine relating to contemporary fringe theatre published in the United Kingdom. Fringe Report publishes two or three times a week on London performances as well as regional performances in the United Kingdom. It was started 2002 and ended publication in 2012.

== Fringe Report Awards ==
The annual awards were held in London with the winners announced on the last Friday of January. There were 25 awards for performing arts in the UK, Europe and Internationally. There was also one film related award. The awards were founded by John Park. The 2009 Awards were held at the newly revamped Leicester Square Theatre in London's West End.
