= Digital performance =

Digital Performance refers to the use of computers as an interface between a creator, consumer of images, and sounds in a wide range of artistic applications. It is performance that incorporates and integrates computer technologies and techniques. Performers can incorporate multimedia into any type of production whether it is live on a theatre stage, or in the street. Anything as small as video recordings or a visual image classifies the production as multimedia. When the key role in a performance is the technology, it is considered a digital performance. This can be as simple as making projections on a screen for a live audience or as complex as planning and putting on a show online.

== Introduction ==
The integration of technology can increase the effects, spectacles and impact of performances and visual arts. Incorporating multimedia in productions surprises the audience and keeps them engaged. The larger social impact after the performance includes interpretations from diverse groups of people.

The Digital Performance Archive stores a physical and catalogued archives from the 20th century. Its research project involved the increase and creative use of computer technology, techniques within live theatre and dance productions and cyberspace interactive dramas and webcasts. Looking at a broad range of diverse productions would have enhanced their research project as they saw how each type of performance was affected and even how new types of performance came about due to the involvement of computer technologies and techniques and all other multimedia sources. In the 20th century, emerging forms of drama and genres of performance reflected the active and escalating role of computer technology in society, with businesses and education treating computers as essential. As our society became more reliant on computers in everyday life, artists began relying on computer technology to play a significant role in film as well as live theatre.

CD-ROMs, video games and installations raised the level of interactive potential of computers. Their accessibility and sophistication added those very aspects to performances that used advanced technology.

From the first digital performance to present day, artists have followed each other's works and explored trends. Technology has its own trends and upgrades, which appeal to artists in the field. Online environments are a strong base for theoretical trends as the frameworks are similar and sometimes the same.

The largest platform for theatre in the world is the World Wide Web. The Internet is seen as a satisfying place for relaxation and offers everyone who uses the Internet their ‘fifteen megabytes of fame.' Every single person who uses online networking sites, blogs, chat rooms, MOOs and IRC is creating their own performance with the use of e-friendships. Therefore it is not just the artists who deliberately devise theatrical events via the use of computer techniques and technologies. However, the focus of this article is on artistic performance.

The field of Digital Performance generates a wide variety of visual and stylistic aspects. Computers allow the artists or companies to create extraordinary and unique experiences, such as virtual realities.

Many consider the relationship between technology and art stimulating, thought-provoking and complementary.‘Performance is undertaking a shift in the conception of technology’. As the educational curriculum also upgrades with the latest technologies, students who are 'digital natives' make use of technology and find it effective in connecting with a broad cross-section of audiences.

Performers and devisers of digital performance productions have to approach the aspects of technology in diverse ways to be able to reach different meanings, content, drama, the impact of visuals and the audience-performer relationship. The computer is seen as the middleman, who fixes lasting problems rather than creating original and new performance processes and hype, in digital performance.

== History ==
The term digital performance can usually be defined to consist of all types of performance in which computer technologies have taken on the main role rather than an auxiliary one in the content, techniques, aesthetics or the delivery forms. Digital performance will usually explore the representations of the subliminal, dreams, and fantasy worlds.

The pace of technological development is becoming increasingly significant and exponential. As a result of this, there has been a large increase in the experimentation with computer technologies being integrated within the performing arts; And thanks to new technologies, developments in existing ones, and greater portability and user-friendliness, there is a more significant impact on the way in which the various art forms are practised. Digital media now has a new and much more dramatic role to play in live theatre, dance and performance; and while digital media performances are now beginning to proliferate there are now many new forms of interactive performance genres that have emerged. These new genres are most commonly in the style of audience participatory installation pieces that can take place either on the internet or can be played on a CD – ROM. “Computers are arenas for social experience and dramatic interaction, a type of media more like public theatre, and their output is used for qualitative interaction, dialogue and conversation.” The computer is vastly becoming a significant tool and agent of performative action and creation. Computer technologies can be contextualised as being of a social, cultural and artistic change. Computers do now permit for the artistic modes of expression and for the new generic forms of networking and interactive performance. Theatre itself has always been right at the cutting edge of technology and it has been quick on the mark to be able to recognise, and to take full advantage of the dramatic and aesthetic potentials that these new and existing technologies have to offer. Theatre, dance and performance art have always been known to be a form of multimedia; and right at the very core of the theatre through all the manifestations right to the contemporary experimentation, as well as incorporating all of the visual elements into a production; at the foreground to any piece there is the human voice and the spoken text.

Locating the roots of digital performance practices can be traced back for many decades or even centuries. There are three main periods that can be highlighted in the history of multi - media performance: Futurism during the 1910s, mixed media performance during the 1960s and experimentation with a performance and the computer during the 1990s. Both during the eras of Futurism and the experimentation with computer incorporated within performance, they are both greatly inspired by the development of new and existing technology. Researching back, digital performance practices have experimented with numerous of the different avant – garde movements which can date right back from the early twentieth century, some of these movements can include the likes of Bauhaus, Dada, Surrealism and many more. It could be said that digital performance can be linked to the aesthetics, philosophies and practices of the futurist movement. One of the main links that has been found which can connect futurism to digital performance was with the use of the ‘machine’ which was used in the set of Robert Lepage’s Zulu Time (1999). Although, it can be said that the avant – garde movement Futurism does have a more philosophical basis for contemporary digital performance, more so than any of the other avant – garde movements such as the likes of Bauhaus, Dada and Surrealism which are mainly used to provide inspiration for a large part of the content and styles for the artistic expression. Looking back at the early twentieth century avant – garde, there were many works that would use pre – digital technologies.

One of the earliest examples of when theatre and film were being integrated together in a performance, with the use of digital technology was to try to challenge the distinction between what is ‘liveness’ as in the live performer on the stage and the media imagery, it is about the relationship between the virtual and the actual performance being the dialogical interactivity. With the increased usage of digital media in a performance, not all performances are necessarily live; without the body's physical presence it could be argued whether this is this still live theatre or just a set of media images and footage. Theatre pieces which have integrated digital media and computer-generated projections built into performances have a long historical lineage that stretches back to over a hundred years ago to an experiment that was conducted by Loie Fuller. Fuller was the first modern dance choreographer to try out and to use new technology within her performance work. In 1911, Fuller, a dancer, conducted an experiment where she used film footage and projected it onto diaphanous robes. In the performance, as Fuller danced the robes in which she was wearing became a sort of ‘screen’ where multi – coloured lights were projected upon it. This was one of the first pieces of theatre where film footage was integrated into becoming a part of a live theatre performance.

From the early 1960s, computer-generated imagery had then begun to emerge as a distinctive art form, and in John Whitney's film Catalog (1961) viewers witnessed one of films’ first ever uses of computer transformations. Although digital arts had been developing since the 1960s, in the 1990s computer technologies had become much more accessible to artists which then led to a large increase in the digital performance activity. It was during this time that computer hardware was built to become much more “user – friendly” and we then witnessed the invention of the digital camera and the home PC's (Personal Computer) and the establishment of the World Wide Web. It was during this period of time which would then go on to be known as being the ‘Digital Revolution’. During the period of the ‘Digital Revolution’ there was a great influence on the aesthetics, creation and culture of the performance arts; this had a significant effect on the process for film and television production to the creative writing and the visual and performance arts.

From 1970 there was a period of time of when theatrical experimentation elevated the visual over the verbal; there was a proliferation in the use of media projections in theatre, dance and performance art, using both screens and video monitors. With the ease of using these video technologies more and more artists began to play around with the possibilities of integrating visual media within their live performance work. The use of media technology including the likes of film, video and sound equipment became some of the main characteristics for the experimental theatre, and some of the most noted performance artists of this time were creating work by incorporating video and film footage into their theatre productions. By the 1990s multimedia and computer technologies had widely become a part of everyday life. In live multimedia theatre: the projection screens or video monitor frame additional space, in two dimensions. Media screens are able to provide a uniquely flexible space, unlike the fixed point of view in which a traditional theatre provides to the members of the audience. Moving towards the end of the twentieth century digital computer technologies have become increasingly more ubiquitous.

As digital media has now become more and more popular over the years, the perception of digital images and videos now are now lacking in legitimacy as these technologies have gradually intensified over the past few years. Digital performance is an expansion of a constantly progressing history of which embracing the adaptation of these new and already existing technologies, in which to amplify a performance and the visual art aesthetic effect, and to create the sense of a spectacle as well as capturing the emotional and the sensorial impact.

== Production examples ==
Video conferencing is also a part of digital performance, some theatre companies (such as ‘The Gertrude Stein Repertory Theatre’ and ‘Kunstwerk-Blend’) introduced this into their productions to bring different performers from different locations together live on stage to create a lively new brand of digital performance. The Internet is used as a base for these productions with text-based online environments such as MUDs and MOOs as well as the use of webcams and webcasts. They all created new forms to come under the live and interactive performance area. With the ongoing increase of internet users and with more and more people are made accessible to these software's therefore more and more artists are experimenting and devising performances using computer technologies which them branches out and raises the number of digital performances and productions.

Another case of what is under the title of digital performance is dance productions, using software and computer techniques such as advanced animation and motion capturing. Productions can project images of virtual dancers made on to the stage. Software that is highly involved with digital performance is custom-made motion sensing; this software can be used to control images, avatars, sounds and lighting live on stage.

Communication through the Internet has been classed as a type of digital performance as it has been theorized as a type of virtual performance of the self. As this is so, people have already stated digital performance as being everywhere, which has led to digital performance being modernized itself. It has been noted as incorporating the elements of electronics in everyday life through the communicational and production elements.

Some strands of performing have always been seen as multimedia forms such as theatre, dance and performance art. Dance involves an intimate relationship with music for a start. All three of the above are involved with visual aspects such as sets, props, lighting and costume which are all a part of the production to enhance the body/bodies in a space. Using such aspects makes the performance become multimedia and that is becoming more advanced with the new techniques that computers are upgrading to therefore making digital performance a strong and popular area to study.

With the effects on the ongoing COVID 19 pandemic, artists have been experimenting with online/digital theatre, for example The Coronalogues (2021) featuring works from directors across the world Ken Kwek and Dick Lee.

== See also ==
- Digital art
- Digital theatre
- Theatre of Digital Art (ToDA), Duabi, UAE
