= Ursula Endlicher =

Austrian artist

- Born: Vienna, Austria
- Education: Academy of Fine Arts Vienna (1991); School of Visual Arts (1993)
- Website: Official website

Ursula Endlicher is a New York City based Austrian multi-media artist who creates works in the fields of internet art, performance art and installation art.

== Life and education ==
Ursula Endlicher was born in Vienna, Austria. She received her Master of Fine Arts from the Academy of Fine Arts Vienna in 1991. She relocated permanently to New York City in 1993. In 1995, she received a Master of Fine Arts, with an emphasis in computer art, from the School of Visual Arts in New York City.

== Work ==
Endlicher has created technology-based performances and installations that use live Internet data. A recurring theme in her work is the "nature" of the web and the behavior of its users, addressed through exploitation of the Internet’s inherent architecture, the web’s HTML language, and user behavior on social media sites. Endlicher’s earliest Internet artwork was presented at the Thing's Vienna bulletin board in 1994. Her internet art works have been since been commissioned for the Whitney Museum’s artport (Light and Dark Networks, 2012; Famous for One Spam, 2004) and for New Radio and Performing Arts Inc.’s Turbulence.org website (html_butoh).

Two of her projects—the performance series Website Impersonations: The Ten Most Visited and html_butoh—use HTML code as the basis of a movement language. That is, HTML (and later XML) tags are translated into a set of dance movements, thus making the web code visible and physical. Endlicher writes, "I first had the idea to 'perform' HTML in 2006, when I discovered a parallel between HTML tags (the language the Web is written in) and Butoh (a Japanese dance technique, which is based on 'becoming an image' in the performance)." In html_butoh these movements are recodified into a database of small video clips. Website Impersonations has been hosted at SIGGRAPH, the Center for Performance Research, Light Industry, and elsewhere.

Endlicher has also physicalized the web through her project Website Wigs, a collection of wigs whose structure replicates the sitemap of websites belonging to Apple, Google, Intel, Microsoft, and other entities of the digital era. The sites' hyperlinks are represented through braiding, beading, and color banding, resulting in a three-dimensional form of data visualization.

Endlicher's performances have been hosted in festivals such as transmediale, SIGGRAPH, and ZERO1 Biennial, as well as at galleries and museums such as Postmasters Gallery (New York), Jersey City Museum (New Jersey), Beral Madra Contemporary Art (Istanbul, Turkey), and the Center for Contemporary Art, Ujazdów Castle (Warsaw, Poland). She has collaborated on several occasions with other artists, including Ela Kagel (with whom she ran the blog curating netart from 2006 to 2009), Anke Zimmermann, Annie Abrahams, and the Plaintext Players. Her work is in the collections of the Whitney Museum of American Art, the Rhizome Artbase, and the Rose Goldsen Archive of New Media Art at Cornell University.
