= Digital theatre =

Integration of theatre with technology

Digital theatre (or digital performance) designates live theatrical practices that use digital media and digital technology as a central element of the artistic event. Digital theatre can include live performances that integrate projection, sensors, live video, video mapping, telematic links, augmented reality or virtual reality and interactive interfaces where digital systems shape the audience experience.

The phrase has also been used by companies such as Evans and Sutherland to refer to their fulldome projection technology products.

== Description ==
Digital theatre is a hybrid form of performance that merges live, co-present performers and audiences with digital media in a single, uninterrupted space. Although some elements may be streamed or remotely executed, this kind of theatre emphasises the simultaneous presence of live action and digital-mediated elements.

In this model, the production typically maintains some of the recognisable structural features of conventional theatre, such as spoken language or textual narrative, while incorporating digital technologies not as mere support or set pieces but as integral to the primary artistic narrative event.

Rather than full interactivity or immersive gaming-style theatre engagement, digital theatre often limits audience interaction so that the artistic team retains creative control of the narrative and dramatic form. As a result, there are four major categories to help define digital theatre:

1. A live performance in which at least some performers and the audience share the same physical space.
2. The central use of digital technology (e.g., projection, motion capture, VR/AR, live video) as essential to the performance’s aesthetic and meaning.
3. Controlled or limited audience interactivity, in contrast to open participatory performance models.
4. The piece features a narrative element conveyed through text, speech or recordings, but may also express narrative through the inclusion of music, dance and installation components.

However, these categories may be subverted or expanded as contemporary theatre makers increasingly blur the boundaries between aesthetic forms, eschewing the formal constraints that characterised earlier traditions such as the classical Aristotelian model of drama.

== See also ==
- Digital performance
- Theatre of Digital Art, Dubai

== Additional resources ==
- Sheizaf Rafaeli, "Interactivity, From New Media to Communication," pages 110-34 in Advanced Communicational Science: Merging Mass and Interpersonal Processes, ed. Robert P. Hawkins, John M. Wiemann, and Suzanne Pingree [Newbury Park: Sage Publications, 1988] 111).
- Multimedia: From Wagner to Virtual Reality, ed. Randall Packer and Ken Jordan;
- Telepresence and Bio Art, by Eduardo Kac
- Virtual Theatres: An Introduction, by Gabriella Giannachi (London and New York: Routledge, 2004).
- Geigel, J. and Schweppe, M., What's the Buzz?: A Theatrical Performance in Virtual Space, in Advancing Computing and Information Sciences, Reznik, L., ed., Cary Graphics Arts Press, Rochester, NY, 2005, pp. 109–116.
- Schweppe, M. and Geigel, J., 2009. "Teaching Graphics in the Context of Theatre", Eurographics 2009 Educators Program (Munich, Germany, March 30-April 1, 2009)
