= Adrianne Wortzel =

American contemporary artist

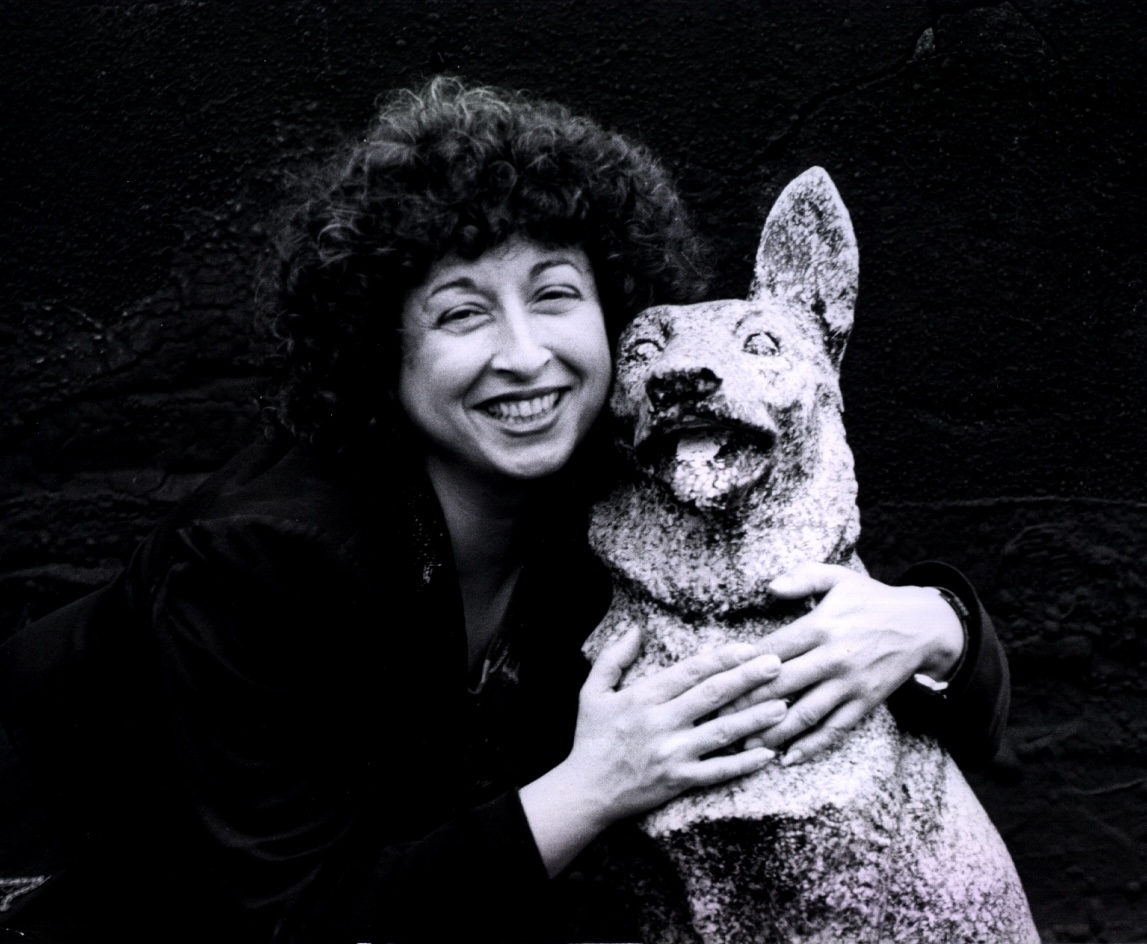
- Born: October 7, 1941 (age 85)
- Education: The Brooklyn Museum Art School, Brooklyn College, The School of Visual Arts, Hunter College,
- Known for: Media Art, Telerobotics, Robotics and Theater
- Notable work: Camouflagetown, The Electronic Chronicles, Battle of the Pyramids, NoMad is an Island, The Ships Detective, The Hidden Archivists at the Anchorage, Veils of Transference, Tableaux Vivant Dans Un Monde Parfait, ELIZA REDUX
- Website: https://adriannewortzel.com

Adrianne Wortzel is a pioneering media artist based in New York City. Since the 1990s, her work has integrated robotics into performance art, installation, and electronic literature in order to examine technology's impact on both quotidian experiences and broader society. Throughout six decades, she has remained an innovator in experimental media art, playfully, and critically exploring the presence of technology in everyday life.

== Early life and education ==
Wortzel was born in Brooklyn, New York, in 1941. As a child, she was impacted by four abstract murals in the basement community rooms of the Willamsburg Houses where she lived. The murals, by Albert Swinden, Balcomb Greene, Paul Kelpe, and Ilya Bolotowsky, were commissioned 1936–1938 by the painter Burgoyne Diller as Director of the Works Progress Administration Federal Art Project. Covered over by paint and rubber cement in subsequent years, these works were rediscovered, restored and now live in permanent installation at the Brooklyn Museum.

Between 1956 and 1963, Wortzel studied at the Brooklyn Museum Art School, where she was mentored by artists including Isaac Soyer, Reuben Tam, Tom Doyle, and Reuben Kadish. Working extensively from live models and still life, she developed foundational skills in drawing, painting and sculpture. Soon after, she enrolled at Brooklyn College of the City University of New York, initially majoring in English, but going on to study painting with Ad Reinhardt, Jimmy Ernst, Louise Bourgeois. She graduated in 1963 with a Bachelor of Arts in Fine Arts and departmental honors.

She later continued her education at The School of Visual Arts enrolling in its Computer Arts Program - the first MFA program in the United States dedicated to Computer Arts. She earned her Master of Fine Arts in Computer Arts in 1996. During this period, she began working with emerging digital technologies, including code-driven robots and networked systems, marking a significant expansion of her artistic practice into time-based, interactive, and technologically driven artforms.

== Career ==
From 1995 to 2015 Wortzel taught interdisciplinary design and engineering courses, combining art and technology. She taught at the School of Visual Arts, the Graduate Film Department at NYU and at The Cooper Union in New York City in both the Art and Engineering Schools. As of 2015, she is a professor emerita in the Departments of Entertainment Technology and Emerging Media Technologies at the New York City College of Technology; teaching there as a Professor from 1998 to 2015. In 2000, she founded StudioBlueLab, (first called the Robotic Renaissance Project,nfunded by the National Science Foundation; an award where she was a co-principal investigator).

Much of Wortzel's early career was as an abstract painter, and was featured in exhibitions, including The Moderna Museet in Stockholm, the New York State Museum, Stamford Museum and Nature Center in Connecticut, the American Embassy in Cairo, the Scottsdale Center for the Arts, the Islip Museum, Bergen Museum of Art and Science, Albright Knox Museum, Cleveland Center for Contemporary Art. She began working with robotics and telerobotics as she pursued her MFA in Computer Art, also producing early web and hypertext works, video and installation work, exhibited online and in physical venues such as Ars Electronica (Linz), Berlin Videofest, MIT List Visual Arts Center, Sandra Gering Gallery (NY,) Creative Time-Art in the Anchorage, Arreale-Art in the Industrial Zone (Germany) and the Abrons Art Center (NY).

Wortzel has earned several grants and awards in the course of her work, including the National Science Foundation Award for the Robotic Renaissance Project. She has also had her work featured in many art publications, including Margret Lovejoy's Digital Current: Art in the Electronic Age and Frank Popper's From Technological to Virtual Art, and has been published in major art journals, including Leonardo in 2007. Wortzel was an Eyebeam Resident in 2008.

=== Installations ===
Her 2001 installation Camouflage Town was included in the group exhibition Data Dynamics at the Whitney Museum of American Art, where a robot named Kiru was allowed to inhabit the space of the museum and interact with museum visitors both directly and remotely. Her Gate Page for Eliza Redux, was launched on ARTPORT onn the Whitney Museum's website in 2005. Eliza Redux was an installation which took Joseph Weizenbaum's artificial intelligence program ELIZA program and embodied it in three physical robot's forms installed at StudioBlue at New York City College of Technology in Brooklyn. Participants interacted with the robot through online sessions. The Holden Luntz Gallery has an on-line exhibition of her work. Other installations included:

- NoMad is an Island, installation, Linz, Austria, 1997
- Kiku, 2001 is a networked robot installation with a website, computers, and video camera, where the viewer interacts with a robot.
- Battle of the Pyramids, installation, Eyebeam Atelier, 2008 uses 21 toys as a miniature battalion. Elmo becomes a soldier.
- Camouflage Town, installation, The Whitney Museum of American Art, 2010
- The Veils of Transference, video, 2010
- Solace and Perpetuity is a book project based on Wortzel's 1994 The Electronic Chronicles.

=== Electronic literature works ===
- The Electronic Chronicles, in Riding the Meridian, 1997 (restored in 2019). N. Katherine Hayles describes this work as an open work that uses the metaphor of fort-da game to infuse novel semantic strategies into hypertext linking. This work was part of Wortzel's MFA in computer art in 1995.
- Eliza Redux, installation, New York City College of Technology, 2008. Wortzel revisioned the 1960s program ELIZA to include graphics, robotics, and expanding vocabulary.
- Solace and Perpetuity, algorithmically derived fictionalized autobiography, 2016
