= List of video game industry people =

Below is a list of notable people who work or have worked in the video game industry.

The list is divided into different roles, but some people fit into more than one category. For example, Sid Meier is both a game designer and programmer. In these cases, the people appear in both sections.

== Art and animation ==
- Dennis Hwang: graphic designer working for Niantic
- Edmund McMillen: artist whose art style is synonymous with Flash games
- Jordan Mechner: introduced realistic movement to video games with Prince of Persia
- Jim Sachs: created new standard for quality of art with the release of the Amiga game Defender of the Crown
- Yoji Shinkawa: art director, character designer, and prop designer. Known for working on the Metal Gear series.
- Derek Yu: Indie video game artist, designer, and blogger. Known for working on Spelunky, Spelunky 2, Aquaria, Eternal Daughter, I'm O.K – A Murder Simulator, DRL, and UFO 50

== Company officers ==
- J Allard: Xbox Officer President
- David Baszucki: founder and CEO of the Roblox Corporation
- Marc Blank: co-founder of Infocom
- Cliff Bleszinski: founder of Boss Key Productions
- Steve Boom: vice president of Twitch Interactive and Amazon Games
- Doug Bowser: president of Nintendo of America (2019–2025)
- Arjan Brussee: co-founder of Guerrilla Games & Boss Key Productions
- Jon Burton: founder of Traveller's Tales and its parent company TT Games
- Nolan Bushnell: founder of Atari, Inc.
- David Cage: founder of Quantic Dream
- Doug Carlston: co-founder of Broderbund
- Trevor Chan: founder and CEO of Enlight Software
- Adrian Chmielarz: founder of Metropolis Software, People Can Fly, and The Astronauts
- Dan Clancy: CEO of Twitch Interactive (2019-present)
- Raphaël Colantonio: founder of Arkane Studios
- Josef Fares: founder of Hazelight Studios
- Reggie Fils-Aimé: former president of Nintendo of America (2006–2019)
- Greg Fischbach: CEO of Acclaim Entertainment before it bankrupted
- Jack Friedman: Founder of Jakks Pacific, LJN, and THQ
- Ed Fries: former president of game publishing at Microsoft (1990s–2004)
- Andy Gavin & Jason Rubin: founders of Naughty Dog
- David Gordon: founder of Programma International
- Yves Guillemot: co-founder and CEO of Ubisoft
- Shuntaro Furukawa: President of Nintendo (2018–present)
- Hal Halpin: President of ECA
- John Hanke: founder and CEO of Niantic
- Cai Haoyu: founder and former chairman of miHoYo
- Trip Hawkins: founder of Electronic Arts
- Akihiro Hino: founder and CEO of Level-5
- Sam Houser: co-founder and President of Rockstar Games
- Jensen Huang, Chris Malachowsky, & Curtis Priem: founders of Nvidia
- Ma Huateng: co-founder and CEO of Tencent
- Atsushi Inaba, Hideki Kamiya, Shinji Mikami, & Tatsuya Minami: founders of PlatinumGames
- Tsunekazu Ishihara: CEO of The Pokémon Company
- Tomonobu Itagaki: Founder of Team Ninja & Valhalla Game Studios
- Satoru Iwata: Former President of Nintendo (2002–2015)
- Jennell Jaquays: started the game design unit at Coleco
- Alexandre Julliard: CTO of CodeWeavers
- Justin Kan, Michael Seibel, Emmett Shear, & Kyle Vogt: founders of the live video platforms Justin.tv and Twitch
- Sampo Karjalainen: Founder of Sulake
- Tatsumi Kimishima: Former President of Nintendo (2015–2018)
- Michael Kogan: founder of Taito
- Hideo Kojima: founder and director of Kojima Productions
- Bobby Kotick: former CEO of Activision Blizzard (2008-2023)
- Kagemasa Kōzuki: founder of Konami
- Colette Kress: CFO of Nvidia
- Ken Kutaragi: Former President of Sony Computer Entertainment, Inc. (1997 - 2007)
- Doug Lowenstein: founder and former President of the Entertainment Software Association
- Hiroshi Matsuyama: CEO of CyberConnect2
- Masafumi Miyamoto: founder of Square
- Shigeru Miyamoto: Representative Director of Nintendo
- Hidetaka Miyazaki: President of FromSoftware, creator of the Dark Souls series
- Peter Moore: COO at Electronic Arts
- Peter Molyneux: founder of Lionhead Studios, co-founder of Bullfrog Productions
- Michael Morhaime: co-founder and former president of Blizzard Entertainment
- Masaya Nakamura: founder of Namco
- Gabe Newell: founder and president of Valve Corporation
- Jay Obernolte: founder of FarSight Studios
- Philip & Andrew Oliver: co-founders of Blitz Games; twins
- Scott Orr: founder of GameStar, Glu Mobile
- Mark Papermaster: CTO of AMD
- Mark Pincus & Justin Waldron: founders of Zynga
- Randy Pitchford: CEO of Gearbox Software
- Ted Price: President of Insomniac Games
- Devon Pritchard: president of Nintendo of America (2025-present)
- Paul Reiche III & Fred Ford: founders of Toys for Bob
- John Riccitiello: former CEO of Unity Technologies (2014-2023)
- Warren Robinett: Founder of The Learning Company
- John Romero: co-founded at least seven game companies: Capitol Ideas Software, Inside Out Software, Ideas from the Deep, id Software, Ion Storm, Monkeystone Games, and Gazillion Entertainment
- Bonnie Ross: Founder and former vice-president of 343 Industries (2007-2022)
- Yoot Saito: founder and CEO of Vivarium Inc.
- Tim Schafer: founder and studio director of Double Fine
- Alex Seropian & Jason Jones: Founders of Bungie
- Asha Sharma: EVP & CEO of the Xbox division of Microsoft
- Jeremiah Slaczka: co-founder of 5th Cell
- Jeff Spangenberg: founder of Retro Studios
- Phil Spencer: CEO of Microsoft Gaming, Previously head of the Xbox brand
- Tim & Chris Stamper: founders of Ultimate Play the Game & Rare
- Lisa Su: chairwoman and CEO of AMD
- Goichi Suda: Founder & CEO of Grasshopper Manufacture
- Tim Sweeney: Founder and CEO of Epic Games
- Hirokazu Tanaka: President of Creatures
- Kenzo Tsujimoto: founder of Capcom and Irem
- Feargus Urquhart: CEO of Obsidian Entertainment
- Swen Vincke: founder and CEO of Larian Studios
- Christopher Weaver: founder of Bethesda Softworks and co-founder of ZeniMax Media
- Paul Wedgwood: founder and former CEO of Splash Damage
- Jordan Weisman: founder of FASA
- David Whatley: founder of Simutronics
- Jim Whitehurst: CEO of Unity Technologies (2023-Present)
- Andrew Wilson: CEO of Electronic Arts (2013–Present) & director of Intel (2017–Present)
- Mike Wilson: Co-founder of multiple indie video game publishers. Notably Devolver Digital, Gamecock Media Group, Gathering of Developers, and Good Shepherd Entertainment
- Hiroshi Yamauchi: former president of Nintendo (1949–2002)
- Riccardo Zacconi: founder of King
- Strauss Zelnick: CEO of Take-Two Interactive
- Tony Zhang: co-founder and former CTO of Tencent

== Hardware ==
- Ralph Baer: inventor of the Magnavox Odyssey, the first video game console
- Seamus Blackley: main designer and developer of the original Xbox
- Bill Dally: chief scientist of Nvidia
- William Higinbotham: main developer of Tennis for Two. One of the first video games developed in the early history of video games.
- Josef Kates: engineer who developed the first digital game-playing machine
- Ken Kutaragi: creator of the PlayStation brand
- Jerry Lawson: co-creator of the Fairchild Channel F console, the first cartridge-based video game console
- Palmer Luckey: founder of Oculus VR (now Reality Labs) and the designer of the Oculus Rift
- Ivan Sutherland: Internet pioneer who is regarded as the "father of computer graphics."
- Xiaoyuan Tu & Wei Yen: founders of AiLive, who helped create the motion sensing hardware for the Wii
- Gunpei Yokoi: inventor of the Game & Watch, Game Boy and WonderSwan

== Music and sound ==
- Neal Acree – Composer, Diablo III, Overwatch; expansion music StarCraft II, World of Warcraft
- Gareth Coker – Composer, Ark: Survival Evolved, Ori series; Darksiders Genesis, Halo Infinite notable games
- Toby Fox - Composer, Deltarune, Escaped Chasm, Hiveswap, Little Town Hero, OFF (2025), Pokémon series; Undertale
- Woody Jackson – Composer, Red Dead Redemption series; Grand Theft Auto V, L.A. Noire notable games
- Koji Kondo – Composer, Super Mario series, The Legend of Zelda series; Star Fox 64 notable game
- Jesper Kyd – Composer, Assassin's Creed, Borderlands, Hitman, State of Decay series
- Martin O'Donnell – Composer, Halo, Myth series; Destiny, Oni notable games
- Shoji Meguro – Composer, Shin Megami Tensei, Persona series, Trauma Center series; Catherine, Maken X, Metaphor: ReFantazio notable games
- Yasunori Mitsuda – Composer, Chrono, Inazuma Eleven, Shadow Hearts, Xeno series
- Tom Salta – Composer, Halo: Spartan series, several Tom Clancy's games; Deathloop, PUBG: Battlegrounds, Wolfenstein: Youngblood notable games
- Rik Schaffer – Sound Designer for multiple Activision, Bethesda Softworks, DreamWorks, Universal Interactive titles; Composer, The Elder Scrolls Online & Vampire: The Masquerade series.
- Garry Schyman – Composer, BioShock, Destroy All Humans!, Middle Earth: Shadow's series; Dante's Inferno, Resistance: Retribution, The Bureau: XCOM Declassified notable games
- Yoko Shimomura – Composer, Kingdom Hearts & Mario & Luigi series; Final Fantasy XV, Street Fighter II, Super Mario RPG notable games
- Jeremy Soule – Composer, Guild Wars, Harry Potter, The Elder Scrolls, Total Annihilation series
- Kumi Tanioka – Composer, Final Fantasy Crystal Chronicles, Minecraft series
- Nobuo Uematsu – Composer, Final Fantasy, Blue Dragon, Lord of Vermilion, Terra Battle series.
- Jack Wall – Composer, Mass Effect series; several Call of Duty games
- Austin Wintory – Composer, Abzû, Aliens: Fireteam Elite, Assassin's Creed Syndicate, Journey notable games
- David Wise – Composer, Battletoads, Donkey Kong series; Banjo-Kazooie: Nuts & Bolts, Star Fox Adventures, Super Smash Bros. Melee notable games
- Michiru Yamane – Composer, Castlevania, Twinbee (NES) series; Suikoden III, Suikoden IV, notable games
- Inon Zur – Composer, Dragon Age, EverQuest, Fallout, Prince of Persia, Star Trek, Syberia series. Crysis, The Elder Scrolls: Blades, Icewind Dale II, Starfield notable games

== Online gaming ==
- Richard Bartle: wrote the first MUD along with Roy Trubshaw
- David Baszucki: creator of Roblox
- John D. Carmack: developed an early online version of Doom which supported up to four players; later Quake supported 16 players which helped popularize online gaming
- Jess Cliffe & Minh Le: developed the first Counter-Strike game and thus started the franchise.
- J. Todd Coleman: Lead creative director of Shadowbane, Wizard101, Pirate101, Crowfall, and many other MMORPG titles.
- Don Daglow: designed first MMORPG with graphics, Neverwinter Nights for AOL
- Alex Evans: created the game engine for the LittleBigPlanet games & Dreams
- Jeff Kaplan: lead designer of Overwatch
- Sampo Karjalainen & Aapo Kyrölä: creators of Habbo Hotel
- John De Margheriti: CEO of BigWorld Pty Ltd, makers of Massively Multiplayer Online Game Middleware (MMOG) technology
- Elonka Dunin: General Manager at Simutronics, senior editor of IGDA Online Games White Papers
- Kelton Flinn: designer of Air Warrior and many other pioneering online games, co-founder of Kesmai
- Richard Garriott (a.k.a. Lord British): Creator of Ultima Online, Work on Lineage, Lineage II (Electronic Arts, NCsoft)
- Dean Hall: Creator of DayZ
- IceFrog: lead designer of Defense of the Ancients and Dota 2
- Raph Koster: LegendMUD, Ultima Online, Star Wars Galaxies. (Electronic Arts, Sony Online Entertainment)
- Brad McQuaid: co-creator of EverQuest (Verant Interactive, Sony Online Entertainment, Sigil Games)
- Rob Pardo: lead designer and producer of World of Warcraft
- Philip Rosedale: founded the virtual world Second Life
- John Smedley: co-creator of EverQuest (Verant Interactive, Sony Online Entertainment) and president of Sony Online Entertainment
- Robin Walker: co-developer of Team Fortress Classic and Team Fortress 2
- Gordon Walton: executive producer
- Jordan Weisman: founder of 42 Entertainment, co-creator of I Love Bees and The Beast
- Will Wright: c of The Sims Online (Electronic Arts)
- Naoki Yoshida: producer and director of Final Fantasy XIV and its following expansions.

== Producing ==
- Eiji Aonuma, The Legend of Zelda series
- Mark Cerny, Jak and Daxter series, Spyro the Dragon series and Ratchet & Clank
- Katsuya Eguchi, Animal Crossing series, Star Fox series and Wii series
- Guillaume de Fondaumière, Fahrenheit (or Indigo Prophecy), Heavy Rain, Beyond: Two Souls and Detroit: Become Human
- Yuji Horii, Dragon Quest series
- Sam Houser, Grand Theft Auto series, Bully, The Warriors, Max Payne 3
- Todd Howard, The Elder Scrolls III: Morrowind, Oblivion, Skyrim, Fallout 3, Fallout 4, Fallout 76 and Starfield
- Keiji Inafune, Megaman character designer, producer of Dead Rising and Onimusha
- Hideo Kojima, Metal Gear, Zone of the Enders, Death Stranding, and Death Stranding 2: On the Beach
- Ken Levine, BioShock, System Shock 2
- Hisashi Nogami, Animal Crossing series and Splatoon series
- Jade Raymond, Assassin's Creed
- John Romero, executive producer and designer of Heretic, Hexen: Beyond Heretic
- Hironobu Sakaguchi, Final Fantasy series
- Bruce Shelley, Age of Empires
- Rod Fergusson, Gears of War series
- Warren Spector, Thief, Deus Ex
- Daniel Stahl, Star Trek Online, Champions Online
- Yu Suzuki, Virtua Fighter series, Shenmue
- Satoshi Tajiri, Pokémon franchise
- Dave D. Taylor, Abuse
- Keiichiro Toyama, Silent Hill series, Siren, Gravity Rush, and Gravity Rush 2
- Swen Vincke, Baldur's Gate 3 and Divinity series

== Programming ==
- Michael Abrash: rendering optimization for Quake, author of graphics programming books
- Dave Akers: programmer of the arcade games Klax and Escape from the Planet of the Robot Monsters
- Ed Boon: programmer and creator of the Mortal Kombat series
- Jens Bergensten: lead developer of Minecraft since 2011
- Danielle Bunten Berry: M.U.L.E., Seven Cities of Gold
- Jonathan Blow: Braid and The Witness
- David Braben: co-creator of Elite
- Bill Budge: Raster Blaster and Pinball Construction Set
- John D. Carmack: Wolfenstein 3D, Doom, Quake, co-founded id Software
- Don Daglow: 1970s mainframe games Baseball, Dungeon; also did Intellivision Utopia, first sim game
- Fred Ford: lead programmer of The Horde, Pandemonium!, the Star Control series, and the Skylanders series
- Richard Garriott (a.k.a. Lord British): creator of the Ultima Online series, Tabula Rasa and founder of Origin Systems
- Nasir Gebelli: programmer of Final Fantasy (NES), Secret of Mana (Super NES), and Apple II games
- Mark Healey: worked on Theme Park, Magic Carpet, Dungeon Keeper, the Fun School games, the LittleBigPlanet games, and Dreams
- Rebecca Heineman: Out of this world and The Bard's Tale
- William Higinbotham: designer and programmer of Tennis for Two, one of the first video games developed during the early history of video games
- Alec Holowka: Aquaria, I'm O.K – A Murder Simulator, Night in the Woods
- Wesley Huntress: Rendezvous: A Space Shuttle Simulator and Wilderness: A Survival Adventure
- Alexandre Julliard: lead developer of Wine (1994-present). Also notably worked on Proton.
- André LaMothe: author of several game programming books
- Maddy Thorson: founder of Extremely OK Games (previously Matt Makes Games) and lead developer of TowerFall and Celeste
- Al Lowe: Leisure Suit Larry series
- Seumas McNally: founder of Longbow Digital Arts and lead programmer of DX-Ball, DX-Ball 2, and Tread Marks. The Seumas McNally Grand Prize is named after him.
- Jordan Mechner: Karateka and Prince of Persia series
- Sid Meier: Civilization series, Railroad Tycoon, co-founder of Firaxis Games
- Alan Miller: original programmer for Atari 2600, co-founded Activision and Accolade
- Jeff Minter: founder of Llamasoft and programmer of most of their games
- David Mullich: The Prisoner and other Edu-Ware games
- Yuji Naka: Sonic the Hedgehog and other Sega games
- Gabe Newell: Half-Life; co-founder of Valve
- Markus Persson (a.k.a. Notch): created Minecraft; founder of Mojang
- Steve Polge: Unreal series and other Epic Games games
- Zoë Quinn: programmer and video game blogger. Known for developing Depression Quest and for her role in the Gamergate controversy
- Frédérick Raynal: Alone in the Dark and the Little Big Adventure series
- Chris Roberts: programmer and designer of Freelancer, Star Citizen, and the Wing Commander games.
- Warren Robinett: Adventure, Rocky's Boots, & Robot Odyssey
- John Romero: Commander Keen, Doom, Quake
- Jim Sachs: programmer of Saucer Attack and other home computer era games
- Chris Sawyer: programmer and designer RollerCoaster Tycoon series and other games
- Cher Scarlett: programmer who worked at Blizzard Entertainment and known for her role in California Department of Fair Employment and Housing v. Activision Blizzard
- Tim Schafer: programmer and designer of Full Throttle, Grim Fandango, Psychonauts, Psychonauts 2, Brütal Legend, and Broken Age. Also worked on the Monkey Island games.
- Ken Silverman: author of the Build engine game engine
- Tim Sweeney: founded Epic Games, Unreal series and the Unreal Engine
- Swen Vincke: founder of Larian Studios, lead developer of Baldur's Gate 3 and Divinity series
- Anne Westfall: programmer of the Archon series of games
- Will Wright: programmer of first games in SimCity series and co-founder of Maxis
- Brianna Wu: programmer known for working on Revolution 60 and for her role in the Gamergate controversy
- Corrinne Yu: Halo lead and principal engine architect (Microsoft Halo team), Gearbox Software (studio wide) Director of Platform Technology, Ion Storm (studio wide) Director of Technology, Prey engine lead programmer at 3D Realms
