= Video game producer =

Top person in charge of overseeing a video game's development

A video game producer is the top person in charge of overseeing development of a video game.

== History ==
The earliest documented use of the term producer in games was by Trip Hawkins, who established the position when he founded Electronic Arts in 1982:

Producers basically manage the relationship with the artist. They find the talent, work out product deals, get contracts signed, manage them, and bring them to their conclusion. The producers do most of the things that a product manager does. They don't do the marketing, which in some cases product managers do. They don't make decisions about packaging and merchandising, but they do get involved ... they're a little like book editors, a little bit like film producers, and a lot like product managers.

Sierra On-Line's 1982 computer game Time Zone may be the first to list credits for "Producer" and "Executive Producer". As of late 1983 Electronic Arts had five producers: A product marketer and two others from Hawkins' former employer Apple ("good at working with engineering people"), one former IBM salesman and executive recruiter, and one product marketer from Automated Simulations; it popularized the use of the title in the industry. Hawkins' vision—influenced by his relationship with Jerry Moss—was that producers would manage artists and repertoire in the same way as in the music business, and Hawkins brought in record producers from A&M Records to help train those first producers. Activision made Brad Fregger their first producer in April 1983.

Although the term is an industry standard today, it was dismissed as "imitation Hollywood" by many game executives and press members at the time. Over its entire history, the role of the video game producer has been defined in a wide range of ways by different companies and different teams, and there are a variety of positions within the industry referred to as producer.

There are relatively few superstars of game production that parallel those in film, in part because top producers are usually employed by publishers who choose to play down publicizing their contributions. Unlike many of their counterparts in film or music, these producers do not run their own independent companies.

== Types of producers ==
Most video and computer games are developed by third-party developers. In these cases, there may be external and internal producers. External producers may act as "executive producers" and are employed by the game's publisher. Internal producers work for the developer itself and have more of a hands-on role. Some game developers may have no internal producers, however, and may rely solely on the publisher's producer.

For an internal producer, associate producers tend to specialize in an area of expertise depending on the team they are producing for and what skills they have a background in. These specializations include but are not limited to: programming, design, art, sound, and quality assurance. A normal producer is usually the project manager and is in charge of delivering the product to the publisher on time and on budget. An executive producer will be managing all of the products in the company and making sure that the games are on track to meet their goals and stay within the company's goals and direction.

For an external producer, their job responsibilities may focus mainly on overseeing several projects being worked on by a number of developers. While keeping updated on the progress of the games being developed externally, they inform the upper management of the publisher of the status of the pending projects and any problems they may be experiencing. If a publisher's producer is overseeing a game being developed internally, their role is more akin to that of an internal producer and will generally only work on one game or a few small games.

As games have grown larger and more expensive, line producers have become part of some teams. Based on filmmaking traditions, line producers focus on project scheduling and costing to ensure titles are completed on time and on budget.

== Responsibilities ==
An internal producer is heavily involved in the development of, usually, a single game. Responsibilities for this position vary from company to company, but in general, the person in this position has the following duties:

- Negotiating contracts, including licensing deals
- Acting as a liaison between the development staff and the upper stakeholders (publisher or executive staff)
- Developing and maintaining schedules and budgets
- Overseeing creative (art and design) and technical development (game programming) of the game
- Ensuring timely delivery of deliverables (such as milestones)
- Scheduling timely quality assurance (testing)
- Arranging for beta testing and focus groups, if applicable
- Arranging for localization
- Pitching game ideas to publishers

In short, the internal producer is ultimately responsible for timely delivery and final quality of the game.

For small games, the producer may interact directly with the programming and creative staff. For larger games, the producer will seek the assistance of the lead programmer, art lead, game designer and testing lead. While it is customary for the producer to meet with the entire development staff from time to time, for larger games, they will only meet with the leads on a regular basis to keep updated on the development status. In smaller studios, a producer may fill any slack in the production team by doing the odd job of writing the game manual or producing game assets.

For most games, the producer does not have a large role but does have some influence on the development of the video game design. While not a game designer, the producer has to weave the wishes of the publisher or upper management into the design. They usually seek the assistance of the game designer in this effort. So the final game design is a result the effort of the designer and some influence of the producer.

== Compensation ==
In general, video game producers earn the third most out of game development positions, behind business (management) and programmers. According to an annual survey of salaries in the industry, producers earn an average of USD75,000 annually. A video game producer with less than 3 years of experience makes, on average, around $55,000 annually. A video game producer with more than 6 years of experience makes, on average, over $125,000 annually. The salaries of a video game producer will vary depending on the region and the studio.

== Education ==
Most video game producers complete a bachelor's degree program in game design, computer science, digital media or business. Some common courses are communications, mathematics, accounting, art, digital modeling and animation.

Employers typically require three plus years of experience, since a producer has to have gone through the development cycle several times to really understand how unpredictable the business is. The most common path to becoming a video game producer begins by first working as a game tester, then moving up the quality assurance ladder, and then eventually on to production. This is easier to accomplish if one stays with the same studio, reaping the benefits of having built relationships with the production department.

== See also ==
- List of video game producers
