= Aquaria (video game) =

2007 video game

- Developer: Bit Blot
- Publishers: Bit Blot; Ambrosia Software (OS X)
- Designers: Alec Holowka; Derek Yu
- Artist: Derek Yu
- Composer: Alec Holowka
- Platforms: Windows; OS X; Linux; iOS; Android
- Release: Windows; December 7, 2007; OS X; November 13, 2008; Linux; May 4, 2010; iOS; November 2, 2011; Android; June 18, 2013
- Genres: Action-adventure, Metroidvania
- Mode: Single-player

Aquaria is an action-adventure game designed by Alec Holowka and Derek Yu, who published the game in 2007 as an independent game company Bit Blot. The side-scrolling game follows Naija, an aquatic humanoid woman, as she explores the underwater world of Aquaria. Along her journey, she learns about the history of the world she inhabits as well as her own past. The gameplay focuses on a combination of swimming, singing, and combat, through which Naija can interact with the world. Her songs can move items, affect plants and animals, and change her physical appearance into other forms that have different abilities, like firing projectiles at hostile creatures, or passing through barriers inaccessible to her in her natural form.

After more than two years of development, the game was released in late 2007 for Windows. A port of the game to Mac OS X was released in 2008 by Ambrosia Software, and an updated version of the game was released on the Steam service that same year. A Linux version of the game was released as part of the first Humble Indie Bundle collection in 2010, a version for the iPad was released in 2011, and an Android version debuted in 2013 alongside another Humble Bundle collection. In 2009, an album with the Aquaria soundtrack was released. It includes all of the music in the game, as well as a new nine-minute vocal track and a few remixes.

Reviews of the game were generally positive. Critics focused primarily on the visuals, music, and atmosphere as being particularly praiseworthy. The controls and gameplay were also lauded, while negative critiques more often centered on the map system and limited variety of objectives. The game won the Seumas McNally Grand Prize at the Independent Games Festival in March 2007.

== Gameplay ==
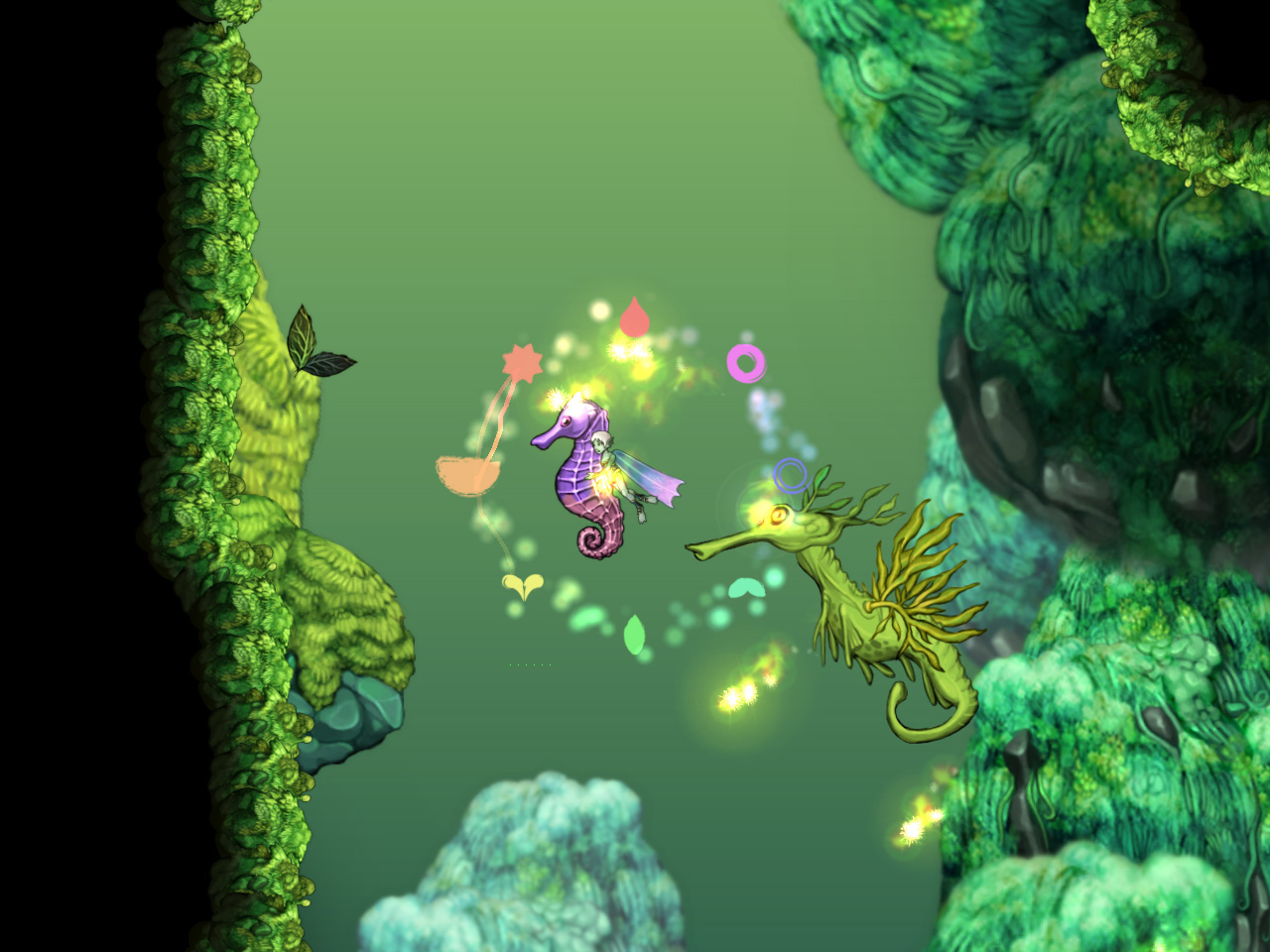
Naija in her default form riding a seahorse next to a sea dragon. Surrounding her is the eight-note ring through which the player can play songs.

Aquaria is an action-adventure game, heavily focused on exploration and puzzle-solving, with a 2D side-scrolling design and non-linear gameplay. The player controls Naija, a lone underwater dweller; although similar to a human woman, Naija also has several fish-like qualities, such as the ability to breathe underwater and propel herself quickly with webbed feet. The game, originally only available for personal computers, was designed to be primarily controlled solely through the mouse, though it can also be controlled with a keyboard or Xbox 360 controller. The player directs Naija through an underwater world composed of several distinct regions, ranging from caves to underwater ruins to sunlit oases. These areas are filled with plant and animal life, which can be hostile, friendly, or neutral towards her. Hostile plants and animals can hurt Naija, reducing her health meter, by touching her or firing projectiles at her.

In general, Naija cannot interact directly with objects in the world. Instead, the majority of actions are accomplished through singing short tunes. The player does this by selecting a series of notes displayed in a circle of eight choices in the correct order. Each note corresponds with a different color. Singing notes affects plants and objects of the same color as the note, while singing the tunes, once learned through the plot, can lift objects, create a shield around Naija, or change Naija into different "forms" which have different appearances and unique abilities critical to overcoming the various challenges and obstacles found in the game. The specific tones that are played when the player selects a note can subtly change in different regions, matching the background music. The default form, or "normal form", is the only one in which Naija can sing, and is the only one where her appearance is modifiable by the player by having Naija wear costumes found throughout the game.

Aquaria trailer soundtrack
The soundtrack for the game's trailer, featuring music, voice acting, and sound effects from the game

Other forms, which can only be used once found in-game, are the "energy form", in which Naija can shoot projectiles to attack enemy creatures, "beast form", which allows Naija to swim faster through the water and eat small fish to restore health, and "nature form", in which Naija can shoot seeds that produce flowers and spiky plants that can harm other creatures. In this form, Naija is not harmed by thorns on any plants. The player can also learn the "sun form", which allows Naija to give off light in dark regions, "spirit form", which allows the player to move to specific locations marked by blue crystals without time passing, "fish form", where Naija turns into a small, fast fish, and "dual form", found at the end of the game, which allows Naija and another character named Li who is met late in the game's plot to merge, with actions taken by one affecting the other.

While exploring the world, Naija can collect various ingredients from interaction with plants and animals, mainly by combating her foes. These ingredients can be used to cook dishes, which have varying effects on Naija. The most common effects are healing and enhancing various characteristics such as speed and defense, but there are some more exotic dishes which grant her new abilities. The player can learn new recipes by collecting new dishes directly, but can also learn them by combining ingredients without first knowing the recipe.

== Plot ==
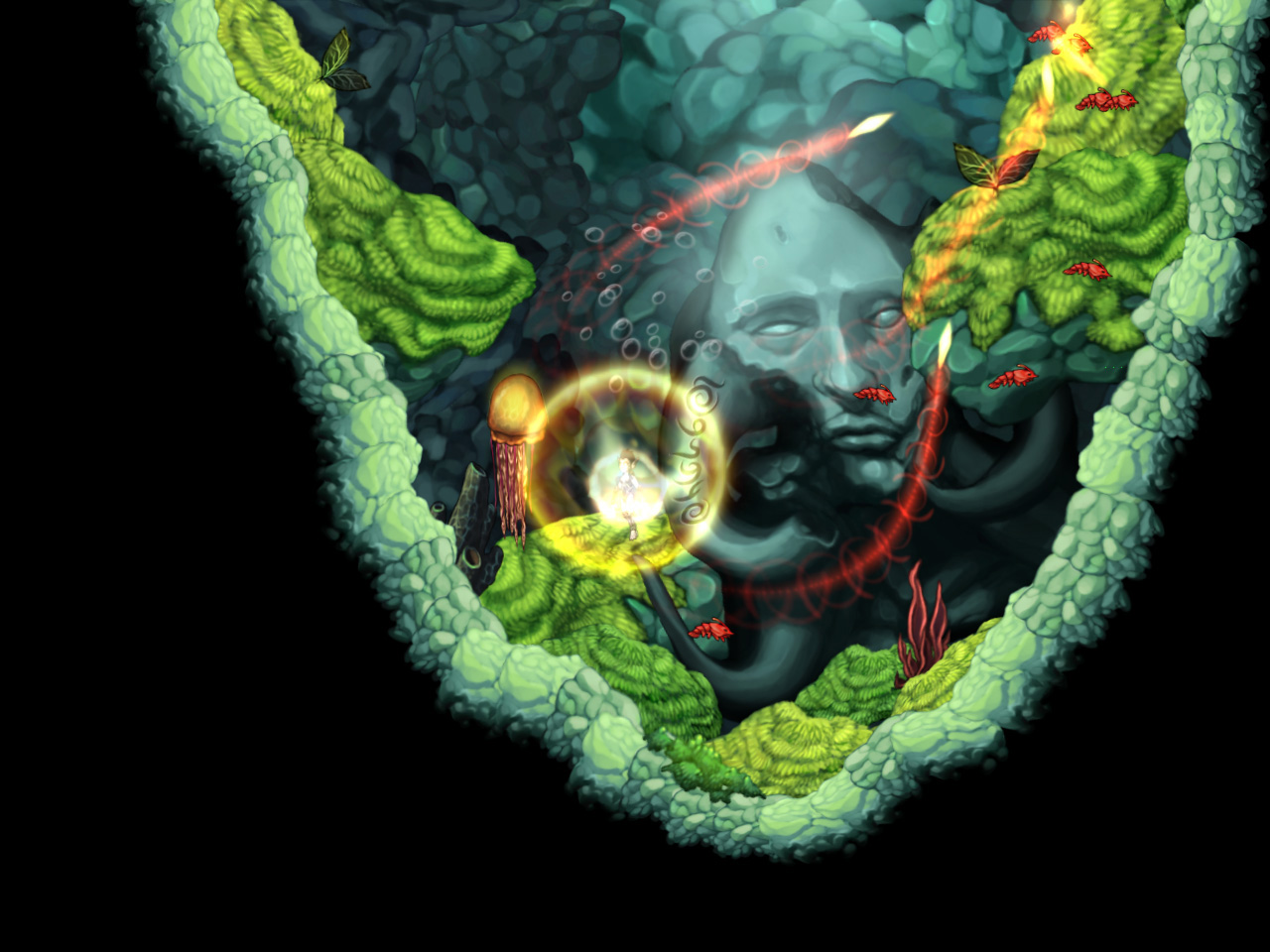
Naija in the "energy form" attacking sea creatures

As the game opens, Naija has lost almost all of her memories, and is unaware of the world outside of her home as she "lives as a simple creature". The player is told this in voice-over narrations in the form of a story told by a future Naija. These narrations serve as the primary source of information about Naija throughout the game, though there are occasional cutscenes. After being confronted by a shadowy figure and being shown a series of flashbacks she does not understand, Naija awakens. Feeling loneliness as the only member of her species, Naija decides to explore the world around her. As the player explores, Naija discovers more and more about the history of the world, "Aquaria", and about her own past. The player is not forced to go through the plotline in a set sequence. The only limiting factor is physical barriers such as areas that can be accessed only by using a specific form. Combinations of these physical limitations place some plot elements later in the game. The narrative for the majority of the game is centered on Naija's exploration of a series of ruined civilizations that she finds, each with a large monster in them. These civilizations make up the different regions of the game.

Towards the end of the game, Naija discovers that all of the ruined civilizations she has found throughout the game were destroyed by a god, "the Creator", who was jealous of the rising power of that civilization or of their gods. The powerful monsters she has found and defeated in each region were once the gods of that civilization. Each of these civilizations had a unique power, symbolized by the form that Naija learns after defeating their former gods. Along with Li, a human diver from the land she meets at the top of the ocean, Naija then descends to the bottom of the sea to confront the god. There she discovers that the Creator fell into the ocean as a child, and bonded with an ancient spirit to gain god-like powers. He then created Aquaria, threading a verse of a lullaby his mother had sung to him throughout, the only part of the song he remembers. The melody of this song, the "verse", is what allows Naija to sing songs that affect the world around her; parts of the melody can be heard in different forms in the songs within the game's soundtrack.

The Creator, after creating Aquaria, created a series of civilizations, making a new one in turn when each one was destroyed. The Creator kidnaps Li, with whom Naija has fallen in love, and she attacks the Creator to get him back. The player defeats the god as the final boss of the game, and returns home with Li. In the epilogue, Naija is shown with Li and their child. If the player has found all of Naija's memories by discovering places she remembers, they reveal that the shadowy figure at the beginning of the game was her mother, Mia. Mia was made by the Creator and had the ability, like Naija, to use the different powers of all of the civilizations. She fled the Creator, and hid herself and Naija among several communities in succession; after the destruction of the last one she erased Naija's memory so that she would find out the history of Aquaria on her own and defeat the Creator. In the extended epilogue shown if the player has found all of the memories, Mia appears, telling Naija that the two of them can conquer the civilisations above the water. After Naija refuses, Mia kidnaps her, and vanishes; the extended epilogue ends with Lucien—Naija and Li's son—leaving to find her. If the player has not found all of the memories, the epilogue instead ends with Naija asking the player to find out about her past, and revealing that the narration of the game was intended to be heard by her son.

== Development ==
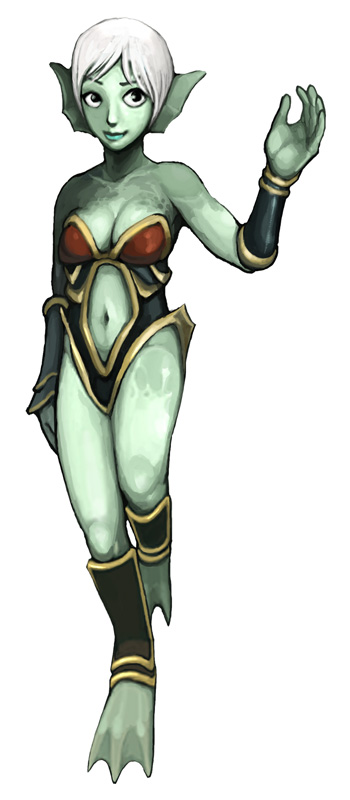
Concept art of Naija

Aquaria was developed by Derek Yu and Alec Holowka over the course of two years, off of a concept that Holowka had thought of a year prior. Yu was the lead artist, and Holowka handled the programming and audio components. Both designers had previously worked in video games; Yu had made several freeware games, including I'm O.K with Holowka and others, while Holowka had worked for several video game start-ups, none of which had ever gotten a game published. Some additional work on the game, including some level design and scripting for some enemies, was done by Brandon McCartin. Holowka and Yu officially formed the studio Bit Blot to back the game a week before submitting it to the 2007 Independent Games Festival. Aquaria was the studio's only game. Both members of the team continued to make video games, but not as a partnership; Holowka went on to form a separate team called Infinite Ammo, and Yu went on to work on Spelunky.

The initial prototype of the game had styling similar to a text-based role-playing game, with a large open world and many sub-quests. After moving towards "multiple-choice text answers" and a complicated gameplay system, the team decided to simplify the game and set the 2007 Independent Games Festival as a deadline to complete everything. With this time pressure, they forced themselves to cut out a lot of what they felt was unneeded complexity, bringing the game to its core. After removing many of what they decided were extraneous elements they then added back in the cooking system, which they felt fit well with the rest of the game, as well as a map system. They then developed the game world and story in a roughly linear manner, creating basic designs of each region and then coming back to fill in details. They felt that this allowed them to create interesting ideas at the beginning of the game and then fill them out and resolve them at the end. One of these ideas was that of the "verse"; Holowka realized partway through development that he had been using the same twelve-note sequence transposed into different keys throughout the music, and realized that the idea of a pervasive musical theme to the world fit with the story. The game also includes a level and animation editor; several mods have been made for the game.

The game was developed to be able to be controlled by the player with only the mouse, after it was suggested by Yu's father. The developers felt that this control scheme forced them to make the gameplay fluid and easy to grasp, though they also added the option to control the game with a keyboard or Xbox 360 controller. Yu and Holowka considered the "hallmark" of exploratory games to be a sense of loneliness, which they made a part of the narrative, but also wanted the player to get a sense of Naija's character. To that end, they used voice-overs to demonstrate to the player what Naija was feeling during key points of the game. The voice of Naija was performed by Jenna Sharpe, who was chosen after auditioning several other voice actresses. She additionally sang the vocals for one song on the soundtrack, "Lost to the Waves". She also sang a nine-minute vocal piece, "Fear the Dark", for the release of the Aquaria soundtrack album, which was published by Bit Blot on November 14, 2009. The album features 50 tracks on two discs, including all of the music in the game as well as the new vocal track and a few remixes.

The game was released for Windows computers on December 7, 2007. A patch was later released which added new functionality to the in-game map, added widescreen support, and tweaked several game settings. A Macintosh port was released November 13, 2008, courtesy of Ambrosia Software. The game was released on Steam on December 15, 2008; it included the addition of 27 Steam Achievements. A Linux version of the game was developed by Ryan C. Gordon in 2009; an open beta ran until February 6, 2010, and the Linux version of the game was released as part of the first Humble Indie Bundle. The source code for the game's engine was released under the GNU General Public License on June 3, 2010. A modified version was released on the iPad on November 2, 2011. This version, which includes touchscreen support and changes to the way the map works, was created by Andrew Church, who was approached to do the port by Holowka after he did an unofficial PlayStation Portable source port. The Humble Bundle with Android 6 collection, which was launched on June 18, 2013, debuted an Android version of Aquaria.

== Reception ==
Reception

Aggregate score
Aggregator	Score
Metacritic	PC: 82/100 (7 reviews) iOS: 84/100 (8 reviews)

Review scores
Publication	Score
Eurogamer	7/10
IGN	7.4/10
PC Gamer (UK)	8.1/10
GameCritics.com	9/10

Aquaria was the Seumas McNally Grand Prize winner of the 2007 Independent Games Festival, and was also a finalist in the categories of Design Innovation, Excellence in Visual Art, and Excellence in Audio. The festival praised the game's "fluid controls, unique, non-linear gameplay, and vibrant hand-drawn storybook-style graphics". The game received praise from many different reviewers; Cam Shea of IGN called it "a stunning effort from such a small team", Richard Naik of GameCritics called it "an extremely high-quality product" and a fine example of the side-scroller genre, while Chris Dahlen of The A.V. Club termed it "not so much a retro adventure as a fresh take on everything that made the old 2D adventures great". Praise for the game was centered primarily on its visuals and atmosphere. Hyper's Tim Henderson commended the game for "a rare and genuine sense of exploration, wonder and discovery". A review by Scott Colbourne from The Globe and Mail termed Aquaria "drop-dead beautiful" with a "deep and affecting story" and summarized it as "a game you can get comfortably lost in".

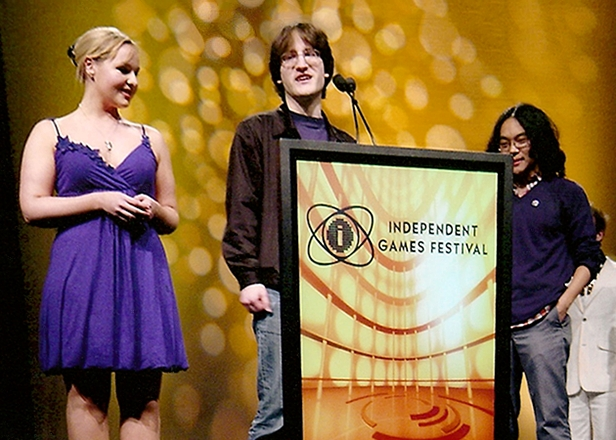
Jenna Sharpe, Alec Holowka and Derek Yu accepting the grand prize at the 2007 Independent Games Festival

Other reviewers, such as Tom Bramwell of Eurogamer and Chris Holt of Macworld echoed the praises for the graphics and atmosphere, while Craig Pearson of PC Gamer UK added praises for the music and voiceovers and Suzie Ochs of MacLife praised the music and story. Other praises for the game came for its control scheme and for the gameplay mechanics, with Holt calling out the cooking system as worthy of praise. Though noting that the visuals and presentation of the game would be the first thing players noticed, Nathan Cocks of PC PowerPlay claimed that "from a design standpoint, Aquaria is a triumph," with the right amount of complexity and level design that is "spot on".

Several reviewers, such as Bramwell and Holt, criticized the map system present in the initial version of the game as being confusing and difficult. Other reviewers had different concerns, such as Henderson, who critiqued the initial release version for "lack of widescreen support and being occasionally fiddly", or Naik, who felt that the control scheme was not as intuitive when using an Xbox 360 controller. Shea and Pearson felt that the game could have used more puzzles or a wider variety of quests and objectives to balance out the exploration and combat. They did not feel, though, that these downsides compared to the game's positives, with Pearson saying that "the good far outweighs what are, essentially, niggles."
