= Derek Yu =

American video game designer & blogger (born 1982)

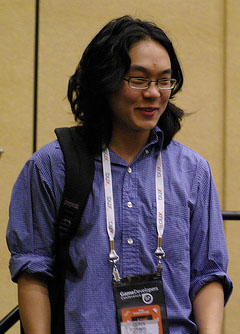
- At the 2007 Game Developers Conference
- Born: July 2, 1982 (age 44); Pasadena, California
- Occupations: Game designer, artist, blogger
- Website: www.derekyu.com

Derek Yu (born July 2, 1982) is an American independent video game designer, video game artist, and blogger. Yu has designed and co-designed several award-winning games, most famously Spelunky, Aquaria, and Eternal Daughter. He is also notable as a blogger and custodian of the influential TIGSource blog/community about independent video games. He has been called an "indie superstar" and a "genuine icon" of the video game industry.

== Life and career ==
Yu's first exposure to computer games was an Atari 2600 when he was a child. Already in second grade, he and a friend started mapping out simple games on paper, later moving on to making text adventures on the PC and eventually using Klik & Play to make games. After graduating from college with a degree in computer science, Yu moved to San Francisco and worked as a freelance illustrator.

In 2007, Yu created satiric run-and-gun freeware game I'm O.K – A Murder Simulator with Alec Holowka and two others, in response to Jack Thompson's "A Modest Video Game Proposal", an open letter regarding gun violence and violent video games that offered $10,000 to charity if videogame developers would dare to make a game depicting videogame developers being killed. The collaboration with Holowka later led to the formation of the company Bit Blot and the release of Aquaria in 2007, which was a big success and won the Seumas McNally award at the 2007 IGF. According to Yu, "Not only did Aquaria sell well enough that [Alec Holowka and I] could continue making games full time, but the positive feedback we received from players and critics also validated us as artists and helped to put to rest our doubts about whether we were making something worthwhile." However, Bit Blot never produced another title, and the last update to the company's website occurred in 2011. Yu and Holowka lived in separate countries, and Holowka cited the long-distance nature of the collaboration as a source of tension during a 2008 interview.

In 2008, Yu released the highly popular and influential roguelike Spelunky, propelling Yu's work to the wider mainstream for the first time. A sequel, Spelunky 2, was released in 2020.

In 2014, Yu designed the card game Time Barons with Jon Perry.

In 2016, Yu and Perry thought up the idea to develop 50 distinct games published under one collection, titled UFO 50. Other developers, such as Eirik Suhrke and Ojiro Fumoto, helped with development. The game released in 2024.

== Ludography ==
Date	Title	Role	Notes	Ref(s)
1999	Diabolika	Co-designer, Artist	Remade as one of the games included in UFO 50, titled under the name Devilition	
2002	Eternal Daughter	Co-designer, Artist		
2002	DRL	Artist		
2003	Diabolika II			
2006	I'm O.K – A Murder Simulator			
2007	Aquaria		Winner of the 2007 IGF Seumas McNally Grand Prize.	
2008	Spelunky		PC Gamer UK 2013 Game of the Year. Originally released as a freeware Windows title, an enhanced remake was first released on Xbox 360 in 2012.	
2020	Spelunky 2			
2024	UFO 50	Co-director	Contains remakes of Yu's past games Diabolika and Quibble Race.	

== Bibliography ==
- Yu, Derek (March 2016). Spelunky. Los Angeles: Boss Fight Books. ISBN 978-1940535111.
