= I'm O.K – A Murder Simulator =

2006 video game

- Title screen, a homage to Mega Man 2
- Developer: Thompsonsoft
- Publisher: Thompsonsoft
- Designer: Derek Yu
- Programmer: Chris Hanson
- Artists: Derek Yu; Philippe Jones; Christopher Howard Wolf
- Composer: Alec Holowka
- Engine: Multimedia Fusion
- Platform: Microsoft Windows
- Release: February 2006
- Genre: Run and gun
- Mode: Single-player

I'm O.K – A Murder Simulator is a 2006 freeware video game developed by Derek Yu, Chris Hanson, Philippe Jones, Alec Holowka and Christopher Howard Wolf. It was created as a satirical response to a challenge by anti-video game-violence activist and disbarred attorney Jack Thompson.

== Background ==
This game was created and released in response to "A Modest Video Game Proposal" issued in late 2005 by activist attorney Jack Thompson, known for his opposition to sex and violence in entertainment, including computer and video games. This challenge dared computer game producers to release a game following a "script" he outlined, in which the grieving father of a child killed by a computer gamer takes vengeance by murdering many people connected with the gaming industry in a brutal manner. Thompson promised to contribute a $10,000 donation to the charity of choice of Paul Eibeler (then-chairman of Take-Two Interactive, one of the game companies most heavily criticized by Thompson) if such a game were released. However, he has since claimed that the proposal was only a joke, and currently, no charity has been designated by Eibeler. The makers of the gaming-related webcomic Penny Arcade have, however, made a $10,000 donation in Thompson's name to the Entertainment Software Association Foundation, a philanthropic, grant-giving body run by the Entertainment Software Association.

The "O.K" in the title refers to the initials of the protagonist, Osaki Kim (a name specifically requested by Thompson in his proposal), but together with the first part of the game's name is also a play on the accusation that video game violence is being considered normal by manufacturers and gamers. The reference to a "Murder Simulator" refers to what Thompson regularly proclaimed all violent computer games to be.

I'm O.K is a side-scrolling video game with 16-bit era low-resolution graphics that shares (to a degree) the basic gameplay (and somewhat lowbrow humor) of the Metal Slug series.
