= Frank Wu (artist) =

American artist (born 1964)

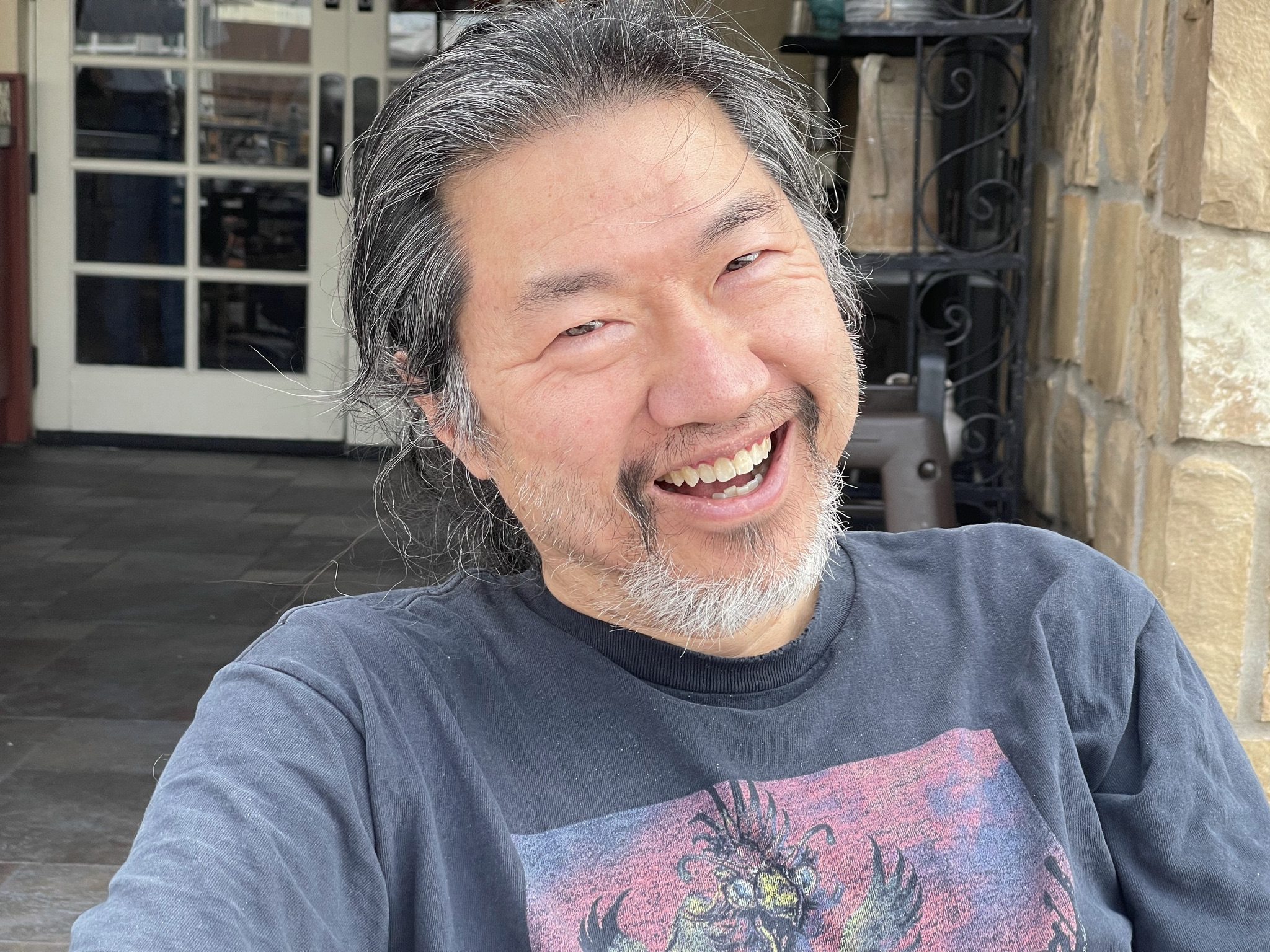
- Wu in 2021
- Born: 1964 (age 61–62); Philadelphia, Pennsylvania, U.S.
- Known for: Painting, film
- Movement: Fantasy, science fiction, horror, humor
- Spouse: Brianna Wu

Chinese name
- Traditional Chinese: 吳其美
- Simplified Chinese: 吴其美
Transcriptions
Standard Mandarin
- Hanyu Pinyin: Wú Qíměi
- Website: frankwu.com

Frank Wu (born 1964) is an American science fiction and fantasy artist living in Dedham, Massachusetts. He won the Hugo Award for Best Fan Artist four times, in 2004, 2006, 2007 and 2009.

== Biography ==
Wu works in many media, including acrylic and digital painting, and created a portrait of a Klingon girl for a documentary about the Klingon language, Earthlings: Ugly Bags of Mostly Water. He is a regular contributor to science fiction webzines, such as The Drink Tank, and in 2009 announced his ultimately unsuccessful candidacy for 2010's TransAtlantic Fan Fund.

Wu is also a filmmaker, having released in 2006 the animated short "The Tragical Historie of Guidolon the Giant Space Chicken." A director's cut of this short was released in 2007, and a full-length version was in production as of 2008.

In addition to these activities, Wu holds a PhD in bacterial genetics from University of Wisconsin–Madison, though his day job is in patent law for a pharmaceutical conglomerate. He is also a member of BASFA, the Bay Area Science Fiction Association.

He provided designs for the spaceships as well as the space station N313 for the videogame Revolution 60. He also co-wrote and produced illustrations for the game's technical manual, The Chessboard Lethologica, which provides more background on the universe, characters and technology of Revolution 60.

== Awards ==
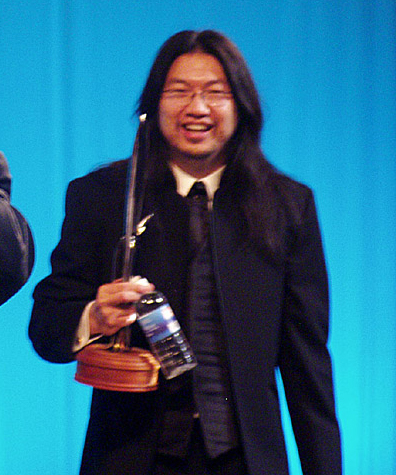
Frank Wu, at the Hugo Awards ceremony, WorldCon, Boston, 2004

He was nominated for the Hugo Award for Best Fan Artist in 2002 and 2003, and won the award in 2004, 2006, 2007 and 2009; In 2008 he was nominated for a fourth Hugo Award for Best Fan Artist, but declined the nomination. Nominated again in 2009, he accepted and won his fourth Hugo, but used his acceptance speech to encourage future voters to consider other candidates.

He also won the Grand Prize (the Gold Award) in the Illustrators of the Future contest in 2000.

== Bibliography ==
- Wu, Frank (November 2015). "Season of the ants in a timeless land". Analog Science Fiction and Fact. 135 (11): 8–31.
