= KingsIsle Entertainment =

American video game developer

KingsIsle Entertainment, Inc.
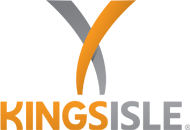
- Type: Private
- Industry: Video games
- Founded: January 2005; 21 years ago in Plano, Texas, US
- Founder: Elie Akilian
- Headquarters: Round Rock, Texas, US
- Products: Wizard101; Pirate101
- Number of employees: >120 (2024)
- Parent: Media and Games Invest (2021–present)
- Website: kingsisle.com

KingsIsle Entertainment, Inc. is an American video game developer based in Round Rock, Texas. Founded in January 2005 by Elie Akilian, the company operates a development studio in Round Rock, Texas, which hosts the majority of its staff. KingsIsle is best known for its massively multiplayer online role-playing games, Wizard101 and Pirate101. After Media and Games Invest acquired KingsIsle in January 2021, Akilian spun off the mobile games segment as Wimo Games.

== History ==
KingsIsle Entertainment was founded in January 2005 by Elie Akilian. Inspired by his teenage son, who was a fan of video games, Akilian established KingsIsle in Plano, Texas, and started hiring former employees of id Software and Ubisoft to work on what would become Wizard101. To do so, Akilian used funds generated from the 2004 sale of his communications software company Inet Technologies to Tektronix for US$325 million. J. Todd Coleman, who had sold his company, Wolfpack Studios, to Ubisoft in 2004, joined KingsIsle in December 2007 after being introduced to Akilian through mutual contacts. Coleman became the company's third employee and the first to be located in Austin, Texas, where he was joined by former Wolfpack Studios co-founder Josef Hall shortly after.

On April 25, 2008, KingsIsle formally announced its existence after "three years of lock down secrecy". At this point, the company had 100 employees in Plano and Austin, and was run by Akilian as chairman and chief executive officer, and David Nichols, formerly of Midway Games, as president. For the company's first project, Wizard101, Coleman headed the development, while Tom Hall, the co-founder of id Software and Ion Storm, served as creative director. Later that year, KingsIsle released Wizard101 as a card-battling massively multiplayer online role-playing game aimed towards children and teenagers, in which players take on the role of student witches and wizards in a fantasy world. In September 2012, Wizard101 had over 30 million registered users.

To accommodate the growth of its Austin studio, KingsIsle leased 18,000 square feet of office space in the Domain 5 building of Austin's The Domain complex in December 2008. In February 2010, KingsIsle released WizardBlox, a free game based on the Sorcery Stones mini-game from Wizard101, for iOS. By September 2010, Austin hosted the majority of KingsIsle's 120 staff. The employee count rose to 135 by February 2011, and to 220 by August 2012.

In October 2012, KingsIsle released its second online game, Pirate101, which takes place within the same universe as Wizard101. The following November, KingsIsle released Grub Guardian, a tower defense game where players defend their towers with guard animals. Grub Guardian was released on iOS, as well as for personal computers and Android devices as a browser game, and later as a native Android application.

In January 2013, Coleman announced his departure from KingsIsle. In 2014, Tyler, Texas-based company Smartflash LLC sued KingsIsle, alongside Apple Inc., Game Circus, and Robot Entertainment, for infringement on three patents filed by Smartflash's founder and part-owner, Patrick Racz, that related to digital distribution of game content, primarily in-app purchases. All defendants, except for Apple, were dismissed from the case later that same year under undisclosed circumstances. It is believed that the companies either settled out of court or had their liabilities absorbed by Apple.

On May 12, 2016, KingsIsle laid off 72 employees from its Austin studio, citing the cancellation of several unreleased mobile games and a shift in product strategy. In May 2017, KingsIsle released EverClicker for Android and iOS. In September 2017, the company leased 19,871 square feet of office space at 301 Sundance Parkway in Round Rock, Texas. In August 2018, KingsIsle released Animal Cove: Match 3 Adventure for Android and iOS. In September 2018, Dave Rosen and Craig Beers joined KingsIsle's executive team as vice-president of marketing and vice-president of product management, respectively.

In January 2021, KingsIsle was acquired by the Malta-based holding company Media and Games Invest for $126 million and further $84 million as earn-out. Akilian subsequently spun off the company's mobile games segment as Wimo Games, heading it as executive chairman. In December, the studio signed an economic development agreement with the Round Rock City Council to move into new 33,000 square feet (3,100 m^{2}) headquarters in Round Rock. The new offices facilitated all of the studio's employees, including the 80 from the former Round Rock location, and aimed at employing 150 further people within three years.

== Games developed ==
Year	Title	Platform(s)
2008	Wizard101	macOS, Microsoft Windows, Xbox Series X and Series S, Xbox One, PlayStation 5, PlayStation 4, Nintendo Switch
2010	WizardBlox	iOS
2012	Pirate101	macOS, Microsoft Windows
2012	Grub Guardian	Android, Browser, iOS
