= Alec Holowka =

Canadian video game developer (1983–2019)

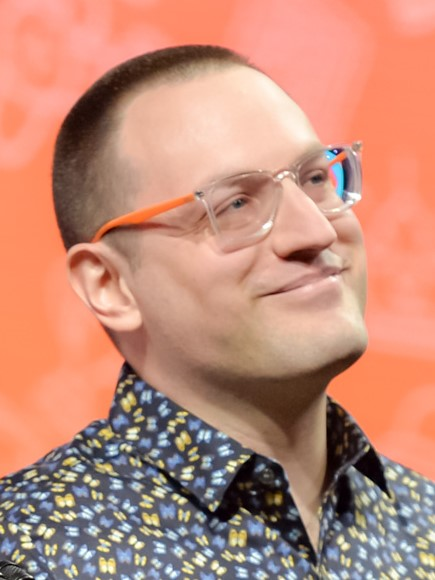
- Holowka at the 2019 Independent Games Festival
- Born: Alexander John Holowka; 30 October 1983; Winnipeg, Manitoba, Canada
- Died: 31 August 2019 (aged 35); Winnipeg, Manitoba, Canada
- Cause of death: Suicide
- Occupations: Game programmer, designer, musician
- Notable work: Night in the Woods; Aquaria

Alec Holowka (30 October 1983 – 31 August 2019) was a Canadian indie game developer, composer, and co-founder of independent game companies Infinite Ammo, Infinite Fall, and Bit Blot. He was mainly known for the award-winning titles Night in the Woods and Aquaria.

== Life and career ==
Aquaria trailer soundtrack
Holowka composed the soundtrack to Aquaria

Holowka was introduced to programming at the age of eight when his father bought him the book Basic Fun. Eventually he began working with a freeware group called Zaphire Productions. He then worked for a number of failed startups, including one in Winnipeg, working on a PC multiplayer fantasy action title and a combat racer in Vancouver for the Xbox 360.

Holowka acted as sound engineer on the 2006 freeware title I'm O.K – A Murder Simulator as a response to American lawyer Jack Thompson's "A Modest Video Game Proposal". Holowka met Derek Yu in the comments section of popular technology website Slashdot in a post regarding Jack Thompson's proposal and along with Chris Hanson and Phil Jones formed the group "Thompsonsoft" for the one-off release.

After its release Holowka introduced Yu to a project he had been working on independently, Yu was interested in the project and the two officially formed developer Bit Blot the week before the Independent Games Festival deadline. The project was released on 7 December 2007 under the title Aquaria, and was the recipient of the Independent Games Festival Seumas McNally Grand Prize for 2007.

In 2013, Holowka and independent animator Scott Benson successfully crowdfunded the game Night in the Woods. The game was released in 2017 to critical acclaim and won the BAFTA in "Narrative" and the Seumas McNally Grand Prize at the IGF.

In August 2019, Holowka was accused of physical and emotional abuse by Zoë Quinn, with whom he had briefly cohabited in Winnipeg in 2012. The day following the accusation, the Night in the Woods development team cut ties with Holowka, with Scott Benson writing "We take such allegations seriously as a team". The team stated that other corroborating evidence related to the accusations had been presented to them. The publisher of Night in the Woods, Finji, backed the team's decision, and also postponed plans to publish physical copies of the game in wake of the allegations.

Four days after allegations of abuse were leveled against him, Holowka died by suicide. According to his sister, who posted to Twitter about his death, Holowka had been "battling mood and personality disorders" through his life and "was a victim of abuse". She explained he had been trying to correct his own disorders in recent years through therapy and medication. She also stated that Holowka "said he wished the best for Zoë and everyone else".

== Ludography ==
Date	Title	Role	Notes	Ref(s)
2006	I'm O.K – A Murder Simulator	Audio		
2007	Aquaria	Designer, audio, programmer	Winner of the Seumas McNally Grand Prize at the 2007 Independent Games Festival	
2008	Owl Country	Audio, programmer		
2008	Paper Moon	Co-creator		
2008	Everyone Loves Active 2	Musician		
2009	Crayon Physics Deluxe	Musician	Winner of the Seumas McNally Grand Prize at the 2008 Independent Games Festival	
2009	Das Cube	Co-designer, programmer		
2012	Offspring Fling	Musician		
2013	TowerFall Ascension	Musician		
2017	Night in the Woods	Designer, programmer, musician	Winner of the Seumas McNally Grand Prize, etc. at the 2018 Independent Games Festival	
2018	Oceanheart	Co-creator	Abandoned	
