= Bay Area Science Fiction Association =

- Abbreviation: BASFA
- Formation: 1991
- Type: NGO
- Purpose: Social
- Location: San Francisco, California
- Region served: San Francisco Bay Area
- President: Trey Haddad
- Website: www.basfa.org

Bay Area Science Fiction Association (BASFA) is a science fiction fandom social club. The organization was founded after a committee meeting for the SiliCon science fiction convention in 1991 by several Bay Area convention organizers (SMOFs) looking for a reason to meet other than at committee meetings. The club has met weekly since 1991, at various locations in the southern portion of the San Francisco Bay Area.

== Organization ==
BASFA has an elected president, vice-president, treasurer, and secretary, who serve until a new election is called or until that official has missed thirteen consecutive meetings. Terms of service often last several years uninterrupted.

The club's activities revolve mainly around social meetings held at a restaurant in the San Francisco Bay Area. Meetings themselves involve recreational parliamentary procedure, including official reports, announcements of upcoming events, reviews of books and movies of genre interest, and a meeting-ending "rumor of the week". These, along with the designation of the previous meeting's minutes, tend to be hotly contested battles involving members buying votes. The minutes of BASFA are published in the online magazine Science Fiction/San Francisco.

BASFA contributes yearly lists of recommendations for the Hugo Awards and has hosted appearances by authors such as Tad Williams. The association also regularly runs parties at local and international science fiction conventions. BASFA has been listed in the Locus Magazine online portal since 2002.

BASFA's main sources of income are auctions of donated material and taxation of puns. The club has a "Numismatic Responsibility Act" that taxes members for the making of puns and for erratic marksmanship when paying said taxes.

== Notable members ==
- Christopher Garcia, Hugo Award-winning fanzine writer
- Cheryl Morgan, Hugo Award-winning fanzine writer
- Spring Schoenhuth, Hugo Award-nominated artist
- Kevin Standlee, SMOF and fanzine writer
- Maurine Starkey, Hugo Award-winning artist
- Frank Wu, Hugo Award-winning science fiction artist
