= Wizard101 =

2008 video game

- Developer: KingsIsle Entertainment
- Publisher: KingsIsle Entertainment
- Directors: J. Todd Coleman (2008−2013); Josef T. Hall (2013−2018); William Haskins (2013−2015; 2019−2021); Craig Beers (2019−2021); Leah Ruben (2021−present)
- Artist: Karl Holbert
- Writers: J. Todd Coleman; Josef T. Hall; James Nance
- Composer: Nelson Everhart (Note: Additional music by Nick Jonas, Mark Packard, Krys Kozlowski, and Dennis Bestafka)
- Engine: Gamebryo
- Platforms: Microsoft Windows, Mac OS X, Chromebook, Xbox, PlayStation 4, Xbox One, PlayStation 5, Xbox Series X/S, Nintendo Switch
- Release: NA: September 2, 2008; AU: March 3, 2009; EU: February 15, 2011
- Genre: Massively multiplayer online role-playing game
- Mode: Multiplayer

Wizard101 is a 2008 massively multiplayer online role-playing game (MMORPG) developed and published by KingsIsle Entertainment. Players take on the role of student wizards who must save the Spiral, the fictional universe in which the game is set, from various threats. Players battle enemies by casting spells using a variety of different weapons in a turn-based combat system, similar to collectible card games.

Pirate101, a second MMORPG set in the same universe, was released in 2012.

== Gameplay ==
Screenshot of a player in The Commons, Wizard City during the Yuletide holiday season before the graphical update in 2020

The fictional universe of the Spiral is divided into many worlds, each of which has multiple areas. The worlds of the Spiral are islands suspended in midair within spheroid atmospheres. For example, the first world in the game, Wizard City, is a university city based around the Ravenwood School of Magical Arts, which players join at the start of the game.

Players can unlock all areas temporarily via a paid subscription or unlock each area permanently with the game's premium currency "Crowns". A wizard first starting the game must choose a school: Fire, Ice, Storm, Myth, Life, Death, or Balance, each complete with their own set of unique spells and playstyles.

Fire wizards specialize in damage-over-time effects and other damaging spells. Ice wizards are much more defensive, in exchange for having a low damage output. Storm wizards specialize in high burst damage, but have a lower health pool compared to other wizards. Myth wizards specialize in summoning large amounts of minions to assist them in the battlefield. Life wizards specialize in healing spells and high-accuracy damage spells. Death wizards specialize in debuffs and stealing HP from enemies. Finally, Balance wizards specialize in buffs and debuffs to all allies and enemies respectively. There also exist other schools of magic such as Sun, Moon, Star, and Shadow, but these cannot be selected as a main school on character creation and require training points to be invested into.

The game is based around "duels": two teams made up of one to four players or computer enemies on each team who take turns casting spells. Spells can be cast using "pips". A player gains one pip every round, and there is a chance that that pip will be a "power pip", worth two regular pips based on a percentage from the player's gear for spells that are of the player's class. Spells can reduce the health of enemy creatures, increase the health of players or their allies, add shields that damage, add blades or traps that modify the amount of damage done, and more. When a player reduces a computer enemy's health to zero, they are defeated; players with a health of zero can be healed by others on their team unless they "flee" the duel. When every player or computer on a team has zero health, the other team wins. When the players win a battle, they earn rewards, which are distributed randomly.

As the player progresses, more worlds become available. There are many main worlds, with a few smaller side ones that are optional. When wizards level up, they gain new badge titles and automatic increases in their base statistics: health, mana, and energy. Most equipment also has level restrictions. Hobbies such as training pets, fishing, and gardening require energy; crafting instead requires various resources called "reagents". Players can duel each other in the PvP arena and some houses. As of November 2026, players can achieve a maximum level of 190 in Ahmarra.

== Plot ==
=== Arc 1 (Wizard City, Krokotopia, Marleybone, Mooshu, and Dragonspyre) ===
Merle Ambrose, the headmaster of Ravenwood school, summons the player character to the world of Wizard City. He explains that Malistaire Drake, the school's former Death Professor, has been driven mad by the death of his wife Sylvia and pursues unknown but dangerous methods to resurrect her. As the Wizard foils Malistaire's plots throughout Wizard City, they learn that Malistaire seeks the ancient "Krokonomicon" on the world of Krokotopia.

The wizard travels to Krokotopia to find the Krokonomicon, only to learn that an expedition from Marleybone has taken it to their world. The Wizard travels there and aids detective Sherlock Bones in foiling the schemes of the O'Leary gang, in exchange for access to the Krokonomicon. Meanwhile, Malistaire breaks the infamous thief Meowiarty out of Newgate Prison in exchange for retrieving the Krokonomicon. The Wizard pursues them and defeats Meowiarty, but Malistaire escapes with the Krokonomicon.

Ambrose tracks Malistaire's trail to the world of Mooshu, where Malistaire has seriously wounded their Emperor and used his spiral key to enter the world of Dragonspyre. The Wizard defeats the four cursed Onis of Mooshu to heal the Emperor and earn the key to Dragonspyre. The player and Malistaire's brother, Myth professor Cyrus Drake, pursue Malistaire to Dragonspyre. They learn that Malistaire intends to use the Krokonomicon to awaken the slumbering Dragon Titan and force him to revive Sylvia. Cyrus attempts to use Sylvia's ghost to convince Malistaire to stop but fails, and the player kills Malistaire in a duel. His ghost reunites with Sylvia and departs into the afterlife.

=== Arc 2 (Celestia, Zafaria, Avalon, Azteca, and Khrysalis) ===
The Wizard aids a Marleybonian expedition in exploring the world of Celestia. They eventually encounter the Umbra Queen Morganthe, a former protégé of Ambrose expelled for experimenting with Astral magic, who shares an ominious prophecy. While rescuing exchange students from the world of Zafaria, the Wizard witnesses Morganthe reclaim her "Deck of Shadows" and announce her intention to rewrite the Spiral in her image.

Ambrose sends the Wizard to the world of Avalon to obtain the legendary "Sword of Kings," hoping it can counter Morganthe's power. Avalon's Lady of the Lake aids them in becoming worthy to wield it by attuning to five shrines throughout Avalon. The Wizard pursues Morganthe to the world of Azteca, where she has resurrected Malistaire and imbued him with Shadow magic, and sent a massive meteor, Xibalba, on course to destroy the world and fulfill her prophecy. Although the Wizard narrowly defeats Malistaire, they fail to prevent Azteca from being destroyed.

Aided by allies made throughout their journey, the Wizard infiltrates Khrysalis, Morganthe's adopted home world. The Wizard aids local resistance groups against Morganthe's army, encountering the mysterious Old Cob, who helps the Wizard eventually reach Morganthe's Shadow Palace and best her in combat. Attempting to absorb more power, Morganthe overloads and falls into the depths of space. Having used the Wizard to eliminate his rival, Old Cob orders his "children" to "[m]arry and make war" across the Spiral before departing.

=== Arc 3 (Polaris, Mirage, and Empyrea) ===
After formally graduating from Ravenwood, the Wizard travels to the worlds of Polaris and Mirage, foiling the chaotic schemes of Rasputin and Overlord Xerxes. They are the disguised sons of Old Cob, who is actually Grandfather Spider, lover of Grandmother Raven. Raven chose to forsake her love for Spider and used his heart to create the spiral. Out of spite, Spider intends to reclaim it and destroy the Spiral.

Aided by Mellori, Baba Yaga's adopted daughter, the Wizard learns that the Cabal, secret agents of Spider embedded throughout the Spiral, seeks to help him claim the Sands of Time, which Spider can use to reset time and retrieve his heart. The Wizard defeats Spider but learns that killing him will destroy his heart and thus unmake the Spiral. Mellori reveals herself as Raven's biological daughter and attempts to kill Spider on Raven's orders, but he captures her instead. The Wizard pursues them to the center of the Spiral, Empyrea, created by Raven to seal off Spider's heart.

There, the Wizard allies with Spider's turncoat son, the Bat, and rescues Mellori before she can be weaponized to reach Spider's heart. The trio eventually reach Spider's heart at the same time as Spider and Raven; their hatred and conflict has created the insane "Aethyr Titan," which threatens to annihilate them and the Spiral. The Wizard, the Bat, and Mellori defeat the Aethyr Titan and convince Spider and Raven to forgive each other and exile themselves. In the aftermath, the Wizard is warned of a new threat: "Nothing."

=== Arc 4 (Karamelle, Lemuria, Novus, and Wallaru) ===
In the aftermath of the Empyrea events, the Cabal invites the Wizard for a peace summit in Karamelle. The summit aims to unite various factions under the leadership of the enigmatic Old One. However, things turn dark when a mysterious Cavity swallows the Old One. The other Cabal members blame the Wizard for the appearance of these Cavities. As the story unfolds, the Wizard discovers that the "Nothing"—the same entity Sybil warned about—is behind these Cavities. The Nothing communicates with us through combat, taking the form of the Aberrant Paradox.

Having defeated the Aberrant Paradox, the Nothing assumes the guise of the Old One. It expresses curiosity about our world, and the Spiral, and seeks to understand more. The original Old One had constructed Lemuria using fragments from other worlds, using a powerful device called the world synthesizer. This device was locked away in the Arcanum. The Wizard's mission becomes clear: find the world synthesizer and prevent it from destroying the Spiral. Along this journey, the Nothing, now named Dasein, grapples with the concept of goodness. The Wizard encounters Heroes who play pivotal roles. Ultimately, the Wizard locates the world synthesizer, but the Heroes intend to reshape Lemuria in their image. A climactic battle ensues, and Dasein sacrifices itself by merging with the synthesizer to prevent its destructive activation. We return the device to the Arcanum, where it is destroyed.

Dasein's sacrifice transforms it into a new world—Novus. Shards of Novus appear across various Spiral worlds. Four powerful civilizations—Valencia, Monquista, Marleybone, and Polaris—have already discovered these shards. Each shard reflects the cultural essence of its respective world. Dasein possesses the ability to grant desires, but each civilization seeks something different. Amidst this, the Cabal, including a mysterious member known as the Manticore, tries to manipulate Dasein to restore the First World. The Wizard confronts the Manticore's vision of paradise, the Aeon of Atavus, and defeats it. Dasein grows disillusioned with the conflicting desires of others and rejects the Spiral, reverting to Nothing. The Spiral blames the Wizard for their alliance with Dasein.

The Wizard travels to the Outback-inspired world of Wallaru, becoming involved in its local conflicts and travels through places such as Hope Springs, the Outback, Wobbegong Territory, and the Dreaming. Along the way, the Wizard encounters Freddie Kroaker whose actions create problems for Wallaru and its people. As the Wizard explores the world, they learn about Wallaru's connection to the Dreaming while confronting dangerous creatures, rival groups, and conflicts caused by greed and the desire for power. These experiences also help Dasein continue developing his identity and understanding his responsibility within the Spiral. Eventually, the Wizard helps overcome the major threats facing Wallaru so the summit can finally take place. The story concludes with Dasein hosting the summit where representatives from different worlds gather to settle their disagreements and discuss the future of the Spiral.

=== Arc 5 (Darkmoor, Ahmarra) ===
After the events in Wallaru, the Wizard is drawn to the world of Darkmoor following an attack on the Arcanum and the disappearance of Miranda Briar, a member of the mysterious Broken Branch. Darkmoor is a world of perpetual night ruled by the Parliament of Night, where gargoyles, vampires, were-creatures, and other nocturnal beings dominate society while humans survive as scattered Outsiders. As the Wizard investigates Miranda's activities, they become entangled in a curse spreading through Darkmoor and uncover the secrets of the Scholomance, a forbidden academy whose founder, Balaur, has manipulated the world's Great Houses from the shadows. The Wizard defeats Balaur and prevents the Scholomance's corruption from spreading, but Miranda escapes with a seed of Sybil's Dreamwalking Spell Tree, allowing her to hide herself beyond Bartleby's sight. Although Darkmoor's immediate crisis is resolved, Miranda's plans remain a threat to the Spiral, setting the stage for the Wizard's continued pursuit of the Broken Branch.

== Payment model ==
The game offers a choice of either a subscription or a "Free-to-Play" option with microtransactions. Free-to-Play customers can purchase access to different areas of content using an in-game premium currency called Crowns. Such areas need to be bought only once. Crowns also can be used to purchase exclusive in-game items and access PvP tournaments. Crowns can be purchased with a game card, from the online store or earned in small amounts through SuperRewards.

Subscriptions unlock all playable worlds, as well as allow players to compete in ranked PvP matches and ranked Pet Derby races, enter tournaments for gold, store more items in their backpack, and gain the ability to post on the Wizard101 Message Board, along with other minor benefits for the duration of their membership.

All players, including "Free-to-Play" players, have access to certain areas of Wizard City, including the Commons, Ravenwood, the Shopping District, Olde Town, Triton Avenue, and Triton Avenue's Haunted Cave.

== Online safety features ==
=== Parental controls ===
Wizard101 has various parental controls available that can be managed by a "Master Account" through the game's website. Once a setting is changed on the Master Account, it goes into effect on all connected accounts in a family of accounts. Parental control options include changing the chat settings to restrict the account from certain chat functions.

=== Player chat ===
If a player is under 13 years of age, they are not able to see text messages and are restricted to "menu chat", a selection of phrases that can be used to interact with other players (must have made a debit/credit card purchase). However, with a master password, the parent can allow a child under 13 to use text chat. If the player is 13 years or older, they can send and see text messages, but word filters are in place to censor profanity, numbers, and personal information such as emails or names. Filtered words are marked red while typing, and will be sent as three dots once sent. If the player is 18 years or older and has verified their account via credit card, text messages become much less restrictive, allowing them to see and type some words that are usually filtered, though some are still restricted. Filtered words that are generally restricted by 13+ text chat are visible to 18+ chat, and are marked yellow.

=== Names ===
A player's name must be decided through predetermined names made up of a first name and a one-part or an optional two-part surname. Players can change their name or gender one time using an in-game shopkeeper for 100 Crowns.

== Development history ==
Development history of Wizard101
Location	Release date	Status	Language
North America	September 2, 2008	Active	English; Spanish; French
Europe (Gameforge)	February 15, 2011	Closed May 16, 2022	English; Spanish; French; German; Italian; Polish; Greek
Europe (KingsIsle)	May 16, 2022	Active	English; Spanish; French; German; Italian (Note: As of September 2024, Italian, Polish and Greek are no longer supported.); Polish; Greek
Taiwan	April 27, 2012	Closed October 15, 2015	Traditional Chinese
China	April 27, 2012	Closed November 1, 2015	Simplified Chinese

The development of Wizard101 began in 2005, soon after the founding of KingsIsle Entertainment. Company founder Elie Akilian hired J. Todd Coleman, who served as creative director of the game from its launch through 2013. The game entered open beta on August 6, 2008, and it launched successfully on September 2, 2008. On August 25, 2010, it was announced that Wizard101 would be released in foreign territories later that year.

Wizard101 launched a European Beta version on December 16, 2010, and then released the game on February 15, 2011, in partnership with Gameforge. This eventually included releases of the game in English, French, Italian, Spanish, German, Polish, and Greek. It was announced on August 17, 2011, that KingsIsle Entertainment and Taomee Holdings Limited had an agreement to launch Wizard101 in China, Taiwan, Hong Kong, and Macau. Wizard101 Taiwan officially launched on April 27, 2012, with the others to follow.

The Chinese version of Wizard101 had changes made to the game to conform with laws or appeal to the gaming culture in the country. Any references to skeletons or death had to be censored or removed. Quests required more monsters to be defeated or more items collected. The game would suggest players take breaks if playing for long periods and after two hours, or the player will enter a "fatigued" state, where rewards and stats are cut in half, and after five hours, the "unhealthy" state would cut all rewards given completely.

In 2012, KingsIsle Entertainment released Pirate101, a sister game of Wizard101, also set in the 101 universe. It was described as "comfortable and familiar" to Wizard101, but featuring "entirely new design, setting, and gameplay mechanics".

In 2014, Taomee no longer advertised Wizard101. In April 2015, Wizard101 Taiwan announced that it would shut down on May 25, 2015, but the date was rescheduled to October 15, 2015. Wizard101 China announced its shutdown date as November 1, 2015.

In September 2018, to celebrate the game's 10 year anniversary, the game was given a separate re-release on the gaming platform, Steam. Prior to the ten-year update, the graphics for Wizard City, the starting area of the game, were revamped along with the character models and animations. When the update did appear on September 8, 2018, players were able to get two housing items and a wand (sparkler) to celebrate the ten years. To get one of the housing items, the players are forced to go on a short quest, in which the company, Kingsisle Entertainment, thanks to the supporters of its game through the use of well-established characters in the game. This was a limited-time event, which ended shortly before November 2018.

On February 15, 2022, both KingsIsle and Gameforge announced that the European Wizard101 servers would slowly transition to the KingsIsle and gamigo teams over the course of several months in the second quarter of 2022. It is "assured that game progress and Crowns balance will be maintained after the switch".

The console versions of Wizard101 were released on October 9, 2025, for Xbox One, Xbox Series X/S, PlayStation 4, and PlayStation 5, with a Nintendo Switch version following on January 13, 2026. The console launch received a response far exceeding KingsIsle's expectations, resulting in server queues and requiring additional server hardware to accommodate the influx of players. In October 2025, Wizard101 ranked third among free-to-play games on the PlayStation Store's PS5 and PS4 download charts in the United States and Canada. By February 2026, the game had surpassed one million downloads across console platforms and had briefly reached the top of the Nintendo Switch download charts.

=== Music ===
In 2008, composer Nelson Everhart was asked to write the music for Wizard101. The team initially asked him to compose a Harry Potter-style track, which got him the job. That music eventually became the score for Marleybone.

In 2010, the second world Celestia was released. As cross-promotion for Selena Gomez & the Scene's recently released single "Round and Round" and upcoming album A Year Without Rain, a questline for the popstar was made and players who completed it were given a statue and portrait of Gomez. The questline has since been removed.

In 2011, a campaign centered around a "mystery composer" was launched in anticipation for Wizard101's upcoming Wintertusk expansion. It was finally revealed that Nick Jonas was the mystery composer. He worked with KingsIsle for two months, writing a total of seven atmospheric tracks for Wintertusk.

As of 2022, Everhart still actively composes music for the game's expansions.

== Reception ==
Reception

Aggregate score
Aggregator	Score
GameRankings	77.50%

Review scores
Publication	Score
GameShark	B
About.com	4.5/5

According to KingsIsle Entertainment's press releases, the game has experienced a steady growth in the number of accounts: 2 million in April 2009, 5 million in September 2009, 10 million players by June 2010, 15 million by January 2011, 20 million by July 2011, and 30 million by July 2013. As of November 2014, there are currently about 50 million accounts created.

The game currently scores an average of 77.5% from ratings on GameRankings. GameShark reviewer Toni Dimayuga noted the game's overall ambiance and graphic setting as well as the overall fun nature of Wizard101 in the pro column, while the combat (in particular defeats) and the perceived restrictive nature of chat were criticized.
