= Eternal Daughter =

2002 video game

- Publisher: Blackeye Software
- Designers: Derek Yu; Jon Perry
- Composer: David Saulesco
- Engine: Multimedia Fusion
- Platform: Microsoft Windows
- Release: June 21, 2002
- Genre: Action-adventure
- Mode: Single-player

Eternal Daughter is a freeware 2D action-adventure game created by indie developers Derek Yu and Jon Perry and released on June 21, 2002, under the Blackeye Software label.

== Plot ==
The introduction shows the Dungaga, an imperial industrialized race, conquering the more spiritual Lorian race. The protagonist, Mia, is the daughter of the Lorian priestess and an unknown father. Like the rest of her people, she is enslaved to do menial labor under the supervision of her half-brother Hume. As she sees her Dungaga stepfather Gar hit her mother, she manifests a light-based magic that she uses to strike down Gar. At her mother's advice, she flees the village.

In her travels, Mia meets the enigmatic lizardlike Shulin, the slime-based Grodol warriors, a familiar baby dragon named Elanduru, and several Dungaga dissidents. It is revealed that the Dungaga are controlled by the three sons of the dark god Baphomet, who wish to summon him into the world. After defeating the three sons, Mia must rally the free people of the world and obtain the blessing of the five gods, in order to strike out into Baphomet's realm and defeat him.

== Gameplay ==
The Lorian Forest, an early part of Eternal Daughter's game world

Eternal Daughter is considered a metroidvania, where the player explores an open world, with certain areas unreachable until they acquire a useful skill or item. Its gameplay is based on a classic video game style: side-scrolling platform action, but with added features such as secondary weapons and growth elements that are otherwise common in the genre of role-playing games. Items found throughout the game increase the strength of the player character's weapon, or the player's maximum number of health points. Also, as the game progresses, the player gains new abilities that can be used to explore areas of the game that were previously unreachable, progressively "unlocking" new locations within the game world.

== Music ==
A large part of the music was composed by Swedish video game composer David Saulesco. Like the game itself, the score uses a number of influences from famous video game soundtracks, most notably Final Fantasy VII. Eternal Daughter was Saulesco's first video game soundtrack, produced when he was 16 years old. The soundtrack was released on Saulesco's Bandcamp under the Creative Commons license CC by-nc-sa 3.0 on January 11, 2011.

== Reception ==
1UP highlighted the game's unique visual style and level of polish, not usually seen in freeware games. Both reviews commented on Eternal Daughter's "harsh-but-fair" difficulty level. In 2006, 1UP.com included Eternal Daughter in a list of the 101 best free games on the Internet.
