= James D. Sachs =

American computer programmer

James D. Sachs (born 1949) is a retired United States Air Force veteran, video game artist and game programmer.

Sachs was the lead artist on the groundbreaking Amiga computer game Defender of the Crown from Cinemaware (first published in 1986). He is also the author of the Commodore 64 game Saucer Attack. He is also the author of the CompuTrainer 3D software, aquarium simulation screensaver SereneScreen Marine Aquarium, and of the user interfaces and start-up animations of the Amiga CDTV and Amiga CD32.

Some time after finishing development of Defender of the Crown, Sachs began working on a video game adaptation of the 20,000 Leagues Under the Sea. Unable to secure from Disney the rights for a game based on their 1954 film, Sachs instead based his design on the original 1870 book by Jules Verne, Twenty Thousand Leagues Under the Seas, but was ultimately unable to secure funding.

In early November 2026, streaming service provider Roku announced that it would be removing its licensed version of Marine Aquarium, titled Aquatic Life on December 1, 2026. Sachs revealed that he himself pulled the license to use the screensaver on moral grounds following Roku's acquisition by Fox Corporation.

== Personal ==
As of 2026, Sachs was living in Oregon.
