= Brianna Wu =

American video game developer (born 1977)

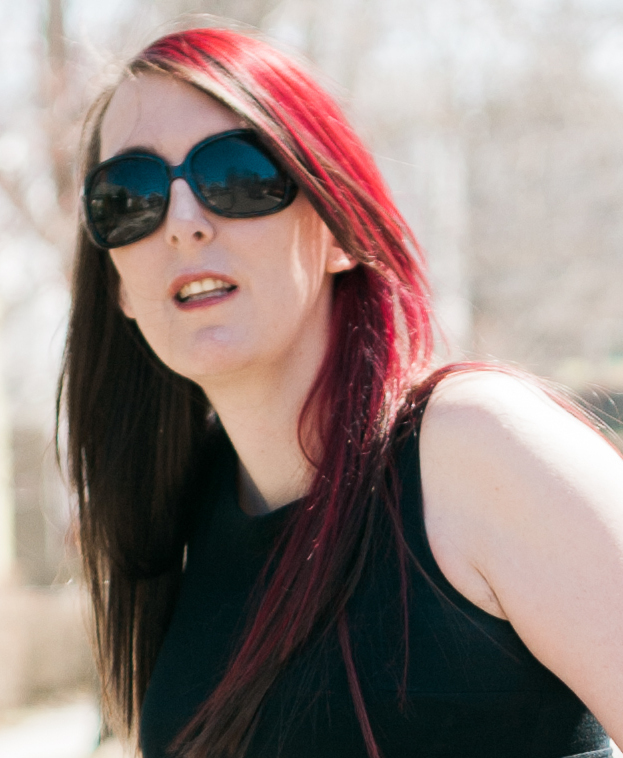
- Wu in 2015
- Born: July 6, 1977 (age 49); West Virginia, U.S.
- Occupations: CEO of Giant Spacekat; software engineer
- Known for: Commentary on issues related to women in gaming
- Political party: Democratic
- Spouse: Frank Wu

Brianna Wu (born July 6, 1977) is an American video game developer and computer programmer. She co-founded Giant Spacekat, an independent video game development studio, with Amanda Warner in Boston, Massachusetts. She is also a blogger and podcaster on matters relating to the video game industry.

In 2018, Wu unsuccessfully ran for Congress in Massachusetts's 8th congressional district. Wu began a second campaign for the primary in 2020; in April, she announced her departure from the race due to fears about the spread of COVID-19.

== Early life and education ==
Wu was born in West Virginia and raised in Hattiesburg, Mississippi, by adoptive parents. Her father was a retired US Navy doctor who opened his own clinic and her mother ran a series of small businesses. She enrolled at the University of Mississippi, studying journalism and political science and writing for The Daily Mississippian, but left in 2001 without a degree.

== Career ==
At the age of 19, Wu formed a small animation studio to create an animated pilot episode. The venture was unsuccessful, resulting in her withdrawal from college and a move to Washington, D.C., to work in political fundraising for several years. She later worked as a journalist until she was inspired by the release of the iPhone to work as a graphic designer and create a video game.

In 2010, Wu co-founded the company Giant Spacekat with Amanda Stenquist Warner. Wu was co-host of the weekly Isometric podcast on Relay FM. The podcast ran from May 2014 to April 2016 and covered the video game industry. The same hosts, including Wu, started a new podcast called Disruption on Relay FM, covering technology and culture.

=== Revolution 60 ===
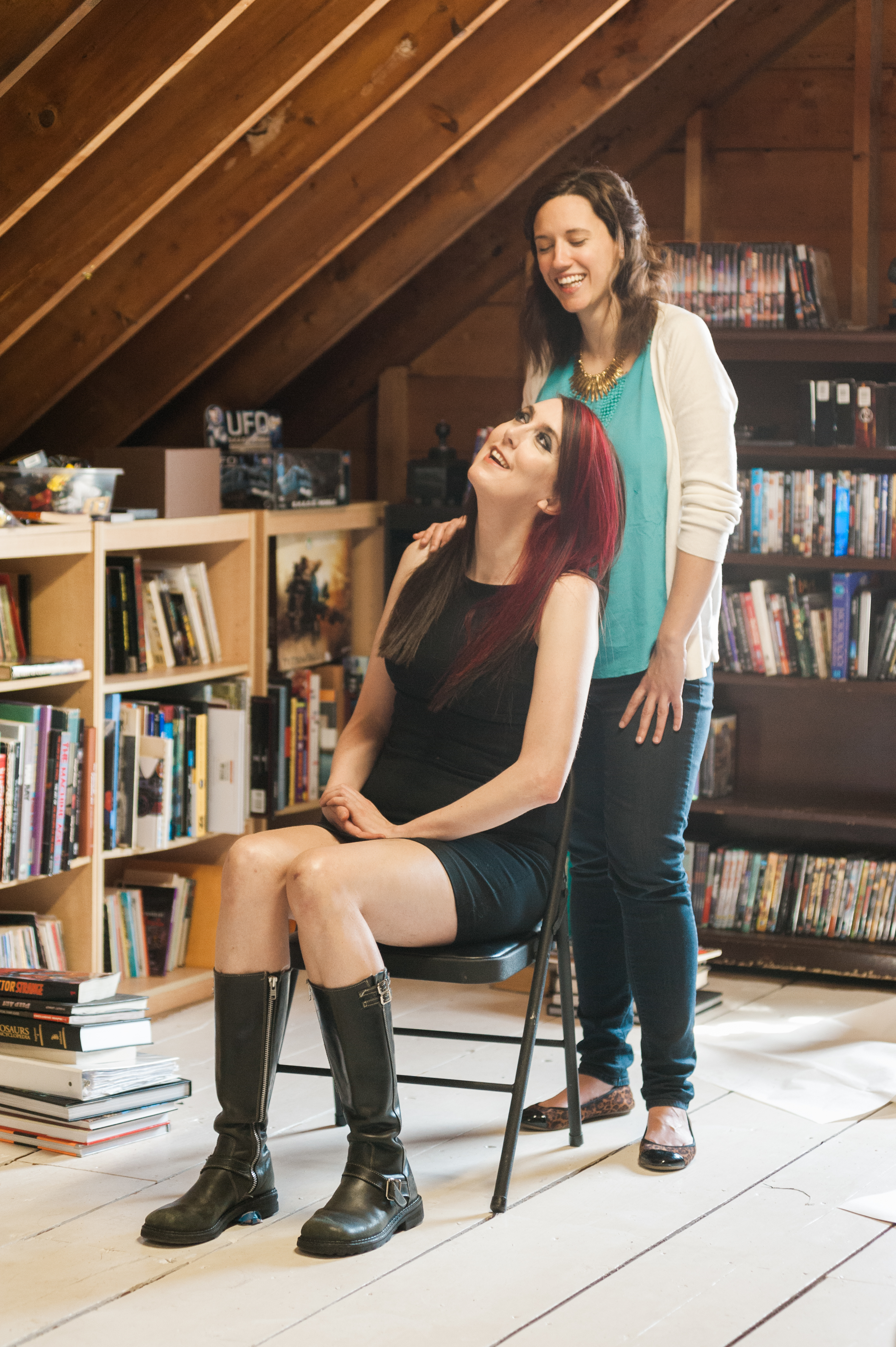
Brianna Wu and Giant Spacekat co-founder Amanda Warner (2015)

Wu is credited as head of development for her company Giant Spacekat's game, Revolution 60. It features female protagonists, said to echo the founders of the game studio. The game was demonstrated at PAX East in March 2013, where it was listed as one of the 10 best indie games of the conference. The game, created with the Unreal Engine for a total budget of several hundred thousand dollars, was released for iOS devices in July 2014. In September 2016, a special edition of Revolution 60 was released on Steam and iOS.

=== 2018 congressional bid ===
Wu decided immediately after the 2016 United States presidential election to run for a congressional seat in the greater Boston area, focusing in part on privacy rights and online harassment, but also on the wider Massachusetts economy. She challenged Rep. Stephen F. Lynch of the 8th district, in an announcement she made on Twitter. Wu stated, in a radio interview, that Lynch did not sufficiently represent the Democrats, citing his positions on reproductive health care and LGBTQ rights; Lynch is a centrist on the former and supportive of the latter. Wu also came out in favor of unions and collective bargaining. Wu feels that Massachusetts proportionally contributes more to the federal government than it receives in return and wants to use it as leverage in negotiations. She hopes that the Boston Bay area can rival San Francisco Bay as a technology hub. Wu moved to the 8th district in order to challenge the incumbent Lynch.

Wu cited opposition to then-president Donald Trump, what she perceived as failures by Congress on technology issues, and what she perceived as the failure of the Democratic Party to emotionally connect with its voters as reasons for shifting from game development to politics. On Twitter in February 2017, Wu received media attention after she posted warnings about the militarization of space, along with voicing her concerns over giving private space tourism companies sole access to the Moon. She wrote, "Rocks dropped from [the Moon] have power of 100s of nuclear bombs". She later deleted the tweets after receiving criticism.

In late October 2017, Wu used the streaming service Twitch to raise awareness for her congressional campaign. This appears to be the first instance of anyone using Twitch in this manner. "One of the reasons Millennials feel disenfranchised is politicians don't speak to them in ways that feel genuine," said Wu. "Twitch is one of the most important ways to engage younger people." When asked, neither Twitch, the DNC, nor the Pew Research Center were aware of anyone having had done so. Wu was playing Wolfenstein II: The New Colossus during the stream. Wu lost to Lynch in the Democratic primary held on September 4, 2018, having received approximately 23% of the vote to Lynch's 71%.

=== 2020 congressional bid ===
Wu began a second campaign against Lynch for the 2020 election, again with an emphasis on tech issues such as Elizabeth Warren's proposal to break up giant new media companies such as Apple, Facebook and Google. On a WGBH-TV panel, Wu said, "for whatever reason, our Department of Justice has been more reluctant to pursue antitrust cases against companies in the last few years, certainly since the Bush years." She differs from certain elements of Warren's proposal, citing privacy concerns. She endorsed the Green New Deal, legislative goals aimed at shifting the United States to 100 percent renewable energy by 2035. In April 2020, due to the impact of the COVID-19 pandemic on her campaign, she suspended her congressional bid. Specifically, she feared one of her staffers or supporters could catch the virus.

== Political views ==
Since the outbreak of the Gaza war, Wu has received media attention for her strong support of Israel. She has argued in The Boston Globe that "my fellow leftists are betraying our Jewish allies" and "the casual antisemitism I'd looked past in progressive spaces became impossible to ignore." By 2026, The Forward was describing Wu as "a vocal critic of the progressive left." Following a stabbing at the Central Synagogue in Manhattan, Wu criticized New York City Mayor Zohran Mamdani, replying "Do you think your non-stop demonization of Jews could have anything to do with it?" to Mamdani's post condemning the stabbing, referring to Mamdani's opposition to Israel. The perpetrator of the stabbing was a supporter of Israel who had shared content critical of Mamdani on social media.

Wu has stated the transgender movement's efforts to include transgender women in women's sports, which she considers an overreach, have unintentionally helped Republican anti-trans initiatives garner more political support. Wu claimed that "lunatic trans activists" were the "biggest obstacle to trans healthcare". She has also used transphobic slurs. In 2025, Wu apologized for suggesting that gender-affirming care to minors be restricted, writing, "Trans sisters, I was wrong. ... I genuinely thought that as a trans woman, if [I] ceded some points with the gender critical crowd we could have a healthier conversation and arrive at better public policy ... The problem is, they are getting crazier and more extreme... They are incapable of looking for a middle ground on bathrooms. They want maximalist policies on everything." Wu subsequently responded to a trans journalist who rejected Wu's apology by referring to her as "male-brained".

== Personal life ==
In 2008, she married Frank Wu, four-time winner of the Hugo Award for Best Fan Artist. In 2020, she and Cenk Uygur co-founded Rebellion PAC, a political action committee with a focus on running advertisements in opposition to Donald Trump and in support of progressive get-out-the-vote efforts. She is a trans woman.

=== Gamergate-related harassment ===
In October 2014, Wu posted multiple tweets about Gamergate advocates, ridiculing them for "fighting an apocalyptic future where women are 8 percent of programmers and not 3 percent." While she was monitoring 8chan's pro-Gamergate chanboard (/gg/), anonymous users posted sensitive personal information about her, including at least one post containing her address. Subsequently, Wu began receiving multiple, specific rape and death threats including her address, causing Wu to flee her home. These threats have been widely attributed to Gamergate supporters. In December, Wu said that she had received emails that contained images of mutilated dogs from people who identified as Gamergate supporters, following the recent death of her dog.

Along with Anita Sarkeesian and Zoë Quinn, Wu was one of the targets of Gamergate harassment. In February 2015, she said, "by attacking me so viciously, they're helping give me the visibility to usher in the very game industry they're terrified about." Wu started a legal defense fund for women targeted by Gamergate. As of late 2014, the Wu family was also offering a cash reward for information leading to the prosecution of those who sent the death threats. By February 2015 she said she was spending a full day a week contacting law enforcement, and was only attending events in the US with a security detail. In March 2015, she said she had received 48 death threats during the previous six months. As of May 2019, she and her husband were still living under aliases.

In early 2017, the Federal Bureau of Investigation (FBI) closed its investigation of the matter. The FBI identified four men who sent threats and obtained confessions from two of them, one of whom stated that they had sent the threat as a "joke" but "understood that it was a federal crime to send a threatening communication to anyone and will never do it again". The U.S. Attorney for the District of Massachusetts declined to prosecute, giving no specific reason. Reacting to the report, Wu stated the FBI did not care about the investigation and that she was "livid". In the wake of the 2019 Poway synagogue shooting, however, she said that the FBI needs dedicated agents who understand online culture (8chan in particular).

In August 2021, The Washington Post reported that "despite the attempts to discredit her, wreck her career and destroy her sense of safety, Wu has now become a vocal proponent of forgiveness for those who apologize and show they have grown" but that "insults and continued harassment" still outnumbered apologies "10-to-1". Wu said that she was diagnosed with post-traumatic stress disorder as a result of the harassment.
