= J. Todd Coleman =

American computer game designer

Jeffrey Todd Coleman is an American computer game designer and businessman. He is known for Shadowbane, released in 2003, and Wizard101, released in 2008. He was a founder of Wolfpack Studios, which was purchased by Ubisoft. He also worked at KingsIsle Entertainment in Austin, Texas. On February 1, 2013, Coleman resigned from KingsIsle Entertainment to pursue other interests. He was most recently the Creative Director of the Kickstarter-backed MMORPG Crowfall.

== Biography ==
Coleman was raised in Westlake, Texas. In 1985, he was selected to be a gamemaster on a dial-up adventure game known as Scepter of Goth. In college, he and his friends (Josef Hall, James Nance, and Patrick Blanton) were pioneers in text mudding. Together, they created and ran ChaosMUD, a DikuMUD derivative. Coleman's first commercial endeavor was a database tools and technology company called Reliant Data Systems, which was sold in 1999 to Compuware Corporation.

Coleman, along with Josef Hall, James Nance, Patrick Blanton and Robert Marsa, created the virtual world company Wolfpack Studios and created the game Shadowbane. Wolfpack Studios was sold in early 2003 to Ubisoft, which assumed control of the Shadowbane game service and ran it until July 1, 2009. Coleman is the co-creator (with Hall) of Wizard101, a massively multiplayer online role-playing game created by KingsIsle Entertainment.

In May 2009, May 2010, and March 2011, he was named one of the most influential people in online gaming by Beckett Massive Gamer magazine. In November 2009, he was named one of the top 50 most influential game developers by Game Developer magazine.

On April 25, 2012, Coleman announced KingsIsle Entertainment's new release, Pirate101, a game made corresponding to Wizard101. On January 25, 2013, Coleman announced that he would be leaving KingsIsle Entertainment. On February 1, 2013, Coleman resigned from KingsIsle Entertainment.

In January 2015, Coleman announced Crowfall, an MMORPG, with ArtCraft Entertainment Inc. Its Kickstarter campaign raised $1,766,204 from 16,936 backers. The game was released on July 6, 2021.
