= Pirate101 =

2012 video game

- Developer: KingsIsle Entertainment
- Publisher: KingsIsle Entertainment
- Directors: J. Todd Coleman (2012−2013); Josef T. Hall (2014−2015); Leah Ruben (2021−present)
- Artist: Melissa Preston
- Writers: J. Todd Coleman; Sam Johnson; David Beau Paul
- Composer: Nelson Everhart (Note: Additional music by Bobby Menkedick)
- Engine: Gamebryo
- Platforms: Windows, macOS
- Release: October 15, 2012
- Genre: MMORPG
- Mode: Multiplayer

Pirate101 is a 2012 massively multiplayer online role-playing game (MMORPG) developed and published by KingsIsle Entertainment. It is a sister game to Wizard101, set in the same fictional universe of the “Spiral”. The player assumes the role of a pirate, who, after being rescued from a prison ship, begins searching for pieces of a map that could take them to the mythical, long-lost world of El Dorado. The player is in a race to reach it with Kane, the game's main antagonist.

Players can complete quests, sail ships, recruit companions, and battle enemies in a turn-based combat system similar to those used in board games.

== Overview ==
The fictional universe of the Spiral is divided into several worlds, each consisting of multiple areas. The worlds of the Spiral are islands suspended in midair within spheroid atmospheres. The first world in the game, Skull Island, is a cluster of jungle islands which serves as a pirate haven. Ships in the game sail and make port in midair. The open skies between islands are referred to as “Skyways”.

The game's content is divided into numerous "Books", which are further subdivided into individual "Chapters". Players may purchase access to all areas related to a given Chapter using "Crowns", the game's premium currency. Purchasing a membership grants unlimited access to all Chapters for a limited time. Upon character creation, players are given free access to "Introduction" and "Prologue Part 1", the first Book.

Side activities in the Spiral include Practice PvP (player versus player), Ranked PvP, a nautical gauntlet, training pets, pet sparring, and housing.

== Characters ==
Players can interact with, trade with, fight, and obtain quests from different NPCs located throughout the worlds of the Spiral. Companions can serve the player in combat and also provide comic relief during the story.

Pirate101 has several types of in-game characters. Two non-player characters (NPCs) in the game, Boochbeard and Mr Gandry, serve as the player's voiceover guide when the player encounters certain aspects of the game for the first time, such as being defeated in combat. They appear in the game's prologue, with the player never physically encountering or observing them again.

The Armada is an army of humanoid clockwork pirates who invade and dominate many worlds of the Spiral. It is led by Kane, Supreme Commander of the Armada, a superintelligent humanoid clockwork whose primary goals are to reach El Dorado, make himself immortal, and then proceed to destroy the Spiral in order to recreate it in his image.

== Plot ==
The game opens with the player character, a young pirate orphan, being recused and then escaping from an Armada-operated prison ship in Skull Island. The first section of the game involves the player completing various quests for Captain Avery, an extremely wealthy retired pirate who is the owner and steward of the entire Skyway. The player does quests for Avery in order to earn their keep, eventually being sent on a quest to discover pieces of a map that could lead them to El Dorado, a long-lost world made entirely of gold. The Armada, meanwhile, is racing the player to obtain the same map pieces.

The player travels to various worlds of the Spiral—such as the imperial China-themed MooShu and the American frontier-themed Cool Ranch—in search of the map pieces. Eventually, after the player collects three of the seven map pieces and the Armada collect two, the player confronts and defeats the Armada leader Kane, although his greatest creation Queen escapes, and the player receives a message from their parents' ghosts telling them to abandon their quest for El Dorado, and that they are proud of them for saving the Spiral.

A second arc of the game (still in development) starts with the player rescuing Sinbad (who then joins their crew) and performing various adventures with him, until it is interrupted by another message from their parents warning vaguely about a shadow coming for El Dorado, and revealing that their previous message was a forgery. The player then travels to two different underworlds (Tartarus and Duat) in order to investigate what is happening to their parents, eventually revealing another enemy racing them to El Dorado, who leaves them an ominous warning.

== Companions ==
Depending on the class chosen for the player's character, as well as other choices made in character creation, different companions will be assigned to the player. For example, if a player chooses the Witchdoctor class, they will fight alongside Kan Po of the MooShu Five and Mormo of the Kraken Skulls Five. If they choose "shipwrecked" as their parent's death in character creation, the player will be able to fight alongside Lucky Jack Russell of the Presidio Five. Other companions are reserved for one class only. There are currently, however, nine major companions that all players have the capacity to gain access to as they progress through the story. These companions are prominent enough to shape the plot directly, and many have their own story lines within 'promotion quests.' After the completion of these quests, involved companions often gain a new title, outfit, ability, or some combination thereof. Companions have the ability to aid the player in combat.

== Payment model ==
The game offers a choice of either subscription or "free-to-play" with microtransactions. Free-to-play customers can purchase access to different Chapters of content using in-game currency called Crowns. Players who purchase a subscription may adventure through all playable worlds and are also able to gain access to various miscellaneous benefits.

== Player interaction ==
Players may duel each other in open arenas known as the "Brawlin' Hall" and the "Spar Chamber", which allows for up to four players on two opposing teams to participate in player-versus-player combat. Most houses in the game also come with duel arenas as well, in which the number of players who can fight at once varies depending on the house.

Players can also participate in a trading system of Doubloons, which are powers that may be used once within a battle. Doubloons can be reorganized in the ability interface and may be discarded during battle in order to draw newer Doubloons. Pirates can trade equipment, housing items, mounts, or pets. A system of pet morphing is also available for players.

Loot drops are provided by chests which appear at the end of battles, the combined loot of which is distributed equally among the players who won the battle.

=== Online safety features ===
Due to its young core audience, Pirate101 restricts player interaction more than other games in the massively multiplayer online genre. Parents must activate controls for players under 13, including allowing interaction with other players in the world. There are three different types of chat: menu chat, open chat, and text chat. At the most restricted level, players select from a menu of predefined phrases, and players using this option can only see menu chat from other players. At the next level, players may type what they want, as long as the words are available in the game's dictionary. If a word is not present in the dictionary, or part of a forbidden phrase, such as asking another player's age, it will not be visible. The official game forums are filtered and moderated.

Other features have been designed with a preteen audience in mind; for example, defeated opponents in combat disintegrate or vanish bloodlessly. Character names are restricted to a preselected list from which players must choose. The game does include the use of weapons such as guns and magic; however, the guns shoot electricity rather than bullets. Also, the enemies in player versus enemy combat are not depicted as human: each world has its own type of enemy, i.e., the Bison and Birds of Cool Ranch, or the Dogs and Cats of Marleybone.

== Reception ==
Reception

Review scores
Publication	Score
MMORPG	8.1/10 stars
Gamezebo	4/5 stars

Awards
Publication	Award
RTSGuru	Best Hybrid Strategy (2012)
MMORPG	Game of the Year (2012).

According to a KingsIsle Entertainment press release, Pirate101 had five million registered users in October 2013, matching the first year success of Wizard101. In a review of the game, Suzie Ford of MMORPG noted the game's bright aesthetics and commended its use of strategic turn-based gameplay; however, she considered the micromanagement of units overwhelming for kids, making the combat system too complicated for children. Nick Tylwalk of GameZebo said that the helpful interface makes combat very clear and is of great assistance to children. Karen Bryan of Massively said that KingsIsle Entertainment had succeeded in making a complex enough system to challenge players without over-complicating it.

Two months after the release of Pirate101, the game won the Player's Choice Award for Game of the Year from MMORPG with 27.8% of the vote, edging out Guild Wars 2 by just 0.5% of the total votes cast.
