= Saucer Attack! =

1984 video game

- European cover art
- Publisher: Sachs Enterprises
- Designer: James D. Sachs
- Platform: Commodore 64
- Release: 1984
- Genre: Shoot 'em up
- Mode: Single-player

Saucer Attack! is a shoot 'em up written by James D. Sachs for the Commodore 64 and published by Sachs Enterprises in 1984. The goal is to protect Washington, D.C. from invading flying saucers.

== Gameplay ==
Screenshot

The game presents a backdrop of Washington, with various landmarks such as the Washington Monument visible. Flying saucers descend from the top of the screen. The player has to move a crosshair at the saucers and fire bullets to destroy them. If allowed to proceed unharmed, saucers will hover near a famous landmark and shoot a beam of electricity at it, eventually destroying it. If all landmarks are destroyed, the game is lost.
