= Revolution 60 =

2014 video game

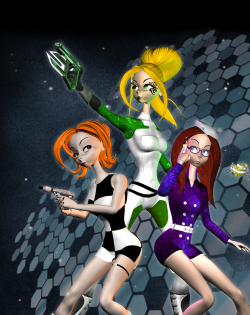
- Developer: Giant Spacekat
- Publisher: Giant Spacekat
- Engine: Unreal Engine 3
- Platforms: iOS; Microsoft Windows; OS X
- Release: iOS; July 12, 2014; Remastered; Windows, OS X August 6, 2016
- Genre: Adventure
- Mode: Single-player

Revolution 60 is an adventure video game developed and published by Giant Spacekat for iOS. The story is centered on a team of four women working in an anime-themed special forces unit, attempting to liberate a space station.

Giant Spacekat first announced Revolution 60 at PAX East in March 2013. Originally targeted to release in late 2013, the development schedule was extended. In July 2013, the company ran a Kickstarter campaign, asking for $5,000 to port the game to PC and Mac, in addition to iOS with the release targeted for August 2014. The game was released for iOS in July 2014. It received mixed reviews for its story and gameplay by critics, but won the 2014 iOS Action Game of the Year award from iMore.

== Setting and plot ==
Revolution 60 is set in a future world where rising political tensions have grown between the United States and China, and space has undergone major militarization. The story follows an all-female special operations team deployed by Chessboard, a U.S. special operations agency, being sent on a mission to a U.S. orbital weapons platform named N313 after it drifts off course due to malfunction, posing a potential political incident.

The mission is led by the commander Minuete "Min" Kiley. The team also includes Allison Holiday, a highly skilled assassin and the main player-controlled character; Amelia Melpomene, the engineer of the team and one of the architects behind N313; and Valentina “Val” Guazzo, the lieutenant also known by the callsign “Unknown.” As the team disembarks onto the station and investigates the station’s systems with the aim of reestablishing control with the onboard AI, they begin to uncover secrets about a rogue AI, Crimson 09, and the true cause of the station’s drift.

Initially, the team believes they have been sent to N313 by the agency Chessboard to prevent a potential global crisis that could occur due to the station's malfunction. However, as the mission progresses, Holiday and her team gradually discover a far more sinister truth: the team has been manipulated by Crimson 09, a rogue artificial intelligence onboard the station, who intercepted communications and crafted a fake mission directive to lure them aboard the station.

Crimson 09’s true goal is to trick the team into rebooting her systems, allowing her to be set free and escape from N313. She also seeks to pursue revenge particularly against Amelia, who had previously been the one to trap Crimson in N313. The mission, the orders, and the objective were all fabrications, orchestrated by Crimson disguised as Chessboard to ensure her own freedom.

This revelation causes tensions to rise among the team, especially between Minuete who begins behaving unpredictably under Crimson’s influence, and Amelia. Depending on player choices, this leaves Holiday to decide whether to side with Minuete or Amelia.

Gameplay unfolds through a mix of narrative decision-making and real-time combat sequences, where the player’s choices influence Holiday’s personality, relationships, and her path — classified as “Professional” or “Rogue."

The story branches based on these decisions, culminating in one of 24 endings in total, though all converge around the same critical turning points. The game explores themes of loyalty, betrayal, conflict between characters, the ethical dangers of AI and the consequences of political manipulation in a tech-dominated future.

== Gameplay ==
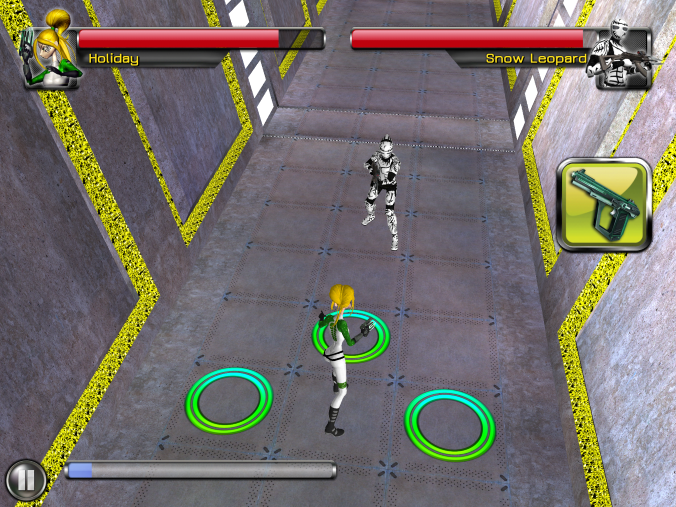
Revolution 60 grid-based combat system

Revolution 60 combines multiple game elements, focused on a touch-based system on iOS. The player mainly controls the character Holiday. Exploring is based on paths outlined by circles on the screen. By touching a circle on the screen the player can explore the appropriate area of the weapons platform. When dialog occurs, the player is offered a choice as to what the protagonist will say. What the player chooses affects aspects of Holiday's character.

Combat is grid-based and occurs in real-time. Holiday starts with a single melee and ranged attack, with successful hits building up a power bar that unlocks a special attack. The opponent will utilize one of several melee or ranged attacks. Both opponents can move within the grid, though Holiday is restricted to the first 2 rows. Completing combat awards experience points to Holiday which unlocks options within a talent tree.

In-combat special moves and particular events within the storyline trigger a quick time event, requiring the user to follow a shape on the screen in iOS, but in the upcoming Windows version it will be similar to the approach used in The Typing of the Dead.

== Development ==
Production of Revolution 60 began in 2011, approximately a year after developer Brianna Wu met animator Amanda Stenquist-Warner through an advertisement on Craigslist. The initial version of the game was to be a top down turn-based strategy, along the lines of Final Fantasy Tactics, although Wu chose a change in direction to a 3D game after seeing Infinity Blade.

After briefly hiring contractors, Wu and Stenquist-Warner hired Maria Enderton as lead developer and technical artist, who had been a school friend of Warner's. Wu's husband Frank provided designs for the spaceships (including the armored transport Xiezhi, the Dragonchild fighter ship, and the Death Lotus capital ship) as well as the space station N313. Jenna Hoffstein, a freelance developer, designed the combat system from the ground up. Ex-Harmonix employee Carolyn VanEseltine refined the combat system, upgrade system, and overall difficulty curve.

During development, Wu provided a development diary, initially through App.net then through her Twitter account. She would outline difficulties faced such as designing a talent tree suitable for seasoned gamers and newcomers. Not wanting to alienate core parts of the market, VanEseltine organized a testing pool of players in order to best represent their intended market, equally splitting "self-described gamers" with casual gamers and between men and women. Wu said some men in the test group were "very antagonistic and negative toward choices and tweaks that made the game inclusive to everyone else".

In July 2013, the company ran a Kickstarter campaign, asking for $5,000 to port the game to PC and Mac, in addition to iOS. The fundraiser brought in $12,728. Wu acknowledged her dislike of microtransactions, and wanted the balance between a one-off cost yet still allowing players to try the game. Wu, who described the sci-fi themed action-adventure as "Heavy Rain meets Mass Effect", was credited as head of development. Wu described the art style as inspired by Space Channel 5 and Sailor Moon. Reflecting the almost all-female development team, the game features an all-female cast, which The Guardian noted is "a rarity on mobile platforms". Amanda Winn-Lee provided voice acting, after Wu had been impressed by her previous anime performances.

Wu developed characters that could be considered "attractive and strong," but didn't feel the need to make them "kid-safe or desexualized." Because of feminist criticism, Wu declared the characters' figures for the sequel to Revolution 60 would be more realistic, saying, "Having learned to draw from anime is not a great basis for running a studio that's held up as a poster child of feminism. To say it bluntly, I screwed up... I think we can do better portraying body types going forward."

In January 2015, Wu announced that the game would be on Steam Greenlight. She mentioned that the PC version would allow the player to type the emotions they experience from the game. The PC port was released on September 6, 2016.

=== Technical ===
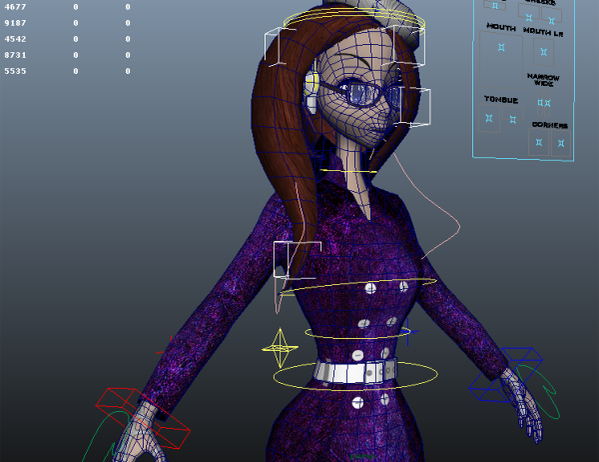
A mesh render of Amelia, one of the main characters in Revolution 60

Revolution 60 was developed on Unreal Engine 3 using UnrealScript, with Autodesk Maya used for animation before porting it into the Unreal Development Kit.

Due to a desire to include a rich storyline, emphasis was placed on character expression with more detail in the face and hair to avoid having to express emotion solely though "a bunch of gesticulation". While this allows for more emotion and communication in the cut-scenes a trade-off occurred due to hardware limitations, requiring less detail on the body of the game characters. This was the primary factor in the design decision to employ the "skin-tight suits".

The game was initially written around a film-style screenplay; however, based on feedback at PAX 2013, it was considered overly-reliant on long cutscenes and was rebuilt around continuous interaction.

== Reception ==
Game critics on review aggregator Metacritic gave "mixed or average reviews" for a combined score of 73/100 based on eight reviews. On game review site GameRankings the game has a 71.67% rating based on six reviews. Macworld praised the game, calling it "the most ambitious iOS game you'll play this year". Kotaku's review was also positive, remarking, "as the credits rolled for Revolution 60... I felt the familiar pang of loss I feel whenever a great game ends." RPGFan called the game "an absolute winner". iMore listed it as the "iOS Action Game of the Year" in 2014, saying that "the modeling is gorgeous, the animation delightful, the music engrossing, and the voice acting outstanding".

Response from other outlets were also more mixed. TouchArcade praised the plot, but argued the game "[failed] to deliver in terms of gameplay". Pocket Gamer said that the gameplay was "variable", adding that it can have an odd effect on the pacing of the game. Paste called it "an interesting, if underwhelming, melange of elements you'd be hard-pressed to find in another game, let alone one on a mobile platform."

== Sequel ==
Giant Spacekat stated there will be a sequel titled Revolution 62, where many of the original characters would reappear. The sequel was planned to use the Unreal 4 engine. A male Chinese-American character called Chase was also slated to appear in the sequel. No updates have been issued on the status of Revolution 62 since 2015.
