= Shadowbane =

2003 online fantasy role-playing video game

- Developers: Wolfpack Studios (2003–2006); Stray Bullet Games (2006–2009)
- Publisher: Ubi Soft
- Platforms: Windows, Mac
- Release: NA: March 25, 2003; EU: January 16, 2004; NA: December 9, 2003 (The Rise of Chaos); NA: December 7, 2004 (Throne of Oblivion)
- Genre: MMORPG
- Mode: Multiplayer

Shadowbane was a free-to-play fantasy role-playing video game (MMORPG) created by Wolfpack Studios and published on March 25, 2003 by Ubisoft for Microsoft Windows and Mac OS X platforms. Originally commercial and subscription-driven, Shadowbane was launched in March 2003, and was the creation of text-MUD veterans J. Todd Coleman, James Nance, Josef Hall, Patrick Blanton and Robert Marsa and a team of 45 programmers, designers and artists. It closed on July 1, 2009.

Shadowbane was a top-10 best selling PC game at launch, and had two noteworthy aspects. First, the majority of the game world allowed for open player versus player combat, making it an early pioneer title in the PvP MMO genre. Second, it was the first major MMO to offer dynamic world content as a primary feature of the game. Most MMOs were static, meaning the world itself did not change based on player actions. Dynamic worlds allowed player to change the game world itself; morphing terrain, building and destroying buildings and fortifications, and setting up patrol paths for player-hired AI combatants. The game was considered a "cult hit" and sustained a small base of followers, but technical issues plagued the game at launch and failed to retain much of the early fanbase shortly afterward.

After the sale of Wolfpack Studios to Ubisoft in March 2004, the live service was transitioned to a new management and (largely new) development team, led by Frank Lucero and Ala Diaz. This team later splintered off to become Stray Bullet Games in June 2006, and Mark Nuasha was brought in to run the organization. In March 2006 the game was made free-to-play. A system of short ads was introduced on March 6, 2007 to fund operating costs, which were displayed when the game was opened or closed and when a character died (with at least 10 minutes between death ads). All servers were closed on March 19, 2008 to prepare for the "Shadowbane Reboot", a relaunch of the game to capitalize on stability and performance gains hindered by previously existing data. All player characters and cities were deleted in this reboot. On March 25, the fifth anniversary of the game's launch, two servers were brought online followed by a third due to overpopulation. The game was closed in July 2009.

The regular game took place in a dark fantasy world called Aerynth (the world sometimes depended on the servers, many of which had unique world maps). Gameplay featured many aspects typical of role-playing video games, such as experience points, character classes, and fantasy races. Character creation was fairly extensive, allowing for detailed, differentiable characters to be created.

== Gameplay ==
Shadowbane was notable for emphasizing player-versus-player combat, implementing non-conventional races and specializing in siege warfare (players building cities and trying to raze enemy players' cities) whereas a significant number of MMORPGs released since Ultima Online usually restrict player killing to certain areas of the game or special dedicated PvP servers. The game also featured a seamless world map, and made no use of instancing.

Players were also allowed to own cities and capitals and most of the property and cities in Shadowbane were player owned. In effect, Shadowbane's war status was decided by the players rather than the game company. Whether a guild city went to war with another guild city was entirely up to the leaders. A government system was also implemented in the game. It ensured players were in total control of the Shadowbane world.

Though there were no quests in the game, Shadowbane featured PvP, Nation, and Siege Warfare systems, which offered players a wide range of in-game opportunities. There were twelve races available in the game. There were four basic classes; Fighter, Healer, Mage and Rogue. Not all races could use every class. At 10th level, each character had to choose to promote to a specific profession, such as a Ranger or Assassin. Two classes, Fury and Huntress, were for female characters only whilst the Warlock was for male characters only. Which professions were available was dependent on the race, gender and base class of the character. In addition, each character could take up to four disciplines, from a list of over thirty, though as with Professions, access was limited by race, class and current profession. The level hard cap was level 75, and until level 70 the fourth discipline slot was locked.

After shifting to free to play system, Ubisoft used an ad-based revenue generation system consisting of short ad videos at game start, game close and character death. Ads played on character death were limited to no more than one instance in ten minutes.

== Closure ==
Shadowbane was shut down on July 1, 2009.

In April 2012, Chinese gaming company Changyou acquired the intellectual property rights and source code to Shadowbane with the intent of developing a new version of the game, which was titled World of Shadowbane.

== Revival and second closure ==
Around April 2020 Changyou announced that Shadowbane was going to re-launch. first two-week test server opening on April 29 and second month-long test server opening on May 20. Then in 2024 Changyou announced that the services will close and Shadowbane would cease operations on May 28 2024.

== Reception ==
Shadowbane

Aggregate score
Aggregator	Score
Metacritic	75/100

Review scores
Publication	Score
Computer Gaming World	4/5
Game Informer	6.75/10
GameSpot	7.9/10
GameSpy	4/5
IGN	7.3/10
PC Format	57%
PC Gamer (UK)	70%
PC Gamer (US)	75%
X-Play	3/5

The original Shadowbane received "generally favorable" reviews, according to video game review aggregator Metacritic. The game sold over 120,000 units by the end of March 2003.

=== The Rise of Chaos ===
Shadowbane: The Rise of Chaos

Aggregate score
Aggregator	Score
Metacritic	54/100

Review scores
Publication	Score
Computer Gaming World	2.5/5
GameSpot	4.7/10
GameZone	6.8/10
IGN	6.3/10

The Rise of Chaos received "mixed" reviews, according to video game review aggregator Metacritic.
