= Crowfall =

2021 video game

- Developer: ArtCraft
- Publisher: ArtCraft
- Director: J. Todd Coleman
- Composer: Nelson Everhart
- Engine: Unity
- Platform: Windows
- Release: July 6, 2021
- Genre: MMORPG

Crowfall was a massively multiplayer online role-playing game-real-time strategy game developed by ArtCraft, described as a "Throne War Simulator". It released on July 6, 2021. Its Kickstarter campaign ended March 26, 2015 with a total funding of $1,766,205, surpassing its original $800,000 goal by $966,205. As of June 20, 2016 the total funding has reached $7,210,680 which includes an amount of $2,726,322 from pledges collected from both the Kickstarter campaign and donations taken on the Crowfall website.

== Gameplay ==
Accurate as of 2017: The game plays similarly to most MMORPGs, with the camera in a third-person view with the player allowed to go anywhere. Where it differs is in the game's world system. There are five systems of worlds, also known as campaigns. The systems are "Eternal Kingdoms", "God's Reach", "The Infected", "The Shadow", and "Dregs", each with a different set of rules dictating them. Each world is also procedurally generated, and goes through a cycle of life and death, starting with spring to summer, fall, and ending with winter. At the end of winter the campaign ends, and the world is gone forever, though the players will remain, allowed to travel to other worlds. Campaigns can last for 1, 3, or 6 months, to a year. The only worlds that persist are the Eternal Kingdoms, where player housing is.

There are a number of different characters or archetypes in the game consisting of a mixture of humans, demi-humans and animal-hybrids. The archetypes include Champion (melee dps), Ranger (specialist), Druid (support), Confessor (ranged dps), Knight (tank), Templar (tank), Forgemaster (specialist), Frostweaver (ranged dps), Assassin (specialist), Myrmidon (tank), Legionnaire (support), Duelist (specialist) and Stalker (ranged dps).

At the start of a campaign (this is the MMORTS part), players spawn in the newly created world during spring, filled with villages, mines, gatherable resources, and ruins. The world map is clouded by fog, meaning players will have to explore to discover its geography. With the resources they gather, players are able to craft weapons and build castles and fortresses for defense against the other players and wildlife. As summer begins, resources become more scarce, and the world's monsters become more and more powerful. This continues with each season, the force doing this being called 'The Hunger' in the game's lore.

Depending on the world, there are a different set of campaign victory conditions, along with the rules of the world itself changing depending on the campaign. After the campaign is over, players may go back to their homes in the Eternal Kingdoms, where there are its own set of rules as well.

== Development ==
The game was announced in January 2015 under much speculation and mystery. Very little information was given, with only a 40-day countdown timer and very few aspects of gameplay discussed on its website. When the counter finally reached zero, the site had a link to the game's official Kickstarter page, with gameplay videos and many aspects of the game finally revealed. In a matter of hours, the Kickstarter was halfway towards its eight hundred thousand dollar goal.

The game released on July 6, 2021. It was taken offline on November 22, 2022.

== Reception ==
Reception

Aggregate score
Aggregator	Score
OpenCritic	58/100

Review scores
Publication	Score
IGN	5/10
PC Gamer (UK)	64/100
