= Paul Eibeler =

American businessman

- Born: July 26, 1955 (age 71); Hicksville, New York
- Education: Loyola University Maryland
- Occupation: Business
- Known for: CEO of Take-Two Interactive; Chairman COKeM International; Trustee Loyola University Maryland
- Spouse: Mary

Paul Eibeler is an American business executive in the interactive gaming industry. Eibeler was best known for his positions as EVP at Acclaim Entertainment, member of the launch team for Microsoft's Xbox, CEO/President at Take-Two Interactive, and Chairman of Cokem Interactive.

== Early life ==
Eibler was born on July 26, 1955, in Hicksville, Long Island. He attended Holy Trinity High School where he excelled in basketball and chose to attend Loyola University Maryland on an athletic scholarship. He was awarded the ECAC Merit Medal in his senior year and graduated in 1978 with a Bachelor of Arts degree. Eibeler began his business career in marketing and sales positions at Black & Decker. He held marketing and sales positions at American Brands, Imagic, and Acclaim..

== Take-Two Interactive ==
In July 2000, Eibeler joined Take-Two Interactive as president and director. In April 2003, he left Take-Two after a medical leave, and returned as president and director in April 2004, replacing Ryan Brant who was subject of an SEC investigation. In February 2005, Eibeler replaced Richard Roedel as CEO. In March 2007, Eibeler resigned as CEO after a proxy battle.

Most notable events during Eibler's management:

- In July 2005, CEO Eibeler oversaw a Federal Trade Commission investigation into advertising practices and claims.
- In July 2005, Eibeler oversaw the rating change of best-selling game Grand Theft Auto: San Andreas from "Mature" to "Adult" and the resulting drop in distribution.
- Take-Two grew from $250 million in revenue to over $1.5 billion, the company's market capitalization increased from $250 million to over $1.5 billion and employee numbers grew from 200 to 2000.
- Take-Two's stock rose 198% from $7.58 per share in July 2000 to $15.01 a share in April 2003. Upon returning in 2004, shares rose 26% from $23.46 in April 2004 to a high of $29.34 in June 2005.

== Other roles ==
Eibeler has provided board and advisory work for BDA, Greenman Gaming, GameFly, Alliance Entertainment, Midway Games, and Solutions2Go.

Eibeler is serving his third term as a trustee for Loyola University Maryland. He is also a 20-year board member for Long Island Alzheimers and Dementia Centers and Holy Trinity High School Principals Committee.

== Personal life ==
Eibeler has been married to Mary for more than 40 years and has three children. He currently lives in Jupiter, Florida.
