= A Modest Video Game Proposal =

2005 open letter by Jack Thompson

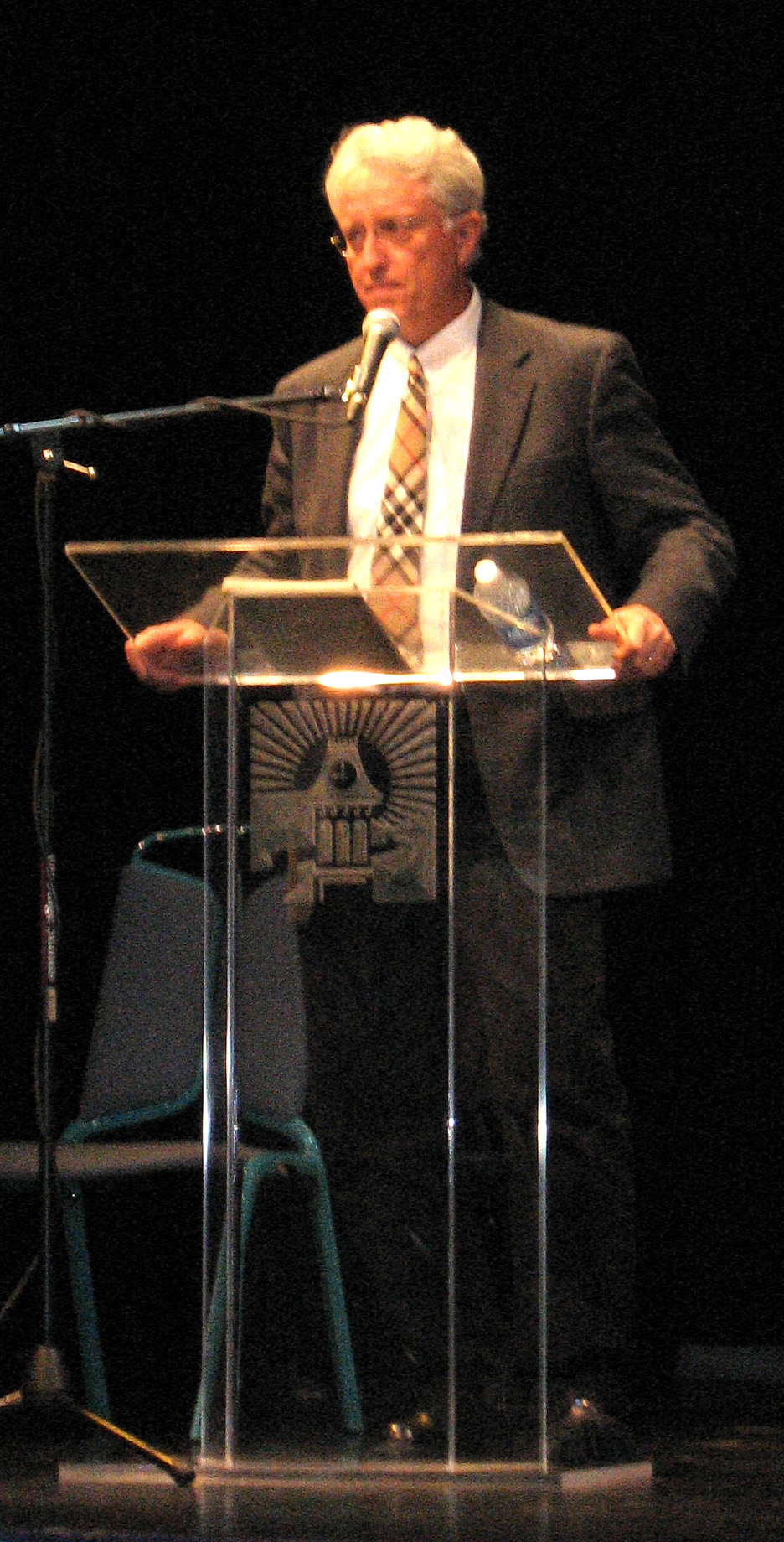
Jack Thompson in 2007

"A Modest Video Game Proposal" is the title of an open letter sent by activist/former attorney Jack Thompson to members of the press and to Entertainment Software Association president Doug Lowenstein on October 10, 2005. He proposed that, if someone were to "create, manufacture, distribute, and sell a video game in 2006" that allows players to play the scenario he has written, in which the character kills video game developers, he would donate $10,000 to the charity of former Take-Two Interactive chairman Paul Eibeler's choosing. The title of the letter alludes to Jonathan Swift's 18th-century satirical essay A Modest Proposal.

Thompson stated that he thought such a game would never be made because developers would be afraid to "train" people to kill them. He was unaware that Running with Scissors had already released a commercial first-person shooter, Postal 2, in which the player could massacre the employees of Running with Scissors, including its CEO, Vince Desi, and actor Gary Coleman. Before that, some games had the game company buildings as Easter eggs, sometimes destroyable by the player (for example, MechWarrior 2 features the Activision headquarters in some levels), and Doom II even had the player essentially kill id Software co-founder John Romero in the final boss battle of the game.

== The "Modest Proposal" ==
Jack Thompson wrote a letter that describes a game whose protagonist is Osaki Kim, the father of a high school boy beaten to death with a baseball bat by a 14-year-old gamer who played a game about beating people to death with a bat. The game intro shows the court session where the killer is sentenced to "only" life in prison.

Osaki Kim then swears vengeance, and gets weapons, "even baseball bats. Especially baseball bats." Kim goes to Long Island to kill Paula Eibel (clear reference to Paul Eibeler), the CEO of Take This, the company that made the "murder simulator on which his son's killer trained", along with her husband and kids, then urinates on their severed brain stems (as in Postal 2) (Take This is a parody of the name Take-Two Interactive, whose developers created the games Grand Theft Auto, Bully, and Manhunt, all of which are games which Jack Thompson lobbied against). Kim then kills the lawyers of Blank Stare, the Philadelphia law firm that defended Take This (a parody of the law firm Blank Rome which is actually based in Philadelphia and defended Take Two in the Strickland v. Sony trial, which originated from a lawsuit filed by Thompson), "with singer Jackson Browne's 1980's hit Lawyers in Love blaring." Kim then destroys high-tech video arcades called GameWerks. Lastly, he goes to E3 on its opening at May 10, 2006, destroying all video game industry execs in "one final, monstrously delicious rampage".

Along the way, Kim steals supplies from Best Buy, Circuit City, Target and Walmart stores, and roughs up store managers and clerks, yelling "You should have checked kids' IDs!"

== Games made ==
=== Defamation of Character: A Jack Thompson Murder Simulator ===
A group of modders known as the Fighting Hellfish (the name is taken from an episode of The Simpsons) had released exactly one week prior a mod for the game Grand Theft Auto: San Andreas, called Defamation of Character: A Jack Thompson Murder Simulator. The mod features Jack Thompson himself acting out a remarkably similar scenario, at one point even assassinating Doug Lowenstein. Acting under hypnosis, Thompson moonlights as Banman and takes to the streets in his "Bannedwagon" to destroy the entire shipment of Rockstar's Bully before it reaches distribution. Jack later assassinates Janet Reno after thwarting her coup, which forces him to confront the realization that his time spent researching violent games has turned him into his own "Manchurian Candidate". Although the team never asked him to donate the money, Thompson refused to when he discovered that the game existed. Initially he claimed that the game did not meet his criteria but later claimed that his proposal was satire and said that he would not donate the $10,000.

Thompson argued that the game had to be released in 2006, that Paul Eibeler had yet to pick a charity, and that the game had to be released by a company, not thrown together by "anyone in a garage". Despite his former claim that his proposal was satire, he claimed the offer was still valid, and that only the description of the scenario was satire, the offer to donate money was real.

=== I'm O.K – A Murder Simulator ===
In response to the "Modest Proposal", a group of independent developers called Thompsonsoft created I'm O.K – A Murder Simulator in January 2006, which was released as a downloadable game for computers.

The content of the game closely follows the description of the "Modest Proposal". The story follows a disgruntled father by the name of Osaki Kim (a fictional character name that Thompson selected in his letter), whose son was murdered and takes his revenge upon the games industry, which he blames for "training" the man who killed his son. Much of I'm O.K is sardonic in nature, poking fun at Thompson's sentiments and demeanor over the gaming industry. Jack Thompson later claimed that the game did not come close to his proposal, although other than the fact that former Take-Two Interactive CEO Paul Eibeler has not officially picked a charity, he has not gone into detail as to what parts of his proposal are yet to be satisfied. He later claimed the game he proposed needed to be produced by an official company and sold commerically. He also announced that "the attorneys for these idiots [sic] will be contacted."

=== Joystiq challenge ===
On April 4, 2006, Thompson commented on the online gaming blog Joystiq, suggesting a game in which the editors and writers for the blog were murdered. Thompson claimed that being targeted would let the writers know what it felt like to be a police officer or a woman after the release of Grand Theft Auto.

Instead, Joystiq actively challenged its readers to develop such a game over the course of several weeks, running a contest with a prize of merchandise as incentive. Photographs of each staff member were provided.

== Response by Penny Arcade ==
On October 17, 2005, Mike Krahulik and Jerry Holkins of Penny Arcade donated the promised $10,000 to charity on Jack Thompson's behalf. Krahulik and Holkins donated the money, under Thompson's name, to the Entertainment Software Association Foundation, the charitable arm of the Entertainment Software Association. Thompson e-mailed both Penny Arcade and Joystiq, who ran a story about the donation, demanding that the articles be taken down "or else". The check was presented to the ESA Foundation at an ESAF fundraising dinner in San Francisco; in its memo line was written: "For Jack Thompson Because Jack Thompson Won't".

In retaliation, Jack Thompson faxed a letter to Seattle Police Chief Gil Kerlikowske, requesting assistance in halting the activities of Krahulik and Holkins. In his letter, he described how personnel within Penny Arcade were harassing him: the sale of an "I Hate Jack Thompson" shirt and frequent postings on their website where they allegedly admitted to harassment.

According to GameSpot, as of 9:55 a.m. PDT October 18, 2005, the Seattle Police Department had not received Thompson's fax, which at that point had been sent to GameSpot, Penny Arcade, and other sites. Thompson emailed GameSpot, claiming that he had fixed the URL for Penny Arcade (which was incorrect in the original fax) and faxed the letter, commenting, "They have it now." Thompson also told GameSpot that he was not a "pixelated piñata in a game". He ended by saying that the "moral midgets" at Penny Arcade had chosen "the wrong target" and "I've been at this longer than he has." These vague threats have been deemed "nothing to worry about" by Penny Arcade. The Seattle Police Department confirmed to GameSpot on October 21 that they had received a complaint from Thompson.

On October 21, 2005, Thompson claimed to have sent a letter to John McKay, U.S. Attorney for the Western District of Washington, in an attempt to get the FBI involved. Thompson reiterated his claims of "extortion" and accuses Penny Arcade of using "their Internet site and various other means to encourage and solicit criminal harassment". Penny Arcade denies the charge of "extortion", noting that they paid the $10,000 to charity, and are asking nothing in return.

Thompson also contacted the office of Washington State Legislature Representative Mary Lou Dickerson, and her office confirms they asked John McKay to look into the matter. Thompson has not clarified how he is being "extorted", but accuses Penny Arcade's Mike Krahulik of soliciting Florida Bar complaints against him through Krahulik posting the Florida Bar's link on Penny Arcade's website. The link, however, is in a post asking fans to stop sending letters to the Bar because the Bar is fully aware of the current situation.

On October 27, 2005, the Seattle PD acknowledged receipt of Thompson's complaint, although after the initial reading of the letter they noted that the complaint appeared to be a civil, rather than criminal matter. They passed the letter on to the chief of their criminal investigations bureau for review.
