= List of banned video games in Australia =

Below is a list and summary of notable video games that have been refused classification (banned) within Australia.

== Overview ==
Under Australian law, all media intended for retail display, such as films, must be reviewed by the Australian Classification Board (ACB, formerly, the Office of Film and Literature Classification (OFLC) until its dissolution in 2006). A work deemed too inappropriate by the ACB may be Refused Classification (RC), banning it from being sold at retail, and placing the work on the Australian Customs and Border Protection Service list of prohibited items. Any copies of such works found at the border will be seized, and the recipient, depending on the number of copies being imported, may receive up to A$110,000 in fines.

Originally, video games within Australia were only rated up to the MA15+ rating. At the time, the R18+ classification rating could only be given to films, but a video game with content deemed fitting for the R18+ rating could be classified as "Refused Classification" due to an appropriate classification not being available for the medium.

In July and August 2011, all Australian state Attorneys-General except the New South Wales state Attorney-General agreed to instate an R18+ rating for video games, which would be available by the end of 2011. Many games previously refused classification would now fit into the R18+ rating and, if the publisher chose to pay the reclassification fee, would theoretically be able to sell their game in Australia. The date was later changed to allow the rating to be introduced at the beginning of 2013.

With the R18+ rating in place, it is expected fewer video games will be given the Refused Classification rating. Games may still be Refused Classification if deemed to contain material unsuitable for R18+ classification, such as depictions of sexual violence or the promotion of illegal drug use, as well as drug use that is related to incentives and rewards. More specifically, games which may be Refused Classification include:

- Detailed instruction or promotion in matters of crime or violence.
- Depiction of rape.
- The promotion or provision of instruction in paedophile activity.
- Descriptions or depictions of child sexual abuse or any other exploitative or offensive descriptions or depictions involving a person who is, or appears to be, a child under 18 years.
- Gratuitous, exploitative or offensive depictions of:
  - (i) violence with a very high degree of impact or which are excessively frequent, prolonged or detailed;
  - (ii) cruelty or real violence which are very detailed or which have an extremely high impact;
  - (iii) sexual violence
- Depictions of practices such as bestiality
- Gratuitous, exploitative or offensive depictions of:
  - (i) activity accompanied by fetishes or practices that are offensive or abhorrent;
  - (ii) incest fantasies or other fantasies that are offensive or abhorrent

Classification is compulsory, and games refused classification by the ACB are banned for sale, hire or public exhibition, carrying a maximum fine of $275,000 and/or 10 years in jail. It is, however, legal to possess RC games (except in Western Australia and prescribed areas of the Northern Territory).

The list depicted below is of games that are either still banned, or were initially banned but have been edited exclusively for Australia. Some of these games were banned before the introduction of the R18+ category; if some of these games were to be re-rated today, they would likely receive the R18+ rating. The second list is of games that have been eventually released unedited, rating appealed or the worldwide edition later being released uncut and being identical to other countries.

Due to the licensing of the International Age Rating Coalition software for developers to rate their own game, several hundred games have been banned from various app stores and due to said games being relatively minor they will not be listed here. There are also uncountable games which have never been submitted to the board in the first place and they are also not listed.

== List of video games refused classification ==
=== Current ===
The list below includes games where the worldwide edition has been banned for sale in Australia because either the game has been refused classification or a classification has been revoked. Games in this list with a current classification are available for purchase in a censored or altered form.

| Name | Original Date of Certification | Reason | Original Rating | Present Rating |
|---|---|---|---|---|
| Halloween: The Game (2026) | 2026-07-02 | Refused classification due to drug use related to incentives and rewards. | Refused Classification (RC) | Refused Classification (RC) |
| Hunter × Hunter: Nen × Impact (2025) | 2024-11-18 | Banned because of implied sexual violence involving minors. | Refused Classification (RC) | Refused Classification (RC) |
| Sympathy Kiss (2022) | 2023-09-11 | Banned due to implied sexual violence that was visually depicted. | Refused Classification (RC) | Refused Classification (RC) |
| Blade Runner: Enhanced Edition (2022) | 2022-05-04 | Banned by IARC for interactive sexual activity involving a person who is, or appears to be, a child under 18 years. | Refused Classification (RC) | Refused Classification (RC) |
| Deathsmiles I & II (2007) | 2022-02-28 | Originally released in 2007, following an upcoming special edition release on the Nintendo Switch the game was banned because of interactive sexual activity involving a person who is, or appears to be, a child under 18. | Refused Classification (RC) | Refused Classification (RC) |
| Mary Skelter: Finale (2021) | 2021-06-16 | Banned because of interactive sexual activity involving a person who is, or appears to be, a child under 18. | Refused Classification (RC) | Refused Classification (RC) |
| Wasteland 3 (2020) | 2020-02-26 | Originally banned because of drug use related to incentives and rewards. A censored version was later rated R18+. | Refused Classification (RC) | Restricted (R 18+) |
| Sludge Life (2020) | 2020-01-23 | Banned for drug use related to incentives and rewards. The game is not available for purchase within Australia via the Online Steam Store, and keys for it cannot be redeemed, as of January 2024. | Refused Classification (RC) | Refused Classification (RC) |
| Super Blood Hockey (2017) | 2019-03-15 | Initially released with an R18+ rating but was later banned through the IARC System because of drug use related to incentives and rewards. | Restricted (R 18+) | Refused Classification (RC) |
| Omega Labyrinth Z (2017) | 2018-02-02 | Banned because of interactive sexual activity involving a person who is, or appears to be, a child under 18 years. | Refused Classification (RC) | Refused Classification (RC) |
| Mother Russia Bleeds (2016) | 2018-08-01 | Banned through the IARC System because of sexual violence and drug use related to incentives and rewards. Developers Devolver Digital then appealed the rating through the Australian Classification board via a manual review and the game once again given the Refused Classification Rating for the same reason it was initially rejected. The game is still available for purchase within Australia via the Online Steam Store, as of May 2022. | Refused Classification (RC) | Refused Classification (RC) |
| The Bug Butcher (2016) | 2016-07-20 | Banned because of drug use related to incentives and rewards. A censored version was later released with an M rating. | Refused Classification (RC) | Mature (M) |
| Valkyrie Drive: Bhikkhuni (2015) | 2016-08-09 | Banned because of implied sexual violence related to incentives and rewards. A censored version was later released with an 18+ rating. | Refused Classification (RC) | Restricted (R 18+) |
| MeiQ: Labyrinth of Death (2015) | 2016-06-21 | Banned because of interactive sexual activity involving a person who is, or appears to be, a child under 18 years. | Refused Classification (RC) | Refused Classification (RC) |
| Hotline Miami 2: Wrong Number (2015) | 2015-01-15 | Banned because of a scene of sexual violence. Devolver Digital reapplied for an International Age Rating Coalition rating ahead of the Nintendo Switch release in August 2019. The game is still banned in Australia, retaining the Refused Classification status. | Refused Classification (RC) | Refused Classification (RC) |
| South Park: The Stick of Truth (2014) | 2013-09-19 | Banned because of scenes of sexual violence involving minors. Those censored scenes involved the underaged main character getting anally probed by aliens, giving an abortion and receiving one. A version was released replacing those scenes with a card of a koala crying humorously explaining what has been cut. | Refused Classification (RC) | Restricted (R 18+) |
| Saints Row IV (2013) | 2013-07-29 | Banned because of implied sexual violence and drug use related to incentives and rewards. An appeal was lodged but failed, though the content involving sexual violence was overturned, the drug use was not. An edited version was released lacking a mission involving "Alien Narcotics". | Refused Classification (RC) | Mature Accompanied (MA 15+) |
| State of Decay (2013) | 2013-06-26 | Banned because of drug use related to incentives and rewards. A censored version that changes the drugs to vitamins was later released with an R18+. | Refused Classification (RC) | Restricted (R 18+) |
| Syndicate (2012) | 2011-12-19 | Banned because of high impact bloody violence. | Refused Classification (RC) | Refused Classification (RC) |
| The Witcher 2: Assassins of Kings (2011) | 2011-04-27 | Banned because of sexuality and nudity in relation to incentives and rewards. A side quest was given an edit (where a choice to accept sex as a reward is automatically turned down) and the game was subsequently re-rated MA15+. | Refused Classification (RC) | Mature Accompanied (MA 15+) |
| Risen (2009) | 2009-07-20 | Banned because of sexual activity and drug use related to incentives and rewards. | Refused Classification (RC) | Refused Classification (RC) |
| Shellshock 2: Blood Trails (2009) | 2008-06-23 | Banned because of high impact bloody violence. | Refused Classification (RC) | Refused Classification (RC) |
| CrimeCraft (2009) | 2009-11-26 | The always-on DRM game was banned because of drug use related to incentives and rewards. The game's servers were shut down in 2017, rendering it unplayable worldwide. | Refused Classification (RC) | Refused Classification (RC) |
| NecroVisioN (2009) | 2009-04-08 | Banned because of high impact bloody violence. A censored version was later released with an M rating. | Refused Classification (RC) | Mature (M) |
| Silent Hill: Homecoming (2008) | 2008-09-22 | Banned because of a high impact torture scene involving drilling into body parts. A censored version was later released with an MA15+ rating, changing the angles of said scene. | Refused Classification (RC) | Mature Accompanied (MA 15+) |
| Dark Sector (2008) | 2008-02-14 | Banned because of high impact bloody violence. A censored version was later released with an MA15+ rating. | Refused Classification (RC) | Mature Accompanied (MA 15+) |
| Manhunt 2 (2007) | N/A | Not officially banned, but the game was never submitted to the ACB over fears that it would be refused classification. | N/A | N/A |
| Soldier of Fortune: Payback (2007) | 2007-10-17 | Banned because of high impact bloody violence. A censored version was later released with an MA15+ rating, disabling the ability to mutilate enemies. | Refused Classification (RC) | Mature Accompanied (MA 15+) |
| Marc Eckō's Getting Up: Contents Under Pressure (2006) | 2005-11-19 | Originally released with an MA15+ rating. Federal Attorney-General Philip Ruddock later appealed the rating, banning it for high impact themes involving the glorification of graffiti. The game is still available to purchase on Steam and has not been removed from Steam as of May 2022. | Mature Accompanied (MA 15+) | Refused Classification (RC) |
| Reservoir Dogs (2006) | 2006-06-24 | Banned because of high impact violence and torture. | Refused Classification (RC) | Refused Classification (RC) |
| 50 Cent: Bulletproof (2005) | 2005-10-25 | Banned because of high impact bloody violence. After an appeal it was Refused Classification once again on 24 November 2005. A censored version was later released with an MA15+ rating. | Refused Classification (RC) | Mature Accompanied (MA 15+) |
| Narc (2005) | 2005-04-09 | Banned because of drug use related to incentives and rewards. | Refused Classification (RC) | Refused Classification (RC) |
| Blitz: The League (2005) | 2007-01-18 | Banned because of drug use related to incentives and rewards. | Refused Classification (RC) | Refused Classification (RC) |
| Leisure Suit Larry: Magna Cum Laude (2004) | 2004-09-09 | Banned because of sexuality and nudity in relation to incentives and rewards. However, it is still available for purchase on Steam as of May 2022, albeit without a classification. | Refused Classification (RC) | Refused Classification (RC) |
| Manhunt (2003) | 2003-10-22 | Originally rated MA15+. Federal Attorney-General Philip Ruddock later appealed the rating in September 2004, banning it because of high impact violence involving torture. | Mature Accompanied (MA 15+) | Refused Classification (RC) |
| Singles: Flirt Up Your Life (2003) | 2004-10-21 | Banned because of sexuality and nudity in relation to incentives and rewards. | Refused Classification (RC) | Refused Classification (RC) |
| The Getaway (2002) | 2002-11-22 | Originally released uncut with a MA15+, it was later resubmitted and banned due to a scene of detailed torture. A censored version omitting this scene was later released with a MA15+ rating. | Mature Accompanied (MA 15+) | Mature Accompanied (MA 15+) |
| BMX XXX (2002) | 2002-10-16 | Banned because of high impact sexual references. A censored version was later released with an MA15+ rating. | Refused Classification (RC) | Mature Accompanied (MA 15+) |
| Enzai: Falsely Accused (2002) | 2009-08-21 | Banned by the Australian Communications and Media Authority because of sexual violence involving a person who is, or appears to be, a child under 18 years. | Refused Classification (RC) | Refused Classification (RC) |
| WANDER LUST (1996) | 1996-06-19 | Likely banned because of sexual activity and/or nudity related to incentives and rewards. The Victorian Police were the applicants for the Refused Classification Rating. | Refused Classification (RC) | Refused Classification (RC) |
| Phantasmagoria (1995) | 1995-08-25 | Banned because of a scene involving sexual violence. In 2016, the game became available for purchase on Steam without classification and has yet to be taken down as of May 2023. | Refused Classification (RC) | Refused Classification (RC) |
| DreamWeb (1994) | 1995-02-09 | Was originally released unrated. Later banned because of a scene of sexual violence. A censored edition was later released with an M rating. Released as freeware in 2012. | Refused Classification (RC) | Mature (M) |
| Voyeur (1993) | 1995-02-09 | Was originally released unrated. Later banned because of high impact sexual themes involving incest. | Refused Classification (RC) | Refused Classification (RC) |
| Porntris (1993) | 1996-05-10 | Banned because of nudity related to incentives and rewards. The Victorian Police were the applicants for the Refused Classification Rating. | Refused Classification (RC) | Refused Classification (RC) |
| Teresa: House Guest (1993) | 1996-07-03 | Banned likely because of sexual activity and/or nudity related to incentives and rewards. The Victorian Police were the applicants for the Refused Classification Rating. | Refused Classification (RC) | Refused Classification (RC) |
| Vida X (1993) | 1996-07-03 | Banned likely because of sexual activity and/or nudity related to incentives and rewards. The Victorian Police were the applicants for the Refused Classification Rating. | Refused Classification (RC) | Refused Classification (RC) |
| Sorority House (1991) | 1996-06-19 | Banned likely because of sexual activity and/or nudity related to incentives and rewards. The New South Wales Police were the applicants for the Refused Classification Rating. The game was refused a second time after an appeal by the games developer 3D Realms. | Refused Classification (RC) | Refused Classification (RC) |
| Strip Blackjack (1991) | 1996-07-03 | Banned because of nudity related to incentives and rewards. The Victorian Police were the applicants for the Refused Classification Rating. | Refused Classification (RC) | Refused Classification (RC) |
| Strip Poker Three (1991) | 1996-07-03 | Banned because of nudity related to incentives and rewards. The Victorian Police were the applicants for the Refused Classification Rating. | Refused Classification (RC) | Refused Classification (RC) |
| Pocket Gal 2 (1988) | 1996-12-23 | Banned likely because of sexual activity and/or nudity related to incentives and rewards. Chien Thon Yeun was the applicant. | Refused Classification (RC) | Refused Classification (RC) |

=== Overturned ===
The list below includes games where the Australian edition is identical to that of other countries because either: the rating has successfully been appealed, the worldwide edition has later been released in Australia unedited ("uncut"), or the game has received a worldwide edit.

| Name | Original Date of Certification | Reason | Original Rating | Present Rating |
|---|---|---|---|---|
| Postal 4: No Regerts (2023) | 2023-03-21 | Banned by IARC for illicit or proscribed drug use related to incentives or rewards. Re-rated R18+ on 6 June 2024. | Refused Classification (RC) | Restricted (R 18+) |
| Song of Memories (2018) | 2018-08-15 | Originally banned because of implied sexual violence. The game was later rated R18+ through the IARC system in 2023. | Refused Classification (RC) | Restricted (R 18+) |
| Hell Pie (2022) | 2022-05-04 | Originally refused classification by the IARC for interactive drug use. Following a review by the Australian Classification Review Board in August 2022, its drug use was found to be justified by context, "the depiction of cannabis within the game, although interactive, is not detailed or realistic.", and was subsequently re-classified R 18+. | Refused Classification (RC) | Restricted (R 18+) |
| Rimworld (2018) | 2022-02-28 | Originally refused classification because of drug use related to incentives and rewards. Following a review by the Australian Classification Review Board in April 2022, its drug use was found to be justified by context, as "the game mechanic ultimately provides disincentives related to drug-taking behaviour, to the point where regular drug use leads to negative consequences such as overdose, addiction, and withdrawal", and was subsequently re-classified R 18+. | Refused Classification (RC) | Restricted (R 18+) |
| Disco Elysium: The Final Cut (2021) | 2021-03-19 | Originally banned because of drug use related to incentives and rewards. Later given an R18+ rating in May 2021 after the Classification Board agreed that player performance showed negative impacts from depictions of drug use. | Refused Classification (RC) | Restricted (R 18+) |
| The Medium (2020) | 2020-07-06 | Originally banned due to References to sexual violence through the IARC System. Rating later appealed and overturned. | Refused Classification (RC) | Restricted (R 18+) |
| Katana Zero (2019) | 2019-04-18 | Originally banned through the IARC System because of drug use related to incentives and rewards. Rating later appealed and overturned. | Refused Classification (RC) | Restricted (R 18+) |
| DayZ (2018) | 2019-06-04 | Originally passed with a MA15+, but was banned upon its PlayStation 4 release because of drug use related to incentives and rewards. Edited worldwide with this edition receiving an MA15+ rating. | Mature Accompanied (MA 15+) | Mature Accompanied (MA 15+) |
| We Happy Few (2018) | 2018-05-21 | Originally banned because of drug use related to incentives and rewards. The game was re-rated R18+ after a review was conducted with input from Gearbox Software, the game's publisher. | Refused Classification (RC) | Restricted (R 18+) |
| Outlast 2 (2017) | 2017-03-15 | Originally banned because of implied sexual violence. The game was resubmitted without the scene and received an R18+ rating. The updated rating reflects the modified version of the game that was later released worldwide. The developer has said that the scene was taken from an 'alpha' version. | Refused Classification (RC) | Restricted (R 18+) |
| Paranautical Activity (2016) | 2016-01-05 | Banned because of drug use related to incentives and rewards. It was then re-classified as M for Mature Themes on January 16, 2016. On 25 April 2018, the game was re-classified as MA 15+ for Strong Themes, this classification has remained since. | Refused Classification (RC) | Mature Accompanied (MA 15+) |
| Hotline Miami (2012) | 2013-05-07 | Originally rated MA15+ on 7 May 2013 by the classification board. It was later re-rated R18+ on 28 May 2015 through the IARC System. On 13 June 2019 it was refused classification through the IARC System after Devolver Digital attempted to get the game reclassified for the release of the Hotline Miami Collection. On 14 May 2022, Hotline Miami received a MA15+ rating. | Mature Accompanied (MA 15+) | Mature Accompanied (MA 15+) |
| The House of the Dead: Overkill Extended Cut (2011) | 2011-08-23 | Originally banned due to high impact bloody violence. Sega successfully appealed the rating on the basis that the over the top violence mitigated the impact. | Refused Classification (RC) | Mature Accompanied (MA 15+) |
| Mortal Kombat (2011) | 2011-03-16 | Originally banned because of high impact bloody violence. The Komplete Edition was later rated R18+ in 2013 after the said rating was introduced. | Refused Classification (RC) | Restricted (R 18+) |
| Aliens vs. Predator (2010) | 2009-12-03 | Originally banned because of high impact bloody violence. Rating later appealed and overturned. | Refused Classification (RC) | Mature Accompanied (MA 15+) |
| Left 4 Dead 2 (2009) | 2009-10-23 | Originally banned due to high impact bloody violence. A version has been released using the same censoring as Germany. On October 7, 2009, the uncensored version was passed with an MA15+ Rating. On 29 August 2014, the rating was raised to R18+. | Mature Accompanied (MA 15+) | Restricted (R 18+) |
| Sexy Poker (2009) | 2009-05-13 | Originally banned because of nudity in relation to incentives and rewards. Edited worldwide with this edition receiving an M rating. | Refused Classification (RC) | Mature (M) |
| F.E.A.R. 2: Project Origin (2009) | 2008-11-27 | Originally banned because of high impact bloody violence. The decision was later appealed on the basis that the violence was unrealistic. | Refused Classification (RC) | Mature Accompanied (MA 15+) |
| Fallout 3 (2008) | 2008-07-04 | Originally banned due to drug use related to incentives and rewards. Edited worldwide due to the small change needed (the name of morphine was changed to Med-X). | Refused Classification (RC) | Mature Accompanied (MA 15+) |
| The Punisher (2004) | 2004-11-23 | Originally banned because of high impact violence involving torture. Edited worldwide due to international trouble (threats of receiving an AO rating in America and being deemed as "objectionable material" in the UK). This edition was passed, receiving an MA15+. | Refused Classification (RC) | Mature Accompanied (MA 15+) |
| Grand Theft Auto: San Andreas (2004) | 2004-10-01 | Had its classification revoked on August 16, 2005, following the Hot Coffee controversy. Edited worldwide with this version of the game also achieving an MA15+. | Mature Accompanied (MA 15+) | Mature Accompanied (MA 15+) |
| Shellshock: Nam '67 (2004) | 2004-06-22 | Originally banned because of sexual violence and drug use related to incentives and rewards. Edited worldwide with this version receiving an MA15+ rating for Medium level animated violence, Adult themes, Sexual references and Drug references. | Refused Classification (RC) | Mature Accompanied (MA 15+) |
| Silverball: Product Version 8 (2003) | 2003-11-21 | Originally banned because of sexuality and nudity in relation to incentives and rewards. Rating was later appealed and re-rated to an unrestricted M on the basis that the nude static images were incidental to gameplay rather than as a reward. | Refused Classification (RC) | Mature (M) |
| Postal 2 (2003) | 2005-10-14 | Originally banned due to "high impact" violence. In October 2013, the game was given a R18+ rating after a request from the Australian Communications and Media Authority (ACMA), and listed for sale on digital storefronts. However, since Postal 2 was never submitted for re-classification by the game's publisher, it technically remained banned and was removed from digital storefronts in April 2024. In July 2024, the game was submitted again, and was re-rated with an MA15+ classification, officially lifting the ban after nineteen years. The game has been available for purchase on Steam as of June 2025. | Refused Classification (RC) | Mature Accompanied (MA 15+) |
| Grand Theft Auto III (2001) | 2001-11-28 | Originally released uncut with an MA15+, it was later banned due to sexual violence involving prostitutes. A censored version lacking the ability to pick up prostitutes was later released with an MA15+. On 26 September 2019, a version restoring the use of prostitutes was rated R18+. | Mature Accompanied (MA 15+) | Restricted (R 18+) |
| Tender Loving Care (1998) | 1998-07-30 | Originally banned because of high-impact sexual references and nudity. Later submitted as a DVD due to being more of an interactive live-action movie than a videogame. Due to being under different guidelines it was re-rated MA15+. | Refused Classification (RC) | Mature Accompanied (MA 15+) |
| Postal (1997) | 1997-11-04 | Originally banned because of high impact themes involving depictions of revolting and abhorrent content. In December 2019, game was released as freeware and is available on the Australian versions of Steam and GOG.com On 5 April 2020, the remastered version, Postal Redux, was passed through the IARC System with an MA15+. | Refused Classification (RC) | Mature Accompanied (MA 15+) |
| Duke Nukem 3D (1996) | 1996-05-02 | Originally banned because of sexual violence. Later released uncensored with an MA15+ rating. | Refused Classification (RC) | Mature Accompanied (MA 15+) |

== See also ==
- Australian Classification Board
- Australian Classification Review Board
- List of banned video games
- Censorship in Australia
- Video gaming in Australia
