= Mondo Medicals =

2007 video game

- Designer: Jonatan Söderström
- Engine: Game Maker
- Platforms: Windows, Macintosh
- Release: Windows: WW: September 13, 2007; Macintosh: WW: December 24, 2010
- Genre: Puzzle
- Mode: Single-player

Mondo Medicals is a freeware puzzle and indie game developed by Jonatan Söderström, released for Microsoft Windows on September 13, 2007 and later for macOS on December 24, 2010. The game involves the player trying to reach an exit in several mazelike levels by solving counterintuitive puzzles, against the backdrop of a surreal narrative revolving around the search for the cure for cancer.

The game saw recognition in the indie game community and was praised for its unique artistic style and atmosphere, though it was also criticized for its repetitiveness.

== Plot ==
Opening cutscene

In the opening cutscene, a character greets the nameless protagonist, who is stated to have applied to participate in researching the cure for cancer. It is then explained that the protagonist must first undergo a test. The game proper then begins.

== Gameplay ==
One of the cutscenes shown after each level

Each of the levels is a featureless, gray maze. The player, seeing the action in first-person view, must navigate to the exit. Doing so often involves deliberately disobeying instructions and overcoming unusual, counter-intuitive puzzle-solving challenges; for example, the first level is a looping corridor with arrows painted on the floor. Following the arrows leaves the player going in circles. The player must disobey the arrows and go backwards to find the exit.

After the completion of each level, a short cutscene is shown which depicts a recording of a man loudly ranting, with his incomprehensible speech subtitled in ungrammatical English. Throughout his strange rants, the man tells how he has lost his father to cancer, which has driven him to devote his life to find a cure to the disease, only to finally realize that the only way to cure cancer is to "shoot it". In the game's final level, the protagonist finds himself in a room with the man previously seen in the cutscenes, who exclaims "I will cure you, cancer!" before shooting the protagonist.

== Development ==
Mondo Medicals was created by the Swedish indie game developer Jonatan "cactus" Söderström, known for creating highly unusual games, who had already gained notoriety with his 2008 game Clean Asia!. It was developed within 72 hours as an entry for a contest on the indie games forum TIGSource. The contest, bearing the theme "B-Games", challenged participants to create "bad games with great personalities". While most other contestants created deliberately ridiculous games, Söderström decided he wanted to create a game that, while bizarre, could be taken seriously. The basic concept was to keep the player constantly deceived, with the entire game being deliberately enigmatic and cryptic in order to leave a lasting impression on the player beyond just entertaining them.

The movies of the director David Lynch, known for his surreal films such as Eraserhead, were a major inspiration for the game. The dialogue was partially influenced by the games Portal and Killer7, as well as The Man from Another Place character from the TV series Twin Peaks. While initially the cutscenes were meant to provide verbally abusive commentary on the player's progress through the game, Söderström eventually decided to instead make them follow a semi-coherent narrative.

== Reception ==
Mondo Medicals was largely praised by video game journalists. Critics have commented on the game's confusing atmosphere and deliberately rough art style, and recommended the game for fans of horror and puzzle games. Retro Gamer's Stuart Hunt gave the game an 85% rating in his review, praising the eerie atmosphere, but criticizing the repetitive and monotonous level design.

Mike Rose included the game in his book 250 Indie Games You Must Play. GameRadar's Lucas Sullivan compared Mondo Medicals to the later game Antichamber and described it as "the most fun you've ever had during an anxiety attack", while Jim Rossignol listed it among various "artsy games", calling it "an Eraserhead of gaming".

== Legacy ==
A sequel to the game, Mondo Agency, was released on December 23, 2007. Another sequel was in development as of 2009, titled Mondo Wires; Söderström also planned a compilation of all three games into an unified release, titled Mondo Nation. Mondo Medicals was later released as part of the game compilation Cactus Arcade. December 24, 2010 saw the release of a Macintosh port created by Leon Arnott.
