= Hotline Miami 2: Wrong Number =

2015 video game

- Cover art featuring "Beard", drawn by Niklas Åkerblad
- Developers: Dennaton Games; Abstraction Games
- Publisher: Devolver Digital
- Designers: Jonatan Söderström; Dennis Wedin
- Programmer: Jonatan Söderström
- Artist: Dennis Wedin
- Writers: Jonatan Söderström; Dennis Wedin
- Platforms: Windows; OS X Linux; PlayStation 3 PlayStation 4 PlayStation Vita: Nintendo Switch; Xbox One; Stadia; PlayStation 5; Xbox Series X/S
- Release: 10 March 2015: Linux, OS X, PS3, PS4, Vita, Win; 10 March 2015; Switch; 19 August 2019; Xbox One; 7 April 2020; Stadia; 22 September 2020; PS5, Xbox Series X/S; 23 October 2023
- Genre: Top-down shooter
- Mode: Single-player

Hotline Miami 2: Wrong Number is a 2015 top-down shooter video game developed by Dennaton Games and published by Devolver Digital. The game takes place before, during, and after the events of Hotline Miami (2012), focusing on the background and aftermath of the massacres committed against the Russian mafia in Miami by Jacket, the protagonist of the previous game. The player takes on the role of several characters, witnessing the events from different perspectives across the United States. In each level, the player is tasked with defeating every enemy through any means possible. In the version of the game released on Steam, the player has access to a level editor, allowing them to create and share custom levels with other players.

Hotline Miami 2: Wrong Number was conceived as downloadable content for its predecessor, but became a standalone sequel after its length surpassed it. The game was announced in December 2012 via designer Jonatan Söderström's Twitter. Developed as the final installment in the series, Dennaton incorporated all unused concepts from the first game's development. The game's console versions were developed by Abstraction Games. Announced at E3 2013, Hotline Miami 2: Wrong Number was delayed several times. It was released worldwide on 10 March 2015 for Linux, OS X, PlayStation 3, PlayStation 4, PlayStation Vita, and Windows.

Hotline Miami 2: Wrong Number received generally positive reviews from critics, who praised the soundtrack, but had diverse opinions on the gameplay, level design and ending. A scene depicting sexual assault triggered a mostly negative response from media outlets and caused the game to be refused classification in Australia. A localised version was released in Japan on 25 June 2015 as part of Hotline Miami: Collected Edition. The game was ported to Nintendo Switch alongside the first game in the Hotline Miami Collection in 2019, which was later ported to the Xbox One and Stadia in 2020 and the PlayStation 5 and Xbox Series X/S in 2023.

== Gameplay ==
A gameplay screenshot showing the player as Corey engaging in combat with the Russian mafia, with the current score visible in the top right

Hotline Miami 2: Wrong Number is a top-down shooter video game that is divided into numerous segments presented as "acts" and "scenes". In each chapter, the player is tasked with defeating every enemy with melee and ranged attacks. Additional methods available to the player include knocking out enemies with a door and finishing moves. Each stage has a varied design, composed of large, open rooms with many ways for enemies to approach the player. Most chapters have the player take control of a different character. Each character behaves differently, possessing unique abilities like dodging or defeating opponents non-lethally. Some characters can choose from a selection of weapons or masks, the latter of which modifies their abilities depending on the mask chosen.

Both the player and enemies can be felled by a single attack. To compensate, the player can quickly restart the current stage after death, allowing the player to rethink their strategy. As the game progresses, different types of enemies will appear, including guard dogs immune to unarmed attacks and thugs that are immune to everything except bullets. Additionally, the enemy behavior is inconsistent, with reactions to the player's actions ranging from immediate reaction to ignorance. An example of this is an enemy not reacting to a death occurring in front of them. Upon completion of the game, "Hard Mode" is unlocked for levels in which the player achieved a rank of C+ or higher. In Hard Mode, enemies are more difficult to take down and abilities such as locking on to enemies are removed.

The Steam version of Hotline Miami 2 includes a level editor, allowing players to create their own levels. Additional tools allow for the creation of cutscenes and dialogue, making it possible to make custom campaigns. These creations can be shared on the Steam Workshop service, where other players can download and play them.

== Synopsis ==
=== Characters and setting ===
The events of Hotline Miami 2: Wrong Number are presented out of chronological order: before, during, and after the events of Hotline Miami (2012), focusing on events in 1985, 1989, and 1991 respectively. After the events of the original game, the player character, Jacket, (Note: Jacket is a fan-assigned name to an otherwise unnamed character. The name was adopted by Dennaton themselves afterwards.) is arrested, having been manipulated by 50 Blessings—a neo-nationalist terror cell posing as a peaceful activist group—into assassinating the Russian mafia's leadership, which leads to his nationwide infamy.

The game follows several playable characters through a series of intersecting plotlines that explore the background and aftermath of Jacket's rampage. Beard, the shopkeeper from Jacket's hallucinations in the first game, serves alongside him in a commando squad deployed in Hawaii in 1985. Operating simultaneously with Jacket in 1989 are Jake, a nativist member of 50 Blessings, and Richter, a reluctant operative of the same group, both committing their own massacres. In 1991, a group of copycat killers known as The Fans try to emulate Jacket for attention. Meanwhile, the Son of the Russian Mafia boss from the first game aims to restore the Russians' power against the Colombian Cartel, assisted by The Henchman, who seeks retirement. Martin Brown, a sadistic actor, uses his role in the in-universe film Midnight Animal to fulfill his violent fantasies, while detective Manny Pardo employs extreme violence to deal with criminals. Evan Wright, a writer, seeks to document the massacres in a book.

Richard, a mysterious figure in a rooster mask that appeared to Jacket in the original game, appears at different points to most of the game's playable characters. He is a representation of their fears, taunting and criticising them for their actions.

=== Plot ===
In 1985, the United States and the Soviet Union are at war and Soviet forces have invaded and occupied Hawaii. To repel the invasion, Beard and his squad conduct a series of special operations against the Soviets. Their psychologically troubled Colonel begins losing his grip on reality, volunteering them for increasingly desperate and dangerous missions while ruminating on their impending deaths and the loss of the war. For their last assignment, they besiege a heavily guarded Soviet-occupied power plant. The Soviet Colonel–having apparently gone insane–murders the plant's technicians and causes a reactor meltdown before committing suicide. As the unit escapes, a booby trap explodes and severely injures two of its members, including Jacket, but Beard manages to save his life. After the event, the two are sent home as the war continues. One year later, the Soviets fire a nuclear missile at San Francisco, winning the war and killing Beard.

In 1989, Jake and Richter are sent on missions parallel to Jacket's. Jake realises the officially peaceful 50 Blessings organisation has been the one ordering him to commit massacres when he meets with one of their representatives, who denies this. Jake is sent on a suicide mission but is captured and killed by the Russian Mafia. Richter is reluctant to work with 50 Blessings until they threaten his ailing mother. He is captured and imprisoned, but escapes during a prison riot orchestrated by the organisation to kill him, as they wanted to prevent him from corroborating Jacket's testimony.

In 1991, Jacket undergoes trial for the mass murders he perpetrated. The trials are widely publicised, and journalist Evan Wright wants to learn more about the events to write a book, placing strain on his finances and marriage. Evan is given leads by his friend Manny Pardo, a police detective who uses his position to conduct killing sprees during stakeout operations, justifying them as self-defence. Richter shares his story with Evan in exchange for plane tickets for his mother to come to Hawaii. The trials also result in a film depicting Jacket as "The Pig Butcher". The film's star, Martin Brown, dies when he is accidentally shot by an actress with live ammunition on the set of the film's final scene. Inspired by Jacket's killings, the Fans carry out a string of murders against petty crooks and drug dealers, unaware of the larger context of Jacket's campaign of violence. They kill a former henchman of the Russian mafia; when his boss (the Son) attempts to reconnect with him, the Fans track down the call's origins and assault the mafia's headquarters. The Fans are all killed in the attack by the Son except for Tony, who Pardo kills afterwards. Pardo has a nightmare where he is outed as the "Miami Mutilator", a serial killer he has seemingly been investigating, and barricades himself in his home.

The Son tries to reclaim his father's empire from Colombian gangsters who filled the power vacuum left by his father's death. After the Colombians are defeated, he invites his old henchman to visit their new hideout, inadvertently giving away his location to the Fans and triggering the attack depicted earlier. Under the influence of his designer drugs, the Son goes on a rampage, killing his men and the otherworldly monsters he interprets the Fans as before walking off the roof on a rainbow bridge to his death. After the attacks, Richter and his mother in Hawaii hear news of the assassination of the American and Soviet presidents in an attempted coup d'état. The Soviets declare war on the United States, launching nuclear attacks that obliterate Miami and Hawaii. In their final moments, Pardo points a gun at his barricaded door while drunk, Evan either works on his book or eats with his family depending on the player's actions, the actress from Midnight Animal drinks in her bedroom, and Jacket sits alone in a prison cell. Starting a new game adds a new introductory cutscene wherein Richard berates the playable characters for starting a story that ends in their deaths.

== Development ==
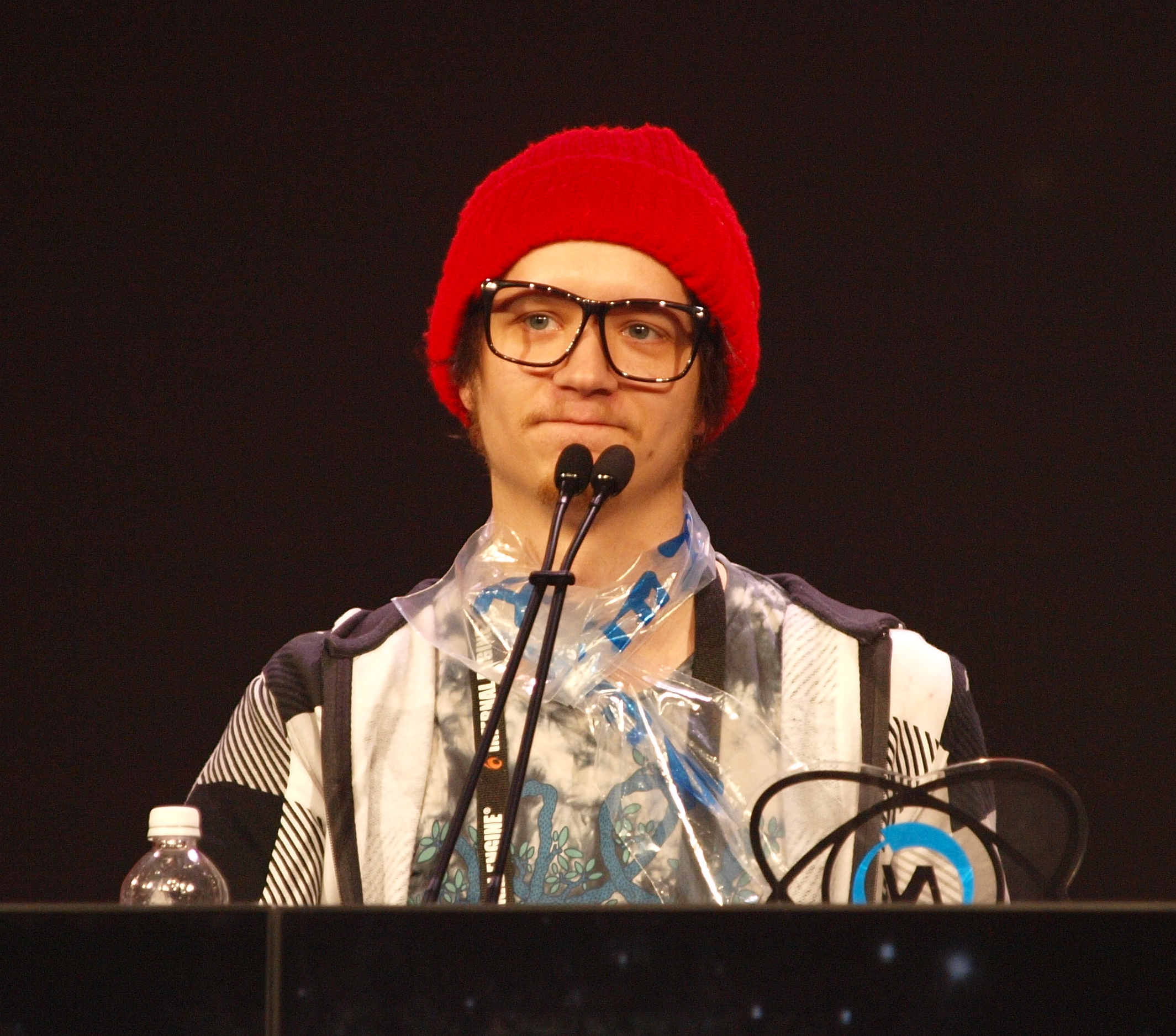
Designer and programmer Jonatan Söderström at the Game Developers Conference in 2010

Hotline Miami 2: Wrong Number was developed by Dennaton Games, a duo composed of designer and programmer Jonatan Söderström and artist Dennis Wedin. Following the success of Hotline Miami, Dennaton soon began developing downloadable content to expand on the game, planning for it to both rival the base game in scale and introduce new playable characters alongside a level editor. As development progressed, Dennaton realized the scope was greater than that of Hotline Miami and decided to transform it into a full sequel. Söderström announced the sequel on 26 November 2012, via his Twitter account. As with the first game, Hotline Miami 2 was made in Game Maker 7. When porting the game to consoles, Abstraction Games used their own SilverWare engine as well as the conversion program GameBaker.

The game was designed to be the last in the series, with Dennaton focusing on including ideas they were unable to use in the first game and developing a more fleshed-out universe. In a 2022 interview, Wedin stated that they originally planned on creating two more games in the series, including an interquel, but chose to combine them and complete the story in one game. Dennaton prioritised developing the game specifically for the fans of the original, comparing their development strategy to that of the Mega Man series and being unconcerned with trying to attract a larger audience; the game's "Hard Mode" originated from complaints about the original game's difficulty. A primary focus was to expand the universe of Hotline Miami, designing new characters that were each given a unique personality. Söderström described this as a necessity, or else they would have turned out to be "bland".

=== Music ===
"Roller Mobster"
An excerpt from Carpenter Brut's "Roller Mobster", used in the game's "Death Wish" chapter

The success of Hotline Miami contributed to a rise in popularity of the artists behind the game's soundtrack. Seeking similar success, numerous artists submitted tracks to Dennaton to get their music featured in the sequel. By the time the soundtrack of Hotline Miami 2 was finalised, roughly 200 songs were sent to Dennaton, with only a few being accepted alongside tracks found by Dennaton themselves, resulting in a final soundtrack of around fifty total pieces. Music from artists such as M.O.O.N. and Jasper Byrne, who had tracks in the first game, were included alongside music from newcomers such as Carpenter Brut and Castanets, whose song "You Are the Blood" was used in the game's ending cutscene.

== Marketing and release ==
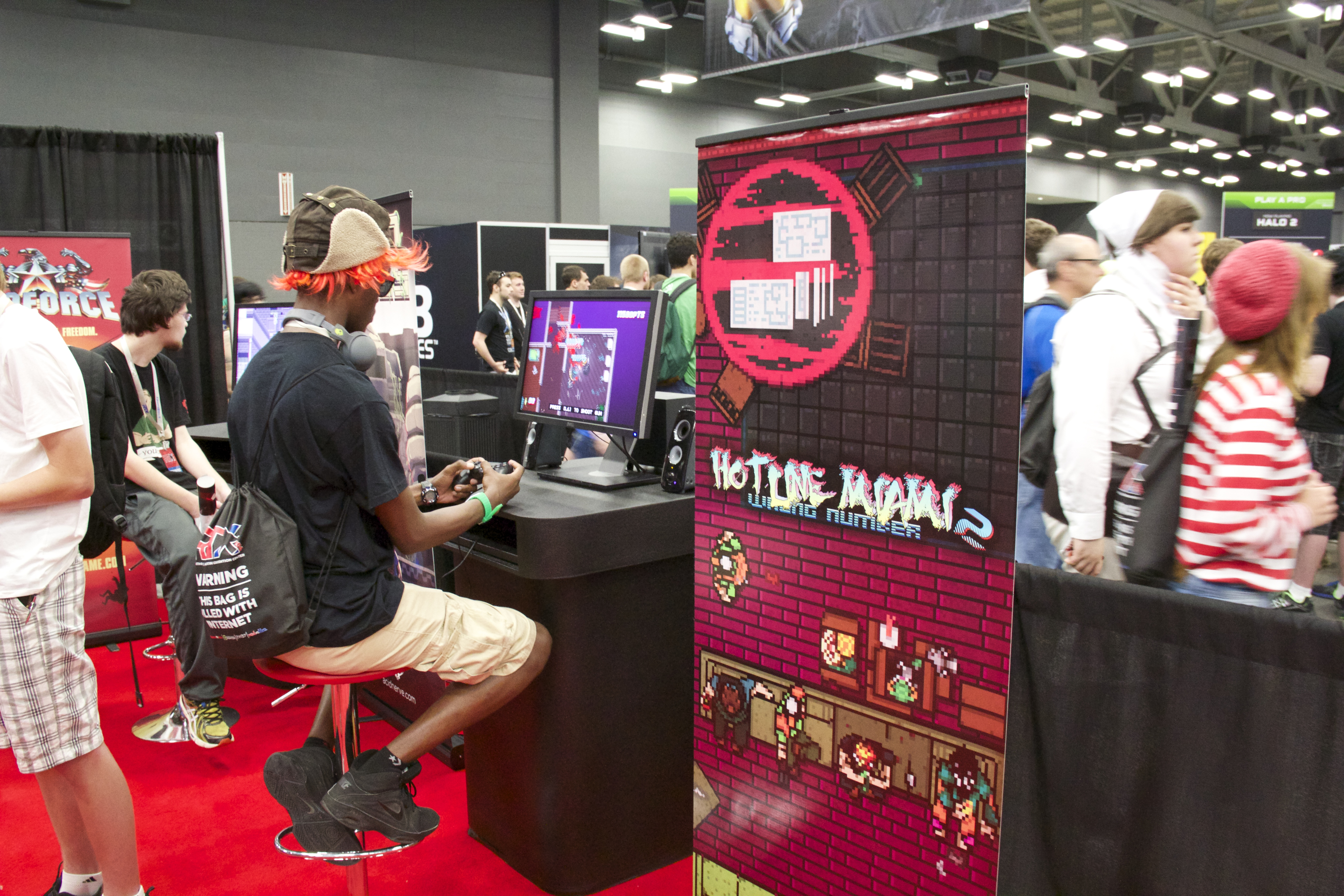
A demo of Hotline Miami 2 being played at RTX 2014

The game was formally announced at E3 2013 under the title Hotline Miami 2: Wrong Number with a release date scheduled for later that year. It was disclosed that the game would be the last in the series, and a trailer across the street from the Los Angeles Convention Center hosted a gameplay showcase after the announcement. Following numerous delays, the game's release date was pushed to Q3 2014. A trailer at E3 2014 demonstrated the game's level editor. In August 2014, roughly 80 minutes of footage from an early version of the game leaked and was uploaded to YouTube, and in October it was announced that the game might be delayed once again to an unspecified time.

In January 2015, a promotional track titled "The Way Home" was unveiled from Magic Sword. A month later, the game was given a release date slated for March. Swedish artist Niklas Åkerblad created the cover art for the game featuring Beard, a character that was noted to be directly inspired by the artist. As a promotion, Jacket was added to the video game Payday 2 (2013) as a playable character, included as a bonus for purchasing the digital special edition of Hotline Miami 2: Wrong Number on Steam. Additionally, a mask pack was included in Payday 2 for both the standard and digital special editions of Hotline Miami 2. A collector's edition of Hotline Miami 2: Wrong Number was also announced, which included a digital download code for the game and the game's soundtrack on vinyl.

Hotline Miami 2: Wrong Number was released on 10 March 2015 for Windows, Mac, Linux, PlayStation 3, PlayStation 4, and PlayStation Vita. A Japan-localized compilation of both Hotline Miami games, titled Hotline Miami: Collected Edition, was released in June. After previously being in alpha, the level editor was released on 22 June 2016 exclusively on computer platforms. On the first day of the level editor's release, around 700 levels and 100 campaigns were published on the Steam Workshop. On 19 August 2019, another compilation of both games, the Hotline Miami Collection, released for Nintendo Switch. The Hotline Miami Collection was later ported to Xbox One and Stadia on 7 April and 22 September 2020 respectively, and PlayStation 5 and Xbox Series X/S on 23 October 2023.

== Reception ==
Reception

Aggregate score
Aggregator	Score
Metacritic	(PS4) 75/100 (PC) 74/100 (Vita) 66/100

Review scores
Publication	Score
Destructoid	7/10
GameSpot	9/10
Hardcore Gamer	4.5/5
IGN	8.8/10
PC Gamer (UK)	57/100
Polygon	8.5/10
VideoGamer.com	7/10

Hotline Miami 2: Wrong Number received generally positive reviews from critics. On Metacritic, it holds an aggregated score of 74 per cent based on 67 reviews for the PC version, 75 per cent based on 18 reviews for the PlayStation 4 version, and 66 per cent based on 4 reviews for the PlayStation Vita version.

The gameplay received a mixed response from critics, who felt the narrative ambition generally led to larger and more challenging levels. Alex Carlson of Hardcore Gamer found this made the level design feel more realistic and diverse. Steven Burns of VideoGamer felt that the game's ambition fell to the "bigger is better" trope, criticising it for not granting the player as much freedom and for making gameplay reliant on the character being used. However, these different characters were viewed positively by Chloi Rad of IGN, who liked the unique ideas of each character, and considered a pacifist character as a "shocking twist" for the series. They described the unique aspects of the characters and the greater gameplay restraints as a trade-off between "arcade-like aspects" and a more expanded story. Maddy Myers of Paste was more negative, stating that the game's difficulty and level design made her feel "disgusted and angry" and describing the game as a "pathetic cash-in on an idea that only worked once and couldn't possibly work again". She furthermore referred to it as a "glorified DLC pack of new levels" specifically made for people who "like rape and torture." The gameplay differences were more controversial among fans; in a 2022 interview with Noclip, Söderström and Wedin stated that they were harassed following the game's release due to its design differences, leading to them becoming less involved in online communities.

The game's narrative was noted for being far more elaborate than in the first game, and was divisive. Burns of VideoGamer and Rad of IGN lauded the narrative, with Burns praising Dennaton's world design and Rad praising the variety in character motivations. Dave Cook of Vice praised the narrative for being a "smart story that many people simply didn't understand", and praised the ending. On the contrary, Chris Thurster of PC Gamer and Tony Coles of Eurogamer were conflicted on the game's narrative and its ending. Both questioned whether the series needed lore, or if the events leading up to the first game needed to be explained. The game's story was found difficult to follow by Myers of Paste and Alec Meer of Rock Paper Shotgun, with the former criticising the constant swapping between characters and the latter describing the story as a "disordered jumble of post-it note scribbles".

The game's soundtrack was acclaimed by critics, being considered just as good as the first game's and considered one of the best aspects of the game. Chris Carter of Destructoid considered it one of his favourite video game soundtracks. The soundtrack was praised for its combination with gameplay by Thurster of PC Gamer and Burns of VideoGamer. Some tracks received praise for their use in the game, with "Roller Mobster" highlighted by Thurster of PC Gamer, and "You Are the Blood" being lauded by Caty McCarthy of VG247 in 2018, describing the song's use in the ending sequence as harrowing.

=== Sexual assault scene ===
A screenshot of the scene where the Pig Butcher assaults a woman sexually in the game's controversial opening

In the game's opening tutorial, the player controls the Pig Butcher who, after clearing out all other enemies, is guided towards a girl and instructed to "finish her". Control of the Pig Butcher is then taken away from the player and a cutscene plays where he attempts to sexually assault her whilst she struggles to escape. The scene is interrupted by the director of the in-universe film Midnight Animal, revealing the events to be a film shoot. This scene was demonstrated for the first time during the gameplay demo shown at a Rezzed exposition. Many attendees shared Nathan Grayson's view of it being a "deeply troubling moment in an otherwise excellent demo". Cara Ellison of PC Gamer wrote that the scene made her feel "betrayed by something she loved", uncomfortable with being placed into the role of the Pig Butcher and having to identify with him. She also criticised the low amount of agency given to the victim. The scene was removed from the demo and its inclusion in the final game was reconsidered. Wedin affirmed that the team chose to cut the scene short because "[sexual violence] was not what the Hotline Miami series is about".

The scene caused the game to be refused classification in Australia, prohibiting its sale in the country. In January 2015, the Australian Classification Board wrote that the scene features red light over a black background to emphasise the sexual violence, while the victim's legs are "viewed kicking as she struggles beneath him". Devolver Digital mentioned a cut and uncut option for the scene had been added. Dennaton said they were "concerned and disappointed" by the actions of the Australian Classification Board, feeling they "stretched the facts" in their judgment of the game, but confirmed they would not challenge the ruling. They later suggested that fans in Australia should pirate the game. In August 2019, Devolver applied for a rating for the Hotline Miami Collection via the International Age Rating Coalition to publish the collection on Switch. After being given a rating of MA15+, the game was briefly available in Australia via the Nintendo eShop, but removed within a few hours. It was also temporarily available for purchase on PlayStation 5 in the country upon its release on that platform, but was removed from people's consoles in October 2024.

Upon release, the scene's inclusion was widely criticised. Burns of VideoGamer described the scene as "merely existing for throwaway shock value", calling it a "grave mistake" that did not feature in the narrative. Thurster of PC Gamer questioned the inclusion of the scene for the same reasons as Burns, further describing it as "artless and alienating" and believing the option to skip it demonstrated a "lack of confidence in the entire idea". Myers of Paste was indifferent, criticising the scene for giving "no narrative pay-off" and further mocking it for being in an in-universe movie. In contrast to other critics, Astrid Budgor of Kill Screen positively viewed the scene, describing it as "[existing] to set up a schism between reality and fiction as one of the game's major themes" and "the psychosis of [the Pig Butcher]," though viewed the option to skip it as devaluing the concept.
