= Embrace Kids =

Embrace Kids may refer to:

- Embrace Kids (film), documentary film from Body Image Movement
- Embrace Kids Foundation, organisation supported by Rutgers University dance marathon
