= Akerblad =

Akerblad is a surname. Notable people with the surname include:

- Johan David Åkerblad (1763–1819), Swedish diplomat and orientalist
- Niklas Åkerblad (born 1983), Swedish artist and musician
