= List of 2016 box office number-one films in Australia =

This is a list of films which have placed number one at the box office in Australia during 2016. All amounts are in Australian dollars.

== Number-one films ==
†	This implies the highest-grossing movie of the year.

#	Week ending	Film	Total week gross	Openings
1	6 January 2016	Star Wars: The Force Awakens	$14,033,584	Point Break (#5), Snoopy and Charlie Brown: The Peanuts Movie (#7), Sherlock: "The Abominable Bride" (#9), Mr. Six (#14)
2	13 January 2016	Star Wars: The Force Awakens	$7,138,111	The Revenant (#2), Sisters (#3), Wazir (#17), The Himalayas (#20)
3	20 January 2016	The Revenant	$4,947,295	Goosebumps (#2), The 5th Wave (#4), The Big Short (#7), Carol (#11), Detective Chinatown (#18)
4	27 January 2016	The Hateful Eight	$3,498,584	The Danish Girl (#10), Ip Man 3 (#13), Airlift (#15), Lazer Team (#18)
5	3 February 2016	Dirty Grandpa	$3,031,867	Spotlight (#5), Room (#15), Branagh Theatre Live: The Winter's Tale (#18), Looking for Grace (#20)
6	10 February 2016	Dirty Grandpa	$1,951,829	The Choice (#7), Steve Jobs (#13), From Vegas to Macau III (#17), The Monkey King 2 (#18), The Importance of Being Earnest (#19)
7	17 February 2016	Deadpool	$19,193,411	Zoolander 2 (#2), Brooklyn (#3)
8	24 February 2016	Deadpool	$9,971,537	How to Be Single (#2), Ride Along 2 (#3), The Mermaid (#6), Three Wise Cousins (#8), Concussion (#10), 45 Years (#13), Risen (#15), Trumbo (#16), Neerja (#17)
9	2 March 2016	Deadpool	$5,505,107	Hail, Caesar! (#3), Gods of Egypt (#4), 13 Hours: The Secret Soldiers of Benghazi (#6), Pride and Prejudice and Zombies (#13), A Violent Prosecutor (#18)
10	9 March 2016	The Lady in the Van	$3,345,513	Triple 9 (#6), The Finest Hours (#12), Met Opera: Les pêcheurs de perles (#19), The Boy and the Beast (#20)
11	16 March 2016	The Lady in the Van	$2,523,713	Grimsby (#3), 10 Cloverfield Lane (#3), Love Punjab (#6), Ardaas (#12)
12	23 March 2016	Zootopia	$4,947,389	London Has Fallen (#2), Miracles from Heaven (#13), Kapoor & Sons (#14), The Witch (#15)
13	30 March 2016	Batman v Superman: Dawn of Justice	$18,132,666	My Big Fat Greek Wedding 2 (#2), Kung Fu Panda 3 (#4), Eye in the Sky (#9), Ambarsariya (#12), A Bigger Splash (#14)
14	6 April 2016	Batman v Superman: Dawn of Justice	$6,164,183	Sherpa (#12), Chongqing Hot Pot (#16), Ki & Ka (#17), Met Opera: Turandot (#19)
15	13 April 2016	Zootopia	$4,583,537	The Huntsman: Winter's War (#3), Rams (#12), Where to Invade Next (#20)
16	20 April 2016	The Jungle Book	$9,274,573	The Boss (#3), The Divergent Series: Allegiant (#4), Fan (#9), Theri (#11), Wide Open Sky (#19)
17	27 April 2016	The Jungle Book	$8,261,268	Eddie the Eagle (#2), Midnight Special (#11), Marguerite (#14), Pawno (#20)
18	4 May 2016	Captain America: Civil War	$17,372,748	Mother's Day (#4), Finding Mr. Right 2 (#8), A Month of Sundays (#10), God's Not Dead 2 (#14), Baaghi: Rebels in Love (#16)
19	11 May 2016	Captain America: Civil War	$7,546,199	Bad Neighbours 2 (#2), Florence Foster Jenkins (#5), The Man Who Knew Infinity (#7), 24 (#9), Shakespeare Live! From the RSC (#10), Mia Madre (#17), Only Yesterday (#20)
20	18 May 2016	Captain America: Civil War	$4,667,109	The Angry Birds Movie (#2), Whiskey Tango Foxtrot (#5), Bastille Day (#9), The Boy (#11), The First Monday in May (#12), National Theatre Live: Hangmen (#16), Azhar (#17)
21	25 May 2016	X-Men: Apocalypse	$7,979,015	The Meddler (#12), Kaptaan (#7), Kiss Rocks Vegas (#19)
22	1 June 2016	X-Men: Apocalypse	$3,650,862	Alice Through the Looking Glass (#2), The Nice Guys (#3), Hunt for the Wilderpeople (#4), Painting the Modern Garden: Monet to Matisse (#18). Saadey CM Saab (#20)
23	8 June 2016	Now You See Me 2	$3,705,172	Money Monster (#2), Housefull 3 (#9), Queen of the Desert (#13), God Willing (#14), Met Opera: Madama Butterfly (#16)
24	15 June 2016	The Conjuring 2	$5,010,584	Teenage Mutant Ninja Turtles: Out of the Shadows (#2), The Wailing (#13)
25	22 June 2016	Finding Dory †	$13,178,708	Warcraft (#2), Me Before You (#3), Udta Punjab (#12), St. Peter's and the Papal Basilicas of Rome (#16), Gentleman (#18)
26	29 June 2016	Finding Dory †	$11,789,874	Independence Day: Resurgence (#2), Sardaar Ji 2 (#11), Mustang (#12), Everybody Wants Some!! (#17), Three (#18)
27	6 July 2016	Finding Dory †	$10,328,936	Central Intelligence (#2), The BFG (#3), Ice Age: Collision Course (#4), Sultan (#13), The Wait (#16), Met Opera: Roberto Devereux (#19)
28	13 July 2016	Finding Dory †	$7,368,649	The Legend of Tarzan (#2), Mike and Dave Need Wedding Dates (#6), Cold War 2 (#12), Goldstone (#13), Maggie's Plan (#17)
29	20 July 2016	Ghostbusters	$5,977,276	Our Kind of Traitor (#11), Sing Street (#13), So Young 2: Never Gone (#20)
30	27 July 2016	Star Trek Beyond	$5,102,368	Lights Out (#4), Love & Friendship (#9), Batman: The Killing Joke (#12)
31	3 August 2016	Jason Bourne	$9,953,610	André Rieu's 2016 Maastricht Concert (#4), Bambukat (#12), Dishoom (#17), Embrace of the Serpent (#18), League of Gods (#19)
32	10 August 2016	Suicide Squad	$17,208,761	Absolutely Fabulous: The Movie (#3), Embrace (#18), Met Opera: Elektra (#19)
33	17 August 2016	Suicide Squad	$7,345,069	Bad Moms (#2), Sausage Party (#3), Rustom (#8), Train to Busan (#9), Line Walker (#11), Mohenjo Daro (#16), Truman (#17)
34	24 August 2016	Suicide Squad	$3,938,758	The Shallows (#4), War Dogs (#5), Kubo and the Two Strings (#8), Time Raiders (#13), High-Rise (#19)
35	31 August 2016	Bad Moms	$2,677,482	Ben-Hur (#4), David Brent: Life on the Road (#10), Kingsglaive: Final Fantasy XV (#11), Free State of Jones (#12), The Tunnel (#16)
36	7 September 2016	The Secret Life of Pets	$1,932,364	Don't Breathe (#2), Nerve (#5), Blood Father (#11), Sunset Song (#17)
37	14 September 2016	The Secret Life of Pets	$5,777,431	Sully (#2), Louis Theroux: My Scientology Movie (#10), One More Time with Feeling (#11), Captain Fantastic (#14), Baar Baar Dekho (#17), Iru Mugan (#19)
38	21 September 2016	The Secret Life of Pets	$6,111,105	Bridget Jones's Baby (#2), Pete's Dragon (#4), The Beatles: Eight Days a Week (#5), Blair Witch (#6), Spin Out (#11), The Fourth Phase (#16), S Storm (#17), Pink (#19)
39	28 September 2016	The Secret Life of Pets	$6,624,582	Storks (#3), Snowden (#7), A Chinese Odyssey Part Three (#18)
40	5 October 2016	Miss Peregrine's Home for Peculiar Children	$5,906,747	The Magnificent Seven (#3), M.S. Dhoni: The Untold Story (#10), Nikka Zaildar (#12), I Belonged to You (#15), L.O.R.D: Legend of Ravaging Dynasties (#19)
41	12 October 2016	The Girl on the Train	$5,330,214	Deepwater Horizon (#3), Operation Mekong (#10), Hillsong: Let Hope Rise (#11), Remo (#14), National Theatre Live: The Deep Blue Sea (#18), Batman: Return of the Caped Crusaders (#19)
42	19 October 2016	The Girl on the Train	$3,522,930	Inferno (#2), Masterminds (#6), Where Am I Going? (#11), Miss Saigon: 25th Anniversary (#13), Shin Godzilla (#15), Julieta (#17)
43	26 October 2016	Jack Reacher: Never Go Back	$3,328,031	Keeping Up with the Joneses (#3), Ouija: Origin of Evil (#5), Café Society (#10)
44	2 November 2016	Doctor Strange	$8,573,397	Ae Dil Hai Mushkil (#7), Hell or High Water (#8), Shivaay (#15), Robinson Crusoe (#16), Luck Key (#17)
45	9 November 2016	Doctor Strange	$4,859,104	Hacksaw Ridge (#2), The Accountant (#3), The Light Between Oceans (#5), Mr. Donkey (#19), Met Opera: Tristan & Isolde (#20)
46	16 November 2016	Doctor Strange	$3,389,479	Arrival (#2), Nocturnal Animals (#5), Chaar Sahibzaade: Rise of Banda Singh Bahadur (#10), Doctor Who: The Power of the Daleks (#14), Death Note: Light Up the New World (#18), Achcham Yenbadhu Madamaiyada (#19)
47	23 November 2016	Fantastic Beasts and Where to Find Them	$12,638,687	Force 2 (#12), War on Everyone (#18), I, Daniel Blake (#19)
48	30 November 2016	Fantastic Beasts and Where to Find Them	$7,284,420	The Founder (#2), André Rieu: Christmas with André (#4), Bad Santa 2 (#7), Your Name (#9), Dear Zindagi (#11), Billy Lynn's Long Halftime Walk (#15), The Fencer (#16), Australian Made: 30th Anniversary (#17), Sky on Fire (#20)
49	7 December 2016	Fantastic Beasts and Where to Find Them	$4,531,946	Trolls (#2), Underworld: Blood Wars (#3), Queen of Katwe (#12), Up for Love (#19), Kahaani 2 (#20)
50	14 December 2016	Trolls	$3,637,334	Office Christmas Party (#3), Befikre (#12), My Annoying Brother (#18), Sword Master (#20)
51	21 December 2016	Rogue One: A Star Wars Story	$20,369,584	The Wasted Times (#14)
52	28 December 2016	Rogue One: A Star Wars Story	$11,298,586	Moana (#2), Sing (#3), Why Him? (#4), Allied (#5), La La Land (#6), Dangal (#8), Red Dog: True Blue (#9), A United Kingdom (#12), Doctor Who: "The Return of Doctor Mysterio" (#14), Rosalie Blum (#16), Paterson (#19)

== Highest-grossing films ==
Highest-grossing films of 2016
Rank	Title	Distributor	Domestic gross
1	Finding Dory	Disney	$36,162,796
2	Deadpool	Fox	$33,314,499
3	Rogue One	Disney	$28,329,610
4	Star Wars: The Force Awakens	Disney	$26,940,069
5	Suicide Squad	Warner Bros.	$26,126,519
6	Captain America: Civil War	Disney	$25,200,229
7	Batman v Superman: Dawn of Justice	Warner Bros.	$22,517,365
8	Fantastic Beasts and Where to Find Them	Warner Bros.	$22,474,347
9	The Secret Life of Pets	Universal	$22,474,347
10	Zootopia	Disney	$21,365,901

== See also ==
- List of Australian films - Australian films by year
- 2016 in film
