= Ultros =

- Developer: Hadoque
- Publisher: Kepler Interactive
- Director: Niklas Åkerblad
- Designers: Mårten Brüggemann; Hugo Persson-Bille
- Programmers: Mårten Brüggemann; Hugo Persson-Bille
- Artist: Niklas Åkerblad
- Writer: Pelle Cahndlerby
- Composer: Ratvader
- Engine: Unity
- Platforms: macOS; PlayStation 4; PlayStation 5; Windows; Nintendo Switch; Xbox Series X/S
- Release: macOS, PS4, PS5, Windows; February 13, 2024; Switch, Xbox Series X/S; February 13, 2025
- Genre: Metroidvania
- Mode: Single-player

Ultros is a 2024 Metroidvania video game developed by Hadoque and published by Kepler Interactive. Players control a space traveler who wakes on an alien spaceship that imprisons a demon. It is available for macOS, Windows, PlayStation 4, PlayStation 5, Nintendo Switch, and Xbox Series X/S.

Ultros received generally positive reviews from critics.

== Gameplay ==
Players control a space traveler who wakes on a spaceship called the Sarcophagus, which imprisons a demon named Ultros. Players must prevent Ultros from waking. The ship has become overgrown with plant life, and various aliens live onboard. Interacting with these aliens can give players seeds, which can grow into edible plants. Because of an endless time loop, some of the aliens have been driven mad and are now bosses that must be defeated in combat. Players have different kinds of attacks. Eating plants and defeated bosses allows players to increase their skills. Making precision attacks with advanced skills to defeat bosses gives players more powerful power-ups. The time loop allows players to return to the start of the game. Although some aspects are kept, players' skills are reset after each loop; however, their skills are now easier to increase. The world changes, too, based on players' choices in previous time loops, which can open previously inaccessible areas. This is often done via jumping on platforms, as in Metroidvania games. Dying causes players to return to their last save point.

== Development ==
The artist, Niklas Åkerblad, said he wanted to create a coherent world. As a child, he believed Sonic the Hedgehog was more coherent than the competing Super Mario series, which he said felt like "an amalgam of very different ideas". The design of the Sarcophagus was influenced by H. P. Lovecraft's depiction of Cthulhu, who retains an influence on our reality despite being trapped elsewhere. Åkerblad wanted to evoke the ecologically-themed terror and wonder of Nausicaä of the Valley of the Wind and the difficulty of communicating with a non-human intelligence of Close Encounters of the Third Kind. The time loop mechanic was designed to mimic karma, so that actions in one life carried forward to the next. The developers also wanted players to be able to experience decisions from different perspectives. The studio is based in Sweden, but composer Oscar Rydelius traveled to Peru to record indigenous instruments and ambient sounds in the Amazon rainforest. He then pitch-shifted the sounds and experimented to find ways to balance making them sound both familiar and otherworldly. Ultros was released for macOS, PlayStation 4, PlayStation 5, and Windows on February 13, 2024, and for Nintendo Switch and Xbox Series X/S one year later on February 13, 2025.

== Reception ==
Reception

Aggregate scores
Aggregator	Score
Metacritic	(PS5) 79/100 (PC) 81/100
OpenCritic	77% recommend

Review scores
Publication	Score
Digital Trends	3/5
Eurogamer	4/5
GameSpot	8/10
GamesRadar+	4.5/5
PC Gamer (US)	82/100
Push Square	7/10
Shacknews	9/10

Ultros received positive reviews on Metacritic. Fellow review aggregator OpenCritic assessed that the game received strong approval, being recommended by 77% of critics.

Although Rock Paper Shotgun called it "vibrant and always interesting", they said the execution falls short of its promise. GameSpot said its complexity can occasionally be frustrating but it is an "engrossing adventure set within a visually memorable world". Comparing it to the work of Ovid, Eurogamer praised how Ultros changed the focus of a Metroidvania game from exploration to transforming the world while also having excellent combat, artwork, and music. GamesRadar+ called it "unique and fresh". They enjoyed the exploration and said they never felt bored when returning to spots they had already been to. TechRadar called it "delightful to play" and praised the art, story, and controls. Although they said it is "a fantastic Metroidvania", they found some of the fights to be a bit too easy.

Push Square said Ultros has stunning and memorable art, but they felt the combat and controls did not live up to these highs.

=== Accolades ===
Year	Ceremony	Category	Result	Ref.
2024	Golden Joystick Awards	Best Indie Game	Nominated	
2025	New York Game Awards	Chumley’s Speakeasy Award for Best Hidden Gem	Nominated	
2025	Game Developers Choice Awards	Best Visual Art	Honorable mention	
2025	Independent Games Festival	Excellence in Visual Arts	Honorable mention	
