= Niklas Åkerblad =

Swedish artist and musician

- Born: 17 April 1983 (age 43); Gothenburg, Sweden
- Education: University of Skövde
- Known for: Painting, video game art, music
- Website: elhuervo.tumblr.com

Niklas Åkerblad (born 17 April 1983), also known by his pseudonym El Huervo, is a Swedish artist and musician known for his oil paintings, watercolor paintings, and video game art. His portraits are known to be bold and vivid in nature. Åkerblad's wide body of work gained significant attention following the success of the video game Hotline Miami, for which he created the cover art, along with its successor Hotline Miami 2: Wrong Number. Åkerblad was also the sole artist for other video games, including Kometen and Else Heart.Break(). Åkerblad is also widely known for regularly creating the cover art for Bandcamp Weekly, the official podcast of Bandcamp. Åkerblad is also a musician with an extensive discography and has created soundtracks for several video games.

== Biography ==
=== Early life ===
Åkerblad grew up in Gothenburg, the largest port city in the Nordic countries. As a child, Åkerblad spent the majority of his time indoors drawing, and being influenced by comic book art and video game covers. He found relative happiness leading a simple life and being free to be creative. He took an early interest in art, often drawing pictures of monsters, comic heroes, and masks. In his youth, Åkerblad would discover the work of Stan Sakai, Moebius, and Edward Hopper, which he studied and took great inspiration from. It would be later while working as a concept artist for a game studio, that he would make the decision to take on independent art in earnest. By this time, he primarily painted in either watercolor with ink outlines or strict oil on canvas. He experimented with contradiction and boldness, often working from vivid color palettes. This style largely remained a consistent theme in his future paintings along with a consistency for blending horror and beauty. Recurring themes in Åkerblad's paintings are love and social oppression. His work often features skulls, masks, and various elements of Danse Macabre. When asked where his inspiration and drive originated, Åkerblad replied, "Everyday life can be so mundane. Art is an adventure. So I want to explore as much as possible before I die. It is just a very strong calling."

=== Breakthrough ===
In 2012, Åkerblad had been spending an increasing amount of time with his friends and fellow Swedish artists Dennis Wedin and Jonatan Söderström, when he learned of Hotline Miami, still in its early stages of development. The pair had formed a partnership called Dennaton Games, and needed a place to finish work on the game. Åkerblad offered his apartment, and the arrangement continued until completion of Hotline Miami. When Wedin and Söderström asked Åkerblad to create the cover art for Hotline Miami, they didn't yet have a specific vision for the art style they wanted. Åkerblad used his own interpretation to create a cover featuring a surreal 80's vibrance and violence in Miami. Åkerblad created several drafts of the cover before completing the final draft, which Dennaton accepted. Åkerblad then spent three days finalizing the cover which would become the iconic portrait of Hotline Miami.

== Video game art ==
In 2008, Åkerblad created concept art which the game Colosseum by Shortfuse Games is based on. Åkerblad worked as a character designer and animator at Shortfuse Games.

In 2010 Svedang and Åkerblad collaborated to design and complete Kometen. Åkerblad created all the art using watercolor, and the game would later be described as a "gorgeous exploration experience". For Kometen's art, Åkerblad set out to create visually stimulating planets for the player to discover. Each planet represented a different message, such as paranoia, unseen danger, and deceit. Åkerblad explained that he wanted his art for the game to communicate what words could not with the player.

In 2012, Åkerblad illustrated the cover art for the top-down action game Hotline Miami, as well as the successor Hotline Miami 2: Wrong Number, citing the Silent Hill franchise as a major influence. The Hotline Miami cover brought Åkerblad to receive critical acclaim and mainstream attention, when Hotline Miami quickly sold more than 1.5 million copies, despite rampant pirating. Åkerblad's cover art became iconic when Hotline Miami gained cult followings, with Åkerblad's cover art being its primary identity. Dennis Wedin and Jonatan Söderström, the creators of Hotline Miami, based some of the game's characters on real people; Åkerblad was immortalized as Beard, who returns as a playable character in Wrong Number. Beard typically stays behind the counter and talks about ongoing events, referring to previous gameplay.

After collaborating with game designer Erik Svedang on several games, Åkerblad took on the art for the 3D adventure game Else Heart.Break() which was published in 2015. Åkerblad's art was recognized again when Else Heart.Break() was nominated for a 2015 IGF Excellence in Visual Art Award. When asked about the unique visual style of Else Heart.Break(), Åkerblad stated "the Swedish television program Skrot-Nisse started to become a major influence. It’s a puppet show, and all the scenography is handmade and very elaborate in its execution, creating an almost over-saturated level of detail."

In 2024, developer studio Hadoque released the video game Ultros, entirely designed in Åkerblad's style, who was the game's art director.

== Music ==
Åkerblad is also a musician. He created tracks for Hotline Miami and Hotline Miami 2: Wrong Number, such as "Crush", "Daisuke", "Turf", "Ghost", and "Rust". Åkerblad was asked to create more music for Hotline Miami, after its creators listened to his track titled "Daisuke" and wanted this particular style and mood of lo-fi heart-pounding music in the game. When asked by Timothy Courtney what was a turning point for Åkerblad's music, Åkerblad replied "Shelby Cinca played guitar on Daisuke, which was the indisputable breakthrough for my music". Åkerblad's music was later recognized when Hotline Miami received the 2012 IGN Best PC Sound Award. Åkerblad's music received further acclaim when the soundtrack for Hotline Miami won The 2012 Best Music of the Year Award from PC Gamer Magazine. In 2014, a 3-disc vinyl album was released containing the tracks for both Hotline Miami games, which featured prominent tracks by Åkerblad, along with tracks by M|O|O|N and Perturbator. Åkerblad also created the album cover art for the double soundtrack release. In 2015, Åkerblad created the vast majority of the sound track for the adventure game Else Heart.Break(). Åkerblad is a member of the rock band Crystal Boys. In 2014, Crystal Boys released their debut album "Let It Slip". Åkerblad has created a discography of more than 100 tracks. Under his El Huervo moniker he also produced music for the Steamworld Dig 2 game.

=== Discography ===
==== Albums ====
- To Stop You Must Die (January 2011, Swedish Columbia)
- World's End (May 2015, Swedish Columbia)
- Vandereer (March 2016, Swedish Columbia)
- A Thing With Feathers (June 2020, Swedish Columbia)
- Sambandh (November 2020, Swedish Columbia)
- Flammarion (October 2021, Swedish Columbia)
- When In Dream (December 2023, El Huervo Casserne)
- The Fire Burns (November 2024, El Huervo Casserne)

==== EPs ====
- Do Not Lay Waste To Homes... (May 2012, Swedish Columbia)
- ...Where You Must Rest Your Weary Bones (June 2012, Swedish Columbia)

==== Singles ====
- Daisuke (June 2014, Swedish Columbia)
- Turf (December 2014, Swedish Columbia)
- Rust b/w Ghost (June 2015, Swedish Columbia)
- Le Temps (December 2017, Swedish Columbia)
- The Setup (November 2018, Swedish Columbia)
- Uncommon (October 2024, El Huervo Casserne)
