= We Dare =

2011 video game

- European cover art for the PlayStation 3 version
- Developer: Ubisoft Milan
- Publisher: Ubisoft
- Platforms: PlayStation 3, Wii
- Release: EU: March 14, 2011; AU: April 14, 2011
- Genre: Party
- Mode: Multiplayer

We Dare is an adult-oriented party video game developed by Ubisoft Milan, and released by Ubisoft in 2011 for the Wii and PlayStation 3 (PS3), exclusively in PAL regions. Gameplay is based with motion controllers to engage in sensually prankish activities such as kissing, striptease and spanking.

We Dare's age rating by PEGI and ACB has drawn criticism by implying that We Dare is suitable for children. We Dare was released in Europe on March 14, 2011, and in Australia on April 14, 2011. We Dare received negative reviews from critics.

== Gameplay ==
We Dare is marketed as a "sexy, quirky, party game" that utilizes both consoles' wand-based motion controllers (the Wii Remote or the PlayStation Move controller) to engage in sensually prankish activities such as kissing, striptease , and spanking. However, reviewers have observed that the game is, in fact, a relatively tame party game compilation with only very mild sexual connotations.

== Release ==
The Pan European Game Information (PEGI) and Australian Classification Board (ACB) have drawn criticism by implying that the game is suitable for children (despite being marketed to adults): As the boards can only classify the game content, not what the players may be doing, PEGI rated the game a 12, while the ACB gave it an even more lenient PG rating. Months later, the PG rating given in Australia was reviewed, but retained. We Dare's YouTube trailer has since been blocked from viewing by Ubisoft, and plans for a North American localization were cancelled. Ubisoft also initially decided against releasing the game in the United Kingdom, citing "[negative] public reaction", but ultimately went back on this decision. We Dare was released in Europe on March 14, 2011, and in Australia on April 14, 2011.

== Reception ==
Eurogamer reviewed the game 3/10, citing it as a "poor quality collection of low-rent mini-games, most of which are badly executed rip-offs of ancient ideas".
