= Australian Classification Review Board =

Australian media classification organisation

Agency overview
- Formed: 1970
- Jurisdiction: Commonwealth of Australia
- Minister responsible: Anika Wells, Minister for Communications
- Agency executive: Sue Knowles, Convenor
- Parent agency: Department of Infrastructure, Transport, Regional Development, Communications, Sport and the Arts (current parent agency), OFLC (original parent agency), Australian Classification Board (brother agency)
- Website: http://www.classification.gov.au

The Australian Classification Review Board is a statutory censorship and classification body overseen by the Australian Government. The corporate body is responsible for reviewing classification decisions made by the Australian Classification Board concerning films, video games and publications for exhibition, sale or hire in Australia. Review decisions need to be initiated by an appeal from a previous applicant, most commonly referred to as "aggrieved party", or a Federal or State Attorney-General.

As of 2026, the board comprises a convenor, deputy convenor and four other board members. The current convenor is Alice Yan, who was appointed in December 2025 to term ending 31 December 2027.

== Organizations ==
The Classification Review Board is a statutory body established by the Classification (Publications, Films and Computer Games) Act 1995 (Cth). This Act also provides a basis for the National Classification Code which guides their decision making. As the State and Territory governments retain responsibility for enforcing censorship and could withdraw from, or ignore the national classification scheme if they so wished, any changes to the national classification scheme must be agreed to by all the State and Territory Censorship Ministers (usually Attorneys-General). South Australia is the only state to maintain a separate Classification Council which can override national classification decisions applicable within the state.

The Classification Review Board does not censor material by ordering cuts or changes. However, they are able to effectively censor media by refusing classification and making the media illegal for hire, exhibit and import to Australia.

== Classification decisions ==
Below is a list of films reviewed by the Classification Review Board after having their initial ratings appealed. Each film includes a summary of its decision, with detailed reports of the reviews from 2001 onwards at the Australian Classification website.

=== 2025 ===
- Two videos showing the assassination of Charlie Kirk and one showing the killing of Iryna Zarutska were classified R 18+ by the Review Board after initially being refused classification.
- Gender Queer – This book kept its Unrestricted rating and consumer advice again.

=== 2024 ===
- Gladiator II – Using a government-approved process to self-classify films, Paramount Pictures' Australian distribution arm initially classified the film M in a pre-censored version. This was taken to the Review Board later by Paramount, and the pre-censored version was determined unanimously to be strong in impact, thus earning the film an MA15+, for its themes and violence. The latter was deemed too impactful for an M rating due to its cumulative nature across the film. The violence was deemed as strong in impact also because the blood and injury detail could not be classified at M.

=== 2023 ===
- The Kerala Story – This film's MA15+ rating was appealed by the Alliance Against Islamophobia. The review board upheld the rating, but changed the consumer advice to note "themes of religious intolerance".
- Gender Queer – The book kept its Unrestricted rating and its consumer advice of "M – Not recommended for readers under 15 years".

=== 2022 ===
- Pieces – The film kept its MA15+ rating due to its suicide and self-harm references among other "strong mental health themes".
- Sissy – This film's R18+ rating was successfully appealed and changed to MA15+; the board found that the violence is "mitigated by exaggerated and stylized production techniques."
- Good Luck to You, Leo Grande – The film's MA15+ rating was successfully appealed to an M for sexuality, nudity, and profanity, as the board found that the impact of the film's sexuality and language was mitigated by contextual justification.
- RimWorld – This computer game was originally refused classification. The review board classified it R18+ because they believed the game disincentivises drug use enough to fit the R18+ rating.

=== 2021 ===
- Ascendant – The film was appealed to drop the MA15+ rating to an unrestricted M and succeeded as a result of the film's fantasy context appropriately justifying the themes and violence.
- Spiral: From the Book of Saw – StudioCanal failed to appeal the film's R18+ rating as a result of the violence having a high impact with no mitigation, despite most of the previous Saw films being rated MA15+; in addition, the consumer advice was upgraded from 'High impact violence' to 'High impact violence, blood and gore'.
- Disco Elysium: The Final Cut – Studio ZA/UM successfully appealed the game's ban and received an R18+ rating on the basis of the in-game drug use having negative effects on the player.
- The Suicide Squad – The review board unanimously determined that the film's classification should be downgraded from R18+ to MA15+. They noted that both the comedic and fantasy context mitigated the impact of the violence.
- The Children in the Pictures – Downgraded from an MA15+ to an unrestricted M rating due to the documentary's purpose of educating audiences about the dangers of child exploitation.
- Ghostbusters: Afterlife – Sony Pictures successfully appealed to lower the film to a PG rating due to the focus on science and humour mitigating the supernatural threat. The original rating, pre-appeal, was M for "fantasy themes and violence," but this was changed to PG for "Fantasy themes and infrequent mild coarse language, some scenes may scare young children."

=== 2020 ===
- Cuties – The Australian Christian Lobby appealed the film's rating in order to ban it for paedophilia concerns. The claim was deemed invalid by the Review Board and the film kept its MA15+ rating.

=== 2019 ===
- Hellboy – Roadshow Entertainment failed to appeal the film's R18+ rating for an MA15+, because the cumulative impact of the violence was not mitigated enough by the fantasy context.
- Rocketman – Successfully appealed from MA15+ to an M rating due to the film's lone use of 'cunt' being used as an act of self-reflection rather than as an aggressive insult directed at another.

=== 2018 ===
- Bumblebee – The film's original version received an M rating for 'Action violence'. A cut version was sent and received the same M rating. Paramount Pictures appealed the cut version's rating and won a PG rating because the themes, violence and language were deemed to be mild in impact.
- We Happy Few – Gearbox Publishing appealed the game's refusal of classification on behalf of Compulsion Games and won, obtaining an R18+. The board found that the use of drugs in the game do not relate to incentives or rewards. The game's Lightbearer DLC was banned in August 2019 via the automated IARC system for drug use relating to incentives and rewards; Gearbox has yet to appeal the DLC's ban.

=== 2017 ===
- The Nut Job 2: Nutty by Nature – Successfully lowered to a G rating due to its slapstick humor and positive message.
- Jigsaw – StudioCanal successfully lowered the film's rating from R18+ to MA15+. The main reason being that the most graphic images were dimly lit and only fleetingly seen.
- Split – Consumers of Mental Health WA failed to appeal the film's M rating for an MA15+ because the content and complex mental illness theme was judged to be only moderate in impact and justified by context.

=== 2016 ===
- Embrace - Dropped from MA15+ to M as the detailed depictions of nudity had an educational context.
- Blair Witch - Failed to lower its MA15+ rating due a strong sense of menace throughout.
- Teenage Mutant Ninja Turtles: Out of the Shadows - Dropped from M to PG as the violence lacked blood, injury or depictions of dead bodies.
- X-Men: Apocalypse - Dropped from MA15+ to M due to the lack of depiction involving serious bodily harm.

=== 2015 ===
- Blinky Bill the Movie - Dropped from PG to G due to the themes being of a very low threat of menace.
- Boychoir - Dropped from M to PG due to the car crash scene lacking injury detail.

=== 2014 ===
- Blended - Dropped from M to PG due to the sexual references being discreetly implied.

=== 2013 ===
- Australian Attorney-General George Brandis tried to appeal the MA15+ rating of 12 video games, believing they should be raised to R18+ due to being given adult ratings in other countries. The appeal failed and all of the games kept their MA15+ ratings.
- American Hustle - Dropped from MA15+ to M as the elements of aggressive coarse language were infrequent.
- Behind the Candelabra - Dropped from MA15+ to M as the film's depiction of drug use dealt with the consequences of addiction and the sex scenes were discreet.
- Children's Island - The Australian Federal Police successfully appealed the film's R18+ rating, banning it due to child pornography concerns.
- Inside Llewyn Davis - Dropped from MA15+ to M as the elements of aggressive coarse language were infrequent.
- Rampage (2009) - Australian Attorney-General George Brandis tried to appeal the film's MA15+ rating but failed as despite the frequent scenes of strong violence, the film never glorified its depiction of violent content.
- Saints Row IV - Appeal of refusal of classification was unsuccessful due to interactive drug use related to incentives and rewards. The game was passed at MA15+ a few years later when it was re-released alongside the Gat Out of Hell expansion.

=== 2012 ===
- Prometheus – Originally classified MA15+ for strong sci-fi violence specifically the birth scene, it was later downgraded to an M classification due to said scene being mitigated by a medical context.

=== 2011 ===
- The Human Centipede 2 (Full Sequence) - Federal Attorney-General Brendan O'Connor successfully appealed the R18+ rating, banning the film for its relentless and continuous sequences of degradation.
- Happy Feet Two - Successfully dropped to a G rating due to its very low sense of threat.
- The House of the Dead: Overkill – Extended Cut – Sega successfully appealed its ban for an MA15+ on the basis that the over-the-top violence mitigated the impact.
- We Dare – Federal Attorney-General Brendan O'Connor failed to appeal the game's rating and thus stuck with its PG rating on the basis that the sexual references were only mild in impact.
- Mortal Kombat – Warner Bros. failed its appeal to attain an MA15+ rating due to violence being of a high degree; this was due to the lack of an R18+ for video games at the time, hence the game was subsequently refused classification for a second time. Has since been re-rated R18+ uncut after said rating's introduction.
- The Twilight Saga: Breaking Dawn - Part 1 – Originally received an MA15+ classification due to the strong themes involving an intense birth scene. It was later downgraded to an M rating due to the fantasy nature of the themes.
- A Serbian Film - An already censored version of the film had its R18+ overturned, banning it for explicit depiction of sexual violence.

=== 2010 ===
- The Karate Kid – Lowered its M rating to a PG due to the consensus being that the violence was not detailed and was relatively infrequent within the narrative.
- Salò, or the 120 Days of Sodom – Federal Attorney-General Brendan O'Conner tried to appeal its R18+ rating. It was originally banned since 1997 but was recently re-rated by the classification board. The film was again awarded an R18+ rating due to the additional three hours of extras which give context to the film, the same reason as the classification board.

=== 2009 ===
- Alien vs Predator – Appealed its refusal of classification and won, receiving an MA15+ rating. The reason they deemed it as suitable for 15-year-olds is its science fiction context and how the mutilations were randomly generated and the player had no control over it.
- Charlie Wilson's War – Bob Debus, the Minister for Home Affairs at the time, appealed the M rating of the film as he thought the nudity should have given the film a higher and restricted MA15+. He failed and the film retained the same rating of M, though with the added consumer advice of 'partial nudity'.
- Friday the 13th (2009 remake) – Appealed its R18+ rating but lost due to how the violence frequently dwells on detail.
- Hydrolord the Game (board game) – Bob Debus, the Minister for Home Affairs at the time, tried to appeal the M rating of this board game to cause it to receive a restricted rating of 'Category 1 18+' due to drug references, the board found that the drug references were very discreet thus awarding it the same rating of M.
- Julie & Julia – Appealed its M rating and won in which it was re-rated PG for 'Infrequent coarse language'. It won the appeal as the word "fuck" was used briefly and can easily be missed and is used in context to calm another character down.
- Left 4 Dead 2 – Appealed its refusal of classification but lost. This was due to the relentlessly graphic and detailed depictions of violence and gore throughout the game and thus could not be accommodated at the MA15+ rating. The game later received an R18+ uncut after said rating was introduced for video games.
- The Loved Ones – Appealed its R18+ and won, it was then re-rated MA15+. This was due to that the most violent scenes generally had a dark comedic overtone to it thus reducing the impact.
- Stone Bros. – Appealed its MA15+ but failed. This was due to how, despite the film showing negative effects on drugs, there are certain scenes explicitly detailing how to actually form them.

=== 2008 ===
- F.E.A.R. 2 – Appealed its refusal of classification and was awarded with a MA15+. The board found that the violence was expected in its genre and the most violent events occurred without player control.
- Open Season 2 – Appealed its PG rating but failed as the violence was a bit too intense for younger viewers.
- Space Chimps – Successfully appealed its PG rating and won its G rating as the comedic overtone lessened the impact to young children.

=== 2007 ===
- 300 – Won its appeal and its R18+ was downgraded to a MA15+ due to how unrealistic the CGI effects were causing all the violence to be highly stylized.
- 30 Days of Night – Won its appeal and was awarded an MA15+ rating over its previous R18+. The reason was that it took place in a clear fantasy environment and that the vampires bled black blood lessening the impact.
- Notes on a Scandal – Lost its appeal and stayed with its MA15+ rating due to how sensitive the public is to sex with a minor even with the film's implied sex scenes.
- Sleuth (remake) – Successfully appealed its MA15+ rating for an M rating. The board found that the two uses of 'cunt' were, while aggressive, still infrequent.
- Saw IV – Was originally rated R18+ due to the violent/sadistic content and graphic bloodshed. It was decreased to MA15+ based on the content being similar to the previous installments, which were rated MA15+. The notable scenes were the eye gouging, autopsy scene, hair scalping scene and hammer bashing scenes.
- Sea Patrol (season 1) – Lost its appeal and stayed with its M rating due to certain scenes dwelling on detail of blood.

=== 2006 ===
- Marc Ecko's Getting Up: Contents Under Pressure – Federal Attorney-General Phil Ruddock applied to appeal the MA15+ of the rating to force into the RC (banned) territory. He succeeded and banned the game as the board noted that while all the violence, coarse language and drug references may be accommodated within the MA15+ category, the theme proved to be high impact due to the glorification of graffiti.
- Eragon – Lost its appeal of the M rating due to violence being too frequent to fit within the PG classification.
- Stormbreaker – As with Eragon, lost its appeal of the M rating due to the frequency of the violence.
- River Queen – Won its appeal for lowering its MA15+ rating for an M rating. This was due to the historical context of the film mitigating the impact.
- Ice Age: The Meltdown – Failed to lower its PG rating due its cumulative impact of menace.
- Harry Potter and the Goblet of Fire – Lost its appeal due to the dark nature of the film being deemed too impactful to fit into the PG category.
- Big Momma's House 2 – Won its appeal to lower its M rating into a PG rating. This was due to the overall comedic tone lessening the impact of the violence.

All appeals before 2006 were done when the review board was not owned by the Attorney-general's department but instead when it was overlooked by the Office of Film and Literature Classification (OFLC).

=== 2005 ===
- 50 Cent Bulletproof – Lost its appeal against refusal of classification due to the frequent detailed violence.
- A History of Violence – Won its appeal for a MA15+ rating as while the violence was very detailed and realistic, it was infrequent within the film.
- Mysterious Skin – Attorney-general Phil Ruddock appealed the R18+ rating in order to ban the film. He failed due to how the film does not glorify sexual abuse of children.
- Kingdom of Heaven – Won its appeal for an M rating due to the historical context of the film mitigating the impact.
- Palindromes - Failed to lower its R18+ due to themes of pedophilia.
- Wolf Creek – Lost its appeal and stayed as an R18+ due to how realistic and frequent the violence is.
- Wedding Crashers – Was awarded a downgrade to an M rating due to the sexual references being while frequent, only moderate in impact.
- The Gore Gore Girls – Failed to appeal its refusal of classification due to prolonged and graphic depictions of dismemberment.
- Constantine – Was awarded an M rating, down from its MA15+ due to how the violence was generally undetailed and stylised.
- Guess Who – Lost its appeal and stayed with its M rating due to how frequent the sexual references are.
- 9 Songs – Won its appeal for an R18+, it was originally given an X18+ but due to a technicality in the guidelines of how even fetishes are not allowed in the X18+ category, something which the classification board overlooked, they awarded it an R18+ based upon artistic merit.
- Fantastic Four – Won its appeal for a PG rating due to how highly stylised the violence was.

=== 2004 ===
- Sideways - Won its appeal for an unrestricted M rating due to the compassionate treatment of depression and alcoholism.
- A Very Long Engagement - Failed to lower its MA15+ rating due to injury detail and the strong sense of threat.
- Collateral - Failed to lower its MA15+ rating due to the strong depictions of violence.
- Shadow Theatre - The arthouse short film lowered its pornographic X18+ rating to a commercial R18+ due to its use of silhouettes and distorted imagery giving reasonable doubt to the potentially unsimulated sex scenes.
- Manhunt - Federal Attorney-General Philip Ruddock appealed the game's MA15+ rating resulting in the Review Board finding the violence to be high in impact. Due to the lack of a R18+ rating for video games at the time, Manhunt was refused classification as a result.
- Anatomy of Hell - The Australian Family Association attempted to appeal the rating in an attempt to ban the film. The Review Board disagreed and the film kept the R18+ rating due serious artistic merit.
- Bratz: Starrin' & Stylin' - Failed to lower its PG rating due to themes of peer pressure.
- Irréversible - Attorney-general Phil Ruddock appealed the R18+ rating in order to ban the film. He failed and the film kept the rating for serious artistic merit.
- Harry Potter and the Prisoner of Azkaban - Won its appeal for a PG rating due to its stylized nature lowering the impact of threat.
- Troy - Won its appeal for an unrestricted M rating as the violence was mitigated by the film's historical context.
- Haunted Mansion - Won its appeal for a PG rating due to the stylized fantasy elements mitigating the sequences of horror.

=== 2003 ===
- One Perfect Day - Won its appeal for an unrestricted M rating due its strong anti-drug message.
- Silverball Product Version 8 - Originally banned by the Classification Board due to sexuality and nudity in relation to incentives and rewards. The rating was successfully appealed and downgraded to an unrestricted M rating on the basis that the nude static images were incidental to gameplay rather than as a reward.
- Thirteen - The original rating was R18+, but the film won its appeal for a MA15+ due its non-exploitive and compassionate depiction of teenage drug use and self-harm.
- Ken Park - The Sydney Film Festival failed in its appeal against the refusal of classification for the film due to its prolonged and gratuitous depictions of child sex abuse.
- Basic - Failed to lower its MA15+ rating due to the violence having a strong impact despite the military context.
- Ned Kelly - Won its appeal to go from an MA15+ to an unrestricted M rating due to the historical context lowering the impact of the violence.
- Legacy of the Silver Shadow Volume 1 - Failed to lower its PG rating as the violence was not mitigated by the educational context.
- City of God - Failed to appeal its R18+ rating due to the film's unflinching and realistic portrayal of violence and drug use
- Phone Booth - Won its appeal for an unrestricted M rating due to the non-gratuitous nature of the coarse language.

=== 2002 ===
- Spirit: Stallion of the Cimarron – Won its appeal for a G rating due to there being a low sense of threat for children.
- Baise-Moi – Attorney-General Daryl Williams succeeded in appealing the film's R18+ rating resulting in a refusal of classification for "very high impact sexual violence throughout".
- Three Ballerinas – Awarded a G rating as the themes and language were deemed very mild and discreet in impact.
- Australian Rules – Awarded an M rating due to the drug use, violence, and coarse language being justified by its context and message. Thus, the film was only moderate in impact.
- E.T. the Extra-Terrestrial: 20th Anniversary Edition – Failed to lower its PG rating due to there being certain scenes that may be distressful for young children.
- Black Hawk Down – Was originally rated R18+ due to its graphic, relentless violence and injury detail. It was awarded an MA15+ on appeal as the violence was justified by its strong anti-war message.
- Great Moments in Science - Was downgraded from PG to G as the violence was mitigated by the educational context as well as the lack of blood.

=== 2001 ===
- Grand Theft Auto III - Although originally released with an MA15+, the board banned it after reviewing the classification. Take-Two Interactive, on behalf of Rockstar Games, failed to appeal the game's ban as the board found its depiction of sexual violence against prostitutes inappropriate for minors. Due to the lack of an R18+ for video games at the time; the game was banned again. A modified version lacking the ability to pick up prostitutes was released with an MA15+. The game was later rerated R18+ uncut in 2019.
- Joy Ride - The board decided to keep the MA15+ rating only to change the consumer advice to "Violence may disturb".
- Captain Corelli's Mandolin - The MA15+ rating was kept, but the consumer advice changed to "Occasional strong violence".
- Pokémon 3: The Movie - Failed to appeal its PG rating as the themes and violence were not discreet enough for a G. The consumer advice was however changed from "Adult themes, low level violence" to "Frequent violence, some themes may upset young children".
- Series 7: The Contenders - Kept its R18+ rating as its satirical tone failed to diminish the realistic violence.
- Dreamquest - Failed to appeal its ban as violence is not allowed in the X18+ category.
- The Mexican - Won its appeal for an unrestricted M rating due to the lack of detail within the violence.
- Hannibal - Attorney-General Daryl Williams successfully appealed the film's MA15+ to upgrade it to a R18+ for high impact violence. The film would later revert to its MA15+ rating for its Blu-ray release.

=== 2000 ===
- The Monkey's Mask – Lost its appeal to drop the R18+ due to the theme of fetishes not being treated discreetly enough to warrant an MA15+
- Almost Famous – Dropped its MA15+ to an M due to how the drug use was not exploitatively used in its depiction and shows its negative sides effects.
- The Color of Paradise – Successfully appealed its M to the PG rating. This was due to that the themes depicted are mitigated by their complicities for young children to understand.

=== 1999 ===
- The Blair Witch Project – Won its appeal to lower its MA15+ to M as while there were instances of aggressive strong language, they were limited to only two scenes and thus infrequent within the narrative.
- Eyes Wide Shut – Lost the appeal and stuck with its R18+, as the sex scenes were too realistic rather than implied/discreet to fit into the MA15+ rating.
- Fight Club – Lost appeal for the MA15+ rating as it had adult themes of a high degree of intensity that were not discreet.
- The General's Daughter – Won its appeal and lowered rating to MA15+, as the theme of rape was not high impact and the rape scene was more suggestive than graphic.
- The Iron Giant – Lost the appeal and stayed a PG, due to several scenes being too intense for young children.
- Human Traffic – Lost appeal for MA15+, due to its promotion of drugs as an escapism.
- Romance – Won its appeal to unban the film and rerated R18+, due to its serious intent and artistic merit despite explicit sex.
- Tarzan – Lost appeal to lower PG rating, due to several menacing themes that could not be accommodated at the G rating.
- Madness – Lost its appeal to lower its RC rating due to explicit sexual violence.

=== 1998 ===
- Analyze This – Lost its appeal to lower its MA15+ as it contained constant coarse language that was too aggressive to be in fit into the M rating. It was later re-rated M in 2003, and again in 2006.
- Saving Private Ryan – Won appeal to be rated MA15+ as despite having intense, prolonged graphic scenes of violence, they were non-gratuitous, infrequent and contained a strong anti-war message.
- Passion – Appeal failed as the pervasive theme of sado-masochistic behaviour could not fit into the MA15+ category.
- Hurrah – Won the MA15+ rating as the noted sex scene, while somewhat graphic, was shown in a series of shots mitigating its impact.

=== 1997 ===
- Anastasia – Appeal for a G rating failed due to the various scenes that were found to upset small children.
- Men in Black – Appeal failed as the violence was too frequent to be accommodated within the PG rating.
- FairyTale: A True Story – Won its appeal for a G rating as the themes were discreetly used to avoid distressing younger children.
- The Devil's Advocate – Lost its appeal for a MA15+ as the board noted that the sex and violence were gratuitously detailed and/or prolonged. In 2012 the film was re-rated MA15+ on Blu-ray uncensored, and an extended director's cut was also classified MA15+ uncensored.
- Primary Colors – Won its appeal to lower its MA15+ to an M rating as the frequent use of "fuck" was not gratuitous and contextually justified.
- Salò, or the 120 Days of Sodom – The Attorney general at the time appealed to ban the film (originally R18+) and was successful, the board noted the film depicted sexual violence as highly cruel and portrayed the characters in a demeaning manner. (It was rerated R18+ again in 2010)

== Members ==
As of June 2025, the current members of the Classification Review Board are:

- Alice Yan (convenor) – appointed December 2025 (term expires December 2027)
- Damien Power (deputy convenor) – appointed December 2025 (term expires December 2027)
- Bonnie Cooney – appointed December 2025 (term expires December 2027)
- Brook Hely – appointed December 2025 (term expires December 2027)
- Wendy Jasper – appointed December 2025 (term expires December 2027)
- Matthew Salgo – appointed December 2025 (term expires December 2027)

== See also ==
- Advertising Standards Bureau (Australia)
- Australian Classification Board – A statutory censorship and classification body for Australia
- Banned films – includes an extensive list of films banned in Australia
- Banned video games
- Censorship in Australia
- Internet censorship in Australia
- List of pornography laws by region – Australian hardcore pornography laws
- Video game controversy – includes the history of games censorship in Australia
