= Sexy Poker =

2004 video game

- Developer: Gameloft Montreal
- Publisher: Gameloft
- Platforms: Mobile phone, WiiWare
- Release: Mobile: EU: 2004; WiiWare: NA: August 3, 2009; EU: September 25, 2009
- Genre: Card
- Mode: Single-player

Sexy Poker is a strip poker video game by Gameloft Montreal released for mobile phones in 2004. A WiiWare version was released in North America on August 3, 2009 and in Europe on September 25, 2009. It is the first ESRB M-rated game to be released for WiiWare.

== Overview ==
The objective of the game is for players to win hands in order to remove articles of clothing from their female opponents, which are either portrayed by still photographs or manga-style artwork. Along with 5-card draw or Texas hold 'em poker, players can also compete in video poker and blackjack. The game also features a photo gallery mode.

The original game was followed by several sequels including Sexy Poker 2006, Sexy Poker Manga, and Sexy Poker Top Models. Compared to the mobile phone versions, the WiiWare version does not feature any nudity.

== Development ==
The WiiWare version of 'Poker' has been refused classification by the Australian Classification Board, with issues raised with the game's use of nudity as an incentive or reward for players, which is prohibited by the Office's current classification guidelines. The game was edited worldwide to remove nudity (whether this was due to problems with its ban in Australia is unknown) and this version of the game didn't even receive a MA15+ rating, but a more lucrative M rating due to sexual references.

== Reception ==
Nintendo Life called the WiiWare version "a letdown for fans of both poker and sexiness", citing the bare bones presentation, odd application of rules and lack of multiplayer and replayability. IGN believed that the game will only appeal to adolescents and those who download it as a joke.
