= Else Heart.Break() =

2015 video game

- Developer: Erik Svedäng
- Publisher: Erik Svedäng
- Artist: Niklas Åkerblad
- Engine: Unity
- Platforms: Windows; Linux; Mac OS X
- Release: September 24, 2015
- Genres: Adventure game, Programming game
- Mode: Single-player

Else Heart.Break() is a programming puzzle video game. It was developed by Erik Svedäng with art by Niklas Åkerblad.

== Development ==
Else Heart.Break() was developed by Swedish developer Erik Svedäng. Development began in 2010 after the release of Blueberry Garden. It was released on Windows, Linux, and Mac OS X on September 24, 2015.

== Reception ==
Reception

Aggregate score
Aggregator	Score
Metacritic	79/100

Review scores
Publication	Score
Adventure Gamers	3.5/5
PC Gamer (US)	86/100

Else Heart.Break() received generally positive reviews from video game critics.
