= Embrace (film) =

- Directed by: Taryn Brumfitt
- Written by: Taryn Brumfitt
- Produced by: Taryn Brumfitt; Anna Vincent
- Starring: Taryn Brumfitt
- Narrated by: Taryn Brumfitt
- Cinematography: Hugh Fenton
- Edited by: Lindi Harrison; Bryan Mason
- Music by: Benjamin Speed
- Production company: Southern Light Alliance
- Distributed by: Transmission Films
- Release dates: 12 June 2016 (Sydney Film Festival); 4 August 2016 (Australia)
- Running time: 90 minutes
- Country: Australia
- Language: English

Embrace is a 2016 Australian documentary film directed by Taryn Brumfitt. It concerns women's body image and is a response to surveys showing that 90% of women are "highly dissatisfied" with their bodies. It includes interviews with Mia Freedman, editor of the Australian Cosmopolitan and television talk-show hosts Amanda de Cadenet and Ricki Lake.

== Participants ==
- Renee Airya
- Jade Beall
- Amanda de Cadenet
- Mia Freedman
- Harnaam Kaur
- Ricki Lake
- B. Jeffrey Madoff
- Turia Pitt
- Melinda Tankard Reist
- Nora Tschirner
- Stefania Ferrario

== Release ==
The film was screened at the 2016 Sydney Film Festival and New Zealand International Film Festival.

== Rating ==
The film was originally classified MA 15+ by the Australian Classification Board, meaning that people under 15 could only legally view or purchase it when accompanied by an adult guardian. Brumfitt expressed outrage at this decision, which she pointed out put the film into the same category as Fifty Shades of Grey.

Following a review by the Australian Classification Review Board, it was subsequently re-classified M, which means it is no longer subject to any legal age restrictions.

Brumfitt fully welcomed this decision, stating, "I am thrilled that the right decision has been made. With rates of labiaplasty on the rise, particularly in teens, I knew how important it was to include the educational and informative vulva section in the film. Since the film's release I have been told every day that it must be seen in schools and now it can be. The Classification Board's decision means that Embrace can be more accessible to the people who need its message most."

Facebook is reported to have barred the film's poster on the basis that it shows "excessive skin".

== Reception ==
The Guardian wrote that it "should be essential viewing for young people," but that older viewers may feel that it re-treads familiar ground. SBS expressed similar sentiments about its value for young women. Both SBS and the Sydney Morning Herald noted that it is well-edited, maintaining a good pace despite its length.
