= Jonatan Söderström =

Swedish video game designer

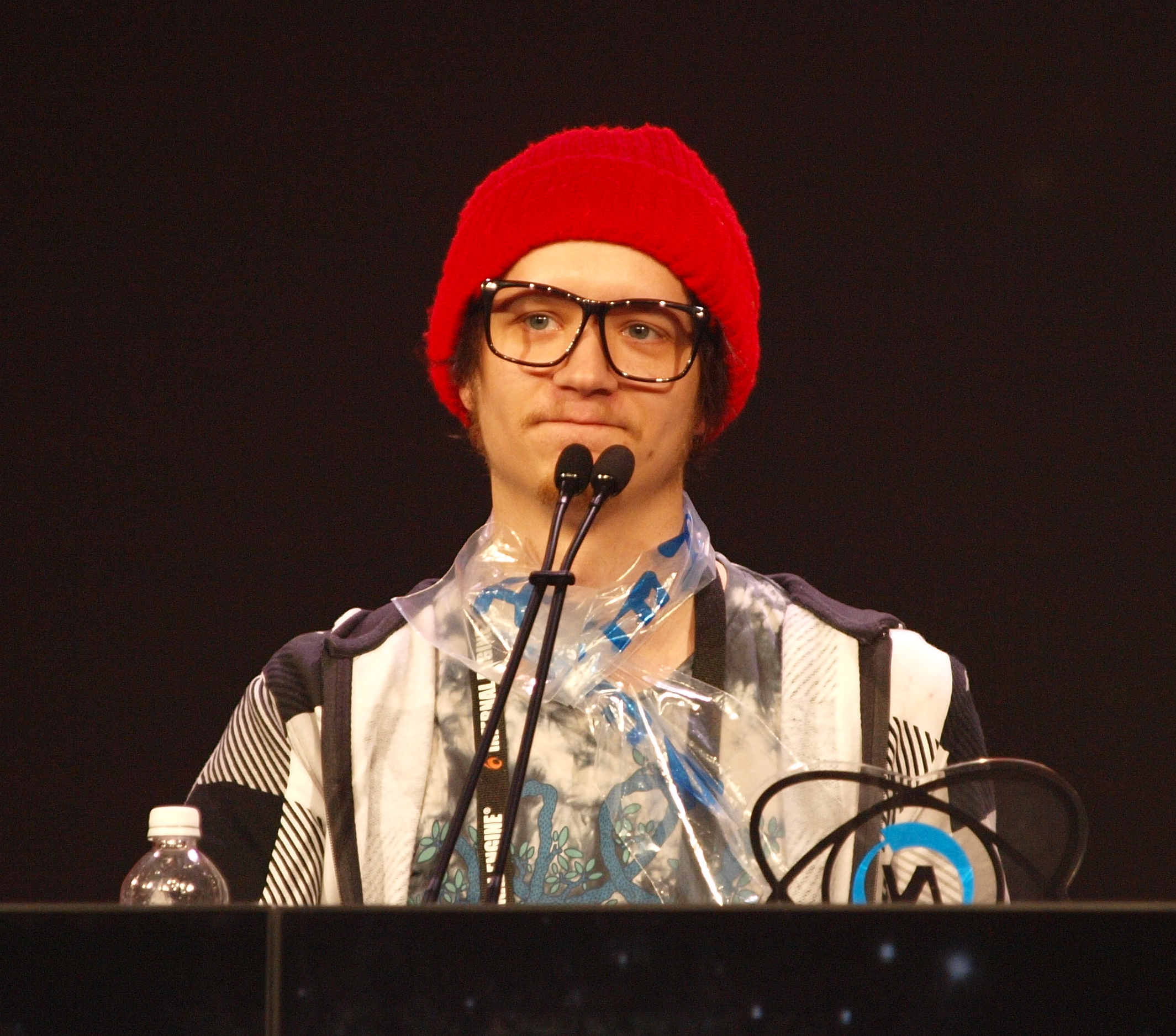
- Söderström at the Independent Games Festival in 2010
- Born: October 9, 1985 (age 40); Sweden
- Occupation: Game designer
- Years active: 2005-present

Jonatan Söderström (born 9 October 1985), also known as Cactus, is a Swedish video game developer. He is best-known as the co-designer and programmer of Hotline Miami (2012) and Hotline Miami 2: Wrong Number (2015), but had prior to those games developed over 40 small freeware games, many of which were positively-received. Söderström's game Clean Asia! was nominated for both Excellence In Visual Arts and Excellence in Audio at the Independent Games Festival in 2008. In 2010, he won the IGF's Nuovo Award, which honours unconventional game development, for his puzzler Tuning.

All of Söderström's games prior to Hotline Miami were created with Game Maker, and he was one of the most-influential developers in the Game Maker community, together with others like Derek Yu. At the GDC 2009, he delivered a talk called "The Four-Hour Game Design", describing the methods he uses in producing his games.

== Games ==
The games Söderström has created include:

- Ad Nauseam
- Ad Nauseam 2
- Arms
- BlockOn!
- Brave Karma Warriors
- Burn the Trash
- Clean Asia!
- Decontrologic
- EVAC
- Fractal Fighters
- Fuck Space
- God Came to the Cave
- Hot Throttle
- Hotline Miami
- Hotline Miami 2: Wrong Number
- Illegal Communication
- Insect Invade 2
- Keyboard Drumset Fucking Werewolf
- KrebsWelte
- Krytza
- Life is a Race!
- Minubeat
- Mondo Agency
- Mondo Medicals
- MSoids
- Ninja Flu
- Norrland
- Precision
- Strings
- Protoganda II
- Psychosomnium
- Retro
- Retro II
- Retro 4
- Saru Ga Daisuki
- Seizuredome
- Shotgun Ninja
- Space Fuck!
- Stallions In America
- Ted's Wet Adventure
- The Birthday
- The Design
- This Is Infinity
- Tuning (winner of the Sublime Experience award at IndieCade in 2009)
- Unholy Stage
- Xoldiers
- xWUNG
