= Taryn Brumfitt =

Australian body acceptance activist

- Born: 1977 or 1978 (age 48–49); Australia
- Occupations: Body acceptance activist, writer, filmmaker
- Years active: 2012–present
- Partner(s): Matt Brumfitt (m. 2002/03, div. 2020); Tim Pearson
- Children: 3
- Website: tarynbrumfitt.com

Taryn Brumfitt (born 1977 or 1978) is an Australian body positivity advocate, writer, photographer, and filmmaker, known for founding the Body Image Movement and for her 2016 documentary film Embrace. The crowdfunded film Embrace Kids, intended for use in schools, was released in 2022.

== Early life and education ==
Brumfitt was born in 1977 or 1978.

She attended Unley High School in the Adelaide suburb of Netherby.

== Career ==
Brumfitt was first a photographer. After the birth of her third child, she considered cosmetic surgery, as she was unhappy with the appearance of her body, but took up body building instead.

Brumfitt founded the Body Image Movement in 2012. In 2017 the Body Image Movement described itself as "on a quest to end the global body-hating epidemic" and "working to put an end to body loathing and spread the message of body loving". It aimed to recruit a Body Image Movement Global Ambassador Program (BIMGAP), of people who would spread its message internationally through social media and local contacts.

In 2016 Brumfitt's film Embrace was released. Brumfitt gave a talk at the TEDx event in Adelaide in 2016.

From around 2019 the movement crowdfunded for a documentary film, Embrace Kids, aimed at children aged 8-12, to make available to schools around the world. Featuring many well-known entertainers and artists, such as Celeste Barber, the duo Electric Fields, Jameela Jamil, and Chloé Hayden, the film was released in 2022, listed on IMDb as Embrace: Kids.

In 2023, Brumfitt published Chico the Schnauzer, a children's book which encourages its readers "to enjoy the diversity of their own bodies, interests and talents".

== Recognition ==
In September 2018 Brumfitt was named one of The Australian Financial Review's 100 Women of Influence in the Global category.

She was named 2023 Australian of the Year in January 2023.

In 2024 Brumfitt was awarded an honorary doctorate by Flinders University.

== Personal life ==
Brumfitt experienced family tragedy when her brother Jason died of a heroin overdose aged 28.

She married Mathew (Mat) Brumfitt in 2002 or 2003. He had previously worked in logistics but gave up that career to become the managing director of the Body Image Movement. They have three children. They divorced in 2020.

She married Tim Pearson on 2 March 2023.

On 10 October 2023, Brumfitt was one of 25 Australians of the Year who signed an open letter supporting the Yes vote in the Indigenous Voice referendum, initiated by psychiatrist Patrick McGorry.

== Selected publications ==
- Brumfitt, Taryn (2015). Embrace : my story from body loather to body lover. New Holland. ISBN 9781742576183.
- Brumfitt, Taryn (2018). Embrace yourself. Penguin Australia. ISBN 9780143787051.
- Brumfitt, Taryn (2022). Embrace Kids : How you can help your kids to love and celebrate their bodies. Penguin Australia. ISBN 9781761046575.
- Brumfitt, Taryn (2023). Chico the Schnauzer. Illustrated by Levi George. Puffin. ISBN 978-1761343988.
