= Clean Asia! =

2007 video game

- Title screen
- Developer(s): Jonatan Söderström
- Engine: GameMaker
- Platform(s): Windows
- Release: February 1, 2007
- Genre(s): Scrolling shooter
- Mode(s): Single-player

Clean Asia! is a freeware vertically scrolling shooter video game. It was developed by Jonatan "Cactus" Söderström and released for Windows on February 1, 2007.

== Gameplay ==
Backgrounds are completely black, with enemies and the player appearing as outlines. Bright neon colors are used, giving the game a hypnotic atmosphere. The two ships, known as the Attractor and Reflector, have different gameplay styles. The Attractor is the most unconventional, possessing no weapons, and attacking by ramming enemies and shooting fragments at other enemies. This ship may pick up weapons dropped by enemies. The Reflector is more traditional, with regular weapons. The gun of the Reflector can be charged, causing the player's fighter to stop moving. Gathering debris causes the player to level up, giving them shields and a bomb-like weapon.

== Plot ==
In the future, the eyes of all the humans are revealed as intelligent unto themselves, having merely used humans as their hosts. They leave their bodies and fly to the moon, develop weapons, and attack the human race, capturing several Asian countries, including China, Thailand, and Korea. Humanity sends two blinded pilot brothers, Mickey R. Dole and Mackey I. Dole, who both possess a sixth sense, to defeat the invaders. The pilots cover their eyes with different methods – a double eyepatch and shaded glasses. Each pilot's custom fighter uses a different attacking technique.

== Development ==
Clean Asia! was started as a 2007 competition entry at shmup-dev.com. The competition's criteria were that the game had to be a shoot 'em up, and include an autofire function. The game was developed using GameMaker, while the music was licensed from another composer. It later won the prize of $200. Söderström tried to be as original as possible when designing the game, drawing inspiration from the ability to pick up enemy debris in 'Nvaders, a game which he thought felt "slightly rushed" and "incomplete". He was also inspired by another, unnamed shoot 'em up, in which the player is able to use an enemy's weapons against them. Söderström believes that the game's most creative aspect is the gameplay of the Attractor. Clean Asia! was developed during the span of two months, with most content being created in the last few weeks.

The game was later released as part of an arcade game compilation, Cactus Arcade.

== Reception ==
Patrick Murphy of Gamasutra called Clean Asia "uniquely presented and stylish", noting that it had an "original, polished visual style". Anthony Burch of Destructoid said that the decision to allow the player to use pieces of defeated enemies as ammunition "takes the SHMUP conventions we’re all familiar with and turns them on their heads", describing the game as "really hard. But in a good way". He stated that "if you only ever download one free SHMUP this year, make it Clean Asia!", praising the "slick" graphics and the main design conceit as "stunningly simple". James Murff of Big Download called the game "a sublime shooter", saying it was both traditional and unconventional. IndieGames.com compared the game to Warning Forever and Tumiki Fighters.

=== Awards ===
Clean Asia! was a finalist in the 2008 Independent Games Festival awards for "Excellence In Visual Arts" and "Excellence in Audio".
