= Australian Classification Board =

Classification agency of films, video games and literary works in Australia

Classification Board

Agency overview
- Formed: 1917; 109 years ago (as Commonwealth Film Censorship Board)
- Jurisdiction: Commonwealth of Australia
- Minister responsible: Anika Wells, Minister for Communications
- Parent agency: Department of Infrastructure, Transport, Regional Development, Communications, Sport and the Arts (current parent agency), Department of Communications and the Arts (until 2020), OFLC (until 2006), Australian Classification Review Board (sister agency)
- Website: www.classification.gov.au

The Australian Classification Board (ACB or CB) is an Australian government statutory body responsible for the classification and censorship of films, television programmes, video games and publications for exhibition, sale or hire in Australia. The ACB is located in Sydney.

The ACB was established in 1917 as the Commonwealth Film Censorship Board. In 1988 it was incorporated for administrative purposes into the Office of Film and Literature Classification (OFLC), until its dissolution in 2006. Following the legislative changes enacted in the Classification (Publications, Films and Computer Games) Act 1995 (No. 7 (Cth)), it became known as the Classification Board.

The ACB is made up of a director, a deputy director, and three other board members, appointed by the government for three- or four-year terms, and temporary board members. The ACB does not directly censor material by ordering cuts or changes. However, it is able to effectively censor media by refusing classification and making the media illegal for hire, exhibition and importation to Australia.

The classification system has several levels of "restricted" categories, prohibiting sale, exhibition or use of some materials to those who are under a prescribed age. Some documentaries and films (those made for educational or training purposes, for instance) are exempt from classification under certain conditions.

== History ==
=== Early film classification ===
The Commonwealth Film Censorship Board was created in 1917 to view, classify, and censor films imported from overseas. In the early years of the system there were 3 ratings:

- G "for general exhibition"
- A for "not suitable for children"
- SOA for "suitable for adults only"

All ratings were advisory in nature and while distributors were required to display them on advertising, there were no restrictions on children's attendance. As such, films with adult ratings were still routinely censored.

=== 1970s–1980s classifications reform ===
Customs Minister Don Chipp announced significant classification reform in 1970, including published decision registrars and the requirement of cinemas to legally restrict attendees. This ushered in a new era of film classification rather than censorship, and was enacted in 1971. The new ratings introduced were:

- G for "general exhibition; suitable for everyone"
- NRC for "not recommended for children under 12"
- M for "mature audiences; suitable for persons 15 years and over"
- R for "restricted exhibition; children aged 3-17 are not admitted"

In 1984, the NRC rating was renamed PG, due to confusion from parents about whether its content was stronger than M.

=== 1990s; Modifications and computer game classifications ===
In 1993, the MA 15+ rating was introduced to flag content that was too strong for the M classification, but not so much so that the content should be restricted only to persons over the age of 18. Until 1997, the prescribed marking for the MA15+ rating was, "Restrictions apply to persons under 15 years", before it was later changed to "Persons under 15 years must be accompanied by a parent or adult guardian" once DVD became prevalent. The Office of Film and Literature Classification (OFLC) was reorganised in 1994, and oversaw the ACB.

A separate classification system was introduced in 1994 for computer and video games. Despite its use of similar ratings names, these were backed by a distinct and stricter set of guidelines. The OFLC Annual Report for 1993-94 cited ministerial concern that "games, because of the “interactive” nature, may have greater impact, and therefore greater potential for harm or detriment, on young minds than film or videotape".

The four ratings were:

- G for "general; suitable for all ages"
- G 8+ for "general; suitable for children 8 years and over"
- M 15+ for "mature; suitable for children 15 years and over"
- MA 15+ for "mature - restricted; restricted to persons 15 years and over"

=== 2000s–present ===
In 2005 the OFLC was dissolved and supervision of the ACB transferred to the attorney-general's department. The current colour-coded classification markings for films and computer games were introduced in May 2005. Moreover, the age descriptors and markers for the advisory ratings such as PG and M15+ were removed. As such, on the descriptors of posters, streaming and home video, the PG rating now only has the signifier, "Parental guidance recommended", and the M rating has "Recommended for mature audiences", without any reference to 15 years.

In 2005, video and computer games became subject to the same classification ratings and restrictions as films, such as G 8+ being replaced by PG (with the exception of the R 18+ and X 18+ ratings), in response to confusion by parents. Despite a line in the National Classification Code stating that "adults should be able to read, hear and see what they want", the adults-only R 18+ classification was not applied to video games in Australia until 1 January 2013. The Department of Communications and the Arts provided administrative support to the ACB from 2006 until 2020, when it was merged into the 'mega department' of the Department of Infrastructure, Transport, Regional Development and Communications. Decisions made by the ACB may be reviewed by the Australian Classification Review Board.

In August 2014, the ACB introduced amendments to allow for the automated classification process employed by the International Age Rating Coalition (IARC). This new process reduces the costs of video game developers as they seek to obtain ratings for their products that are distributed digitally online. In January 2019, for the first time, Netflix was given the go-ahead to self-regulate film and television classification on its streaming platform, allowing the company to rank content between G and R 18+.

== Overview ==
The board operates on a procedure that primarily involves decision-making. The members must communicate their views clearly and appreciate the views of others. Board members would be exposed to a wide range of material, including content that is confronting and offensive. Every film and computer game has to be classified before it can be legally made available to the public. Some publications also need to be classified. Failure to give classification (especially for unclassified material that is likely to be classified RC) is an implicit ban (except for exempt films, games, and publications). It is an offence "to display, demonstrate, sell, hire, publicly exhibit or advertise a film or computer game" without having it classified. Some films and documentaries (such as current affairs and those created for business, scientific and education purposes) are exempt from classification unless, if classified, they would be M or above.

There are legal age restrictions for the ratings of MA 15+ and R 18+. X 18+ is a special restriction rating for pornographic content. X 18+ is limited only to films, and the highest rating for video games remains R 18+. Should a game contain content not suitable for or exceeding the boundaries of an R 18+ rating (often explicit sexual content or nudity), that game is usually either modified (censored) or, rarely, refused classification (banned) (an exception to this was made for The Last of Us Part II, where the game was not censored despite containing nudity). The other classification categories (G, PG and M) are merely recommendations and they are not submitted to legal age restrictions. RC (banned) material cannot be sold, hired or distributed to anyone. A film or video game's context is crucial in determining whether a classifiable element is justified by the story-line or themes.

The ACB decides what consumer advice accompanies each classification. They indicate the elements in films and computer games which caused the classification and help consumers make choices about what they read, view or play. There are six classifiable elements for films: themes (rape, suicide, racism, etc.), violence (the level of violence and how threatening it is in its context), sex (intercourse and references to sex), language (the level of coarse language), drug use (the use of, and references to, drugs) and nudity (the explicitness of nudity). Consumer advice appears with the classification symbol on products, packaging and in advertisements. Consumer advice is not given if the element in question would be acceptable at a lower classification. By August 2020, the ACB added another category for video games related to microtransactions, with any game including them listing in-game purchases alongside these other themes.

Film festivals and institutions such as Australian Centre for the Moving Image (ACMI) may apply to the ACB for an exemption from classification for the purpose of screening at a particular film festival or event. If the ACB believes an unclassified work, in their estimation, would receive an X 18+ classification if it were to be classified they would not grant an exemption for public screening, as an X 18+ cannot be exhibited. The ACB may require film festivals to have age-restricted entrance to a festival or screening. The ACB also classifies material submitted by the police, the Australian Customs and Border Protection Service and the Australian Communications and Media Authority. The board does not classify live performances, audio CDs and television shows. Television is regulated by the Australian Communications and Media Authority. Film classification also normally applies to Internet streaming services. The ACB now operates under the Classification (Publications, Films and Computer Games) Act 1995 (No. 7 (Cth)).

== Film and video game classifications ==
=== Unrestricted/Advisory ===
The classifications below are unrestricted and may suggest parental advisory, but do not otherwise impose any legal restrictions on access to or distribution of material.

Classification	Description
Exempt (E)	Only very specific types of material (including educational material and artistic performances) can be exempted from classification, and the material cannot contain anything that exceeds the constraints of the PG classification. The assessment of exemption may be made by the distributor or exhibitor (self-assessed) without needing to submit the product for certification by the ACB. Self-assessed exempt films cannot use the official marking, although it is advised that films and computer games that are self-assessed as exempt display, "This film/computer game is exempt from classification".
General (G)	Contains material available for general viewing, i.e. suitable for viewing by persons of all ages. This category does not necessarily designate a children's film or game. Although not mandatory at this category, the board may provide consumer information, usually in relation to impacts on very young children. The content is very mild in impact.: Themes should have a very low sense of threat or menace, and be justified by context.; Violence should have only a low sense of threat or menace, and be justified by context.; Sexual activity should be very mild and very discreetly implied, and be justified by context.; Coarse language should be very mild and infrequent, and be justified by context.; Drug use should be implied only very discreetly, and be justified by context.; Nudity should be justified by context.
Parental Guidance (PG)	Contains material that is not recommended for viewing by persons under the age of 15 without guidance from parents or guardians. This category includes material that younger viewers may find confusing or upsetting. The content is mild in impact.: Themes should have a very low sense of threat or menace, and be justified by context.; Violence should be mild and infrequent, and be justified by context. Sexual violence is not permitted.; Sexual activity should be mild and discreetly implied, and be justified by context.; Coarse language should be mild and infrequent, and be justified by context.; Sex, nudity and drug use should be mild, infrequent, "discreetly implied" and "justified by context".; Drug use and nudity should be justified by context.
Mature (M)	Contains material that is recommended for viewing by persons aged 15 years and over. However, people under 15 may legally access such material since this category carries no legal restrictions. This category includes material that may require a mature perspective, but is not deemed too strong for younger viewers. The content is moderate in impact, although in recent years, the "moderate" indicator prefix is omitted from the consumer advice, e.g. "moderate violence" is referred to as "violence".: Themes may have a moderate sense of threat or menace, if justified by context.; Moderate violence is permitted, if "justified by context". Sexual violence should be very limited and justified by context.; Sexual activity should be discreetly implied, if "justified by context".; Coarse language may be used. Aggressive or strong coarse language should be infrequent and justified by context.; Drug use and nudity should be justified by context.

=== Restricted ===
By contrast, the classifications below are legally restricted, as explicitly indicated by the black banner at the bottom of the classification label. It is illegal to sell or exhibit material with these classifications to anyone younger than the stated minimum age and is punishable by fines under state laws.

Classification	Description
Mature Accompanied (MA 15+)	Contains material that is considered unsuitable for exhibition to persons under the age of 15. People under 15 may legally purchase, rent, exhibit or view such content, but only under the supervision of a parent or adult guardian. A person may be asked to show proof of age before purchasing or hiring an MA 15+ film or computer game at a retail store or cinema. The content is strong in impact.: Realistic violence of medium intensity is permitted. Violent depictions with a "high degree or realism" is accepted only if "justified by context". Stylised violence, however, can be "more detailed".; Strong violence is permitted, although if it is bloody and strong, it should be "infrequent" or "justified by context".; Sexual violence is permitted only if it is "not frequent, gratuitous or exploitative".; Sexual activity may be "discreetly implied" or "simulated".; Nudity is permitted, but in a sexual context, it should "not be exploitative".; Frightening or intense scenes should "not disturb a reasonable adult".; Aggressive and very strong coarse language may be used, but it should "not be exploitative".; Drug use may be depicted, but not in an "advocatory manner".; Themes, if strong, should be justified by context.
Restricted (R 18+)	Contains material that is considered unsuitable for exhibition to persons under the age of 18. People under 18 may not legally purchase, rent, exhibit or view R 18+ classified content. A person may be asked for proof of age before purchasing, hiring or viewing an R 18+ film or computer game at a retail store or cinema. Some material classified R 18+ may be offensive to sections of the adult community. The content is high in impact. This rating is the highest that can be given to computer games.: Realistic and explicit depictions of violence are permitted, but violence that is "frequently gratuitous, cruel, exploitative and offensive to a reasonable adult" is not.; Themes can have a "very high degree of intensity" but should not be "exploitative".; Sexual violence is permitted only to the extent that it is "necessary to the narrative" and "not exploitative" or "not shown in detail".; Sexual activity can be "realistically simulated", but depictions of "actual sexual activity" are not permitted. However, several films containing artistic depictions of real sexual activity such as Romance and Nymphomaniac have been passed with the R 18+ classification.; Drug use can be shown, but "not gratuitously detailed", and should also "not be promoted or encouraged". For computer games, drug use related to "incentives and rewards" is not permitted.; Nudity in a sexual context should "not include obvious genital contact".; Coarse language is virtually unrestricted.
Restricted (X 18+)	Contains material that is pornographic in nature. People under 18 may not legally purchase, rent, possess, exhibit or view these films. The exhibition or sale of these films to people under the age of 18 years is a criminal offence carrying a maximum fine of $13,750. Films classified as X 18+ are banned (via state government legislation) from being sold or rented in all Australian states, but are legal to possess (except in prescribed parts of the Northern Territory) and are legally available to purchase only in the Australian Capital Territory and the Northern Territory. Importing X 18+ material from these territories to the states is legal (as the Australian Constitution forbids any restrictions on trade between the states and territories). The content is sexually explicit and is therefore very high in impact.: This rating applies to films that "depict unsimulated sexual content only". Depictions of sexual violence, coercion and "sexually assaultive" language are not permitted in the category. Fetishes such as body piercing, urolagnia, bondage, spanking or fisting are also not permitted.

=== Other labels ===
Classification	Description
Refused Classification (RC)	Contains material that, while being (in most cases) legal to possess, is considered offensive to the standards of morality, decency and propriety generally accepted by a "reasonable adult" to such an extent that it should not be classified. In Australia, all films and video games must be classified by law, and works that are refused classification by the ACB are legally banned from sale, hire or public exhibition, carrying a maximum fine of $825,000 and/or 10 years imprisonment if an individual or organisation is found to be in breach of this. It is legal for people over 18 to possess RC films and games, except in Western Australia and prescribed areas of the Northern Territory and/or if they contain illegal content (such as child sexual abuse). The content is very high in impact.: Films and games that exceed the X 18+ and R 18+ ratings (respectively) are refused classification by the ACB. Content that may be refused classification includes, but is not limited to: Detailed instruction or promotion in matters of crime or violence; Promotion or provision of instruction in paedophile activity; Descriptions or depictions of child sexual abuse or any other exploitative or offensive descriptions or depictions involving a person who is, or appears to be, a child under 18 years; Gratuitous, exploitative or offensive depictions of: violence with a very high degree of impact or which are excessively frequent, prolonged or detailed; cruelty or real violence which are very detailed or which have an extremely high impact; sexual violence; Depictions of practices such as bestiality, necrophilia or other practices that are considered revolting or abhorrent; Gratuitous, exploitative or offensive depictions of: activity accompanied by fetishes or practices that are offensive or abhorrent; incest fantasies or other fantasies that are offensive or abhorrent
Check the Classification (CTC)	The content has been assessed and approved for advertising unclassified films and computer games. "This film has advertising approval. Check the classification closer to the released date" is usually written on the marking.: Any advertising of unclassified films and games must display the CTC message on posters, trailers, on the Internet, and any other types of advertising.; Once the content is classified, the classification marking replaces the CTC marking on all advertising material.

== Literature ratings ==
Publications such as books and magazines (though they would also include other printed media such as calendars, cards and catalogues) are required to be classified if they contain depictions or descriptions of sexuality, drugs, nudity or violence that are unsuitable for a minor or an adult who would take offence if sold as an unrestricted publication.

Publication classifications are most commonly applied to magazines with visual depictions of nudity or sexual activity, such as many men's magazines. It is uncommon for these ratings to appear on books, even those dealing with adult themes, except in the most controversial cases.

Classification	Description
Unrestricted Unrestricted with the consumer advice M (Mature)	These publications have no legal restrictions and are therefore available to persons of all ages, although content may or may not be suitable for readers under 15 years.
Category 1 Restricted (CAT 1)	These publications are not available to persons under 18 years. These may contain images of sexualised nudity. They must be distributed in a sealed wrapper. Their covers must be suitable for public display.
Category 2 Restricted (CAT 2)	Just like Category 1 Restricted restricted publications, they are not available to persons under 18 years. However, they contain explicit images of actual sexual activity which are not permissible under Category 1 Restricted, and may only be displayed in sites that are restricted to adults. Therefore, no publications that are likely to be classified Category 2 Restricted may be displayed in any public registered event.
Refused Classification (RC)	RC publications are banned and cannot be sold or displayed anywhere in Australia. The restricted publications are for adults and they are not to be sold to people under 18 (and in Queensland under state law). They have content, such as nudity or explicit sexual content, that could offend some sections of the adult community. The restricted categories are subject to various restrictions in different states; for example, one or both categories may only be sold in adults-only premises in certain states. For this reason, some adult magazines are published in two editions in Australia, or just one edited edition which can be sold anywhere with a warning, as unrestricted mature.

== Proposals ==
=== Age reference removal ===
In February 2020, the board proposed to remove the reference to 15 years for PG and M classifications and simply just refer to the severity of the material. This is due to a confusion that is caused by each of the categories citing to a 15-year-old, in addition to both the PG and M content not being recommended for persons under 15 years. The age reference created confusion for parents and guardians, creating some questions, such as why an M level film can still be accessed by a person under 15 without guidance because it is not a legally restricted category, when the impact of its material is higher than that of PG material. There is a confusion for people that comes from knowing the suited audience for PG, M and MA 15+ films and games due to their definitions that revolve around 15 years of age. The notes in the guidelines that come with the PG, M and MA ratings should be read like this:

- PG: "Content classified PG may not be of interest to a child or young person. Some content may contain material which some children and young people may find confusing or upsetting and parental guidance is recommended."
- M: "Content classified M is not suitable for children. Parental guidance may be required for young people."
- MA 15+: "Content classified MA 15+ is legally restricted to people aged 15 years and over. However, young people aged under 15 years can legally access this content when accompanied by an adult who may need to provide guidance. "

=== New rating category ===
In February 2020, the board had suggested the adoption of a PG-13-type classification category, which is a rating aimed at young teens (between PG and M), that addresses the mild+ impact level material. Its adoption was suggested because many films in recent years surpass what conforms to the PG rating and are, consequentially, pushed up into an M ("moderate impact") rating category due to their dark themes and peril, despite being films aimed at younger teens. The mild+ category, if introduced, could excel the mild impact level (PG), but not so as to require a mature perspective (M classification) and it could be relevant for films with a more significant amount of action or fantasy violence. If the rating is implemented, the non-restricted classifications would read like this:

- G – General (very mild impact)
- PG – Parental guidance (mild impact)
- Young person (mild+ impact)
- M – Mature (moderate impact)

This would mean the age restrictive numbers (15 and 18) would only be present for the legally-restricted categories of MA 15+, R 18+ and X 18+. The ACB is not suggesting that the new PG-13 rating would be applied retrospectively, but rather prospectively, as was the case when the MA 15+ category was initiated and when R 18+ was adopted for video games. The ACB is also not planning to use the PG-13 title for the new classification category, but a title that does not reference any age, such as YP for "young person" (or, likely, T for "teenager").

=== Literature classification ===
The ACB considers the present classification categories for publications to be redundant, complex, and inappropriate for the digital world. Therefore, the board has proposed the creation of the equivalent film and games classifications of M, R 18+ and X 18+ for publications, like:

- Unrestricted publication classification – M
- Category 1 Restricted publication classification – R 18+
- Category 2 Restricted publication classification – X 18+

== Controversies ==
=== Film ===
- Pasolini's Salò, or the 120 Days of Sodom has twice been banned in Australia. The Home Affairs Minister, Brendan O'Connor, asked the Classification Review Board to reassess the decision; however, the review failed to find any fault in the classification. The film was banned in 1998, and was released after two failed attempts in September 2010, when the ACB classified an uncut version of Salò R 18+, mainly due to extra material providing greater context.
- In 1992, Island World Communications Ltd and Manga Entertainment Australia Ltd had Urotsukidoji: Legend of the Overfiend submitted to the OFLC. It was the first animated feature to be banned in Australia and the feature was banned outright, similar to Violence Jack. Urotsukidoji was then censored to meet the OFLC's standards. The Australian version is the most censored in the Western world. Many fans of anime imported uncensored versions of Urotsukidoji: Legend of the Overfiend from the UK. The rest of the Urotsukidoji series was censored in Australia, with many still importing or downloading the American versions.
- Ninja Scroll was originally released in 1994 in Australia by Manga Entertainment Ltd. It originally had the MA 15+ rating on the VHS, but this was overturned in 1997 when Phillip Ruddock had the anime reviewed after an uncut screening of the movie on the SBS. A few months later it was given an R 18+ rating and was uncut, then edited again, eventually using the BBFC cut of it. This was overturned in 2003 when Madman Entertainment and Manga Entertainment Ltd. released the uncut version.
- Romance, a new crop within the arthouse genre, which features short scenes of actual sex began to attract closer scrutiny. The film was initially refused classification in Australia, before it was awarded an R 18+ on appeal. It single-handedly paved the way for actual sex to be accommodated in the R 18+ classification in Australia.
- Baise-moi, a French film about two prostitutes who take violent revenge after being raped. In 2000, the film was classified as R 18+. On 10 May 2002, the film was subsequently banned and pulled from cinemas and still remains prohibited in Australia to this day due to exploitative and offensive depictions of sexual violence, extreme violence and depictions of behavior and fetishes that are considered offensive or abhorrent.
- Ken Park, an American film about teenagers that features a scene of autoerotic asphyxiation, among other sexually explicit scenes. The ban, however, is actually due to exploitative sexual depiction of minors, which is a criminal offence in Australia. In response to the ban, a protest screening was held which was shut down by the police.
  - Prominent movie reviewer Margaret Pomeranz, then host of The Movie Show on the SBS, was arrested (and later cautioned and released) along with several others after attempting to screen at a hall what she described as "a wonderful film". Tom Gleisner, host of The Panel (a prime-time comedy show), openly stated on the show that he had downloaded and watched the film.
  - Former New South Wales Premier Bob Carr stated that he thought the banning of Ken Park and other films was inappropriate, and that his attorney-general, Bob Debus, would discuss changing the laws with other state attorneys-general at an upcoming meeting.
- In October 2017 the classification board was described as homophobic by Luke Buckmaster on flicks.com.au for classifying the film Tom of Finland as R 18+ for high impact sexualised imagery and nudity. The board disputed the allegation, stating that it had classified the film in accordance with its published guidelines and that the distributor had sought R 18+ conditions for its screenings at the 2017 Scandinavian Film Festival. Buckmaster also compared what he perceived to be the board's heavy-handed approach unfavorably to Netflix, which he argued was permitted to regulate its own content. The board disagreed with this comparison, noting that it was piloting a scheme to streamline the classification of Netflix content in Australia.

=== Video games ===
Video gaming censorship in Australia is considered to be one of the strictest in the Western world. Such controversial and noteworthy cases include:

- Grand Theft Auto III was withdrawn from sale for allowing players to have sexual intercourse with prostitutes; the game was later reinstated when this action was removed. Specifically, the player could solicit intercourse from a prostitute, and then kill her. The ability to solicit sex from prostitutes in the game was the action that was removed, but in-game characters and pedestrians could still kill them. Grand Theft Auto: Vice City was also pre-censored for the same reasons. Though, in 2010 Vice City was classified uncut again receiving an MA 15+ and an uncensored version of GTA 3 was given an R 18+ in 2019.
- Grand Theft Auto: San Andreas was withdrawn from sale in July 2005 following the revelation that an interactive sex minigame was included in the content files on the game's disc; one could not ordinarily access this, but a third party modification, known as the Hot Coffee mod, allowed the player to access the minigame and the inclusion of the scenes on the game disc took the game outside the MA 15+ category. The MA 15+ rating was re-instated after a modified version was released worldwide by Rockstar Games, removing the content files for the sex scenes.
- Grand Theft Auto IV was also pre-censored prior to classification and release in the Australian region. In the American release, sexual encounters with prostitutes occur inside the player's vehicle and the player has the ability to rotate the camera for a clearer view of what transpires. In the censored Australian version, the camera is fixed behind the vehicle, which rocks from side to side with accompanying audio effects. It is impossible for the player to view the inside of the car. Rockstar later submitted the uncut version of the game, which went on to receive the same MA 15+ rating as its censored counterpart, and a patch was released for the PS3, PC and Xbox 360 to uncensor the game.
- 50 Cent: Bulletproof was banned for encouraging gang violence. A version removing the game's arcade mode, cutting down on gore, and with an automatic game over for killing innocents was given an MA 15+ rating.
- Fallout 3 was refused classification by the OFLC due to the "realistic visual representations of drugs and their delivery method (bringing) the 'science-fiction' drugs in line with 'real-world' drugs." A revised version of the game was resubmitted to the OFLC and reclassified as MA 15+ on 7 August 2008 after drug names were changed. It was later clarified that the only change done to the final version of the game was the name "morphine" changed to "Med-x". This change was done to all versions worldwide; thus, Australia got the same version of the game as other countries uncut with an MA 15+.
- Atelier Totori Plus: The Adventurer of Arland was given an R 18+ rating on PlayStation Vita, a huge jump from the PS3 version's PG rating, with the reason being "references to sexual violence". Comparatively, in North America, the game received a T for Teen (ages 13+) rating, a 12+ rating in Japan (CERO B), and a PEGI 12 rating. Its strict rating resulted in the creation of an internet meme captioned "High Impact Violence" that satirizes the Classification Board for labeling mildly sensual animation as having "high impact".

==== Adult (18+) ratings for video games ====
Many games were banned before 2011 on the basis that the R 18+ rating did not apply to video games at the time. This was the subject of complaint in the gaming community, who argued that there is no reason why adults should be prevented from seeing content in games that they could see in a film. One of the main opponents to the introduction of an R 18+ rating for video games was the former South Australian Attorney-General, Michael Atkinson, who vetoed every attempt to include one.

On 11 August 2010, at a public forum, opposition leader Tony Abbott was asked a question about his views on the absence of an R 18+ rating for video games and whether he had any policies relating to the subject, saying, "if what happens with video games is not roughly analogous to what happens in other areas, that seems silly ... Instinctively I'm with you, and it's something I'd be happy to look at, if we are in Government." In December 2010, Attorney General Robert McClelland appeared to be moving on this issue following the release of telephone poll results conducted by the Minister for Home Affairs Brendan O'Connor, showing roughly 80% in support of an R 18+ classification.

On 22 July 2011, at a meeting of state and territories' attorneys general, an agreement was reached for the introduction of an R 18+ classification. It was planned to introduce the rating towards the end of 2011. On 22 July 2011, a meeting of attorneys-general produced an in-principle agreement to introduce the R 18+ classification for video games; however, NSW Attorney-General Greg Smith abstained from the vote. The Home Affairs Minister, Brendan O'Connor, said the federal government would over-ride NSW and implement the R 18+ rating regardless of its decision and would be officially available before the end of 2011. On 10 August the NSW Attorney General agreed on the R 18+; thus, the rating would be accepted and available to all states before the end of 2011.

As of 1 January 2013, the R 18+ rating has been officially implemented for video games although it is apparently not being used to full effect as many games are still being refused classification.

The first game to be released with an R 18+ rating was Ninja Gaiden Sigma 2 Plus. The game Saints Row IV became the first game to be refused classification under the new standard on 25 June 2013. State of Decay became the second game to be refused classification less than 24 hours after the first (Saints Row IV) was banned. Both were refused classification on the grounds of "illicit or proscribed drug use related to incentives and rewards".

Video games classified from 22 September 2024 containing "simulated gambling" will now be classified, at minimum, as R 18+.

== See also ==
- Censorship in Australia
- Internet censorship in Australia
- List of pornography laws by region – Australian hardcore pornography laws
- Australian Commercial Television Code of Practice – includes the rating system of Australian TV
- Video game controversy – includes the history of games censorship in Australia
- List of banned video games in Australia
