= Aubergine (disambiguation) =

Aubergine is a British, New Zealand and Irish term for eggplant.

Aubergine may also refer to:

- Aubergine (color)
- Aubergine (London restaurant)
- Aubergine (Netherlands restaurant)

== See also ==
- Eggplant (disambiguation)
