= Eggplant (disambiguation) =

Eggplant (Solanum melongena; also named aubergine or brinjal) is a species of nightshade grown for its edible fruit.

Eggplant may also refer to:

- Eggplant (color), a dark purple or brownish-purple color
- Eggplant Software, an automated software testing company, and its products
- "Eggplant", a song by White Reaper from You Deserve Love
- "Eggplant", a song from the video game 428: Shibuya Scramble
- Eggplant Wizard, a character in the Kid Icarus video games series
- Robert Eggplant (born 1973), American writer, musician, and activist
- Eggplant run, a challenge playthrough of the video game Spelunky centering on an eggplant

== See also ==
- List of eggplant dishes
