= Eirik Suhrke =

Norwegian indie composer

Eirik Surhke
- Suhrke (far left) at the 2012 Game Developers Choice Awards
- Occupations: Composer; sound designer; game developer
- Years active: 2006 - present

Eirik Suhrke is a Norwegian freelance composer and video game designer known for his video game soundtracks and original chiptune music under the alias of Phlogiston. He has composed for Spelunky, Hotline Miami, and Vlambeer games including Ridiculous Fishing and Super Crate Box. He has also directed and designed games, being one of the main contributors to UFO 50, Mossmouth's 2024 retro-styled game collection.

He is a long-time collaborator of video game studio Nitrome as well as the independent developers Derek Yu and Ojiro Fumoto.

== Early life ==
Suhrke grew up in Oslo, Norway. He started playing the bass guitar at age five and started making VGM inspired music in 2000. He credits Nobuo Uematsu as an early influence.

== Career ==
Suhrke was educated as a sound engineer and taught himself music composition. He primarily works on video games in music and sound design. His compositions for games first began as a hobby in his early teens, for RPG Maker indie games and other projects he found on online forums. He started making and releasing chiptune music under the alias of Phlogistan. In 2006, he co-founded the netlabel PAUSE (stylized as II) together with chiptune musician and videogame composer Disasterpeace.

Suhrke composed the music and sound on the Xbox Live Arcade version of Spelunky which released in 2012. The mid-tempo jazz album was inspired by early 1990s video games and was composed over two years using a 1986 synthesizer, audio software from the early 1990s, and live instrumentation. He also worked on Vlambeer's Ridiculous Fishing and Super Crate Box, and composed a track for Hotline Miami.

In 2015 Suhrke was approached by Ojiro Fumoto to compose the soundtrack for Downwell. According to Suhrke, Fumoto initially requested the score to sound "bright and motivating" and to take inspiration from Mega Man 2. The soundtrack was later released on vinyl.

Suhrke is one of the collaborators on UFO 50, an anthology of retro-style games. He is the sole composer and sound designer of the collection. In addition, he also helped design the games Barbuta, Mooncat, (Note: Expanded version of Suhrke's entry for Ludum Dare 34, ...and the mooncats (2015).) The Big Bell Race, Warptank, Onion Delivery, Caramel Caramel, Divers, Pingolf, Rakshasa, Elfazar's Hat and the Campanella trilogy.

== Critical reception ==
Earnest Cavalli of Engadget described Suhrke's work as among "the finest indie gaming soundtracks in recent memory" in 2013.

== Ludography ==
Year	Title	Publisher	Composer	Sound Designer	Game Designer	Notes	Ref(s)
2006	Mr. Blocko	Perfect Run	Yes	No	No		
2010	Warlock Bentspine	Lazrool	Yes	No	No		
2010	Super Crate Box	Vlambeer	Yes	No	No		
2012	Spelunky	Mossmouth	Yes	Yes	No	Xbox Live Arcade version	
2015	Downwell	Devolver Digital	Yes	Yes	No		
2015	Gunbrick	Nitrome	Yes	No	No	Mobile version	
2020	Spelunky 2	Mossmouth	Yes	Yes	No		
2024	UFO 50	Mossmouth	Yes	Yes	Yes		

== Discography ==
Includes work released under the aliases of Phlogiston (†) and Pajjama (‡) as well as Suhrke's full name.

Year	Title	Label	Notes	Ref(s)
2007	Mode: 3 †	8bitpeoples	EP	
2007	Croqel †	Pause		
2009	Nectar †	Pause		
2009	Game music 1 †	Pause		
2010	Warlock Bentspine †	Pause	Video game soundtrack	
2010	Super Crate Box †	Pause	Video game soundtrack	
2011	Geif †	Pause		
2012	Super Crate Box Special †	Pause		
2012	Spelunky	Pause	Video game soundtrack	
2012	Starch ‡	Self-released (digital) Orange Milk Records (tape)		
2013	Jane Papaya ‡	Self-released (digital)		
2013	Ridiculous Fishing	Pause	Video game soundtrack	
2013	Game music 2	Self-released (digital)		
2014	Game music 3	Self-released (digital)		
2014	Karakasa ‡	Self-released (digital)		
2014	Friends in caves	Self-released (digital)		
2015	Gunbrick	Self-released (digital)	Video game soundtrack	
2015	Downwell	Self-released (digital) Black Screen Records (vinyl)	Video game soundtrack	
2016	skopulac	Self-release (digital)	Video game soundtrack	
2017	womb ‡	Self-released (digital)		
2020	Spelunky 2	Self-released	Video game soundtrack	
2024	UFO 50	Self-released (digital)	Video game soundtrack	
2024	Miasma Tower	Self-released (digital)	Video game soundtrack	
