= Devolver Bootleg =

Demake of a videogame compilation

- Developer: Doinksoft
- Publisher: Devolver Digital
- Platform: Microsoft Windows
- Release: 10 June 2019
- Genre: Various
- Mode: Single-player

Devolver Bootleg is a video game compilation of video game demakes based on real Devolver Digital games. It was developed by studio Doinksoft and published by Devolver Digital. Devolver Bootleg was announced during Devolver Digital's press conference at E3 2019 and released on 10 June 2019.

== List of games ==
The compilation includes eight titles, which are parodies of video games published by Devolver Digital.

| Original | Demake |
|---|---|
| Enter the Gungeon | Enter The Gun Dungeon |
| Hotline Miami | Hotline Milwaukee |
| Ape Out | Ape Out Jr. |
| Downwell | Shootyboots |
| Absolver | Super Absolver Mini: Turbo Fighting Championship |
| Gato Roboto | Catsylvania |
| Pikuniku | PikuBiku Ball Stars |
| Luftrausers | Luftrousers |

== Reception ==
Devolver Bootleg has garnered a 69 out of a 100, with "mixed or average reviews", on Metacritic.
