= Neckbreak =

2022 video game

- Developers: MGP Studios; Solid9 Studios
- Publisher: RedDeer.Games
- Platforms: Windows; Xbox Series X/S; Nintendo Switch
- Release: Windows: WW: December 1, 2022; Xbox Series X and S: WW: February 2, 2024; Nintendo Switch: WW: February 2, 2024
- Genre: First-person shooter
- Mode: Single-player

Neckbreak (originally released under the name Project Downfall) is a cyberpunk 2022 first-person shooter video game developed by MGP Studios and Solid9 Studios. It was published by RedDeer.Games and released for Nintendo Switch and Xbox consoles in February 2024.

== Gameplay ==
Neckbreak is a first-person shooter set in a dystopian cyberpunk world. It features fast-paced battles centered on utilizing slow-motion mechanics to chain kills while swapping weapons and using environmental objects/hazards to clear areas. The levels also feature some puzzles and additional interactable objects. The game features 12 different endings, depending on how the player progresses through the game and the choices they make.

== Development ==
A free demo was released on Steam in June 2020. The game had been playable in early access for over a year prior to the demo release.

Some publications have compared the title stylistically to Hotline Miami. Citing their shared reflex-based gameplay, ultra-violence, and color schemes. The Switch release featured a redesigned lighting system from other versions.

== Release and reception ==
Reception

Aggregate score
Aggregator	Score
Metacritic	(Nintendo Switch) 53/100

The game was originally available under the title Project Downfall in beta, its Steam demo, and on console release in 2022. The name was later changed to Neckbreak and relisted as such.

Neckbreak received mixed or average reviews according to Metacritic. In a negative review, publication Finger Guns awarded the title a 3/10, calling the shooting gameplay "clunky and contradictive". In another review, publication Big Boss Battle called the game an "excellent movement shooter", while placing some criticism on the game's difficulty spikes.
