= Bananasaurus Rex =

Canadian streamer and speedrunner

- Born: Aaron James Loder; September 4, 1991 (age 34); Stephenville, Newfoundland
- Occupations: Livestreamer, Speedrunner
- Website: www.b-rex.tv

Aaron James Loder, professionally known as Bananasaurus Rex, is a Canadian Twitch streamer and a video game speedrunner.

Loder was the first to successfully perform a solo eggplant run in Derek Yu's roguelike platformer Spelunky. An eggplant run is a luck-based and challenging endeavor originally meant for co-op play only. It was thought impossible to do solo.

Loder started his speedrunning career with Portal 2. He was able to simultaneously hold world records for 48 of the 51 levels at once. Since summer 2013, Loder has been streaming regularly on Twitch. At first, he mainly streamed speedruns of Spelunky, though after building up a large enough fan base to obtain a Twitch partnership, he was able to quit his main job and continue livestreaming on a full-time basis. He found his niche as a variety streamer, streaming a wide range of games ranging from indie to triple A.

Besides Portal 2, Loder has also done speedruns of Dustforce, Paranautical Activity, Risk of Rain, Spelunky, Dark Souls II, 1001 Spikes and Wings of Vi. He has held speedrunning world records in all of these games.

In September 2015, he became the first person to beat PangaeaPanga's Super Mario Maker level "Bomb Voyage", succeeding after a collective effort of over 11,000 failed attempts.
