= Eggplant run =

Video game challenge

A cropped screenshot of Bananasaurus Rex's eggplant run, showing the eggplant lying on Kali's altar

An eggplant run is a challenge playthrough of the 2012 roguelike-like platform video game Spelunky HD. Such a playthrough centers on carrying an eggplant item to the final boss of the game, King Yama, and tossing it into his face. This eggplant item was originally added to Spelunky as part of an easter egg pitched by the game's composer Eirik Suhrke, and Spelunky's lead designer Derek Yu decided to give it the additional function of turning King Yama into an inert eggplant monster.

Though carrying out a full eggplant run in Spelunky's cooperative mode is fairly manageable, it is significantly harder to do a single-player eggplant run. Such a playthrough was first achieved by Twitch video game live streamer Bananasaurus Rex in November 2013, a month after Spelunky HD's PC release. This run was widely reported upon and described by Polygon as "an important, downright historic achievement". Derek Yu went on to legitimize one of the exploits necessary to carry out such a solo eggplant run.

== Background ==
Early on during development for Spelunky HD for Xbox 360, Eirik Suhrke was inspired by "Totaka's Song", a hidden music track Nintendo composer Kazumi Totaka inserted in many of the video games he had worked on. Suhrke wanted to hide his own "Eirik's Song" in Spelunky and pitched the idea to Derek Yu. In his book about the game, Yu wrote that the idea of a secret music track "seemed like a no-brainer for a game ... laden with secrets and references", but with other aspects of the game pressing, the idea was put on hold until a short time before the game's official release. Various ideas to access Suhrke's secret music track were considered and the team quickly settled on making the track play when a player places a "mystery box" item on a sacrificial altar dedicated to the goddess Kali. This was considered fairly obscure, as a player would usually open a mystery box immediately in order to reveal what is inside.

Discussing what a player may get in return for sacrificing a mystery box in this way, Yu suggested an eggplant, as this fruit holds a "small but significant place" in video game history, having appeared in games such as Sam & Max Hit the Road, Ice Climber, Wrecking Crew, and Adventure Island. In his book, Yu wrote that he had always had an admiration for the type of absurdity video games can include without criticism, such as how Toru Osawa placed an Eggplant Wizard in the Greek mythological setting of Kid Icarus. Suhrke wanted the discovery of "Eirik's Song" to have no additional purpose, but Yu predicted that players would try to do something with the eggplant and decided to implement a purpose for it. The sprite sheet that carried the graphics for a few larger monsters in game still featured a blank area, and Yu quickly painted a five-frame animation of King Yama's face as a big, blinking eggplant. Yu added a few lines of code and superficially tested the behavior before moving on to other work he still had to do.

The eggplant was first documented in October 2012, three months after Spelunky HD was released on the Xbox Live Arcade, and resulted in a large amount of speculation among the Spelunky community as to what purpose the eggplant may serve. It was not until the game's PC release in August 2013 that players were able to look into the game's data files and discover the sprites of King Yama's eggplant face. Using a cheat engine, YouTuber chaindead brought the eggplant to the final boss and demonstrated what happens when the item collides with King Yama's head. Several weeks later, a full "eggplant run" of Spelunky was completed in the game's cooperative mode. In this mode, mystery boxes are more abundant, and one player can hold on to the eggplant while the other advances through the levels. It was still unknown if an eggplant run would be possible in the game's single-player mode.

== Execution ==
An eggplant run is very difficult to accomplish in a single-player game. In order to get an eggplant in single-player mode, one needs to get a random seed in which a mystery box and one of Kali's sacrificial altars appear in the same level. Subsequently, the player needs to carry the fragile eggplant through each of the game's levels while simultaneously executing a sequence of actions that allows the player character to access the "hell" world of the game, where King Yama can be found. One of these actions is to kill the player character in the third world of the game so he resurrects inside of an otherwise indestructible Moai. However, a player loses whatever item they are holding in their hands while doing this, making it impossible to resurrect oneself with the eggplant. In late September, Spelunky streamers BaerTaffy and bisnap discovered a glitch that allows a player to destroy the blocks of which the Moai consists. To do this, the player needs a ball and chain, an item forced upon the player as a punishment after two of Kali's altars are destroyed in a run. The ball and chain is heavy and slows the player's movement considerably, but its weight allows it to smash through blocks that it falls on from a height, including, via an oversight, the normally indestructible Moai blocks. By exploiting this glitch, a player can take any item through the Moai, including the eggplant.

In order to reach Yama, a player needs to carry a sceptre from level 4–1 to level 4–2. As it is impossible to carry two items simultaneously, a player needs to bring a non-player character to these levels in order to carry the sceptre for them. However, such AI-controlled characters are difficult to manipulate and are prone to accidentally kill themselves in the game's hazardous levels, adding to the difficulty of solo eggplant runs.

On November 10, 2013, Spelunky speedrunner and live streamer Bananasaurus Rex executed the first known successful solo eggplant run. This playthrough took him 76 minutes and 41 seconds of in-game time to complete and he did so with only one health point remaining. As of 2020, Spelunky speedrun aggregator MossRanking has listed videos of successful solo eggplant runs by over 60 players, some of which impose combinations of additional restrictions (such as Maximum, No Gold, Pacifist, and Low%).

== Legacy ==
Graham Smith of Rock, Paper, Shotgun reported on Bananasaurus Rex's solo eggplant run, appreciating the existence of "video game myths" and the positive effect they have on video game communities. Smith stated that "the eggplant video feels like a full stop on something," and said that he "can't help but feel a little bit melancholic about that." Eurogamer described the solo eggplant run as a "remarkable goal" and a "colossal feat", saying that watching Rex's "increasingly stressed mental state" resulted in a harrowing viewing experience. PC Gamer described this run as "an hour and 22 minutes of near misses, improbable saves, unbearable tension".

Douglas Wilson, writing for Polygon, described the first successful solo eggplant run as "an important, downright historic achievement," calling it "2013's most fascinating video game moment". According to Wilson, the first solo eggplant run was an example of how video game live streaming was changing video game culture, as Bananasaurus Rex's run was "indebted" to the live streaming community that gave players such as BaerTaffy and Rex "a reason to keep exploring, and an audience to play for." Wilson further emphasized the value of secrets in video games, quoting BaerTaffy saying that "the group of us rallying around this one big secret ending is one of the best things that can happen for a gaming community." Lastly, Wilson suggested that the Spelunky community "[beat] Derek Yu and [programmer] Andy Hull at their own game", subverting the designer's intentions by completing a run that was not intended to be possible.

In an interview with GiantBomb in 2014, Derek Yu confirmed that the Moai being breakable by the ball and chain was indeed a glitch. Yu said that "it just so happened that the way we designed it, it was still possible to break it in this one way we didn't think of, ... but once people did break it and they're doing these really cool things with it ... then I think we're happy to just leave it in or tweak it a little bit to make it seem more official after the fact." The team legitimized this exploit by changing the Moai sprite so it actually looks broken when it is destroyed.
