= Ojiro Fumoto =

Japanese video game designer (born 1990)

- 麓 旺二郎
- Born: 1990 (age 35–36)
- Education: Tokyo University of the Arts
- Notable work: Downwell; Poinpy; UFO 50: Seaside Drive

Ojiro Fumoto (Japanese: 麓 旺二郎, Hepburn: Fumoto Ōjiro; born 1990), known professionally under his pseudonym Moppin, is a Japanese video game designer. He is best known for his work in the indie game space, developing the games Downwell and Poinpy, as well as his contributions to UFO 50.

== Career ==
Fumoto had graduated in opera singing at the Tokyo University of the Arts in 2014. However, after reading about Rami Ismail's "game-a-week" article on Gamasutra, Fumoto canceled his studies in order to further pursue game development. After completing his thirteenth project, Fumoto decided to flesh out the idea further, eventually turning into Downwell. The game was released in 2015 by Devolver Digital to critical acclaim, and received many awards such as Destructoid's best Mobile Game of 2015 award.

Fumoto announced in January 2018 that he had started working for Nintendo, saying "I'll do my best". It is believed that his success with Downwell was a large factor in his hiring. Fumoto previously stated that "[i]t was super fun developing games as indie" and that he "[could not] wait to see what it's like to develop games as part of a bigger team." At the beginning of 2019, Fumoto announced he had quit his job at Nintendo and returned to indie development.

His next game and collaboration with Devolver Digital, Poinpy, was designed partly in response to the reception of Downwell. It was released in 2022 to positive reviews. Sometime between 2017 and 2024, Fumoto also contributed development work to the mass game compilation UFO 50. He spent a half-year on the development team, directing Seaside Drive and working on various other games. UFO 50 released September 18, 2024 to critical acclaim.

== Works ==
Date	Title	Role	Notes
2015	Downwell	Director	
2019	Ring Fit Adventure	Minigame design	
2020	Spelunky 2	Voice talent	
2022	Poinpy	Director	
2024	UFO 50	Director of Seaside Drive, Co-director of Campanella	Various additional development
