= Midnight Animal =

Cancelled video game mod

- The mod's Steam page banner after being renamed
- Developer: Spencer Yan
- Publishers: Devolver Digital, Dennaton Games (planned)
- Release: Abandoned

Midnight Animal (officially known later in development as Midnight Animal: a Story of Love and Forgetting in Four Parts) was a planned fan-made standalone mod for the top-down shooter game Hotline Miami being developed by Spencer Yan. It would have taken place thirty years after the events of Hotline Miami 2: Wrong Number. During development, Yan was granted special permission from Dennaton Games to use the source code of the original games. Following a shift in the games direction, the game as well as Yan were met with severe backlash from several different communities over the alleged tracing of artwork. The mod was de facto cancelled by 2019. In August 2023, the source code of the project was published by Yan on GitHub.

== Gameplay ==
Midnight Animal was going to play similarly to that of Hotline Miami, a top-down shooter game in which the player traverses numerous levels and is tasked with killing all enemies inside. Midnight Animal would have expanded upon these concepts, introducing up to sixty new weapons available for the player to use, as well as redesigned mechanics meant to maximize player combat. Among the new weapons set to be introduced were those related to the environment of a level, ranging from bricks in piles of debris to hardware tools in utility closets. The mod was also set to introduce more interactive elements to levels as well as new masks, a feature in Hotline Miami that alters player behavior and changes the way levels play based on the mask chosen.

Midnight Animal would have taken place thirty years after the events of Hotline Miami 2: Wrong Number, set in a post-apocalyptic United States ran by the conspiracy group 50 Blessings. Unlike Hotline Miami 2, Midnight Animal was set to tell its story from the perspective of a single character. The game was additionally planned to use more dialogue than the original games combined, though in the same amount of levels.

== Development ==
Midnight Animal was being developed by Spencer Yan. The games creator was given special permission from Dennaton Games to use the source code of the original games and offered to publish the result on Steam, on the condition that the game was free and the source code remained secret. Additions to the game engine not featured in the original games included a dynamic lighting engine. The game was also planned to feature new, unique music from the composers featured in the original games. The mod was first revealed in September 2015 via a trailer, and the game was posted onto Steam Greenlight. The game had a planned release date of 18 August 2016. Yan and publications such as PCGamesN referred to the game as an unofficial "Hotline Miami 3".

A screenshot of Midnight Animal. from when it had the subtitle a Story of Love and Forgetting in Four Parts. The anime-styled artwork in use here generated controversy amongst the community.

In June 2016, the mod was delayed indefinitely, with Yan citing health problems as the reason in a now deleted Steam Community post. The mod was abandoned for five months by the creator, and during this time, Yan would become heavily inspired by the Persona series and began to incorporate it into Midnight Animal, renaming the project to Midnight Animal: a Story of Love and Forgetting in Four Parts and continuing development of the mod. In February 2017, Yan first revealed a Story of Love and Forgetting to the community, which was met with fierce backlash. For the next few months, Yan was met with harsh criticism regarding the mods new anime-styled character portraits, with the criticism escalating as far as death threats and usage of slurs. These threats were noted to begin taking a toll on Yan's mental health.

Eventually, the games updated visuals were spread around 4chan, where some members of the Persona community joined in on attacking Yan and accused him of tracing assets from Persona 5. Some users of 4chan joined in on the attacking as well, with some of it degrading into racism and antisemitism, in which Yan retaliated with similar remarks. Eventually, the mod was abandoned and de-facto cancelled by Yan by 2019, with the remaining work being split into different projects. Following the cancellation of Midnight Animal, Yan moved on from the community and apologized for his comments. He has labelled Midnight Animal as an "unmentionable failure", and that the aftermath made him "feel like a fucking failure". While Yan continued to engage on message boards and began work on a new project, the Steam page for the mod was taken down. In August 2023, the source code for the abandoned mod was released by Yan.
