= Poinpy =

2022 video game

- Developer: Moppin
- Publisher: Devolver Digital
- Designer: Ojiro Fumoto
- Artist: Error403
- Composer: Calum Bowen
- Platforms: iOS, Android
- Release: June 10, 2022
- Genre: Platform
- Mode: Single-player

Poinpy is a 2022 platform video game developed by Moppin and published by Devolver Digital. It was released on June 10, 2022, on iOS and Android devices, exclusively through Netflix Games. It is the second collaboration between Ojiro Fumoto and Devolver Digital after Downwell. The game received positive reviews from critics upon its release, with praise being given towards the gameplay, mechanics, and visuals.

== Gameplay ==
Poinpy is a vertically scrolling platform video game through procedurally generated environments. Many writers likened the design to an inverse of Downwell, a game previously developed by Fumoto.

Poinpy stars the title character, a green dinosaur, ascending through various environments and collecting fruits in order to feed a hungry blue beast chasing from below. Poinpy is controlled through the use of the touchscreen, where in a similar style to Angry Birds, holding down initiates a jump and allows the player to adjust its trajectory, and releasing it executes the jump. Poinpy will bounce off walls, and can also jump in mid-air. The number of jumps Poinpy is allowed is determined by the number of jump orbs he currently has access to. Each jump expends a jump orb, which can be replenished by landing on an enemy or pot. Landing on the ground resets all of his jump orbs and combo meter.

Various fruits are scattered throughout. These fruits must be collected to produce juice for the blue beast chasing after Poinpy. The fruits that the creature demands are indicated in a thought bubble at the top of the screen, which also indicates the time left to collect them. Upon landing, Poinpy will juice all the collected fruits if the demands are fulfilled, if not, the collected fruits are discarded. The longer Poinpy stays aloft, the more fruits can be collected. Failing to collect all the fruits before the time runs out will cause the creature to spit fire at Poinpy, costing him a heart. Being hit by enemies will also cost Poinpy a heart. The game ends when Poinpy is out of hearts.

There are many level themes present in the game, ranging from jungles to underwater areas. Each theme also contains mechanics to diversify the gameplay and increase upwards momentum. These include elements such as vines which cause Poinpy to automatically ascend upwards and explosive barrels.

To alleviate the difficulty, permanent upgrades can be unlocked, which can enhance Poinpy's abilities. The fruit collected in levels counts towards a ranking system, allowing the player to unlock extra jump orbs, seeds, and power-up slots. Collecting special fruit in the game awards further seeds, which are used to purchase power-ups. These grant Poinpy extra abilities such as attracting fruit or jumping higher.

There are also additional game modes which exist outside the main campaign. These include a puzzle mode, where all fruits must be collected in a limited amount of jumps, and an endless high-score mode, which is unlocked after beating the main campaign.

== Development ==
Poinpy was developed by Ojiro Fumoto, as a part of Netflix's partnership with Devolver Digital. Development was a collaboration between Fumoto and Error403 (a Japanese illustrator). Fumoto handled the game design and programming, and Error403 created the artwork and animations. The design of Poinpy was in a part a response to Fumoto's previous game, Downwell. Fumoto believed that the high level of difficulty in Downwell blocked off many players from discovering the combo mechanic that he found most fun, so Poinpy was developed to be more accessible in terms of difficulty and controls. Despite this, when game designer Derek Yu beat the entire game in a weekend, it caused concern over the game being too easy.

The soundtrack was composed by Calum Bowen.

Poinpy left Netflix Games on June 10, 2025.

On July 22, 2026, Poinpy was back added to the Google Play Store and App Store, and a Netflix account is no longer required to play.

== Reception ==
Reception

Aggregate score
Aggregator	Score
Metacritic	87/100

Review scores
Publication	Score
Edge	9/10
GameSpot	8/10
Pocket Gamer	4.5/5 stars
TouchArcade	5/5 stars

Poinpy was positively received by critics, scoring 87/100 on reviews aggregation website Metacritic based on 7 reviews. Shaun Musgrave's review on TouchArcade called the game "compelling and challenging, simple to pick up but with satisfying depth" and made many comparisons to Downwell. Ana Diaz of Polygon described the game as "delirious and smooth as hell." and that "Despite being free...Poinpy is as compelling as some of the best paid mobile games out there." GameSpot's Kyle Hilliard rated the game highly, but criticized the soundtrack for being "more annoying than charming" and for the lack of a high score system.

Edge described the game as a "high-wire act combined with a game of billiards, one where you can take your next shot while the ball’s still moving" in a glowing review. They would later declare Poinpy its Mobile Game of the Year, and 7th best game overall in its 2022 Edge Awards issue. Here they would write that the game had "all the hallmarks of classic Nintendo", Fumoto's previous employer, yet it far surpassed all the released Nintendo mobile games to date. The game was also nominated for Mobile Game of the Year at the 26th Annual D.I.C.E. Awards, losing out to Marvel Snap.
