= Downwell (video game) =

2015 video game

- Developers: Moppin; Red Phantom Games (PS4, Switch)
- Publisher: Devolver Digital
- Designer: Ojiro Fumoto
- Programmer: Ojiro Fumoto
- Artist: Ojiro Fumoto
- Composer: Eirik Suhrke
- Engine: GameMaker: Studio
- Platforms: iOS; Windows; Android; PlayStation 4; PlayStation Vita; Switch
- Release: iOS: WW: 14 October 2015; Windows: WW: 15 October 2015; Android: WW: 27 January 2016; PS4, Vita: WW: 24 May 2016; Switch: WW: 31 January 2019
- Genres: Scrolling shooter, platform
- Mode: Single-player

Downwell is a 2015 roguelike vertically scrolling shooter video game developed by Moppin and published by Devolver Digital. The first game to be developed solely by Ojiro Fumoto, it was released for iOS and Microsoft Windows in October 2015, for Android in January 2016, and for PlayStation 4 and PlayStation Vita in May 2016. A Nintendo Switch version was released in January 2019. British studio Red Phantom Games developed the Switch and PlayStation ports.

Downwell uses a palette of four colors, which default to black background and white outlines, with red as a highlight for gems, enemies and other important items, and blue for water environment features. The exact colors can be changed through unlockable in-game palettes. The art style and underground level design have been compared to Spelunky and Cave Story.

== Gameplay ==
Downwell's protagonist Welltaro shooting a stomping-resistant snail enemy with the "burst" ammo upgrade

In Downwell, players control a "curious man" named Welltaro, who is at the local park one night when he decides to explore the depths of the well nearby. Knowing that monsters are waiting for him inside, he straps on his gunboots and starts his trip downwards, killing his enemies to proceed and collect treasure. The game has three basic controls: left and right movement, and the ability to jump while on a solid surface. When mid-air, pressing and holding the jump button fires from Welltaro's gunboots.

The well is procedurally generated, and the player is often confronted with a large number of different types of enemies, most of which can either be shot with the gunboots or stomped by jumping on them; others, however, are resistant to being stomped and can thus only be killed with bullets. While normal enemies only feature a red glare alongside the white outlines, these particular enemies are completely highlighted in red, with a more filled sprite body. The gunboots are automatically reloaded when Welltaro hits a surface, regardless of whether or not it is solid. During the descent, players will find "timevoids", which, upon entering, stop everything outside them, as well as the music. These timevoids may lead to caves, which provide the player with a large amount of gems, or with an alternate weapon, which influences speed, delay, ammo usage, ammo count and the shoot pattern of the gunboots, as well as providing either health or a max ammo upgrade. In other cases, the timevoids lead to a shop, where Welltaro is welcomed by a Jizō which takes the place of a shopkeeper, offering the player three different items in exchange for gems.

The well is built up from multiple stages, each of them having three levels and featuring different sets of environmental designs and enemies. At the end of each level, the player is given the choice between three Welltaro upgrades, which persist throughout the play session and support the player, in addition to ammo upgrades or shop purchases. Additionally, alternating with color palettes unlocks, the player unlocks different movement styles, which influence Welltaro's position and movement animation while on solid ground, as well as some of the well's procedural attributes, like frequency and type of timevoids.

== Development ==
Downwell's development began around March 2014. At that time, Fumoto had graduated in opera singing at the Tokyo University of the Arts, but felt "ridiculous" singing for others. At the end of February 2014, Fumoto canceled his studies and went on to make multiple "game-a-week" projects, after he read about that idea in Rami Ismail's article on Gamasutra. Downwell was Fumoto's thirteenth project, in which he instantly saw a high potential and decided to continue its development. Much of the game was influenced by Fumoto's obsession with Spelunky, and the initial idea for the game came from him wondering what a mobile phone game with similar gameplay would be like. In early development the gameplay was that of a standard platform game, however once Fumoto came up with the Gunshoe mechanic he rebuilt the game around it. During early development, the game was titled Fall or Well, however, during an indie meet-up in Tokyo, Japan, Fumoto figured that he needed an actual name for his game, and therefore came up with Downwell, and stuck with it. While the game was not very popular at the time, Fumoto started posting animated GIF images of Downwell's gameplay in early development stages on his Japanese Twitter account, which came to the attention of Cara Ellison from The Guardian, as the game was largely different from Japan's usual indie gaming market. On the same day of the article being published, indie publisher Devolver Digital hooked up with Fumoto through a comment on one of his GIF images, which showed the player shooting monsters and crates together with the "drone" upgrade, which repeats the actions the player takes. This comment and the following dialog then led to Devolver Digital becoming Downwell's publisher. With constant support from Devolver Digital and Fumoto's continuous posting of GIF images led to the opening of the game's official website and the announcement for the late 2015 release on iOS and Microsoft Windows.

The game was shown at gaming conventions, one of which was the Independent Games Festival 2015, which was held from 2 March 2015 to 6 March 2015, at which Downwell got to the finalists of the "Student Showcase Award". Another important convention was Japan's largest indie games festival, BitSummit 2015, which was held from 11 July 2015 to 12 July 2015, and at which Downwell was nominated for the Vermillion Gate Award by the Grand Jury and scored second behind La-Mulana 2. The game was finally announced for a release on 15 October 2015 and was released for iOS and Microsoft Windows, while Moppin continued working on the Android version. On 12 November 2015, Downwell was nominated for "Best Mobile/Handheld Game" for The Game Awards 2015, which took place on 3 December 2015. On 11 December 2015, publisher Devolver Digital teased Downwell for future release on PlayStation Vita by sharing a picture showing the game running on a PlayStation Vita device with tate mode enabled. On 26 January 2016, it was announced that Downwell would be released the following day, respectively, 27 January 2016. On 9 February 2016, an official video by Sony Computer Entertainment revealed that the game would be released for PlayStation 4 and PlayStation Vita sometime in 2016. In September 2018, during that month's Nintendo Direct show, it was announced that Red Phantom Games was developing a port of Downwell for the Nintendo Switch. Fumoto's next game, Poinpy, was designed partly in response to the reception of Downwell.

== Reception ==
Reception

Aggregate score
Aggregator	Score
Metacritic	iOS: 91/100; PC: 81/100; PS4: 80/100; VITA: 85/100; NS: 88/100

Review scores
Publication	Score
Destructoid	10/10
Gamezebo	5/5
PC Games (DE)	70%
TouchArcade	5/5

Upon release, Downwell received critical acclaim. On Metacritic, the game currently holds a score of 81/100 for Microsoft Windows, 91/100 for iOS, 80/100 for PlayStation 4, and 85/100 for PlayStation Vita. Steven Hansen from Destructoid praised the game's design concept and giving it a perfect 10/10 by saying that "[t]hese are the kind of things you learn as you delve deeper and deeper into Downwell's four worlds (three levels each) and they are presented intelligently." Another positive review was written by Nadia Oxford of Gamezebo, who gave the game 5 out of 5 stars and praised Downwell's overall play-style and design, stating that "Downwell is easily one of the best action games to hit mobile this year. It's intense, it's unique, and every game you play goes towards unlocking something new." Peter Bathge from German PC gaming magazine PC Games, however, gave the game a 70% score, criticizing that "[the game] feels somehow weird on the PC. This does not only come from the not always perfect, fixed and predefined controls, but the whole game principle is obviously cut to the mobile market needs."

=== Awards ===
List of awards and nominations
Year	Ceremony	Category	Result	Ref.
2015	Independent Games Festival 2015	Student Showcase Award	Nominated	
2015	BitSummit 2015	Vermillion Gate Award	Nominated	
2015	TouchArcade	Game of the Week — Week 42, 2015	Won	
2015	GameSpot	Game of the Month — October 2015	Nominated	
2015	The Game Awards 2015	Best Mobile/Handheld Game	Nominated	
2015	Pocket Tactics	Action Game of the Year 2015	Won	
2015	Destructoid	Best PC Game of 2015	Nominated	
2015	Destructoid	Best Mobile Game of 2015	Won	
2015	The Jimquisition	Game of the Year 2015	Won	
2016	Game Developers Choice Awards 2016	Best Debut (Moppin)	Nominated	
2016	Game Developers Choice Awards 2016	Best Handheld/Mobile Game	Nominated	
2016	2016 SXSW Gaming Awards	Mobile Game of the Year	Nominated	
