= Aubergine (Netherlands restaurant) =

Coordinates: 51°19′53.29″N 6°7′12.77″E

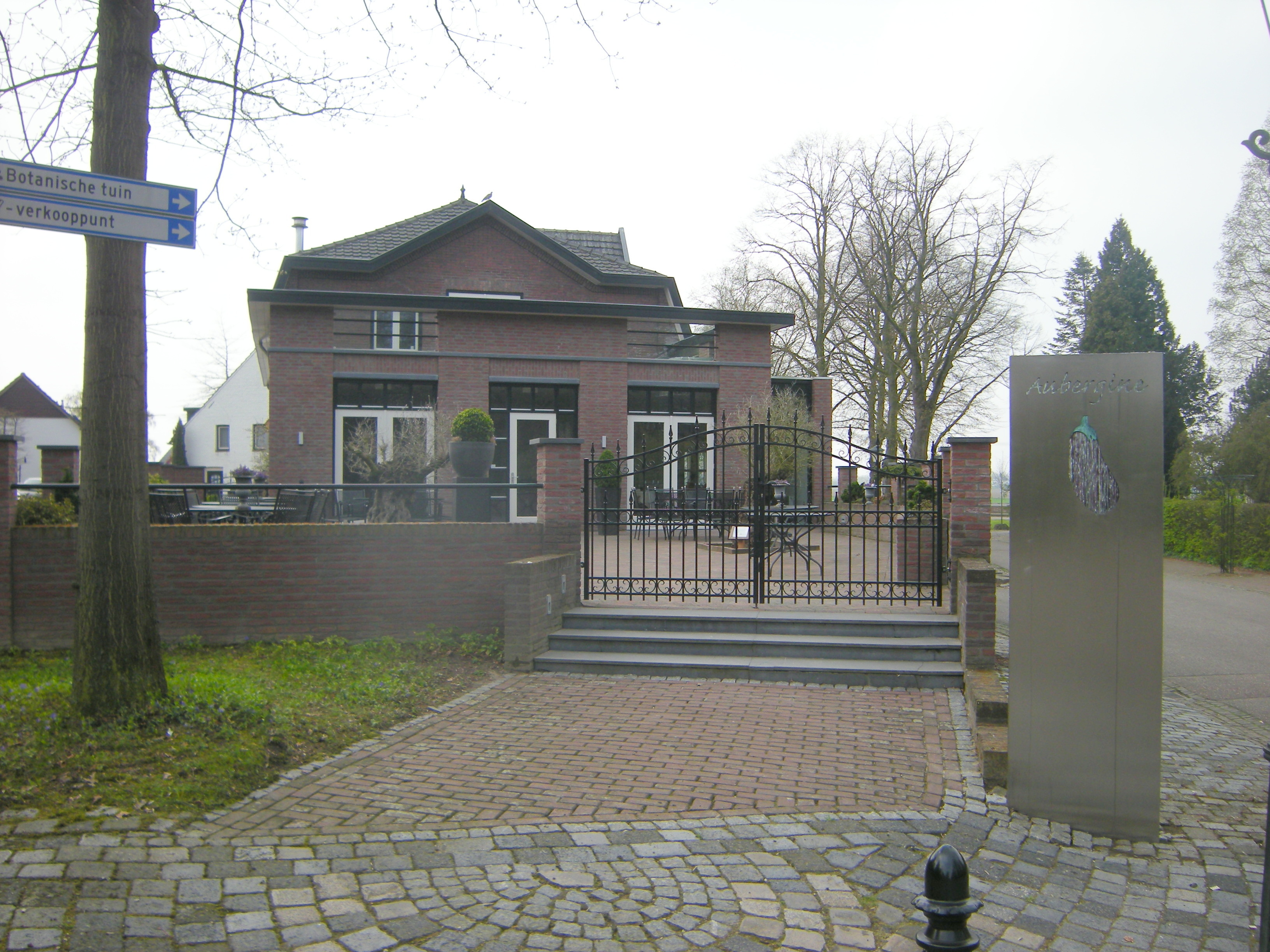
- Interactive map of Aubergine

Restaurant information
- Established: 1998
- Head chef: Paul Pollux
- Food type: French, International, Regional
- Location: Maashoek 2a, Steyl, 5953 BJ, Netherlands
- Seating capacity: 50
- Website: Official website

Aubergine is a restaurant in Steyl in the Netherlands. It is a fine dining restaurant that is awarded one Michelin star in the period 2006–2018.

GaultMillau awarded the restaurant 14 out of 20 points.

Head chef of Aubergine is Paul Pollux.

== See also ==
- List of Michelin starred restaurants in the Netherlands
