= Eggplant (color) =

Dark purple or brownish-purple color

Color coordinates
- Hex triplet: #614051
- sRGB^{B} (r, g, b): (97, 64, 81)
- HSV (h, s, v): (329°, 34%, 38%)
- CIELCh_{uv} (L, C, h): (31, 20, 337°)
- Source: Crayola
- ISCC–NBS descriptor: Dark purplish red
- B: Normalized to [0–255] (byte)

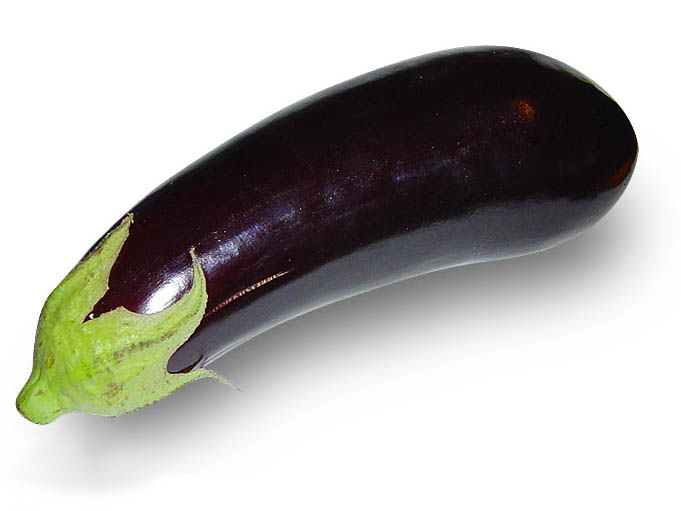
A European eggplant (aubergine)

Eggplant is a dark purple or brownish-purple color that resembles the color of the outer skin of European eggplants. Another name for the color eggplant is aubergine (the French, German and British English word for eggplant).

The first recorded use of eggplant as a color name in English was in 1915.

The pinkish-purple-grayish color shown in the color box as eggplant was introduced by Crayola in 1998.

Eggplant vegetables themselves have many different varieties and may range from indigo to white, but they can also be red or black and other colors. The term eggplant originated as a description of the round, white colored eggplants because they look like eggs. However, this origin became mostly forgotten to the common Western collective as the importation of white eggplants ceded to the purple, leading to the word "eggplant" being associated with purple. In Western cuisines, an exceeding majority of the eggplants eaten are purple. Chinese eggplants are the same shape as a European eggplant but are colored a dark violet color. Thai eggplants are small, round, and colored forest green.
