= Hotline Miami =

2012 video game

- Cover art by Niklas Åkerblad
- Developer: Dennaton Games (Note: Abstraction Games developed the console ports.)
- Publisher: Devolver Digital
- Programmer: Jonatan Söderström
- Artist: Dennis Wedin
- Engine: GameMaker
- Platforms: Windows: OS X; PlayStation 3; PlayStation Vita; Linux; PlayStation 4; Nintendo Switch; Xbox One; Stadia; PlayStation 5; Xbox Series X/S
- Release: 23 October 2012: Windows; WW: 23 October 2012; OS X; WW: 18 March 2013; PS3, Vita; NA: 25 June 2013; EU: 26 June 2013; Linux; WW: 9 September 2013; PS4; NA: 19 August 2014; Switch; WW: 19 August 2019; Xbox One; WW: 7 April 2020; Stadia; WW: 22 September 2020; PS5, Xbox Series X/S; WW: 23 October 2023
- Genre: Top-down shooter
- Mode: Single-player

Hotline Miami is a 2012 top-down shooter game developed by Dennaton Games and published by Devolver Digital. Set in Miami in 1989, the game follows an unnamed silent protagonist—dubbed Jacket by fans—as he commits massacres against the local Russian mafia. In each level, the player must defeat every enemy through any means necessary, with wearable animal masks giving the player unique abilities. The plot follows Jacket as he slowly loses his grip on reality and is interrogated for his killings; the game advocates a pacifist message by making the player feel regret for their in-game actions.

The game was developed over the course of nine months as the first commercial release of Dennaton Games, a duo composed of developers Jonatan Söderström and Dennis Wedin. Söderström programmed the game and wrote the narrative, while Wedin designed the graphics. The game's soundtrack features several artists and a variety of music genres, including electronic, techno, vaporwave, and synthwave. Hotline Miami was released in October 2012 for Windows, followed by versions for OS X, Linux, PlayStation 3, and PlayStation Vita in 2013, and a PlayStation 4 port in 2014.

Hotline Miami has been frequently considered one of the greatest video games, as well as one of the most influential indie games. Initial reviews highlighted its gameplay, soundtrack, and atmosphere, though some criticized its controls. The themes and storytelling were also praised. It was nominated for several awards and sold 1.5 million copies by May 2015. The game inspired multiple developers and contributed to a rise in indie game releases throughout the 2010s; it also contributed to the success of its publisher and the popularity of the synthwave music genre. A sequel, Hotline Miami 2: Wrong Number, was released in March 2015. The series went on to spawn a franchise, with two compilations of both games on platforms such as the Nintendo Switch, a comic book spinoff, and several fan games.

== Gameplay ==
A screenshot of the player engaging in a standoff with the Russian Mafia. The points are visible on the top right of the image.

Hotline Miami is a top-down shooter game. It is set in Miami during the late 1980s, and is divided into nineteen "chapters". At the beginning of each chapter, the player character "Jacket" (Note: Jacket is a fan-assigned name to an otherwise unnamed protagonist. It was later adopted by Dennaton.) receives a message on his answering machine, instructing him to travel to a different part of Miami and kill all enemies at that location. The player is able to defeat their opponents through a variety of melee and ranged weapons, like crowbars and firearms. The player can also knock out enemies with a door, use them as human shields, or kick them against a wall. If an enemy is not immediately killed in an attack, the player can perform a specialized attack to finish them off. Later stages have the player take control of a different character, known as the Biker, who can only use knives.

The player and enemies can both be felled by a single attack each. To compensate, the player is able to quickly restart the current stage after death, allowing them to rethink their strategy. Different types of enemies appear, such as dogs and boss characters. The enemy AI is inconsistent, with reactions to attacks ranging from responding immediately to doing nothing. The player is awarded points for each enemy they kill, with bonus points awarded based on the method of execution or the number of enemies killed in quick succession. The player can lock onto an enemy without having to aim. On the PlayStation Vita, the functions of the mouse, including aiming, are shifted over to the touch screen, with locking onto enemies requiring the player to touch them on-screen.

Before each chapter begins, the player can choose from a variety of animal masks to wear, which grant different abilities. These abilities include faster finishing moves and improved visibility. At the end of each chapter, the player's total score is tallied and they are given a rating based on their performance. The player's score is further adjusted based on play style, which is given a classification like "coward" or "sadist". High scores unlock new masks and weapons for the player to use. Achievements are obtained by doing specific challenges such as killing two enemies in one brick throw.

== Plot ==
In April 1989, Jacket receives a message on his answering machine and a package is delivered to his door containing a rooster mask. The package contains instructions advising Jacket to retrieve a briefcase from the Russian mafia at a metro station. After carrying out the mission, Jacket continues to receive messages instructing him to conduct more massacres. After each mission, he visits a store or restaurant where a man known as Beard (Note: Similarly to Jacket, Beard goes unnamed in the game. In Hotline Miami 2: Wrong Number, the character is known as The Soldier.) meets him and gives him free items such as pizza, films, and alcoholic beverages. During an assault on the estate of a film producer, Jacket rescues a girl and takes her to his apartment, nursing her back to good health and developing a romantic relationship with her. Afterward, he is visited by three masked personas: Richard, Rasmus, and Don Juan, who question him about his actions. These encounters continue throughout the game. In another assault on a phone company, Jacket finds everybody dead except the Biker, who is trying to access a computer, and the two fight to the death. (Note: Jacket and the Biker fight each other twice at different points in the story, with a different outcome each time.)

As Jacket's attacks continue, his perception of reality becomes increasingly more surreal. Talking corpses begin appearing at Beard's places of work until Beard himself abruptly dies, being replaced by a bald man named Richter, who offers Jacket nothing. After coming home one night, Jacket discovers his girlfriend murdered by Richter, who shoots Jacket and places him into a coma. In one final encounter, Richard tells Jacket that he will "never see the full picture" and tells him that he was reliving the events of the past two months while comatose. After waking up, Jacket overhears that Richter has been arrested, and escapes the hospital in search of him. Jacket storms Miami police headquarters, killing almost everyone inside, and confronts Richter, whom he discovers had also been receiving messages. Jacket spares his life (Note: While the player has the choice to either kill or spare Richter, he is seen alive in the game's sequel.) and steals the file on the police investigations of the killings before heading to a nightclub where the calls were traced, killing everyone there as well. He then goes to the Russian Mafia headquarters and confronts both leaders of the syndicate. After Jacket injures one leader and kills his personal bodyguard, one of the leaders "spares him the pleasure" and kills himself. When Jacket confronts the other, he contemplates the things he did and allows Jacket to kill him without resistance. Afterwards, Jacket walks out onto a balcony and lights a cigarette and throws a photo off the balcony.

After completing the levels centered around Jacket, the player unlocks an epilogue centered around the Biker. Similarly to Jacket, the Biker has been receiving messages on his answering machine, and is dedicated to finding their source. After the encounter with Jacket depicted earlier and various interrogations, he finds the source of the messages to be 50 Blessings, a group operated by two janitors that attempt to undermine an "anti-American" alliance between the Soviet Union and the United States by telling their operatives to massacre Russians. The full ending requires the player to find puzzle pieces scattered throughout the game to crack the password for 50 Blessings. If the player cracks the password, the Biker uncovers their secrets and political agenda. Without the password, the Biker is mocked and fails to discover the truth. In both endings, the player has the option to either kill or spare the janitors. After this, the Biker departs from Miami.

== Themes and analysis ==
Hotline Miami advocates an anti-violence message by making the player feel guilt for their in-game massacres. Some found this to be done through the use of upbeat music and its score system to motivate the player. As the game is fast-paced, the player may enter a state where they're focused exclusively on their inputs and become desensitized to their actions. Pitchfork's Nina Corcoran said that the upbeat soundtrack contributed to this by ratcheting the player's anxiety and increasing their focus, while also desensitizing them to the glorified violence. At the end of each level, the upbeat music is replaced with ambience while the player exits the building, with the remains of enemies scattered across the floor. NME's Dom Peppiatt compared Hotline Miami's anti-violence commentary to be similar to A Clockwork Orange (1971) and American Psycho (1991). He wrote that it made players think about where the "line between fiction and reality blurs", and made them reconsider the violence present within video games as a whole.

Each of the masked personas serves a purpose in their encounters; Richard is inquisitive, Don Juan is passive and friendly, while Rasmus is aggressive. They each have a unique color assigned to them that reflects their personality, with Richard's being yellow, Don Juan's being blue, and Rasmus' being red. Each interrogates the player uniquely; Don Juan's dialogue includes lines like "knowing oneself means acknowledging one's actions," while Richard is more upfront, asking "do you like hurting other people?" The masked figures never reveal any details about the identity of Jacket, instead teasing the player directly. The masked figures also foreshadow events in the narrative, such as hinting at the murder of Jacket's girlfriend.

Luca Papale and Lorenzo Fazio suggested that the contrasting behaviors of the masked figures may represent dissociative identity disorder in Jacket. Similar thoughts were expressed by Marco Caracciolo of the University of Groningen, who said that the masked personas could possibly be "projections of Jacket's disturbed psyche." He additionally wrote that the plot is "destined not to make any sense", citing the behavior of the masked figures as well as the contradictions between the perspectives of Jacket and the Biker. Papale and Fazio considered Jacket to be the first example of a "meta-avatar", a type of character with the ability to make players rethink their own actions and destabilize their identities. This type of character was compared by Papale and Fazio to Doomguy from the Doom series and Lara Croft from the Tomb Raider series, who were seen as examples of "mask digital prosthesis", referring to the overlapping of identities between a player and a game's protagonist.

== Development ==
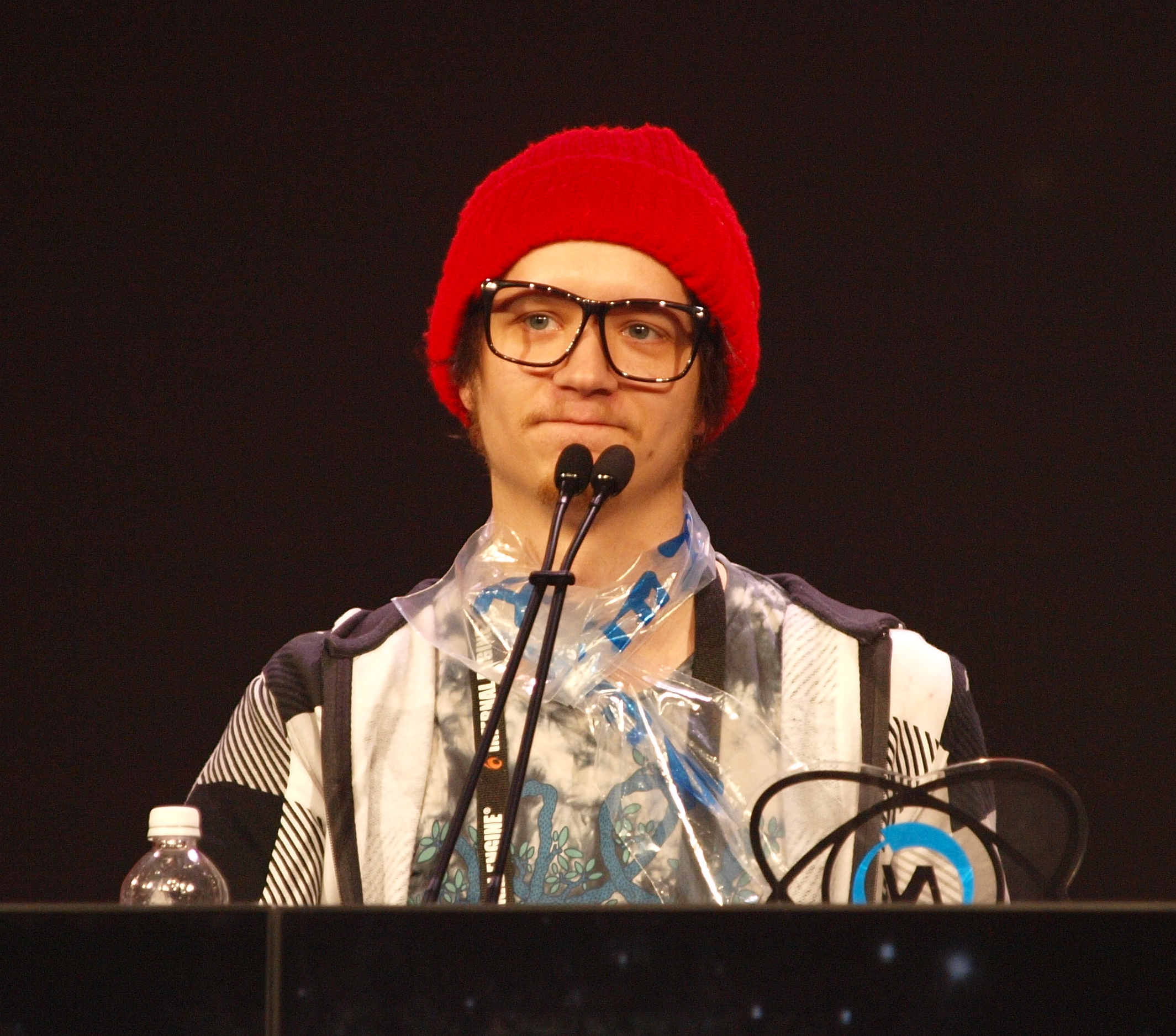
Designer and programmer Jonatan Söderström at the Game Developers Conference in 2010

Hotline Miami was developed by Dennaton Games, a duo composed of Swedish designer and programmer Jonatan Söderström and artist Dennis Wedin. Söderström had previously developed numerous freeware indie games, such as the puzzle game Tuning, which won the Nuovo Award at the Independent Games Festival in 2010. Many of his earlier projects were never completed. Among these was a top-down shooter called Super Carnage, where the goal was to kill as many people as possible. He began work on it in 2004 at the age of 18, but later abandoned it after facing difficulties with developing the AI.

Years later, Söderström met Wedin, a singer and keyboard player for the synthpunk band Fucking Werewolf Asso. The two collaborated in making a promotional game for the band, titled Keyboard Drumset Fucking Werewolf, as well as a separate project named Life/Death/Island. As the latter project became too much work for them to handle, it was abandoned. Following the project's failure, the two decided that their next project was going to be a commercial release. Wedin began searching through Söderström's unfinished works, and came across Super Carnage. Seeing potential in the concept after playing similar games such as Gauntlet (1985) and Chaos Engine (1993), the two began developing Hotline Miami. The game was originally titled Cocaine Cowboy, named after the 2006 documentary Cocaine Cowboys. Throughout development, Söderström posted updates on his Twitter account and blog.

The first playable version was created within the first week of development after Söderström assembled the basics, including a temporary soundtrack. It was developed using the GameMaker engine over the course of nine months, with the developers working twelve hours a day, six days a week. The scope of the project expanded after development studio Vlambeer shared a demo with Devolver Digital, who offered to publish it. Uncertain of success and working with little to no budget, the team repeatedly lost and regained motivation. In an interview with Edge, Wedin described the development as "fucking hard". At one point, Wedin was hospitalized for two weeks during development due to depression caused by a breakup. Development difficulties were further fueled by the outdated version of GameMaker that the duo was using, causing compatibility issues with newer operating systems and several bizarre bugs that were reported by playtesters. Among these bugs was one that would cause a crash if certain printers were plugged into the player's computer.

=== Design ===
In a 2022 interview with Noclip, Wedin stated that they designed Hotline Miami as a game they wanted to play, unconcerned with what the average consumer or a critic would think of it. According to him and Söderström, this allowed the team to determine what would be liked by players, based on whether or not they personally found it fun. They also said they designed the game as an "arcade game first, and a reality simulator second". When designing the AI, the team was conflicted about whether to make it more "believable" or to intentionally make it varied in behavior, but eventually chose the latter. Wedin later stated that they "never wanted to do realistic behavior", and Söderström partially attributed the limitations of GameMaker to the varied behavior of enemies. Some of the mechanics, such as the ability to throw weapons at enemies, were initially coding errors that were turned into proper game mechanics. The levels featuring the Biker were created near the end of development.

The plot was inspired by several movies that the team watched before starting development. Among these were the works of David Lynch, the superhero comedy film Kick-Ass (2010), the Cocaine Cowboys documentary, and Drive (2011). Another inspiration was Gordon Freeman, the silent protagonist of the Half-Life series. Söderström said that Lynch's works left the largest influence, while Drive inspired the minimal dialogue and critique of violence. This led to the creation of the masked personas and their associated scenes. In a June 2012 post on his personal blog, Söderström said that he wanted the project to have an interesting, but non-intrusive story that players could skip through if they wanted. Some of the characters were based on real people, with Beard being based on artist Niklas Åkerblad, a friend of the developers and owner of the apartment in which the two worked, and the janitors being the developers' self-inserts.

The graphics were created by Wedin, using pixel art with a high-contrast colour palette. The first assets, a player sprite and an enemy sprite, were created by Wedin during a weekend within the first few days of development. While the team felt the violence could cause controversy, they believed the decision to use pixel art would mitigate any problems. Wedin stated that, while he thought games that used realistic 3D graphics were often singled out when a real-world attack took place, Hotline Miami's graphics kept it "out of the spotlight." When looking for artists to design the box art, the team initially looked for artists who had worked on older horror films. When they were unable to agree on who should design it, Åkerblad offered to create the box art himself, doing so in about three days.

=== Music ===
"Hydrogen"
An audio sample of the track "Hydrogen" by M.O.O.N., which was highlighted by Pitchfork's Nina Corcoran as an example of a song which increased player focus.

Creating Hotline Miami's soundtrack was a focus of the developers, wanting to create a soundtrack that sounded like a film soundtrack, rather than one from a video game. After failing to obtain the licenses for a temporary soundtrack they put together early in development, the team began searching Bandcamp for tracks available for free download; according to Söderström, the team listened to up to two thousand tracks. Some artists, such as M.O.O.N., were found through this process, while another artist, Scattle, contacted Dennaton directly after seeing blog posts of the development. Tracks from M.O.O.N. were directly added, while Scattle was tasked with composing original music using Renoise. Other artists include Coconuts, Sun Araw, Perturbator, and Åkerblad. The final soundtrack consists of 22 tracks of several different styles, ranging from those that primarily use bass and drums like "Hydrogen", to more upbeat pop tracks such as "Miami Disco" by Perturbator. Genres include electronic, techno, vaporwave, and synthwave.

== Release ==
Hotline Miami was first announced through Söderström's personal blog on 3 July 2012. A teaser trailer was released at the same time. It was later showcased at the A Maze Indie Connect festival, and again at a Rezzed exposition in Brighton. While reception to it at A Maze was mixed, it was later praised by Rezzed attendees. It was the exposition's most played game, and won the Game of the Show award; Tom Bramwell of Eurogamer described it as the "best example of the sort of game we invented the show for". Dennaton purchased a phone number in the Miami area that allowed people to leave messages to be used in a trailer. Hotline Miami was released on Steam on 23 October 2012. Versions with support for MacOS and Linux were released on 19 March 2013 and 9 September 2013, respectively.

In November 2012, an update was released that patched numerous bugs, added support for gamepads, and made minor graphical and gameplay adjustments. This update also added a bonus level, "Highball". Söderström also developed patches for pirated versions of Hotline Miami after several users of the Pirate Bay reported problems. He wanted players to "experience the game the way it's meant to be experienced", regardless of whether or not they obtained it through legitimate means. The soundtrack was released via Steam in January 2013. A physical release, with all of the tracks pressed across three vinyls, was released in 2016 by Laced Records. It was a limited release, with only 5,000 copies made, and was funded by a Kickstarter campaign that raised over $75,000.

Versions of Hotline Miami for PlayStation 3 and PlayStation Vita, ported by Abstraction Games, were released on 25 June 2013 in North America, and a day later in Europe. These releases supported cross-buy, allowing players who purchased the game on one platform to receive it on the other. These ports added a bonus mask and leaderboards. A version for PlayStation 4, also supporting cross-buy, was released on 19 August 2014. A Japan-localized compilation, featuring Hotline Miami and its sequel Hotline Miami 2: Wrong Number (2015), titled Hotline Miami: Collected Edition, was released in June 2015. On 19 August 2019, Hotline Miami and Hotline Miami 2 were rereleased as part of the Hotline Miami Collection for Nintendo Switch. The Hotline Miami Collection was later ported to Xbox One and Stadia on 7 April and 22 September 2020 respectively, and PlayStation 5 and Xbox Series X/S on 23 October 2023.

== Reception ==
Reception

Aggregate score
Aggregator	Score
Metacritic	(PC) 85/100 (PS3) 87/100 (Vita) 85/100

Review scores
Publication	Score
Eurogamer	10/10
Game Informer	7.75/10
GameSpot	8.5/10
GamesRadar+	4/5
IGN	8.8/10
PC Gamer (US)	86/100
Polygon	8.5/10
VideoGamer.com	9/10
PopMatters	9/10

Hotline Miami received generally positive reviews from critics. On review aggregator website Metacritic, it holds an aggregate score of 85 per cent based on 51 reviews for the PC version, 87 per cent based on 19 reviews for the PlayStation 3 version, and 85 per cent based on 27 reviews for the PlayStation Vita version.

Several reviewers praised the gameplay. Many found it enjoyable, considering it addictive despite frequent death. Polygon's Chris Plante considered it similar to playing a sport, stating that it compensated for being repetitive by allowing the player to restart quickly, and found it addictive. Graham Smith of PC Gamer wrote that the game was designed to "inspire a fever" and that "once you're hooked, it's easy to get carried away". He also wrote that, even when putting the addictive nature aside, it was still "tight" and "efficient". Phill Cameron of VideoGamer.com described it as "five seconds of action that you can lose yourself in for five hours." Danny O'Dwyer of GameSpot was indifferent, though he wrote that the times Hotline Miami did "get it wrong" were "deeply frustrating". He pointed out the boss fights, which he felt had arbitrary methods on how to defeat them.

Some criticized the controls. Ben Reeves of Game Informer wrote that the controls inhibited what was otherwise "one of the most creative indie titles of the year." Eric Swain of PopMatters felt that the PlayStation 3 controls made the game easier, and so players would "miss out" on the intended feel. Giancarlo Saldana of GamesRadar+ felt that the controls on the PlayStation 3 took some time to get used to, and that playing it on computer was more ideal.

Hotline Miami's narrative was well received, with Reeves describing it as "perfectly [placing] you inside the mind of a serial killer." Saldana described it as an "introspective journey into the violence of video games", and that it had a "daring narrative style" that gained the attention of players. Plante wrote that the game had "more to say about our fascination with violence" than other titles, describing Hotline Miami as an exceptional game not due to its violence, but because it had a "reason" to be violent. While Smith felt that the narrative was lacking in depth and no justification was given for the violence, he believed that too many other video games offered clichéd reasons for violence, and described it as a "relief". Cameron wrote that the game missed an "opportunity to make a point" and never properly explained why so many people were being killed, instead allowing the player to reflect on themselves. The visual design was also well received, often being discussed alongside Hotline Miami's narrative and sound design.

The soundtrack was praised, with several critics highlighting it as one of the best aspects. Reeves described the soundtrack as doing a "phenomenal job", and Saldana felt that it was "executed perfectly". O'Dwyer described it as "outstanding" and fitting well with the visual design, believing that both combined were able to allow the player to look past the flaws. Charles Onyett of IGN wrote that the soundtrack "[meshes] perfectly". Eurogamer's Tom Bramwell shared similar thoughts as O'Dwyer and Onyett, feeling that while the soundtrack was less impactful on its own, it tied in well with the other elements.

=== Sales ===
Hotline Miami sold over 130,000 units in seven weeks. By the time the PlayStation 3 version was announced in February 2013, it had sold 300,000 units. According to Anthony John Agnello of Digital Trends, the commercial success up to that point was the reason Sony wanted Hotline Miami on the platform, helping the company "maintain its reputation" as a "purveyor" of indie titles after the success of Journey (2012). When Hotline Miami was released on PlayStation Vita, it became the platform's best selling game of June 2013 within six days, despite releasing near the end of the month. By May 2015, Hotline Miami had sold over 1.5 million units on all platforms.

=== Awards ===
A month before release, Hotline Miami won the "Most Fantastic" award at the 2012 Fantastic Arcade festival in Austin. At the end of the year, Hotline Miami was nominated for several awards by IGN. These included "Best Overall Game", "Best PC Action Game", "Best PC Story", "Best PC Game", "Best Overall Action Game", "Best Overall Music", and "Best PC Sound", only winning the latter. PC Gamer gave Hotline Miami its "The Best Music of the Year 2012" award. At the 2012 Machinima's Inside Gaming Awards, Hotline Miami received the "Most Original Game" award. It was nominated for several awards at the Independent Games Festival in 2013, including the Seumas McNally Grand Prize, Excellence in Audio, and Excellence in Design. Several publications considered Hotline Miami to be one of the best games released in 2012, including Kill Screen, Paste, Ars Technica, Wired, The Guardian, and VentureBeat.

== Legacy ==
Retrospective commentary has considered Hotline Miami to be one of the most influential indie games ever made, as well as one of the most critically and financially successful. (Note: Attributed to several sources) Its success inspired many to become video game developers, contributing to a rise in indie game releases throughout the 2010s. Many of these games include similar themes, gameplay mechanics, or music to Hotline Miami. Games influenced by Hotline Miami continued to be made over a decade after its release, ranging from indie games to ones made by larger, big-budget studios like Naughty Dog's The Last of Us Part II (2020). The soundtrack was also influential, (Note: Attributed to several sources) helping popularize synthwave and leading to the mainstream success of the featured artists. The game contributed to the success of Devolver Digital, which has since become one of the most successful indie game publishers.

Hotline Miami's narrative and handling of violence have been considered by many journalists to be influential within the video game industry, with an impact lasting into the 2020s. In a 2019 retrospective article from Vice's Cameron Kunzelman, he described Hotline Miami's anti-violence themes as an "emblem of a forgotten regime" alongside other games released at the time like Spec Ops: The Line (2012). He felt that since Hotline Miami's release, more video games had started treating violence as a method of demonstrating "seriousness" without a proper justification. He specifically highlighted a trailer for The Last of Us Part II, as well as how some of Hotline Miami's more serious dialogue had become internet memes. He also said that video games were due for "another shift" in how to treat violence. Chris Tapsell of Eurogamer echoed similar thoughts as Kunzelman in 2024, describing Hotline Miami as the video game industry's "coming-of-age moment" and a point of self-reflection.

In 2023, TechRadar's Aleksha McLoughlin described Hotline Miami as the "gold standard" for an indie game, deeming it the best in its sub-genre, with no other games comparing to its success. Nina Corcoran of Pitchfork shared similar thoughts, saying that Dennaton designed the game to be "incredibly replayable" several years later. In a 2022 article published by The Ringer, Lewis Gordon described Hotline Miami as a game that "[stretched] the boundaries" of the video game industry, as one of the more "warmly-regarded" indie games. Christopher Cruz of Rolling Stone described Hotline Miami as a "titan of indie gaming", one with an "impact [that] has reached far and wide". The game has also attracted a cult following.

Hotline Miami has been named one of the best video games by publications, including GamesRadar+, Slant Magazine, Hardcore Gaming 101, Stuff.tv, Popular Mechanics, GamesTM, USA Today, and Sports Illustrated. It was named one of the best PC games by the editorial teams of PC Gamer and Rock, Paper, Shotgun, and one of the best PlayStation Vita games by Digital Trends and GamesRadar+. It was also listed in the book 1001 Video Games You Must Play Before You Die. Writers from Paste, GameSpot, PCMag and VG247 named the soundtrack to be one of the best from a video game.

=== Sequel and franchise ===
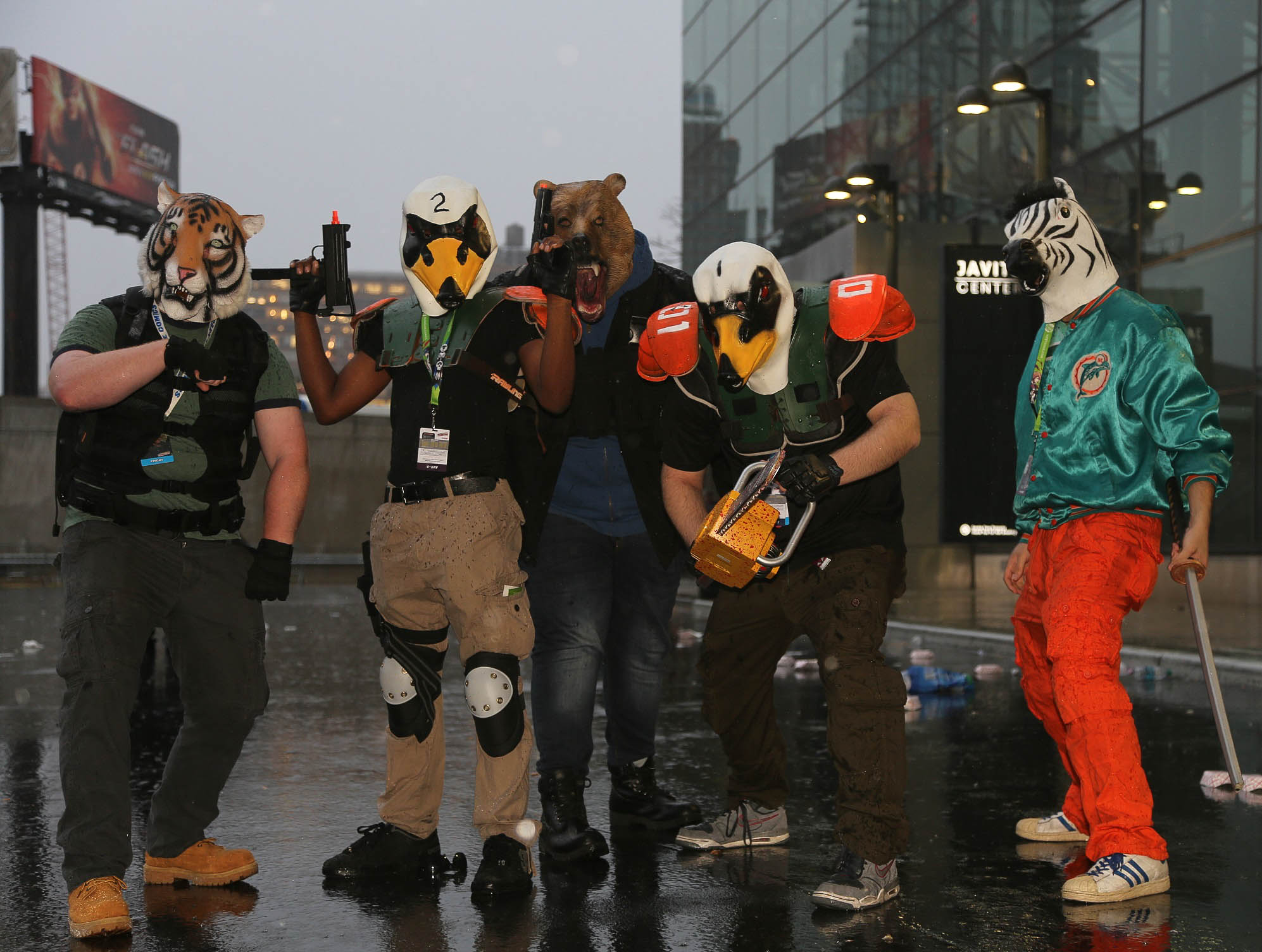
A group of people cosplaying as Hotline Miami characters at New York Comic Con in 2015

Shortly after the game's release, Dennaton began developing downloadable content to expand upon its story and add a level editor. When the proposed length of the project surpassed that of the main game, it became a standalone game. Announced ten days after the release of Hotline Miami, Hotline Miami 2: Wrong Number was released on 10 March 2015. It introduced new characters and focused on the background and aftermath of Jacket's massacres. It also served as the conclusion of the series' story. Due to differences in gameplay and level design, Hotline Miami 2: Wrong Number was not received as well as the first game. Both games were included in the Hotline Miami Collection, which was first released in August 2019. As of 2022, both games in the series have sold over five million units combined across several platforms. In 2025, Devolver Digital reported that Hotline Miami was its seventh most profitable IP, generating over $30 million in lifetime revenue.

An eight-part comic book series based on the series, Hotline Miami: Wildlife, was announced in 2016. Released digitally over the course of several months, it follows a protagonist named Chris and depicts events not considered canon to the main Hotline Miami story. A parody, "Hotline Milwaukee", is included in Devolver Bootleg, a 2019 compilation of parodies of numerous games published by Devolver Digital. Jacket has appeared as a playable character in other games, such as Payday 2 and Dead Cells. Several fan games based on the series have been created, often incorporating elements from other games such as Team Fortress 2 and Half-Life. Among these was Midnight Animal, a fan game that would have incorporated elements from the Persona series, but was cancelled by 2019.
