= Spelunky =

2008 video game

- Title screen of the original Windows game
- Developer: Mossmouth
- Publishers: Mossmouth; Microsoft Studios (X360)
- Designer: Derek Yu
- Programmer: Andy Hull
- Composers: George Buzinkai; Jonathan Perry; Eirik Suhrke (remake)
- Engine: GameMaker Studio
- Platforms: Windows; Xbox 360; PlayStation 3; PlayStation 4; PlayStation Vita; ChromeOS; Switch
- Release: Windows: WW: December 21, 2008; WW: August 8, 2013 (remake); Xbox 360: NA: July 4, 2012; EU: July 5, 2012; PS3, PS Vita: NA: August 27, 2013; EU: August 28, 2013; PlayStation 4: NA: October 7, 2014; EU: October 8, 2014; Switch; August 26, 2021
- Genres: Platform, roguelike
- Modes: Single-player, multiplayer (remake)

Spelunky is a 2008 platform video game created by independent developer Derek Yu and released as source-available freeware for Microsoft Windows. It was remade for the Xbox 360 in 2012, with ports of the new version following for various platforms, including back to Microsoft Windows. The player controls a spelunker who explores a series of caves while collecting treasure, saving damsels, fighting enemies, and dodging traps. The caves are procedurally generated, making each run-through of the game unique.

The first public release was on December 21, 2008. The source code of the Windows version was released on December 25, 2009. An enhanced version for Xbox Live Arcade was released on July 4, 2012. The enhanced version was later released for Windows and PlayStation 3 in August 2013, and for PlayStation 4 in October 2014. The remake was also made available on Xbox One via backward compatibility in December 2015. A fanmade, ChromeOS version of the original game was made as well, titled Spelunky HTML5. A port for Nintendo Switch was released on August 26, 2021. A sequel, Spelunky 2, was released in September 2020.

Spelunky was one of the first games to borrow concepts from roguelikes and combine them with real-time side-scrolling platformer elements. Due to its popularity, it was the influence for many later "roguelite" games. Spelunky received critical acclaim for its gameplay, atmosphere and design, though some controls and multiplayer elements polarized critics. Many critics and publications regarded it as one of the greatest video games of all time.

== Gameplay ==
In the tutorial, the player starts off playing as Yang, who leaves a journal which is found by the next Spelunker, who is later confirmed in the second game to be known as Guy Spelunky. The aim of the game is to explore tunnels, gathering as much treasure as possible while avoiding traps and enemies. The spelunker can whip or jump on enemies to defeat them, pick up items that can be thrown to either attack enemies or set off traps, and use a limited supply of bombs and ropes to navigate the caves. Levels are randomly generated and grouped into four increasingly difficult "areas", each with a distinctive set of items, enemies, terrain types and special features. Later areas contain more valuable treasures, secret locations, and items. If the player loses all their hearts or runs into an instant-kill trap, they will have to start from the beginning.

Enemies include animals like bats, snakes and spiders of varying sizes, other characters, and monsters like yeti, man-eating plants and ghosts. The player can collect many items, mainly gold and jewels which add to the player's score, but also useful objects including bombs, guns, climbing gear and archaeological artifacts. Some of the latter have supernatural abilities, including kapalas, hedjets, crystal skulls and golden ankhs, though many of these special items can only be gained through secret methods, like combining other items. Some items may be purchased or stolen from shops scattered about the caves, though the shopkeepers become powerful enemies if the player steals from them.

The player can also encounter damsels in distress trapped in the caves, who can be picked up and carried to an exit. Successfully doing so returns health to the player. It's possible to unlock the damsel as a playable character; gameplay is identical, except that the player encounters spelunkers to rescue. Another unlockable character is the "Tunnel Man", who possesses a mattock instead of a whip.

The Xbox Live Arcade, as well as the PlayStation Network versions of the game feature local multiplayer (co-op and deathmatch) for up to four players. There are 9 different characters to play as.

The original Spelunky also includes a level editor, in which players can create their own non-random levels to share with others.

== Development ==
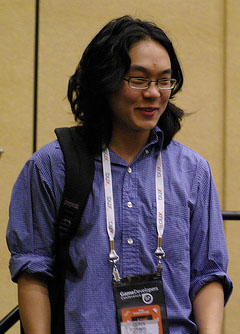
Derek Yu at GDC 2007

Spelunky was created by Derek Yu and released as freeware for Microsoft Windows on December 21, 2008. The source code of the Windows version was published under a software license permitting noncommercial distribution and modification on December 25, 2009. Based on this source code the game community created a community patch which added support for Mac OS X. Since the game source code became available community members have created many modified versions, or mods, of the original game. Most of these were available via the forums on the website for Derek Yu's video game company, Mossmouth, where a list was maintained of finished mods. The website "Spelunky.fyi" was created by the community to maintain a list of community-made content after the Mossmouth forums were shut down.

The first version of Spelunky classic was released as freeware on a private space called TIGSource forums where some players were exposed to the game and provided Derek Yu with immediate feedback for the game creating a loop of development where new additions were added to the game in response to player feedback. Shortly after, Derek released a public version of the game which gained greater exposure. Jonathan Blow, developer of Braid, reached out to Derek concerning releasing the game officially on console platforms which was a huge benefit for indie developers at the time considering the success of other indie games at the time such as Castle Crashers and World of Goo. While looking for programmers to help him on the project he reconnected with longtime friend Andy Hull who offered his services.

An enhanced remake version for Xbox Live Arcade was released on July 4, 2012. The enhanced edition was also released for PC and PlayStation 3 in August 2013.

=== Influences ===
Spelunky draws from La-Mulana, Rick Dangerous, and Spelunker for its visual styling, character design, gameplay elements and general mechanics. Essentially a dungeon crawl, it also adds elements from the roguelike genre, including randomly generated levels, a lack of save points, frequent and easy death, and discovery mechanics. It draws equally from the 2D platformer genre, including real-time interactions with enemies. According to Yu, the Super Mario series of video games was one of the game's biggest inspirations, especially in "feel and physics". Derek found inspiration in the rogue like genre from the random generation features of each playthrough but found the turn based dungeon crawling elements of typical roguelikes uninteresting. However he found the higher concepts such as universal intractability and the consequences of permadeath much more exciting. By taking these higher concepts and combining them with the features of platform games he was able to develop the initial conception for Spelunky using procedural generation. He also took inspiration from the level of interactivity with elements of the world that old roguelikes like NetHack had, without resorting to the long lists of keyboard commands those games used and instead opted for just one button to interact with any given object.

Aztec, Balding's Quest, Kagirinaki Tatakai, NetHack, Indiana Jones, and Cave Story have also been credited as influences.

== Design ==
Spelunky is notorious for its difficult gameplay as many hazards and enemies are capable of killing the player quickly. Derek found that a punishing gameplay experience caused players to behave in unique ways, forcing the player to think more about their actions and what plans they have to remain alive. Even Edmund McMillen, a notable game developer who created successfully challenging games such as Super Meat Boy, told him that the starting area's arrow traps should do less damage, but Derek was adamant that the immediate difficulty was necessary to show players not already familiar with the roguelike structure that death and failure is an expected part of gameplay.

Destructibility of terrain was also a key element of the level design in Spelunky inspired by the pickaxe's abilities in another roguelike game called NetHack. Derek found that it made the level progression more lenient as players could create their own paths instead of using the path generated by the level.

Derek associated his enemy design with the behavior of the ghosts from Pac-Man and how they differed their approaches to interacting with the player but collectively provided a unified and diverse experience.

Spelunky screenshot comparison of the original version from 2008 (left) and the HD remake from 2012 (right)

== Reception ==
Reception

Aggregate score
Aggregator	Score
Metacritic	X360: 87/100; PC: 90/100; PS3: 83/100; VITA: 88/100

Review scores
Publication	Score
1Up.com	A
Eurogamer	10/10
GameSpot	(X360) 8/10 (PC) 8.5/10 (Vita) 9/10
GamesRadar+	5/5
GameTrailers	8.3/10
IGN	9/10
Nintendo Life	8/10
Nintendo World Report	7/10

IGN gave the XBLA version a score of 9.0 and an Editor's Choice award, calling it "a superb 2D platformer that's as easy to hate as it is to love". GamesRadar gave the game 5/5, praising its gameplay and constant sense of discovery. GameTrailers gave the game a score of 8.3, praising its design but criticizing some control quirks and throwaway multiplayer. 1UP.com gave the game an A ranking, saying "it offers the same immediate, pick-up-and-play fun of Geometry Wars, but demands much more than the simple reflexive reactions of your lizard brain".

PC Gamer UK chose the remake of Spelunky as its 2013 game of the year. Eurogamer ranked Spelunky third on its Games of the Generation list. In 2015, Rock, Paper, Shotgun ranked the original Spelunky 1st on its The 50 Best Free Games On PC list. A difficult challenge run of Spelunky HD, known as an "eggplant run", was reported on by various video game news websites. In 2019, Spelunky was ranked 36th on The Guardian newspaper's The 50 Best Video Games of the 21st Century list.

The spelunker, the main character of Spelunky, is one of several indie game characters who can be unlocked and played in Super Meat Boy. Referred to as "Spelunky" in Super Meat Boy, the character has the special power of explosive jumps (referencing the bombs he carries in the original game), and he is exclusive to the Xbox Live Arcade version. He also makes an appearance in Runner2 as a DLC character.

Spelunky was a commercial success, selling over one million units by 2016. The Steam launch was noted to be particularly successful by Derek Yu, with 61,408 units sold within the first week, and 577,185 units throughout the game's lifetime.

== Adaptations ==
In August 2024, it was revealed that the game would feature in Secret Level, a video game anthology series for Amazon Prime Video.

== See also ==
- List of open source games
