= Pas Tasta =

Japanese pop group

- Origin: Tokyo, Japan
- Genres: J-pop, Hyperpop
- Years active: 2022-present
- Members: Amane Uyama, Hirihiri, Kabanagu, Phritz, Quoree, Yuigot

Pas Tasta (commonly stylized in all caps) is a Japanese electronic music group, formed in 2022. The group currently consists of producers Amane Uyama, Hirihiri, Kabanagu, Phritz, Quoree, and Yuigot, all of whom had solo careers before forming Pas Tasta.

== History ==
The members of Pas Tasta met through collaborating on songs for netlabels. Several members have released music on Maltine Records. The group collaborates through Discord, passing around project files and iterating on them until release. Pas Tasta's debut album Good Pop was released on March 15, 2023, and included features from Peterparker69, Soushi Sakiyama, and Mamiko Suzuki of Chelmico. NME named it as their 18th best Asian album of 2023. "Good Pop" was followed later in the year by a remix album, which saw Pas Tasta collaborate with Bo En, Six Impala and Pasocom Music Club.

Pas Tasta's second album Grand Pop was released on November 22, 2024. Pitchfork gave the album a 7.6/10, calling it a "perfect microcosm of J-pop's evolution over the past few years." The album featured artists such as Chelmico, PinocchioP, and Tatsuya Kitani.

In April 2025, Spotify Japan named Pas Tasta as one of their 10 Early Noise artists. In October, it was announced that Pas Tasta would create the ending theme for the anime adaptation of You and I Are Polar Opposites.

On January 7, 2026, Pas Tasta announced their collaboration with Kento Nakajima on a song from his album "IDOL1ST".

Pas Tasta also contributes music to commercials, working with companies such as Hololive and Google.

== Discography ==
=== Studio albums ===
No.	Album details
1	Good Pop: Released: March 15, 2023
2	Grand Pop: Released: November 22, 2024
