= Without Time =

Without Time is a Polish indie rock/experimental duo from Gdańsk, formed in 2010 and consisting of Alex Kondrashoff (vocals, keyboards) and Ian Kolomytsky (guitars, drums).

== Career ==
In June 2010, the band released their first single "Trap", which was recorded in a small recording studio in Belarus. The single was released on several independent netlabels: Dystopaq (USA), Trastienda (Spain) and Mimonot Records (Russia). Also, "Trap" was entered into a series of compilations from over the world.
After the release of the single, band began hard work on the first full-length album, entitled "Haunted Places". The main compositional idea of the album is mixing and experiments with totally different music genres. You can hear soft and flying, but sometimes so evil guitars, quiet and slow, but sometimes dancing and dynamic vocals, broken and electronic, but sometimes fast and real drums.
At the moment, Without Time are writing new songs and looking for a record label.

== Discography ==
=== Singles ===
- "Trap" (2010)
