= Calum Bowen =

English musician and video game producer (born 1991)

- Born: 26 February 1991 (age 35); London, England
- Genres: Pop; electronic; J-pop
- Occupations: Musician; composer; record producer; livestreamer
- Instrument: Piano
- Years active: 2013–present
- Label: Maltine Records
- Website: bo-en.info

YouTube information
- Channel: bo en
- Subscribers: 234 thousand
- Views: 99 million
- Last updated: 8 November 2026

Calum Thomas Bowen (born 26 February 1991), also known professionally as Bo En (stylised as bo en), is an English musician and video game producer. He was born in London.

== Career ==
Bowen released his debut album, pale machine, in 2013. In 2014, he released a physical CD titled 'pale machine [EXPANSION PACK]', adding four new tracks composed by Bowen and six remixes of songs from pale machine. Bowen's 2014 remix of "My Party" by Kero Kero Bonito was featured on their Bonito Recycling EP. Over the course of the following years he wrote three singles: "By the Phone", "sometimes" and "love in a song". In 2021, Bowen released a satirical remix of "love in a song", titled "love in a song - DJ HEARTBREAK ANNIHILATION MIX".

Bowen released a follow up to his debut titled Pale Machine 2 which contained re-imaginings of songs off his pale machine record as well as original songs featuring a variety of other artists. Two songs originally released in the pale machine expansion pack, "I'll Fall" and "Money Won't Pay", were included as tracks 9 and 10 on this release.

For the 10th anniversary of his album pale machine, Bowen, fellow musical artist Kikuo, and Gus Lobban of Kero Kero Bonito toured in the United States from 9 January 2024 to 27 January 2024. The tour included 11 venues total across the country.

=== Video game composing ===
Under his real name Calum Bowen (stylised as calum bowen), he wrote the soundtrack to Up Up Ubie and Super Ubie Land. He then continued to write songs for smaller games such as Marble Time, Thief Story and Winnose. Bowen later composed the soundtrack for the 2014 game Lovely Planet, followed by Lovely Planet Arcade and Lovely Planet 2: April Skies.

He also composed the soundtrack for Pikuniku, which was released in 2019, along with three songs for Omori, which was released in late 2020. One of the three songs composed for Omori was a pitched-up and shortened in-game version of "My Time", a song originally included in pale machine. The Omori soundtrack was expanded in 2022, with the addition of two new songs featured in the console version of the game, which were also composed by Bowen. Bowen composed the music for Voyage, which was released in 2021. In addition, he produced the soundtrack for Netflix's Poinpy, a mobile game published by Netflix Games and was released in 2022.

== Discography ==
=== Studio albums ===
- pale machine (2013, Maltine)
- pale machine [EXPANSION PACK] (2014, Maltine)
- pale machine 10 year anniversary re-master (2023, Maltine)
- Pale Machine 2 (2023)

=== Extended plays ===
- ぼくらのいろとりどり (2016, ft. あきお)

=== Singles ===
- "By the Phone" (2015)
- "sometimes" (2016)
- "love in a song" (2018)

=== Animation soundtracks ===
- Beetle + Bean (2021)
- The Amazing Digital Circus: The Last Act (2026)
- The All-nimal (2026)

=== Video game soundtracks ===
- MOSHIMOSHI (2013)
- Marble Time (2013)
- Up Up Ubi
- Super Ubie Land (2013)
- Thief Story
- Winnose (2014)
- Lovely Planet (2014)
- Lovely Planet Arcade (2016)
- Pakka Pets (2016)
- Snipperclips (2017)
- YIIK: A Postmodern RPG (2019)
- Pikuniku (2019)
- Lovely Planet 2: April Skies (2019)
- Crossy Road Castle (2020)
- Omori (2020)
- Voyage (2021)
- Poinpy (2022)
- Ooblets (2022)
- Pikuniku 2 (2027)

=== Video game sound design ===
- Valdis Story: Abyssal City (2013)
- Dragon: A Game About a Dragon (2015)
- Lovely Planet: Arcade (2016)
- Pikuniku (2019)
- Tangle Tower (2019)
- The Mermaid Mask (2026)
- Pikuniku 2 (2027)

=== Remixes ===
- "Candy Flavored Lips" (bo en イパネマREMIX) (2013)
- "My Party" (Kero Kero Bonito) (2014)
- "Veranda" (Bo En Megacrazymix) (2018)
- "NRG" (Babymorocco) (2023)
- "finger frame" ft. 鈴木真海子 (PAS TASTA) (2023)
