= Fine Line =

Fine Line may refer to:

== Music ==
=== Albums ===
- A Fine Line, an album by Heather Ranking, 2016
- Fine Line (Harry Styles album), a 2019 album by Harry Styles
- Fine Line (Pasocom Music Club album), a 2023 album by Pasocom Music Club

=== Songs ===
- "Fine Line" (Barry Gibb song), 1984 from Now Voyager
- "Fine Line" (Harry Styles song), 2019 from Fine Line
- "Fine Line" (Kesha song), 2023 from Gag Order
- "Fine Line" (Mabel song), 2018 from Ivy to Roses re-issue
- "Fine Line" (Paul McCartney song), 2005 from Chaos and Creation in the Backyard
- "Fine Line", a song by Chumbawamba from The Boy Bands Have Won, 2008
- "Fine Line", a song by Eminem from the compilation album Shady XV, 2014
- "A Fine Line", a 1992 song by Radney Foster from Del Rio, TX 1959, covered as "Fine Line" by Hootie & the Blowfish

== Other uses ==
- Fine Line Features, division of New Line Cinema
- Fine Line (film), a 2023 documentary film directed by Anna Barsukova.
- Fine Line, a documentary series written and directed by Ellen Fanning
- "A Fine Line", an exhibition by Inka Essenhigh

== See also ==
- "There's a Fine, Fine Line", a song from Avenue Q
- Fine Fine Line, an album by Andy Fraser
