= Omori (video game) =

2020 role-playing video game

- Developers: OMOCAT, LLC. (Note: "Omocat" was initially solely the moniker of the original developer, but was later expanded to refer to the whole development studio.)
- Publishers: OMOCAT, LLC.
- Director: Omocat
- Designers: Charlene Lu; Emily Shaw; Keane Park
- Artists: Omocat; Charlene Lu; Emily Shaw
- Writers: Andrew Batino; Omocat; Andrew Vance
- Composers: Pedro Silva; Jami Lynne; Calum Bowen
- Engine: RPG Maker MV
- Platforms: macOS; Windows; Nintendo Switch; Xbox One; Xbox Series X/S; PlayStation 4
- Release: macOS, Windows; WW: December 25, 2020; JP: December 19, 2021; Nintendo Switch, Xbox One, Series X/S; WW: June 17, 2022; PlayStation 4; NA: June 24, 2022
- Genre: Role-playing
- Mode: Single-player

Omori (stylized in all caps) is a 2020 role-playing video game developed and published by indie studio Omocat. The player controls a reclusive hikikomori boy named Sunny and his dream world alter ego Omori. Gameplay is split into two settings: Sunny's activities in Faraway Town and Omori's exploration of a surreal dream world. How Sunny and Omori interact depends on choices made by the player, resulting in one of several endings, in which Sunny either overcomes or suppresses his fears and repressed memories. The game's turn-based battle system includes unconventional status effects based on characters' emotions. Prominently portraying concepts such as anxiety, depression, psychological trauma, self-harm, and suicide, the game features strong psychological horror elements.

Omori is based on the director's webcomic series Omoriboy. After a successful Kickstarter campaign, the game was delayed numerous times and experienced several development difficulties. It was released as a demo on April 9, 2018, on the platform itch.io exclusively for Kickstarter backers, before being officially released for macOS and Windows in December 2020, six years after its initial funding. It saw a release on Nintendo Switch, Xbox One, Xbox Series X/S and PlayStation 4 with added content in June 2022. Critics praised the game's art direction, soundtrack, narrative elements, and depiction of anxiety and depression, being favorably compared to games like EarthBound (1994) and Yume Nikki (2004). Omori was nominated for several awards, winning DreamHack's "Daringly Dramatic" category in 2021. The game has sold over 1 million copies as of December 2022. A manga adaptation was released in June 2024.

== Gameplay ==
Omori utilizes a rock-paper-scissors-type system during battles in which certain emotions are strong or weak against each other.

Omori's gameplay is inspired by traditional Japanese role-playing games. Gameplay is split between two settings: the surreal dream world of Headspace and the real world, set in Faraway Town. In Headspace, the player controls a party of four characters: Omori, Aubrey, Kel, and Hero. In the real world, the player begins with only Sunny. Each party member possesses their own unique skills for use both in battle and in overworld traversal.

The overworld portion is played from a top-down perspective. The game features side quests and puzzles for the player to solve, bestowing them with various rewards and skills upon completion. In Headspace, many beneficial weapons and items can be obtained, with some being purchasable using the currency Clams. In the real world, the effects of items are more limited, and the player uses dollars.

Battles are played out in a turn-based format in which each party member performs a move. After attacking, party members can work together to perform "follow up" attacks, which come from a shared pool of energy that accumulates upon taking damage. Characters and enemies have Heart, which functions as health points; if damage is taken, it decreases, and if it reaches zero, the character is defeated and turns into toast. (Note: Omori can avoid dying once per battle.) The Juice meter is used to perform skills, special abilities which aid in battle. Outside of battle, the party can save and heal by interacting with a picnic blanket, accompanied by Omori's older sister Mari.

Unlike most role-playing games, status effects are based on a three-pointed emotion system. A party member or opponent's emotion can change throughout the course of a battle, usually due to moves by another party member or enemy. Neutral is the baseline and has no effects; Angry increases attack but lowers defense; Sad increases defense but lowers speed, as well as converting a portion of damage to Heart into damage to Juice; and Happy increases luck and speed but lowers accuracy. Emotions are either strong or weak against each other – Happy beats Angry, Angry beats Sad, and Sad beats Happy. Additionally, higher-intensity variants of each emotion also exist.

== Plot ==
Omori awakens in "White Space", a barren void he has lived in "for as long as [he] can remember". He enters a door to the vibrant world of "Headspace", where he meets his friends, Aubrey, brothers Kel and Hero, Basil, and Omori's older sister Mari. They peruse Basil's photo album, containing pictures of their shared memories, and decide to visit his house. Once there, Kel and Aubrey scuffle, damaging the album. Upon seeing a disturbing photo fall from it, Basil panics, and Omori is abruptly teleported back to White Space. He stabs himself with a knife, revealing Headspace to be the dream world of a teenage boy, Sunny, as he wakes up in the middle of the night.

It is revealed that Sunny and his mother are moving. He goes downstairs for a midnight snack but is confronted by a nightmarish hallucination. He dispels the illusion by taking deep breaths and returns to bed. Awakening in White Space, Omori reunites with Aubrey, Kel, and Hero. They discover that Basil has gone missing and set out to rescue him. The four explore the various regions of Headspace in search of Basil, with Mari assisting along the way. The group is continuously diverted from their search by various situations, leading their memory of Basil to fade away.

Omori's narrative juxtaposes vibrant imagery with foreboding themes and environments.

Later, in the real world, it is revealed that Mari killed herself four years ago, leading to the friend group diverging. Though Kel and Hero recovered to varying degrees, Sunny became an estranged shut-in, Aubrey a delinquent, and Basil an anxious recluse. Three days before Sunny moves away, Kel knocks on his door in an attempt to reconnect one last time. The player can either ignore Kel or answer the door: by choosing the former, Sunny stays inside for the remaining three days, immersing himself in housework and his dreams.

By choosing the latter, Sunny and Kel venture to find Aubrey and her new friends bullying Basil. They discover that she has stolen Basil's photo album, ostensibly to stop him from vandalizing it. After confronting Aubrey, they return the album to Basil, though some photos are missing. Basil lends the album to Sunny, believing he needs it more. While eating dinner together, Basil becomes visibly distressed as he learns of Sunny's impending departure and runs to the bathroom. Sunny finds him in a hallucinatory panic attack, but leaves him alone out of fear. The next day, Kel and Sunny encounter Aubrey and her gang surrounding Basil at their old hangout spot. After they confront her, Aubrey angrily pushes Basil into a lake. Sunny dives in to rescue him, but both boys are saved from drowning by the arrival of Hero, and they carry Basil back to his home.

Kel and Hero offer to have a sleepover in Sunny's house. In his sleep, they return to Basil's now-dilapidated house, where Omori is transported to the more disturbing "Black Space". Basil appears in different areas, repeatedly attempting to talk to him about something before dying gruesomely each time. In the final room, Omori kills Basil and places himself atop a throne of massive, red hands. On the last day before Sunny's departure, the others reconcile with Aubrey, discovering she had kept the photos containing Mari from the album. Coming to terms with Mari's death, the reunited friend group decide to spend their final night together at Basil's house, despite him refusing to leave his room.

Eventually, in his dreams, Sunny finally confronts the truth about Mari's death: Sunny was frustrated that he couldn't perform as well as anticipated on the violin (which was a gift from his friends), and threw the violin down the stairs on the day of an upcoming recital, shattering it. This infuriated Mari, and as Sunny tried to walk away from her, she blocked his path and he accidentally pushed her down their staircase, killing her. Basil arrived at that moment and witnessed the incident; devastated over Mari's death and in denial that Sunny did it, he helped frame her death as suicide by hanging her corpse. As the boys finished, they glanced at Mari's hanging body, its immediate appearance shaping their subsequent hallucinations. While Basil was consumed by guilt and self-loathing, Sunny's depression led him to create Headspace and his alter ego, Omori, to repress his trauma. After facing the reality, Sunny wakes up in the middle of the night, leaving the player with the choice of either confronting Basil or falling back asleep.

=== Endings ===
If the player confronts Basil, Sunny enters his room and is cordially greeted. However, Basil loses his temper over Sunny's absence in the aftermath of Mari's death, and it is revealed that Sunny is the one who vandalized the photo album, causing both to enter a delusional state and fight. When Basil stabs Sunny in the right eye with garden shears, both pass out. While unconscious, Sunny reminisces about his childhood spent with his friends and Mari, giving him the strength to face Omori. Refusing to die, Omori lambasts Sunny for keeping the truth of Mari's death from his friends and eventually defeats him, causing the player to receive a game over screen.

- If the player opts to continue, Sunny gets up and performs the recital with Mari. Omori disappears and a hospitalized Sunny awakes in the real world. He encounters his friends inside Basil's room, and confesses the truth about Mari's death. If the player watered Basil's garden repeatedly in Headspace, an after-credits scene will depict Basil waking up to the sight of Sunny in the hospital. The two smile and their hallucinations disappear.
- Should the player choose not to continue, Sunny disappears rather than Omori. After Omori awakes in White Space and enters Headspace, the scene cuts to Sunny jumping off the hospital's balcony.

If the player ignores Basil on the final day, Sunny and his friends will wake up to discover that he has killed himself. Sunny returns home and, depending on the player's choice, can either kill himself with his knife or move away with his guilt still unabated. This ending also occurs if the player has chosen to remain inside and avoid Kel.

== Development and release ==
Omori was developed over the course of six-and-a-half years, directed by pseudonymous artist Omocat. It is based on Omoriboy (ひきこもり, hikikomori), a webcomic Tumblr blog Omocat created to "help [them] cope with [their] problems during a confusing part of [their] life." Initially planned as a graphic novel, they switched its medium to a video game since they felt it fit the story better, and to enable the audience to make choices during it. For the game engine, they chose RPG Maker, as they deemed it important to support an accessible platform and community.

A Kickstarter campaign was launched in 2014, and was successfully funded within one day, with an initial projected release date of May 2015. A Nintendo 3DS port was promised as a stretch goal, but ultimately never came to fruition due to the discontinuation of the console. Backers were instead offered a Nintendo Switch port. To aid the game's creation, Omocat hired several additional team members, including an RPG Maker expert, but still had a goal of keeping the team size small. Initially, they enlisted their musician friends Space Boyfriend and Slime Girls (Jami Lynne and Pedro Silva, respectively) to help with the soundtrack; after being inspired by Calum Bowen's "My Time" and coming up with the idea of hidden music tracks, they contacted him as well.

Many of Omori's environments were inspired by dreams that Omocat had when they were younger. The imaginary world of Headspace was based on lucid dreaming, and to instill a dreamlike tone, concepts for it were spontaneously devised as it was created. Initially, Headspace was envisioned as a crayon-like world with more experimental gameplay, but this was scrapped due to difficulty designing, testing and programming such a setting. Eventually, Omocat utilized a more unconventional design along these lines for "Black Space".

As development continued, the team had to change their version of the RPG Maker engine, using this opportunity to refine the game's visual style, story, and gameplay. After crowdfunding money was exhausted, they relied on merchandise sales to continue development. Omocat stated that they eventually took a role as lead programmer, sometimes working up to 20 hours a day to ensure the game's release. The game would be delayed into 2019 and early 2020, but would again miss both targets; significant parts of the finale were only implemented months before its release date.

Later in 2020, Omori received its final release date of December 25, when it was released on MacOS and Windows via Steam. Initially available only in English, the Japanese localization was released on December 16, 2021. Following this, the support for Simplified Chinese and Korean languages was added on March 18, 2022.

The Nintendo Switch, PlayStation 4, and Xbox One versions of Omori were first announced during Playism's Tokyo Game Show 2019 presentation on September 11. Playism also announced it would be working on a Japanese release of the game, which was initially planned for 2020, but later delayed. During an Indie World presentation in December 2021, it was announced that a Nintendo Switch version would release in Q2 2022. The Nintendo Switch, Xbox One and Series X/S ports, as well as the new port for Windows 10, were eventually released digitally on June 17, 2022. After a slight delay, the PlayStation 4 port followed on June 24, 2022. These versions were developed by MP2 Games, and feature additional content not found in the original Steam release. The physical edition by Fangamer for Nintendo Switch and PlayStation 4 was initially planned to launch alongside the digital release, but did not launch until early July.

After being removed from Xbox Game Pass at the end of June 2023, Omori was pulled from the Xbox Games Store, stopping further copies of the game being sold. No official statement has been released by Omocat on the matter.

== Reception ==
Reception

Aggregate scores
Aggregator	Score
Metacritic	87/100
OpenCritic	100% recommend

Review scores
Publication	Score
Destructoid	8.5/10
Nintendo Life	8/10
PC Gamer (US)	80/100
RPGFan	90/100

Omori received "generally favorable" reviews according to the review aggregation website Metacritic and 100% of critics recommended the game, according to OpenCritic, with gaming publications praising it for its depiction of anxiety and depression. Rock Paper Shotgun reviewer Kat Bailey compared it to her real-life experiences, stating that the game managed to take overused themes regarding the subject and create a "memorable darkness". Rachel Watts of PC Gamer described it as a work that "captures this sentiment [of overcoming anxiety] masterfully", but criticized some parts of it for being unnecessarily dark. RPGFan writer Alex Franiczek stated that it "succeeded" at depicting harrowing events during a formative part of life, despite it being something that not many games try to attempt.

The game's writing and tone also received praise from many reviewers, who compared it to games such as EarthBound, Undertale, and Yume Nikki, though some criticized its narrative pacing. Stating that the creativity in portions of its narrative made it "truly exceptional", Franiczek described its story as having a "profoundly dark and twisted intimacy". Reviewer Julie Fukunaga of Wired magazine commended the depth and psychological themes of the narrative, stating that "it is in this medium that Omori thrives". Although he considered its narrative pacing to be slow at times, Nintendo Life's Mitch Vogel praised Omori as a game that "makes you think long after you're done with it". In his review for Destructoid, Patrick Hancock criticized the length of the second act, but said that his qualms were "wiped away" by the narrative quality of the finale.

Reviewers' opinion of the game's combat varied. Claiming that the combat was "hardly necessary", Hancock criticized the lack of strategical depth, stating that he "found a strategy that worked and basically just repeated it ad nauseam". Mitch Vogel described its battle mechanics as unique and narratively fitting, but ultimately under-utilized due to a lack of difficulty. Opposingly, Bailey praised the game's "well-executed" combat and "difficult" bosses, stating that they helped break up some of the dungeons. In her review, Rachel Watts complimented the way the game's abilities made the party feel like a cohesive unit.

The art direction also received positive reactions. Watts praised the art direction of the monsters, stating the mix of different art styles "really heightens the horror". The "anime-style cut-ins" were praised by Bailey, who called them "surprisingly well-animated". Despite his criticism of the game's battles, Hancock stated he often anticipated them due to the art style, calling it "nothing short of phenomenal".

=== Awards ===
Omori received two Honorable Mentions at the 2021 Independent Games Festival. It was also nominated for three categories in DreamHack's 2021 "Dreamies" awards, winning the "Daringly Dramatic" prize.

=== Sales ===
In Japan, the Nintendo Switch version of Omori sold 2,903 physical copies within its first week of release, making it the nineteenth bestselling retail game of the week in the country. On December 31, 2022, the game's official Twitter account announced that Omori had sold one million copies.

== Related media ==
Omocat made partnerships with companies for Omori merchandise, such as Nendoroid plastic figures.

=== Manga ===
In November 2023, it was announced that a manga adaptation of the game would be released in Kodansha's seinen manga magazine Monthly Afternoon. Illustrated by Nui Konoito, the manga began serialization on June 25, 2024. Kodansha has collected its chapters into individual tankōbon volumes. The first volume was released on November 21, 2024. As of August 21, 2026, four volumes have been released.

During their panel at Anime Expo 2025, Kodansha USA announced that they had licensed the manga for release in North America. The first volume was released on March 17, 2026.
