= Pikuniku =

2019 video game

- Digital artwork featuring (from up to down, left to right) a Sunshine Inc. robot, a bird, a mountain villager, Mr. Sunshine, Piku, a bird, a fly, Niku, a Sunshine Inc. camera, a rebel, and the worm
- Developer: Sectordub
- Publisher: Devolver Digital
- Designer: Arnaud De Bock
- Programmers: Rémi Forcadell; Alan Zucconi
- Artist: Arnaud De Bock
- Writer: Rémi Forcadell
- Composer: Calum Bowen
- Engine: Unity
- Platforms: Linux; macOS; Windows; Nintendo Switch; Xbox One; Stadia; Android; iOS
- Release: Linux, macOS, Windows, Switch; January 24, 2019; Xbox One; March 12, 2020; Stadia; February 9, 2021; Android, iOS; April 7, 2026
- Genres: Puzzle, adventure
- Modes: Single-player, multiplayer

Pikuniku is an adventure video game developed by French-British indie collective Sectordub and published by Devolver Digital. It was released on January 24, 2019 for Linux, macOS, Nintendo Switch and Microsoft Windows, and was later released on March 12, 2020 for Xbox One and on February 9, 2021 for Stadia. On April 7, 2026, Pikuniku was released for Android and iOS. The game won numerous accolades from 2018 to 2020, including the 2020 Best International Indie Game award at the Pégases Awards.

The game has the player control the titular red creature, Piku, through a colorful world to put an end to a plot to harvest the entirety of the land's resources, and to save the creatures of the island.

A sequel to the game, Pikuniku 2, was announced on June 9, 2026.

== Gameplay ==
=== Single-player ===
Pikuniku is a puzzle and adventure game where the player controls the protagonist Piku through levels and solve puzzles to progress. The majority of puzzles involve kicking and pushing objects onto switches to open doors and access rooms, allowing the player to proceed through the level. Throughout the game, the player encounters villagers, whom they can interact, and spend coin currency earned in the game's levels on items such as hats.

Piku and Niku while rolling

Piku can lasso his legs to swing from hooks and zip lines and curl into a ball and roll. He can also ride on minecarts and go into pipes. These abilities allow the player to move around faster and reach higher or previously inaccessible areas.

=== Co-op ===
The game also features a local co-op mode with 9 levels. The second player controls Niku, an orange creature similar to Piku. Both of the players must cooperate to navigate themselves to a boat at the end of each level.

== Plot ==
The game opens with a commercial in which the character Mr. Sunshine, a pink creature in a top hat, offers to give the island's citizens "free money" in exchange for their "junk" that he collects using his giant robots.

Afterwards, Piku is awakened by a ghost in a cave. The ghost tells him that he needs to leave the cave. After Piku comes out, he discovers that he has been erroneously painted by a legend as an evil beast, and after accidentally breaking the Mountain Village bridge, he is put in a cage by the frightened inhabitants of the village. However, Piku agrees he will fix the bridge, so the villagers decide he is harmless and release him.

Once Piku has earned the townsfolk's trust by fixing the bridge, he explores the area. He talks to the town's troubled painter who drew a non-scary face for a scarecrow around a field of corn. Right after Piku replaces the old one with his drawing, a flying robot comes and sucks up all the corn the townspeople have been growing and scatters free money to placate them. Later, Mr. Sunshine is on another robot and announces that he is going to take a member of the crowd back for a tour of his volcanic base. He chooses a townsperson Eli, who is picked up by the robot and taken away.

Piku then travels through a swamp and reaches a forest, where he finds another robot that is chopping down all the trees. A leaf villager asks Piku to save their friends who are stuck in trees, so Piku helps bring the two leaf villagers down. The three villagers explain to him that the robots made by Mr. Sunshine must be stopped because his robots are actually collecting valuable and essential resources and taking them from the citizens of the island. Piku then follows them into a nightclub where he dance-battles the dance king robot and wins, showing that he is not a spy of Mr. Sunshine. The three forest villagers trust Piku and let him join their group, "the Resistance", against Mr. Sunshine. They show him their base, which is in an abandoned underground metro station that Mr. Sunshine had discontinued long ago. Together, they destroy the tree-chopping robot, saving the forest from destruction.

Following the defeat of the first robot, a villager the Mountain Village comes asking for help from the Resistance, saying that the robot is stealing all of their village's corn. Piku then returns to the town, which is now raining, and with the help of the Resistance, defeats the robot.

When they return to the team base, the Resistance is approached by a worm asking for help because the water in their home dried up. The group suspect Sunshine Inc.'s involvement and decide to help, using the newly reactivated metro system to reach a lake. When they get there, they find that the robots have built a dam and one is sucking up all the water with a straw. The Resistance head underground into the mines to meet the worms.

Mother, a giant worm, recounts how the worms have been suffering due to the lack of the lake's water, which they used to drink and bathe in. She asks them to rescue her child Ernie. Piku goes to search for him and finds that he drank too much of green water from a pipe farther underground from Sunshine Inc. and became too full of the chemical water to move. While transporting Ernie through the cave, Piku discovers a room filled with charred bodies of creatures that resemble Mr. Sunshine, and the worm reveals they were killed by an erupting volcano after mining too close to it. Once Ernie is brought back to his mother, the worms assist Piku in destroying Mr. Sunshine's last robot. After that, Mr. Sunshine, angry from the destruction of his robots, comes in his flying robot and picks Piku up. He captures Piku by bringing him to the Sunshine Inc. headquarters in the volcano.

The final portion of the game takes place inside Mr. Sunshine's base inside of the volcano where Piku is held prisoner. With the help of the worm stealing the key from the guard robot, Piku escapes. Soon after, it is revealed that Mr. Sunshine's plot is to destroy the surrounding land by covering it with lava in order to establish a new city populated with "perfect" inhabitants called Sunshiners, which are made by splicing people together. Mr. Sunshine was testing Eli, who was actually captured from Mr. Sunshine, and another leaf villager. Piku frees them from capture and a Sunshiner robot suddenly appears, though is unable to move or communicate that well.

After leaving the lab, Piku reaches a pit over live magma where he avoids Mr. Sunshine's robot's lasers until his robotic henchmen piloting it go on a strike after discovering they aren't equally paid. From a helicopter, Ernie drops by rolling into the pit and lets Piku use his body as a platform to jump out of it. Piku chases Mr. Sunshine over the magma, avoiding popcorn launched from the latter's motorboat. Upon arriving at a dead end, Mr. Sunshine presses a button that makes the volcano erupt, but the lava is so unexpectedly powerful that they are both ejected into the atmosphere on a platform of rock.

Piku then kicks Mr. Sunshine into space. After he does so, the ghost from the cave returns and reveals themself as a mysterious being as they inform Piku of his mission's outcome before sending him back into the Sunshine base where the Resistance are. Piku leaves along with the other Resistance members, and wakes up back in the cave.

After the story's events, the player can explore an altered post-game world where everything is restored and going well for the citizens of the island.

== Development ==
Consisting of four staff members, Sectordub is a collaborative studio composed of Arnaud De Bock, Rémi Forcadell, Alan Zucconi, and Calum Bowen. The game was published by Devolver Digital.

The beta version of Pikuniku was revealed during development in 2017. However, the version of the game was not published, and the final game had gone through various changes on release.

The final version launched for Linux, macOS, Windows, and Nintendo Switch on January 24, 2019, Xbox One on March 12, 2020, Stadia on February 9, 2021, and Android and iOS on April 7, 2026.

The game was released under the name "Pikuniku" (ピクニック, Pikunikku), which means "picnic" in Japanese.

== Soundtrack ==
Pikuniku (Original Soundtrack)
- Soundtrack cover art by Charlotte Mei

Soundtrack album by Bo En
- Released: January 24, 2019
- Genre: Instrumental
- Length: 1:14:24
- Label: Bo Entertainment

=== Composition ===
The Pikuniku (Original Soundtrack) has been described as "funny and lighthearted", and having the same "light touch" as the game. It is praised for fitting with the different environments of Pikuniku all the way to the game's conclusion.

=== Track listing ===
All tracks appear in the single-player game, unless otherwise noted.

All music is composed by Bo En.

No.	Title	Appears in	Length
1.	"Introducing Pikuniku (Trailer 1)"	Trailer	0:45
2.	"Introducing Pikuniku (Trailer 2)"	Trailer	0:48
3.	"Wake Up (Trailer 3)"	Trailer	0:59
4.	"Welcome"	Main menu	1:14
5.	"Free Money"		0:51
6.	"The Cave"		1:45
7.	"The Sun Is Shining"		1:31
8.	"Locked Up"		0:55
9.	"The Mountain Village"		2:43
10.	"The Artist's House"		1:00
11.	"The Shop"		0:50
12.	"Baskick"		1:46
13.	"The Mountain Temple"		2:56
14.	"The Swamp"		2:13
15.	"The Forest"		2:02
16.	"Sam's Pottery"		0:45
17.	"The Forest Town"		3:12
18.	"The Club"		0:53
19.	"King of the Dancefloor"		1:05
20.	"El Bunko"		1:31
21.	"Pinecone Power!"		1:56
22.	"Toastopia"		1:42
23.	"Frog Temple"		2:40
24.	"The Rainy Mountain"		2:15
25.	"Run!"		1:46
26.	"Enter the Mine"		0:50
27.	"Underground Friends"		1:56
28.	"Mother's Lullaby"		1:14
29.	"Help Ernie"		1:16
30.	"Don't Fall!"		2:37
31.	"Infiltrating Sunshine HQ"		2:07
32.	"Take on Mr. Sunshine!"		2:44
33.	"An Old Friend (The Green Box)"		0:55
34.	"Everything's Gonna Be Okay"	During end-game credits	1:58
35.	"The Crate (Co-op 1)"	Co-op only	2:34
36.	"Geysers (Co-op 2)"	Co-op only	2:03
37.	"Desert Race (Co-op 3)"	Co-op only	1:29
38.	"Rope Fall (Co-op 4)"	Co-op only	3:28
39.	"The Spikes (Co-op 5)"	Co-op only	1:13
40.	"The Maze (Co-op 6)"	Co-op only	3:21
41.	"Samba Race (Co-op 7)"	Co-op only	1:29
42.	"Balloons in the Desert (Co-op 8)"	Co-op, also appears in single-player game at the Lake	1:52
43.	"Rotation (Co-op 9)"	Co-op only	0:53
44.	"Trophies"		0:48
45.	"Bonus Unused Trailer Demo"	Trailer (unused)	0:22
Total length:			1:14:24

== Reception ==
Reception

Aggregate score
Aggregator	Score
Metacritic	NS: 76/100; PC: 74/100

Review scores
Publication	Score
Destructoid	8/10
GameRevolution	8/10
GameSpot	8/10
Jeuxvideo.com	14/20
Nintendo Life	8/10
Nintendo World Report	8.5/10
PC Gamer (UK)	79/100

Pikuniku received "generally favorable reviews" on the Nintendo Switch and "mixed or average reviews" on the PC version of the game, according to review aggregator Metacritic.

Jeuxvideo.com stated that the game was "very short (less than 5 hours of play)" though having "a pretty good mix of platforming and puzzle". Pikuniku was given the rating 14/20.

Nintendo Life gave Pikuniku 8/10 stars ("great"), saying "It's a short game, but one packed with heart and imagination, with a great single-player component and excellent couch co-op that can genuinely be enjoyed by anyone".

Destructoid said, "It's a simple game with a ton of heart that'll leave you beaming when everything's said and done", giving Pikuniku a 8/10 ("great").

GameRevolution gave Pikuniku a 8/10 saying, "[It] is an odd game, yes, but it is a fun, relaxing one to boot. There are few better ways to spend an afternoon than in its colorful, quirky world".

GameSpot said that Pikuniku is "extremely charming and funny throughout, gameplay is consistently entertaining, and exploration and curiosity are rewarded". They also said that "[i]t's very short, and by the end I wanted more, occasional frustrations with kicking", giving Pikuniku a 8/10.

Nintendo World Report gave Pikuniku a 8.5/10 saying it was "easy to pick up and play" though "could stand to have a little more content".

PC Gamer (UK) gave Pikuniku a 79/100 saying it is a "wonderfully absurd tale of insurrection and kicking stuff in a cheery-looking world".

Eurogamer praised Pikuniku for its imaginative world, quirky humor, and inventive puzzle design, describing it as a genuinely funny and charming experience, while noting its short length and relatively low difficulty.

=== Accolades ===
The game achieved multiple nominations and selections.

Year	Organization	Award	Ref.
2018	XOXO Festival	Official selection	
2018	PAX East Indie Megabooth	Official selection	
2019	Independent Games Festival (IGF)	"Excellent in Audio"	
2019	The Innovation Games Award		
2020	Pégases Awards	"Best International Indie Game"	

== Sequel ==
A sequel, titled Pikuniku 2, was announced on June 9, 2026. It is rendered in 3D, and is expected to be released in 2027.
