= Yuna Taniguchi =

Japanese voice actress

- 谷口 夢奈
- Born: August 17, 1994 (age 31); Osaka Prefecture, Japan
- Status: Active
- Occupation: Voice actress
- Years active: 2014–present
- Agent: Arts Vision
- Notable work: Robot Girls Z as Gromazen R9; Ahiru no Sora as Nao Nanao

Yuna Taniguchi (谷口 夢奈, Taniguchi Yuna; born August 17, 1994) is a Japanese voice actress from Osaka Prefecture who is currently affiliated with Arts Vision.

== Biography ==
Taniguchi was born on August 17, 1994, in Osaka Prefecture. Taniguchi dreaming of becoming a voice actress, she once told her mother that she wanted to attend a high school where she could study acting. Her mother, however, suggested she go to a regular academic high school instead. During her first year of high school, while considering attending a specialized school after graduation, a classmate told her about a training school that even high school students could attend. Inspired, Taniguchi joined the Japan Narration Acting Institute during her second year of high school, managing to balance her regular studies with voice acting training. After completing the basic course, Taniguchi passed the in-house audition and officially joined Arts Vision. Taniguchi also has a nickname, "Poyo," which was given to her by Asami Shimoda, a fellow voice actress at the same agency.

In January 2014, Taniguchi made her debut as Gromazen R9 in Robot Girls Z. Later, in 2019, she landed her first lead role in a TV anime, playing Nao Nanao in Ahiru no Sora.

== Filmography ==
=== Anime television series ===
2014

- Shima Jiro no Wao, Robot
- Robot Girls Z, Groma Zen R9
- Black Butler, Orange-Selling Girl
- Wolf Girl and Black Prince, Female Student, Family Restaurant Waitress, Female Customer

2015

- Death Parade, Mai Takada (young)

2016

- Doraemon, Waitress

2017

- Action Heroine Cheer Fruits, Momohime
- The Idolmaster SideM, Female
- Code: Realize, Etty

2018

- Gundam Build Divers, Mass Diver
- Happy Sugar Life, Reika Oboroki

2019

- Circlet Princess, Hiyori Sugiura
- Ahiru no Sora, Nao Nanao

2021

- Those Snow White Notes, Sakura Yamano
- Fushigi Dagashiya Zenitendō, Classmate

2022

- She Professed Herself Pupil of the Wise Man, Eurika
- A Couple of Cuckoos, Classmate A and Classmate B
- Puniruns, Yuka
- Idolish7, Classmate B

2023

- Yowamushi Pedal: Limit Break, Audience Member
- Urusei Yatsura, High School Girl
- Alice Gear Aegis, Momoka Shimochi

2026

- You and I Are Polar Opposites, Watanabe

=== Anime films ===
2015

- Typhoon Noruda as Yowamushi

2019

- The Alchemist Code Movie as Amane

2020

- Digimon Adventure as Morphomon

=== OVA ===
2021

- Alice Gear Aegis: Mermaid Grand Prix as Momoka Shimochi

=== Video games ===
2014

- Lineage II as Nikita
- Robot Girls Z Online as Groma Zen R9
- Synthetic RPG: Nina the Witch and Clay Warriors as Epica, Aisha

2015

- Dynasty Warriors 7: Empires
- Millennium War Aigis as Various Characters
- Psychedelica of the Black Butterfly and the Ashen Hawk as Takuya, the masked girl
- White Cat Project as Mireille Lerner, Penta, and Micha

2016

- Soul Worker as Enoch
- Quiz RPG: The World of Mystic Wiz as Sitri Media Sinocha
- Trickster Online as Ling Xiao

2018

- Alice Gear Aegis as Shimo-Ochiai Momoka
- Onsen Musume as Nanako Tamasaki
- Lost Trigger as Aisha

2019

- Nora, Princess, and Stray Cat as Orca

2020

- Monster Hunter Riders as Nargathair and Ciel

2021

- Samurai Shodown as Cham Cham

2023

- Gal Guardians: Demon Purge as Nanako Tamasaki
- Etoha Hana! Zodiac Girls Hanafuda Battle as Mari Inosaka

2024

- Cardoanshel as Nanako Tamasaki

=== Digital Comics ===
- My Hero Academia as Izuku Midoriya (young)
- Uso Tsuki Kishi to Yumi Migusa as Rūna and Riria
- RIRIA – Densetsu no Kaseifu- as Riria Yaotome
