= Lovely Planet =

2014 video game

- Developer: Quicktequila
- Publisher: tinyBuild
- Designer: Vidhvat Madan
- Programmer: Vidhvat Madan
- Composer: Calum Bowen
- Engine: Unity
- Platforms: Microsoft Windows; OS X Linux; Xbox One; PlayStation 4 Wii U
- Release: Windows, OS X, Linux: WW: July 31, 2014; Xbox One: WW: January 8, 2016; PlayStation 4: WW: April 5, 2016; Wii U: NA: April 5, 2016; EU: April 7, 2016
- Genres: First-person shooter, platform
- Mode: Single-player

Lovely Planet is a first-person shooter platform video game developed by Indian indie developer Quicktequila and published by tinyBuild. It was released for Microsoft Windows, OS X and Linux in July 2014, for Xbox One in January 2016, and the PlayStation 4 and Wii U in April 2016.

The game received mixed reviews from critics, with praise given to its visuals and soundtrack, but criticism for its presentation and level of difficulty.

== Gameplay ==
A level in Lovely Planet

The game is a speedrunning focused first-person shooter where the player must complete the level as fast as possible to progress. There is no plot, but rather "micro-levels" contained within larger areas. Being hit by a bullet, falling, or touching enemies causes the player to die instantly, and the player must memorize the levels to win.

The player's gun does not have an aiming reticle, and bullets move slowly, forcing the player to lead their shots. Players can earn up to 3 stars depending on how fast they beat a level, with the third star requiring perfect accuracy.

Certain level hazards also force the player forward, for example, apples that must be shot out of the sky or they will kill the player when they reach the ground.

== Development ==
The game's art style and music has been compared by several critics to Katamari Damacy. Andras Neltz of Kotaku found the dissonance between the game's graphics, music and shooting mechanics to be "unsettling".

== Reception ==
The game received mixed reception, according to review aggregator Metacritic.

Tyler Wilde of PC Gamer rated the game 82/100, calling the gameplay "great" despite being "merciless", but saying the presentation was "mediocre", as it was too "abstract" to be appealing.

Tim Latshaw of Nintendo Life rated the Wii U version 6/10, comparing the contrast between its "cute" graphics and "technical" mechanics "like opening a Hello Kitty backpack and finding nuclear launch codes within". He stated that while "dedicated speedrunners" would enjoy it, its appeal was otherwise "limited".

James Cunningham of Hardcore Gamer rated the game a 2/5, saying that the necessity for extremely precise gameplay "leech[ed] the joy out of the action".

== Sequels ==
Two sequels were created following the game's release, Lovely Planet Arcade, a more puzzle-oriented first-person shooter, which released on July 22, 2016, and Super Lovely Planet, a third-person platformer in which the player controls a bouncing ball without any attacks, which released on July 28, 2017. Another sequel, entitled Lovely Planet 2: April Skies, was released on June 18, 2019. A third game in the series, Lovely Planet Remix, was released on November 12, 2021.
