= Robot Girls Z =

Japanese anime television series

- Cover of the first DVD volume published by Toei

ロボットガールズZ (Robotto Gāruzu Zetto)
- Genre: Comedy, magical girl, mecha, parody
- Created by: Dynamic Planning
- Anime television series
- Directed by: Hiroshi Ikehata
- Produced by: Yoshihide Moriyama
- Written by: Kazuho Hyodo
- Studio: Toei Animation
- Licensed by: Crunchyroll
- Original run: January 4, 2014 – March 2, 2014
- Episodes: 9
- Original net animation

Robot Girls Z+
- Directed by: Hiroshi Ikehata
- Produced by: Yoshihide Moriyama
- Written by: Kazuho Hyodo
- Studio: Toei Animation
- Released: May 20, 2015 – October 2, 2015
- Episodes: 6

Robot Girls Z (Japanese: ロボットガールズZ, Hepburn: Robotto Gāruzu Zetto) is an anime television series created by Dynamic Planning and animated by Toei Animation. The series is a comedic parody of various mecha series produced by Toei, anthropomorphizing robots from those series into magical girls. The series aired on the Toei Channel between January 4, 2014, and March 2, 2014, and was simulcast by Crunchyroll. A preview was streamed on YouTube on October 18, 2013. The opening theme is "Robot Girls Z" (ロボットガールズZ) by Kikai♡Shoujotai (Mariko Honda, Inori Minase, Kazusa Aranami, Maaya Uchida, and Minami Tsuda), whilst the ending theme is "Team Z's Power" (チームZのチカラ, Chīmu Zetto no Chikara) by Robot Girls Team Z (Honda, Minase, and Aranami).

== Characters ==
=== Robot Girls ===
==== Team Z ====
Mazinger Z (マジンガーZ) / Z-chan (Zちゃん, Zetto-chan)
Voiced by: Mariko Honda
The leader of Team Z. Z-chan is hotblooded and impulsive usually destroying city blocks while paying no mind to the destruction she causes. She is often called a kid with strong athletic abilities by Gre-chan due to this. However Z-chan likes to fight evil, while causing a bit more mayhem than her enemies do and having little interest in justice.
Great Mazinger (グレートマジンガー) / Gre-chan (グレちゃん, Gure-chan)
Voiced by: Inori Minase
The youngest member of the team. Compared to her teammates, she speaks very little and is rather cynical, quite often judging others for their flaws, including Z-chan who she calls a "kid" despite Z-chan being a little older than her. She always says she dislikes athletic girls, particularly Z-chan. Despite the harsh treatment she gives Z-chan, Gre-chan appears to actually like her as she expressed some concern when Minerva X appeared to be around Z-chan and started to cry when Z-chan said she hated her. She is often seen holding something in her hands such as a digital camera or a portable gaming system.
Grendizer (グレンダイザー) / Grenda-san (グレンダさん, Gurenda-san)
Voiced by: Kazusa Aranami
Grenda-san is the more sophisticated member of her team and is generally friendly and unfussy. However, she has a sadistic side where she has thoughts of punishing people in embarrassing ways. Grenda-san is a big fan Rhine X especially of Rhine X1 and did everything she could to avoid listening to the singing of Belgas V5 out of personal preference.

==== Team G ====
Getter Robo (ゲッターロボ) / Get-chan (ゲっちゃん)
Voiced by: Maaya Uchida
Steel Jeeg (鋼鉄ジーグ) / Jeeg-san (ジーグさん, Jīgu-san)
Voiced by: Minami Tsuda

==== Team T ====
Gaiking (ガイキング) / Gai-chan (ガイちゃん)
Voiced by: Kaori Takaoka

Has a personality similar to Z-Chan's.

Gakeen (ガ・キーン) / Gacky (ガッキー, Gakkī)
Voiced by: Satomi Satō
Barattack (バラタック) / Bara-tan (バラたん)
Voiced by: Ayumi Tsuji

Acts like a bratty little girl

Danguard Ace (ダンガードA) / DanDan (ダンダン)
Voiced by: Chiharu Kitaoka

A shy and caring girl

=== Underground Empire ===
Dr. Hell (Dr.ヘル, Dokutā Heru)
Voiced by: Bin Shimada
Leader of the Underground Empire and creator of the Mechanical Beasts Girls, who only appears as a pair of eyes on a screen.
Baron Ashura (あしゅら男爵, Ashura Danshaku)
Voiced by: Aya Hisakawa
Ashura is a loyal member of the Underground Empire, serving Dr. Hell in his quest for world domination and following his command to get what they need in order to achieve that goal. She acts similar to an older sister to the Mechanical Beast Girls and looks out for them, once even ignoring a message from Dr. Hell to look after Doublas M2. . Her appearance is split, one side male, the other side female.
Doublas M2 (ダブラスM2)
Voiced by: Nao Tōyama
Doublas has the speech and mannerisms of a shy little girl that gets scared when defeated badly. While capable of speaking in a regular fashion, Doublas prefers to speak through her handpuppets and becomes insecure without them.
Garada K7 (ガラダK7)
Voiced by: Yukiko Morishita
Garada is a tomboy who likes to fight, but she has a weak spirit as shown when she and Doublas break down after their humiliating defeat at the hand of the Robot Girls.
Gromazen R9 (グロマゼンR9)
Voiced by: Yuna Taniguchi
Gromazen R9 is a hardworking and peppy young girl, yet gets down on herself hard when she fails miserably at something as she considered suicide after a branch of failures against the Robot Girls.
Gaia Q5 (ガイアQ5)
Voiced by: Momoko Matsui
Gaia has the mannerisms of an overly detailed nerd when speaking about her magnetic abilities. She is able to make a comeback after a misunderstanding but gets down on herself rather easily after her own abilities turn on her.
Kingdan X10 (キングダンX10)
Voiced by: Saori Gotō
Kingdan is very shy and panics rather easily in a manner similar to stage fright. She is also very apologetic for her weakness.
Balanger M2 (バランガM2)
Voiced by: Saki Hatanaka
Baranga is a ditzy masochist who received sexual pleasure when she is hurt or bound. She first appears as a giant sea urchin.
Grossam X2 (グロッサムX2)
Voiced by: Kanako Miyamoto
Glossam has a snobbish attitude with a short-temper and verbally abuses others whether ally or enemy, calling Baron Ashura 'granny' for example.
Poses O2 (ポセスO2)
Voiced by: Aya Suzaki
Poses first appears as a giant seahorse and is loyal to her creator and his ideals for world domination, she dislikes being ignored which happens quite a lot. She tends to end her sentences with '-kro'.
Minerva X (ミネルバX)
Voiced by: Mika Kikuchi
An Underground Empire spy who is actually a crossdressing boy. Minerva has a crush on Z-chan and strives to get her attention. When it comes to others however such as the other members of team Z, he badmouths them and considers them unworthy of Z-chan's attention especially Gre-chan.
Belgas V5 (ベルガスV5)
Voiced by: Hibiku Yamamura
Belgas has a good singing voice that can entrance others and make them experience mood swings. But when this fails, she sings in a destructive sound.

=== Others ===
Rhine X1 (ラインX1) / Lorelai Yoko (ローレライようこ, Rōrerai Yōko)
Voiced by: Shizuka Furuya
A former idol singer and member of Rhine X, who now runs a Resort. Yoko is a good natured person, who is generally friendly and polite, but can be merciless when she needs to be, especially when someone is threatening her resort. Her voice causes destructive sound waves.
The Great General of Darkness-ko (暗黒大将軍子, Ankoku-daishōgun-ko) / Emperor of Darkness (闇の帝王, Yami no Teiō) / Mycenae-tan (ミケーネたん, Mikēne-tan)
Voiced by: Yukari Tamura
Archduke Gorgon (ゴーゴン大公, Gōgon-taikō)
Voiced by: Ai Nonaka
General Juuma (獣魔将軍, Jūma-shōgun)
Voiced by: Ayano Yamamoto

== Episodes ==
=== Robot Girls Z (2014) ===
No.	Title	Original release date
1–03	"Kyōi! Robottogāruzu Z" (驚異！ロボットガールズZ) "Kyōfu! Chika teikoku no jijō" (恐怖！地下帝国の事情) "Shōgeki! Numazu okidai kessen" (衝撃！沼津沖大決戦)	January 4, 2014
The Robot Girls Z; Z-chan, Gre-chan, and Grenda-san, protect Photonic City from the threat of Baron Ashura and her Underground Empire of Mechanical Beast Girls, usually destroying the town in the process. Ashura's boss, Dr. Hell, creates more Mechanical Beast Girls to fight against the Robot Girls, but each attempt results in favor. Later, the Robot Girls are attacked whilst helping out on a fishing boat.
4–06	"Kyōen! Robottogāruzu dai undōkai" (競演！ロボットガールズ大運動会) "Konwaku!? Nazo no bishōjo tōjō" (困惑！？謎の美少女登場) "Yukemuri ♡ Onsen dai sakusen" (湯けむり ♡ 温泉大作戦)	February 1, 2014
Team Z are challenged to an athletics showdown by Team T to determine who should be the city's protectors. Later, Ashura uses a disguised Mechanical Beast Girl named Minerva X to try and disrupt the Team Z's teamwork by getting close to Z-chan. Afterwards, whilst relaxing at a hot spring, the girls meet idol Youko Lorelei, whose performance is interrupted by the Underground Empire's Mechanical Beast Girl, Belgas V5, causing whoever listens to it to become drunk with good feelings.
7–09	"Gekitō! Ashura danshaku no gyakushū" (激闘！あしゅら男爵の逆襲) "Shokku! Kōshi-ryoku machi saigo no hi!" (ショック！光子力町最期の日！) "Robottogāruzu Z! Akatsuki ni shisu!!" (ロボットガールズZ！暁に死す！！)	March 2, 2014
As Ashura finds herself unemployed after being laid off by Dr. Hell, Doublas and Garada are given a giant robot by a mysterious stranger to allow Ashura to have a final battle against Team Z. Although the mech completely overwhelms the girls, it turns out to be running on a trial version, which soon leads to its defeat. Later, a new enemy known as The Great General of Darkness-ko appears and steals the city's photonic energy, bringing it to its destructions and completely overwhelming Team Z. They are aided by the arrival of Team G, Steel Jeeg and Getter Robo, along with all their other allies, but are still overpowered by Darkness-ko. However, thanks to Ashura exposing her weakpoint, Z-chan manages to pull apart Darkness-ko's suit and expose the true mastermind, Mycenae-tan, who is swiftly dealt with.

=== Robot Girls Z Specials (2014) ===
Unaired special episodes 3.5, 6.5, and 9.5 included with the Blu-ray/DVD releases.

No.	Title	Original release date
3.5	"Incandescence! The Great Battle of the Galaxy" "Hakunetsu! Ginga dai sensō" (白熱！ 銀河大戦争)	June 13, 2014
6.5	"Assault! Three part challenge for the Robot Girls" "Totsugeki! Robotto Gāruzu Sanban Shōbu" (突撃！ロボットガールズ三番勝負)	2014
9.5	"Shivering! The Power of the Net" "Senritsu! Netto no chikara" (戦慄！ネットの力)	August 8, 2014

=== Robot Girls Z Plus (2015) ===
No.	Title	Original release date
1	"Here We Are! Robot Girls Z" "Omatase! Robotto Gāruzu Z" (お待たせ！ロボットガールズZ)	May 20, 2015
As Z-Chan's rival, Boss, tries to become a member of Team Z, the team come under attack from the enemy robot girl, Bong-chan, but are soon assisted by the new and improved Team G.
2	"Great Peril! Team G is Shocked!" "Kyōgaku! Chīmu G, Dai Pinchi!" (驚愕!チームG、大ピンチ!)	June 19, 2015
Team G struggle against the sky magical Grangen's tentacles, but eventually manage to stop her thanks to inadvertent help from Boss.
3	"Decision! Best robot girls" "Kettei! Saikyō Robotto Gāruzu" (決定！ 最強ロボットガールズ)	July 20, 2015
4	"Advance!! Girls corps!" "Shingeki!! Gāruzu gundan!" (進撃！！ガールズ軍団！)	August 20, 2015
5	"Naturally dismayed! Nerima banishment?" "Azen bōzen! Nerima tsuihō?!" (あ然呆然！ 練馬追放？！)	September 20, 2015
6	"Unbeatable! Team Z New Power!" "Muteki! Chīmu Z Nyū Pawā!" (敵！ チームZニューパワー！)	October 20, 2015

== Media ==
=== Games ===
A browser-based multiplayer PC game titled Robot Girls Z Online has been announced. Robot Girls Z will also have cameo appearances within the PlayStation Vita game Ar Nosurge Plus.
