= You and I Are Polar Opposites =

Japanese manga series by Kōcha Agasawa

- First tankōbon volume cover, featuring Yuusuke Tani (left) and Miyu Suzuki (right)

正反対な君と僕 (Seihantai na Kimi to Boku)
- Genre: Romantic comedy
- Manga
- Written by: Kōcha Agasawa
- Published by: Shueisha
- English publisher: NA: Viz Media
- Imprint: Jump Comics+
- Magazine: Shōnen Jump+
- Original run: May 2, 2022 – November 25, 2024
- Volumes: 8
- Anime television series
- Directed by: Takayoshi Nagatomo
- Produced by: Fumi Teranishi; Wataru Tanaka; Yuri Kondou; Kei Takamoto
- Written by: Teruko Utsumi
- Music by: Tofubeats
- Studio: Lapin Track
- Licensed by: Crunchyroll: SA/SEA: Medialink
- Original network: JNN (MBS, TBS)
- Original run: January 11, 2026 – October 4, 2026
- Episodes: 25
- icon

You and I Are Polar Opposites (Japanese: 正反対な君と僕, Hepburn: Seihantai na Kimi to Boku) is a Japanese web manga series created by Kōcha Agasawa. It was serialized on Shueisha's Shōnen Jump+ app and website from May 2022 to November 2024, with its chapters collected in eight tankōbon volumes.

The series follows Miyu Suzuki, an outgoing high school girl, and her relationship with her crush Yusuke Tani, an introverted boy, while also drawing focus on their group of friends and their respective relationships.

The first season of an anime television series adaptation produced by Lapin Track aired from January to March 2026. The second and final season aired from July to October of the same year.

== Plot ==
Miyu Suzuki and Yusuke Tani are two high school students who are polar opposites of each other—Suzuki is an energetic and outgoing girl who tends to follow the crowd, even when she does not feel like doing so, while Tani is a quiet and introverted boy who bluntly speaks his mind. Because of this, Suzuki fell head over heels in love with Tani the moment she saw him for the first time, but is unable to really make her feelings known to him, and is unaware that Tani also has a crush on her. After she confesses her love to him, he reciprocates and the story follows Suzuki and Tani in their developing relationship, as well as their friends' issues.

== Characters ==
Miyu Suzuki (鈴木 みゆ, Suzuki Miyu)
Voiced by: Yū Sasahara (PV), Sayumi Suzushiro (anime) (Japanese); Celeste Perez (English)
A gyaru who has pink hair and painted nails. She has an outgoing personality, going out of her way to please the people around her, even though sometimes she finds it exhausting. She sits next to Tani, whom she fell head over heels in love with at first sight, but is shy about her feelings. Tani eventually returns her feelings and the two later start dating, even continuing their relationship after Tani leaves their hometown.
Yusuke Tani (谷 悠介, Tani Yūsuke)
Voiced by: Yūto Uemura (PV), Shogo Sakata (anime) (Japanese); Brandon Acosta (English)
A glasses-wearing loner student who sits next to Suzuki. He has a quiet personality but is honest when he does speak, contrasting with Suzuki's more outgoing and friendly personality. The two eventually start dating. He aims to become a teacher. At the end of the series, he is accepted at a university and moves away, with him and Suzuki planning to have a long-distance relationship.
Kentaro Yamada (山田 健太郎, Yamada Kentarō)
Voiced by: Anji Iwata (Japanese); Van Barr Jr. (English)
One of Suzuki's best friends, whom she has known since middle school. Known for his quirky and airheaded demeanor, he often asks Tani for homework and touts having a friend named "Gapacho" that no one else ever sees. He is drawn to seeing people laugh who he would not expect to see laugh, which draws him to Nishi, eventually leading to them dating.
Natsumi Nishi (西 奈津美, Nishi Natsumi)
Voiced by: Kokoro Ōmori (Japanese); Rebecca Danae (English)
A kind but extremely shy girl from another class who volunteers at the library with Tani. She has a habit of finding the antics of the other characters hilarious, but often muffles her laughter out of embarrassment. In contrast to Yamada's dimwittedness, Nishi overthinks everything regarding conversations, leaving her with social anxiety. Despite her insecurities, she slowly builds confidence and eventually starts dating Yamada.
Shuji Taira (平 秀司, Taira Shūji)
Voiced by: Wataru Katoh (Japanese); Mauricio Ortiz-Segura (English)
A cynical and self-deprecating student with a downer demeanor, who works part-time at a nearby convenience store. He is highly self-conscious and views everyone as being on a social hierarchy. He and Azuma are from the same middle school, and the two develop a budding relationship from the positive impact they have on each other. With time, he starts to realize Azuma has fallen head over heels in love with him, but due to his past failed relationship, his insecurities and him being terrified of rejection, he decides not to reciprocate and just remain friends with her.
Shino Azuma (東 紫乃, Azuma Shino)
Voiced by: Miyuri Shimabukuro (Japanese); Sarah Roach (English)
A friendly girl who often overthinks looking cool in front of others, leading to incredibly low self-confidence. Her past romantic situations usually took a turn with the boy being a bad person, leaving her somewhat jaded. She and Taira are from the same middle school, and the two develop a budding relationship from the positive impact they have on each other. She slowly begins to fall head over heels in love with Taira, but it appears to be one-sided as Taira's feelings for her are platonic. Realizing this, Azuma is heartbroken, but she decides to brush her feelings aside and just remain friends with him.
Aoi Sato (佐藤 葵, Satō Aoi)
Voiced by: Konatsu Hirabayashi (Japanese); Cassie Ewulu (English)
One of Suzuki's best friends whom she has known since middle school along with Yamada, and was in her first year class. She tends to be a more serious member of the group, second only to Tani.
Manami Watanabe (渡辺 真奈美, Watanabe Manami)
Voiced by: Yuna Taniguchi (Japanese); Hannah Alyea (English)
One of Suzuki's best friends whom she met in their first year. She is incredibly lively and mischievous, while also being airheaded like Yamada.
Rikako Honda (本田 梨花子, Honda Rikako)
Voiced by: Tomori Kusunoki (Japanese); Cheyenne Haynes (Note: Marisa Duran filled in for Haynes as Honda in episode 20) (English)
Nishi's best friend who is in the same class as her. She has a habit of sucking in her lips to keep herself from smiling. Despite being kind to her friends, and viewed as incredibly beautiful by Suzuki, Honda has a general disdain towards people she has not met or who get on her nerves. She and Yamada were in the same class the previous year, and thus helps facilitate his and Nishi's relationship.

== Media ==
=== Manga ===
Written and illustrated by Kōcha Agasawa, You and I Are Polar Opposites was initially a one-shot published on Shueisha's Shōnen Jump+ app and website on January 7, 2021. It was serialized in the same website from May 2, 2022, to November 25, 2024. Eight tankōbon volumes were published from July 2022 to March 2025.

In June 2022, Shueisha began releasing the series in English on its Manga Plus platform. In October 2023, Viz Media announced that it licensed the series for English publication.

==== Volumes ====
No.	Original release date	Original ISBN	English release date	English ISBN
1	July 4, 2022	978-4-08-883125-1	May 7, 2024	978-1-9747-4376-6
1. "Suzuki and Tani" (鈴木と谷, Suzuki to Tani); 2. "From Tani to Suzuki" (谷から鈴木へ, Tani kara Suzuki e); 3. "First Date!" (初デート！, Hatsu Dēto!); 4. "Hierarchy" (ヒエラルキー, Hierarukī); 5. "'Cute'" (「可愛い」, "Kawaii"); 6. "Study Session" (勉強会°, Benkyōkai°)
2	October 4, 2022	978-4-08-883275-3	August 6, 2024	978-1-9747-4639-2
7. "A Summer Night and a Convenience Store" (夏の夜とコンビニと, Natsu no Yoru to Konbini to); 8. "Festival Time" (祭りだ祭りだ, Matsuri da Matsuri da); 9. "Latent Desires" (潜在的願望, Senzai-teki Ganbō); 10. "An Unconscious Weakness" (無自覚な癖, Mujikaku na Heki); 11. "Summer Break!" (夏休み！, Natsuyasumi!); 12. "Everyone's This and That" (それぞれいろいろ, Sorezore Iroiro); 13. "Culture Festival (1)" (文化祭1, Bunkasai 1); 14. "Culture Festival (2)" (文化祭2, Bunkasai 2)
3	March 3, 2023	978-4-08-883395-8	November 5, 2024	978-1-9747-4938-6
15. "After the Festival" (祭りのあと, Matsuri no Ato); 16. "Suzuki's Room and Autumn Rain" (部屋と秋時雨, Heya to Aki Shigure); 17. "Pitter-Patter" (ドキドキ, Dokidoki); 18. "Uneasy Feelings" (モヤモヤ, Moyamoya); 19. "Photo Op" (シャッターチャンス, Shattā Chansu); 20. "A Forgiving Girl" (許す女, Yurusu On'na); 21. "Surprise!" (サプライズ！, Sapuraizu!); 22. "Planning!" (プランニング！, Puranningu!)
4	July 4, 2023	978-4-08-883630-0	February 4, 2025	978-1-9747-5202-7
23. "Focus" (意識, Ishiki); 24. "Silent Restraint" (サイレント遠慮, Sairento Enryo); 25. "Field Trip (1)" (修学旅行1, Shūgakuryokō 1); 26. "Field Trip (2)" (修学旅行2, Shūgakuryokō 2); 27. "Field Trip (3)" (修学旅行3, Shūgakuryokō 3); 28. "Field Trip (4)" (修学旅行4, Shūgakuryokō 4); 29. "Step by Step" (ほいっぽ, Hoippo); 30. "Green Light" (青信号, Aoshingō); 31. "A Date That's a Bit Too Mature?" (背伸びデート？, Senobi Dēto?)
5	November 2, 2023	978-4-08-883697-3	May 6, 2025	978-1-9747-5482-3
32. "Sudden Interaction" (ファスト交流, Fasuto Kōryū); 33. "A Sensitive Junction" (多感ジャンクション, Takan Jankushon); 34. "Christmas Eve" (クリスマスイブ, Kurisumasu Ibu); 35. "Clown" (ピエロ, Piero); 36. "Sharing Poetic Sentiments" (詩情シェア, Shijō Shea); 37. "Someone Started Thinking" (考え始めた人, Kangae Hajimeta Hito); 38. "New Year's Eve" (大晦日, Ōmisoka); 39. "New Year's Day" (元旦, Gantan); 40. "New Year's Shrine Visit" (初詣, Hatsumōde)
6	March 4, 2024	978-4-08-883858-8	August 5, 2025	978-1-9747-5551-6
41. "Temperature Difference" (寒暖差, Kandansa); 42. "Various True Intentions" (真意それぞれ, Shin'i Sorezore); 43. "The Porcupine's Ablution" (ハリネズミの禊, Harinezumi no Misogi); 44. "A Collapsing Plan" (計画崩れ, Keikaku Kuzure); 45. "Sunset" (日の入り, Hi no Iri); 46. "Valentine's Day ♪" (バレンタインデー♪, Barentain Dē ♪); 47. "The Twisted Ones' Progress" (ひねくれ者の進行, Hinekuremono no Shinkō); 48. "March" (3月, Sangatsu); 49. "Laughing at a Dropped Chopstick" (箸が転ぶ, Hashi ga Korobu)
7	August 2, 2024	978-4-08-884143-4	November 4, 2025	978-1-9747-5910-1
50. "Birthday ♪" (バースデー♪, Bāsudē ♪); 51. "Probing, Probing" (探り探り, Saguri Saguri); 52. "No Way" (んなわけ, Nnawake); 53. "Masks and Shadows" (仮面と影, Kamen to Kage); 54. "Ahead" (この先, Kono Saki); 55. "Undetermined/Tentative/Confirmed" (未定 / 暫定 / 確定, Mitei/Zantei/Kakutei); 56. "This Way and That" (右往左往, Uōsaō); 57. "Background Noise" (ざわざわ, Zawazawa); 58. "Looking Beyond" (視線の先, Shisen no Saki)
8	March 4, 2025	978-4-08-884294-3	February 3, 2026	978-1-9747-6206-4
59. "His Room and Autumn Rain" (部屋と秋湿り, Heya to Akijimeri); 60. "Where There's a Will" (意思の場所, Ishi no Basho); 61. "Backbone" (よりどころ, Yoridokoro); 62. "Diversions" (気晴らし, Kibarashi); 63. "Processing Error" (処理落ち, Shoriochi); 64. "Starting Line" (スタートライン, Sutāto Rain); 65. "You and I Are Polar Opposites" (正反対な君と僕, Seihantai na Kimi to Boku)

=== Novel ===
A novel written by Shunto Saiba, titled You and I Are Polar Opposites: Sunny & Rainy, was published in Japan on November 2, 2023. It chronicles the events of a single day from the perspectives of three groups.

=== Anime ===
An anime television series adaptation was announced on November 25, 2024. It was produced by Lapin Track and directed by Takayoshi Nagatomo, with series composition handled by Teruko Utsumi, who also served as animation producer, characters designed by Mako Miyako, and music composed by Tofubeats. The series aired from January 11 to March 29, 2026, in the Nichi-5 time slot on all JNN affiliates, including MBS and TBS. The opening theme song is "Lose the Frames" (メガネを外して, Megane o Hazushite), performed by Noa, and the ending theme song is "Pure" (ピュア, Pyua), performed by Pas Tasta featuring Eriko Hashimoto. (Note: "Pure" is used as an insert song in episode 25.) Crunchyroll is streaming the series. Medialink licensed the series in Greater China, South and Southeast Asia for streaming on the Ani-One Asia YouTube channel.

A second season was announced at AnimeJapan on March 29, 2026. It aired in the same time slot from July 5 to October 4 of the same year. The opening theme song is "Nekojarashi" (猫じゃらし), performed by 7co (the music project of Nanako Ashida and Ryuja), and the ending theme song is "Unmei no Kimi" (運命の君; 'You Are the One'), performed by Mega Shinnosuke.

==== Episodes ====
===== Season 1 =====
No. overall	No. in season	Title	Directed by (Note: Production staff information is taken from the ending credits of each episode.)	Written by	Storyboarded by	Original release date
1	1	"You, My Polar Opposite"; Transliteration: "Seihantai na Kimi" (Japanese: 正反対な君)	Takayoshi Nagatomo	Teruko Utsumi	Takayoshi Nagatomo	January 11, 2026
Suzuki is an outgoing high school girl who sits next to Tani, a quiet yet honest-spoken loner student. Suzuki has long been interested in Tani, admiring his unwavering honesty, in comparison to her tendency to be a people-pleaser. After finding out they live in the same direction, she gets the courage to ask him to walk home together. She is flustered and their hands touch by accident, and Tani boldly decides to hold her hand. Suzuki is shocked, but he lets go before other people can see. Yamada confronts Suzuki the next day about whether Tani and her are dating after someone saw them walk home together, and she nervously says that it is not like that, which Tani overhears. Tani says after school to forget about yesterday, thinking it was a mistake on his part. After revealing to her friends that she is in love with Tani, they convince her to chase after Tani. She confesses to Tani that she loves him, and he reveals that he feels the same way, causing her to cry in joy.
2	2	"First Date!"; Transliteration: "Hatsu Dēto!" (Japanese: 初デート！)	Moe Nakahara	Teruko Utsumi	Takayoshi Nagatomo	January 18, 2026
On his way to school, Tani meets Yamada, who is friendly to him and reveals he knows about Suzuki's feelings for him. Suzuki asks to walk home together again, this time they struggle to make conversation. They decide to stop at a park, and after talking through their doubts, they feel more comfortable with each other. Tani asks if she is available during the weekend for a date, and they decide to go get burgers, something they discussed the first time they walked home together. Tani accidentally shows Suzuki his search history, revealing he looked up how to keep a conversation with a girl, causing him to become embarrassed. Suzuki comforts him by saying she finds it adorable and likes that he thinks about her. For their date, they get burgers and go shopping, before eventually going to see a movie. They get matching keychains of a character from the movie and discuss the film, revealing their different interpretations. Before saying goodbye, Suzuki asks to take a picture together as a keepsake, and when she checks it later, it shows that she made a funny face.
3	3	"Cute and Cool"; Transliteration: "Kawaii to Kakkoii" (Japanese: カワイイとカッコイイ)	Minoru Yamaoka	Teruko Utsumi	Keiichi Hara	January 25, 2026
Suzuki talks with her friend Azuma, who is surprised to learn that she has a boyfriend now, revealing her boyfriend was sent to juvie. They meet with another friend, Taira, who is also surprised to learn about Suzuki dating Tani. He firmly believes there is a social hierarchy, and is jealous seeing them happy without regard to this notion. He confronts Suzuki about it later, and she says that she is attracted to how Tani is unwavering to his true self, despite their differences in personalities. Tani has to stay late to work in the library, and Suzuki decides to stop by, but is too shy to admit she just wanted to spend time with him. Tani eventually realizes and asks her to wait for him, which makes Suzuki happy. Tani grapples with what "cute" means to Suzuki, because of the varying ways she uses the word. Tani asks Suzuki about it, and she explains it as an endearing feeling. Suzuki mentions she is excited to learn more about what he likes, and Tani pats her head and calls her cute, causing Suzuki to become flustered.
4	4	"Summer Night Vibes"; Transliteration: "Natsu no Yoru no Baibusu" (Japanese: 夏の夜のバイブス)	Ryō Ōkubo	Teruko Utsumi	Ai Yoshimura	February 1, 2026
Suzuki is excited about going to a summer festival with Tani, but is brought back to reality with end-of-term exams approaching. Yamada and Watanabe are hopelessly underprepared, so they have a group study session in the library, and Tani helps explain some problems, eventually getting bibimbap afterwards. Suzuki checks out a new convenience store near her house, running into Yamada. They meet Taira who is working there, and later Watanabe who rode her scooter. Suzuki is surprised when Tani also shows up, running away because she is embarrassed for wearing casual clothes, but Tani catches up to her on his bike anyways. He expresses jealousy for her friends who have known her longer, wishing she felt as comfortable around him. Feeling more relaxed, she rides home on the back of his bike. Suzuki wears a yukata for their summer festival date, and Tani says she looks beautiful. They get food and play games around the festival. Tani surprises Suzuki by taking them to an overlook to watch the fireworks. After dropping her phone they almost kiss, but her shyness causes her to pull away, despite actually wanting to do it.
5	5	"Someone Who Thinks and Someone Who Doesn't"; Transliteration: "Kangaeru Hito, Kangaenai Hito" (Japanese: 考える人、考えない人)	Kyōhei Ishiguro	Yoshiko Yoshida	Kyōhei Ishiguro	February 8, 2026
Nishi is a quiet girl from a different class who struggles to make conversation. Nishi is talking with her friend Honda when Yamada, who is friends with Honda, joins them. Nishi holds in laughter as Yamada and Honda talk, and it is explained that Yamada is attracted to seeing people laugh who he wouldn't expect to see laugh, being drawn to the common sense of humor despite their differences in personality. Yamada starts coming more frequently, using his friendship with Honda as an excuse to see Nishi, which Honda realizes. Yamada decides to ask for Nishi's contact info, saying he wants to get to know Nishi better. This surprises Nishi and Honda, but Nishi agrees, hopeful that she will feel less nervous texting. Suzuki and Tani make plans to study at the library during summer break. When there are no seats, Tani suggests they study at his house since his parents are gone. She gets to see his room and Tani is surprised when it seems she is leaning in for a kiss, but she was just excited to see Tani's cat. As she is leaving, Tani's grandma catches them and Tani decides to reveal that Suzuki is his girlfriend. Tani's grandma is excited, and Suzuki also reveals to her mom that she has a boyfriend.
6	6	"Cultural Festival!"; Transliteration: "Bunkasai!" (Japanese: 文化祭！)	Yoshiaki Kyōgoku	Teruko Utsumi	Yoshiaki Kyōgoku	February 15, 2026
Suzuki asks Yamada how texting with Nishi was over the summer, and he describes how it was still awkward and that they did not make any progress. During the school festival, Tani and Suzuki walk around together. They check out the photography club display, which is managed by Nishi. Despite being awkward at first, Nishi ends up being able to hold a conversation with Suzuki and Tani. She is happy after that interaction, until she suddenly bumps into Yamada in the hall. The story jumps back to Suzuki and Tani, who bump into Rihito, a friend of Suzuki from middle school and her first boyfriend. They were pressured by people around them to start dating, but they realized quickly that dating was not right for them. Despite trying to go back to being friends, they both felt guilty and it became awkward. They say their minds and work things out, but Tani is unsure how to feel and says he needs time to think. Suzuki is worried, deciding to go after Tani and she hugs him from behind. Tani describes a feeling of guilt for being jealous, thinking that Rihito is more her type, but Suzuki tells him that she loves him as he is. They then shyly call each other by their first names.
7	7	"Fluttery Confusion"; Transliteration: "Dokimoya" (Japanese: ドキモヤ)	Minoru Yamaoka	Yoshiko Yoshida	Minoru Yamaoka	February 22, 2026
The story flashes back to the school festival when Yamada and Nishi bumped into each other. Yamada apologizes to Nishi, feeling he has been too pushy, but Nishi explains that she was just afraid to make mistakes. Yamada says she should make mistakes and be honest with him. Back in the present, Taira is in another self-deprecating loop and we see a traumatic flashback of a girl saying she did not like his personality. He puts on loud music to drown out his thoughts, until Suzuki and Tani surprise him. He complains that they only go to the convenience store when he is working, and they say it is more fun when he is there, which makes him happy. Nishi ends up walking home with Yamada, Suzuki, and Tani after their library shift. She gets flustered talking with Yamada, starting to realize her feelings for him. Suzuki asks Tani about Nishi in a suspicious way, confusing Tani. Taira suggests maybe she is jealous, and Tani has conflicted feelings. After school, Tani and Nishi meet up with everyone as they pass the time with bubbles. Tani is about to talk to Suzuki, but she instead runs up to Nishi (who freezes upon seeing Yamada) and hands her a bubble wand, setting her up since Yamada is holding the soap. It is revealed that Suzuki is not jealous, but is actually just trying to get Nishi and Yamada together after realizing that Yamada likes Nishi. Tani is relieved, but also embarrased for overthinking.
8	8	"This Autumn..."; Transliteration: "Kotoshi no Aki wa..." (Japanese: 今年の秋は…)	Moe Nakahara	Teruko Utsumi	Takayoshi Nagatomo	March 1, 2026
Tani and Suzuki go on a uniform date where they get sweet potato desserts and take pictures at a sticker photo booth. Azuma gets a message from an ex-boyfriend, and she feels down because of it, so Watanabe suggests they go bowling. At bowling, Taira notices a group he knew in middle school gets stressed, but Azuma tells him they will not disturb them. Later Taira asks Azuma about their old friend group, and she says it is awkward because she dated one of the guys and was talking to another, and they are now dating other girls in that group. She gets a text from one of the guys and Taira says she should be mad. She says she can never hate someone she liked before, but Taira points out that people mistreat her because she accepts being treated that way. The following morning, Azuma approaches to thank Taira for opening her eyes to disrespectful attempts of communication, but Taira puzzles her by apologizing, feeling he arrogantly spoke out of line on how she should feel about others. Suzuki's brother and father are away, so Tani comes and meets Suzuki's mom, who is nervous and talkative like Suzuki. They are nervous and struggle to make conversation in Suzuki's room, but eventually hold hands and hug. Suzuki's dad comes home unexpectedly and is surprised that Suzuki has a boyfriend, asking Tani many questions.
9	9	"Surprise!"; Transliteration: "Sapuraizu!" (Japanese: サプライズ！)	Shingo Kaneko	Yoshiko Yoshida	Risako Yoshida	March 8, 2026
Tani's first birthday since they started dating is approaching, and Suzuki wants to surprise him, asking Taira and Yamada for advice. Tani can sense that Suzuki intends to surprise him, but worries that his response will underwhelm her. Taira remembers his birthday, where only Azuma remembered, giving him a sticker that he keeps on his wallet. Suzuki calls Tani at midnight the day of his birthday, wishing him happy birthday, thinking he fell asleep, she says "I love you", and Tani sleepily says the same thing back. His friends all give him gifts, and later Suzuki and him buy cakes from the convenience store, also giving Taira a belated birthday gift. Suzuki asks Tani to decide their next date, and he chooses the Natural History Museum, which starts out rough as the special exhibit hall was crowded. The rest of the museum was better, but again they have trouble finding a place to eat, eventually settling for a food truck. Tani feels like nothing went to plan today, but Suzuki says that she does not really care what they do, as long as it is together. As they are saying goodbye, Suzuki pulls him in and closes her eyes, with Tani giving her a hug and saying goodnight , but as he pulls away, Suzuki pulls him back in and gives him a kiss before embarrasingly saying goodnight and running home.
10	10	"Class Trip (Part 1)"; Transliteration: "Shūgakuryokō! (Zenpen)" (Japanese: 修学旅行！(前編))	Yayoi Takano	Yoshiko Yoshida	Kyōhei Ishiguro	March 15, 2026
Tani and Suzuki are awkward around each other the next day, discussing plans for the school trip. Yamada helps Nishi and Honda with some prep work, and Yamada asks Nishi to tell him when she will be free so they can be together during the trip. The next day, they are supposed to split into groups of three, and Azuma worries she will be the odd one out, but Suzuki asks for an exception so they can all be together. The school trip begins, and Suzuki meets Nishi at their sweets class. After learning what they will be doing tomorrow Suzuki realizes Yamada was influencing their groups plan so he could see Nishi. At their ryokan, the groups take turns using the onsen, and Suzuki talks with Azuma how she wants to do more romance things with Tani. They get out of the onsen and Suzuki finds Tani, surprising him. Tani describes how he was fine being solitary before, but is also happy now getting to experience many new things. Suzuki calls him by his given name and says she loves him, but gets too embarrassed and runs away before he can respond.
11	11	"Class Trip (Part 2)"; Transliteration: "Shūgakuryokō! (Kōhen)" (Japanese: 修学旅行！(後編))	Yoshiaki Kyōgoku	Yoshiko Yoshida	Yoshiaki Kyōgoku	March 22, 2026
Nishi and Yamada end up at the same spot at the same time, but she is initially hesitant because he is with his friends. After some encouragement from Honda, she goes and talks with him, getting to take pictures with him and Suzuki. Later that night, Yamada asks to meet with her at the hotel, but Nishi is worried about other people seeing them together, so Yamada takes them to a quiet place. Before they head back to their rooms, Yamada asks Nishi for a date after the class trip, which she agrees to, realizing her true feelings for Yamada. Despite his bad experiences in the past, Taira realizes he is enjoying himself, but his self-doubt still holds him back. Tani is car sick from the bus ride, and he asks Suzuki stays outside with him before dinner, causing Suzuki to blush. On the last day they are free to explore, so Tani and Suzuki have a date at an amusement park. They want to buy souvenirs, but Tani is self-conscious and holds back. When they meet with the rest of the group, they all have panda hats, including Taira, and Tani regrets not letting loose, with Suzuki saying they should come back someday.
12	12	"Step by Step"; Transliteration: "Hoippo" (Japanese: ほいっぽ)	Takayoshi Nagatomo	Teruko Utsumi	Takayoshi Nagatomo	March 29, 2026
Nishi and Yamada have their first date, and Nishi makes an effort to dress cute, but she gets nervous and decides to take off her accessories. They visit Chinatown and Yamada talks the entire time, with Nishi too nervous to interrupt, but with Yamada's encouragement, they finally hold a conversation. Yamada grabs her arm to direct her, and Nishi slips their hands together. She thinks that Yamada is not fazed at all, but when they accidentally spot Tani and Suzuki on their date, it is revealed that he is shy too, and they run away before they can be spotted. Yamada picks up Nishi's dropped accessories and puts a hair clip into her hair. He is happy that she can look him in the eyes easier, and she promises to look him in the eye more on their next date. Rewinding back to the beginning of the day, it is revealed that Suzuki saw Yamada and Nishi earlier. Tani and Suzuki decide to go to the ferris wheel, which she is excited for because of the manga she reads, but is too shy to do anything with Tani because people can see them. On their way home and with no one around, they finally go in for a kiss, but they are interrupted by a passing car, which is revealed to be Suzuki's parents who give them a ride home. Later, Suzuki happily reflects on the changes happening across her friend group, including between her and Tani.

===== Season 2 =====
No. overall	No. in season	Title	Directed by	Written by	Storyboarded by	Original release date
13	1	"Christmas Eve"; Transliteration: "Kurisumasu Ivu" (Japanese: クリスマスイヴ)	Yayoi Takano	Teruko Utsumi	Ai Yoshimura	July 5, 2026
While walking to the gym, Suzuki and her friends encounter a group of third-year boys fooling around. Azuma plays along, but the others are annoyed. She later complains that strangers often become nervous when she talks to them, and her friends explain that people need time to feel comfortable. They also suggest that she tends to date scummy people because they are more willing to talk without first getting to know her. As winter break approaches, everyone discusses their plans. Yamada offers Nishi and Honda some chicken, then tells Nishi he will text her later, making her blush. After school, the group visits a Christmas light display, where Suzuki reveals that she saw Yamada and Nishi on their date, also suggesting they go on a double date sometime. Taira and Azuma walk home together, but Taira worries that she is annoyed by his company and says he will stop at a bookstore. Azuma is visibly disappointed, and upon realizing his mistake, he changes his mind and rejoins her. Suzuki and Tani decide to make a Christmas cake and accidentally kiss when a bottle falls. Wanting a better first kiss, they try again, but bump their teeth together. They also unknowingly give each other gloves for Christmas, though both are happy with the matching gifts.
14	2	"Dilemma of a Winter's Night"; Transliteration: "Fuyu no Yoru no Jirenma" (Japanese: 冬の夜のジレンマ)	Minoru Yamaoka	Teruko Utsumi	Minoru Yamaoka	July 12, 2026
While working on Christmas, Taira reflects on his past. After losing weight before entering high school, he was asked out by a girl, but the relationship ended when she disliked his personality. Hurt by the experience, he began hiding his true self and avoiding emotional vulnerability. Tani and Yamada later surprise him at work, teasing him about his Santa costume before sharing cake in the parking lot. As they talk, Tani considers how much he has changed since meeting Suzuki and realizes that he now thinks of her before anyone else. Yamada has also grown closer to Nishi and wants to ask her out, though he is unsure how to approach the subject. They arrange to meet at the library, where Yamada becomes unusually nervous and regrets choosing a location with no atmosphere. During their conversation, he notices that Nishi has cut her bangs. She blushes, worried that he will realize she changed them because, on their first date, he said he wanted her to look him in the eyes more. Despite his intentions, Yamada cannot bring himself to ask Nishi out, and she notices that he is much quieter than usual.
15	3	"The Year That's Passed, and the Year to Come"; Transliteration: "Yukutoshi Kurutoshi" (Japanese: 行く年来る年)	Kenta Noda	Yoshiko Yoshida	Kenta Noda	July 19, 2026
On the last day of the year, Tani and Suzuki reflect on their relationship and discuss their plans for New Year's Day. Tani's family initially intend to make their yearly shrine trip with visiting relatives, but the latter are unable to make it. He then spontaneously invites Suzuki over and informs his family of their relationship. The two meet up the next day, and Tani observes that her hair is dyed a different color and also sees she is visibly exhausted. Upon entering their house, Suzuki trips and crushes the treats she brought for his family. Her anxiety persists throughout their lunch together, and on their way to the shrine, she breaks down crying when asked about it. She explains that she became overwhelmed with the pressure of appearing favorably and already suffered a series of mishaps on her way to his house. In response, he and his family assure her that she does not need to worry too much. On the last day of winter break, Suzuki and her friend group visit a shrine at Watanabe's suggestion. They marvel at the view from the hilltop and Watanabe suggests they return during summertime, but Tani tells them he will be too busy by then. He expresses his desire to make the most of their limited time together, surprising everyone else. The next day at school, everyone in the group, except Yamada and Watanabe, suffer from crippling muscle soreness.
16	4	"New School Term"; Transliteration: "Shin Gakki" (Japanese: 新学期)	Kōsuke Miyake	Teruko Utsumi	Takashi Kawabata	July 26, 2026
Taira walks home alone after school when it begins to hail, then rain. Azuma catches up and offers him an umbrella, but they are forced to run to the train station when the winds become too strong. On the train, they converse about Taira's fashion choices throughout high school, which makes him self-conscious. She urges him to have more self-confidence and reminds him that she has always supported him along the way. Taira thanks Azuma for her help once they disembark, and she warmly accepts. Later at home, he reflects on the positive moments he enjoyed in spite of his despair and becomes emotional. Meanwhile, Tani has library duties and Suzuki decides to visit, though he suspects she has an ulterior motive. She brings Yamada along and he playfully converses with Nishi before borrowing a book. Nishi parts ways with the other three while walking home, and Tani finally recognizes the developing relationship between her and Yamada, busting Suzuki. In the morning, Honda asks Nishi about her relationship with Yamada and becomes impatient when learning the two are still hesitant on dating. Honda proposes a scenario where Yamada begins dating another girl, finally prompting Nishi to decide what she wants. When Honda suggests bringing chocolate for Yamada on Valentine's Day, Nishi becomes flustered.
17	5	"Valentine's Day"; Transliteration: "Barentain" (Japanese: バレンタイン)	Moe Nakahara	Yoshiko Yoshida	Moe Nakahara	August 2, 2026 (Note: Due to the broadcast of the 2026 FIVB Men's Volleyball Nations League, this episode aired at 4:00 p.m. JST, 1 hour before the regular air time on MBS.)
Yamada becomes adamant about confessing to Nishi and invites her to meet with him outside her apartment. She declines since it is late and proposes meeting another day, but suddenly realizes his incentive for the invitation. He stays committed to his goal, though, laments rushing the process after returning home. The two meet up and enjoy an extended outing planned by Yamada, who intends to conclude the date by confessing his feelings for Nishi and asking her out. However, she surprises him when she suddenly confesses, causing him to drop his phone for a second time. He is finally able to return her feelings and ask her out while the two are at an indoor observation deck at the date's end. They meet again at school on Valentine's Day and become shy around one other, but Nishi is able to gift him some home-baked cookies after school. Elsewhere, Taira and Azuma head home together on the train and are conflicted on reciprocity for the treats they received since they were unaccustomed to receiving any through previous years. When she offers him a piece of gum, she sarcastically indicates she will be expecting one from him, much to his annoyance. Suzuki gifts Tani some of her home-baked cookies at a park, which he enjoys and thanks her for, before they share a kiss.
18	6	"Threshold of Spring"; Transliteration: "Haru no Temae" (Japanese: 春の手前)	Yayoi Takano	Teruko Utsumi	Yayoi Takano	August 9, 2026
Yamada is congratulated on his new relationship by his friend group, including Taira, who realizes that he has someone he is genuinely happy for now. While he is on the train with Azuma, she points out how little she has seen him laughing over the years, which reminds him of how harshly he was judged in the past for doing so. She thanks him for helping her realize how she should more critically evaluate people's treatment of her and assures him she can be his emotional bedrock as well. On White Day, each friend in the group reciprocates their Valentine's Day gifts with their respective partners, though Suzuki notes how bittersweet March is with the third-years graduating and the classes changing once again. Taira gifts Azuma a handful of treats on the train in return for her support throughout high school. The two go to a cafe to extend their outing and share even more laughs over lunch. When the two of them part ways, they vow to continue their friendship into the next term year. As she walks away, she becomes aware of her budding feelings for him, though he remains completely oblivious.
19	7	"Gradation"; Transliteration: "Guradēshon" (Japanese: グラデーション)	Minoru Yamaoka	Yoshiko Yoshida	Minoru Yamaoka	August 16, 2026
Over spring break, Nishi and Yamada visit the aquarium and enjoy the various exhibits, despite her feeling self-conscious over enjoying herself too much and potentially neglecting Yamada's desires. He later assures her that he enjoys their time together as long as she is happy, before flustering her by using her first name. Meanwhile, Suzuki and Tani visit a park to admire the cherry blossoms on Suzuki's birthday. She later confesses that she worries for the incoming term year as they will likely be separated from each other. While he insists their relationship will not change in spite of this, he silently worries as well. Azuma joins Taira and Yamada at a family restaurant after finishing her shift. She decides to suppress her feelings for Taira as she is concerned it will compromise their friendship. At school, the group is separated into different classes, albeit some of them remain together. Taira and Azuma head home and he reminds her they will still see each other even though they are in different classes. After exchanging goodbyes, she gleefully skips away.
20	8	"The Future"; Transliteration: "Kono Saki" (Japanese: この先)	Yūki Koike	Teruko Utsumi	Yūki Koike	August 23, 2026
A rainstorm derails Nishi and Yamada's park date, so he invites her to his house where she meets his mother and sister. She observes how little his personality changes when he is at home compared to when he is in public and envies him. When he walks her to the bus stop, she verbally expresses that she loves him before kissing him on the lips, leaving them both separately flustered. Suzuki visits a fireworks festival with Tani at her classmate Kawasaki's suggestion. She uses that time to recuperate from her intense studies and confides with him about her uncertainty regarding her future. He comforts her in response, only to realize that his desire to become a schoolteacher was due only to his father holding that position, and thus, never considered any other options. As a result, he becomes unsure about his career choice. Azuma is dismayed to learn that Taira intends to apply for a far-away school. After learning of Tani's uncertainty, Taira reluctantly hands in his application form and runs into Azuma in the hallway, who becomes flustered when she sees him. Taira remains completely oblivious and he later asks her for the community center study hours to intensify his efforts, not knowing Honda was about to be recommended to his school of choice over him.
21	9	"Past and Present"; Transliteration: "Kako to Ima" (Japanese: 過去と今)	Kōsuke Miyake	Yoshiko Yoshida	Shinnosuke Itō & Takayoshi Nagatomo	August 30, 2026
Azuma's feelings for Taira persist throughout their exam studies. Realizing that she loves him, she gets flustered whenever they are together while also growing frustrated with his lack of reciprocation. After their last high school cultural festival where the two take a photo together, he finally realizes Azuma has fallen head over heels in love with him. At the same time, however, he begins to have traumatic flashbacks from his previous relationship and suffers from an inferiority complex. While acknowledging that he becomes emotional from her acts of kindness, and is actually happy being around her, he convinces himself that keeping things the way they are will be the least detrimental course for his relationship with her, leading to him possibly considering rejecting her. Later, he becomes flustered at the thought of her creating memories with him before graduation, though she is convinced he doesn't like her the same way and strongly wishes that she could more purely express her feelings towards him. Meanwhile, Suzuki aspires to attend a school close to Tani to maintain their bond, but he is unsure if that is possible. Nishi has something she wants to ask Yamada about, but withholds it as she wishes to solve it herself.
22	10	"Feelings and Choices"; Transliteration: "Omoi to Sentaku" (Japanese: 想いと選択)	Moe Nakahara	Teruko Utsumi	Takayoshi Nagatomo & Moe Nakahara	September 6, 2026
Nishi struggles to make decisions for herself as she has always deferred to others. When her mother recommends she majors in Business and Economics, Nishi hesitantly objects and declares her intention to instead pursue literature. In a conversation the next day, Honda encourages her to have more confidence in her own will. She walks home with Yamada after school, but asks to hang out longer. They nearly become intimate while alone in his bedroom, prompting him to ask if she is okay with his advances. She responds ambiguously, afraid she might disappoint him, but he insists that she must decide for herself and not based on his reactions. That night, she vows to have more confidence in her own decisions going forward. Suzuki and Tani study together, but separately, in the latter's bedroom. During their break, Suzuki notices an exam booklet for the faraway Nijigaoka University and inquires about his college choices. He asserts that he has since eliminated that college in favor of a closer school, but Suzuki remains unconvinced. Believing she may be interfering with his college aspirations, she proposes that the two split up, horrifying him. He refuses and finally acknowledges that he was deeply influenced by his fear of separation. She is relieved when he decides to keep his options open, but cries at home upon realizing they could have broken up.
23	11	"Somewhere to Belong"; Transliteration: "Ibasho" (Japanese: 居場所)	Minoru Yamaoka	Yoshiko Yoshida	Minoru Yamaoka	September 13, 2026
Taira struggles to process his realization that Azuma loves him. As a result, he is unable to hide his shock in conversations with her, which she interprets as increasing affection from him while still doubting he shares her feelings. On Sato's advice, she reconsiders her relationship with him. While she acknowledges she enjoys his company and their time together, she still longs for romantic reciprocation from him. Meanwhile, Taira, contemplating his inferiority complex, wonders why he feels the way he does, concluding that he becomes pessimistic only as a coping mechanism in the event of a relationship breaking down. Realizing that he has no need to worry, he becomes happy at the thought of finally finding a friend circle in which he truly belongs. The third-years hold an end-of-semester snack party in Suzuki's classroom. Tani, who was just accepted into the faraway Nijigaoka University, is only able to join momentarily as he has cram school afterwards, so Suzuki gleefully gifts him some snacks to fuel his studies, though she worries he may have become too engrossed to slow down.
24	12	"Starting Line"; Transliteration: "Sutāto Rain" (Japanese: スタートライン)	Yayoi Takano	Teruko Utsumi	Yayoi Takano	September 27, 2026
Worried over the limited time they have, Tani crams his schedule to spend time with Suzuki while continuing his studies. On a Christmas date, she chides him for overexerting himself and worries her suggestion to split up may be the cause. This prompts him to finally admit his insecurities, which he had avoided doing out of fear of disappointing her. In springtime after exam season concludes, the third-years graduate and receive their diplomas, spending the final day taking pictures and enjoying the company of peers. An emotional Taira silently takes his leave, prompting Azuma to chase after him. She finds him sitting outside a secluded part of the school where they cry over their high school years ending before thanking one another. They sign each other's yearbooks and realize this may be their last day together should he be accepted into college; thus, Azuma is ready to accept the fact that Taira never had any feelings for her whatsoever, but is happy she had the chance to spend time with him. Suzuki calls out for them and as they are about to walk, he asks Azuma if they can still hang out after graduation, flustering her intensely. In a post-credits scene, Suzuki and Tani hang out on the former's birthday, discussing the uncertainties of their soon-to-be long-distance relationship, while asserting they will remain as the other's emotional bedrock.
25	13	"You and I Are Polar Opposites"; Transliteration: "Seihantai na Kimi to Boku" (Japanese: 正反対な君と僕)	Atsuki Yamai	Teruko Utsumi	Takayoshi Nagatomo	October 4, 2026
A loner Tani experiences incidental conversations with Suzuki and her friends in a flashback to spring of their second year in high school. He struggles to understand the purpose of or ascribe meaning to these encounters until he only has her on his mind. The next day after the two walk home together for the first time, Suzuki is absent from class. Tani worries that the momentary handholding he initiated may be the cause, and later that day, overhears her and her friends discussing it. She loudly denies they are dating, so Tani retrieves his items from his desk and leaves, later apologizing and telling her to forget about it. He walks home alone at the school day's end contemplating his feelings when Suzuki calls out to him to confess, at which point the episode flashes forward through the group's lives after high school, like Suzuki and Tani going on a double date with Nishi and Yamada, and Azuma and Taira enjoying a song together. They reunite for a springtime picnic in a park and take pictures of the occasion, including a group selfie. Later, Suzuki and Tani review the photos at his apartment and share a laugh.

== Reception ==
In 2022, You and I Are Polar Opposites was nominated in the Next Manga Awards in the Web Manga category, and ranked second out of 50 nominees. It ranked 34th on the 2022 "Book of the Year" list by Da Vinci magazine. The series ranked ninth in the 2023 edition of Takarajimasha's Kono Manga ga Sugoi! list of best manga for male readers, tying with Midori no Uta: Shūshū Gunfū. The series ranked third in the 16th Manga Taishō, tying with Onna no Sono no Hoshi; it ranked seventh in the 17th edition in 2024. The series ranked twelfth in the National Bookstore Employees Recommended Comics of 2023 list; it was also ranked second in the 2024 list. The series ranked sixth in the 2023 Tsutaya Comic Award. The series, alongside The Strange House, won the Men's Comic Prize at NTT Solmare's "Minna ga Erabu!! Denshi Comic Taishō 2024" competition in 2024. It was nominated in the Daruma for Best Romance Manga category at the Japan Expo Awards in 2026. By May 2026, the series had over 2.1 million copies in circulation, including digital versions.

Louis Kemner of Comic Book Resources positively compared the series to My Dress-Up Darling, noting the similarities in the lead characters' chemistry and the story's use of the "opposites attract" romantic paradigm.

== See also ==
- The Ramparts of Ice, another manga series by the same author
