= Ahiru no Sora =

Japanese manga series

- Cover of the first tankōbon volume, featuring Sora Kurumatani

あひるの空
- Genre: Sports
- Manga
- Written by: Takeshi Hinata
- Published by: Kodansha
- Imprint: Shōnen Magazine Comics
- Magazine: Weekly Shōnen Magazine
- Original run: December 10, 2003 – present
- Volumes: 51
- Anime television series
- Directed by: Keizō Kusakawa (chief); Shingo Tamaki
- Produced by: Satoshi Umetsu
- Written by: Gō Zappa
- Music by: Hiroaki Tsutsumi
- Studio: Diomedéa
- Licensed by: NA: Sentai Filmworks; SA/SEA: Muse Communication
- Original network: TV Tokyo, AT-X, BS TV Tokyo
- Original run: October 2, 2019 – September 30, 2020
- Episodes: 50
- icon

Ahiru no Sora (あひるの空; lit. 'Sky of the Duck' or 'Sora the Duck') is a Japanese basketball-themed manga series written and illustrated by Takeshi Hinata. It has been serialized in Kodansha's shōnen manga magazine Weekly Shōnen Magazine since December 2003, with its chapters collected in 51 tankōbon volumes as of June 2019. A 50-episode anime television series adaptation produced by Diomedéa was broadcast from October 2019 to September 2020.

== Plot ==
Sora Kurumatani made a promise to his mother, "I will dominate my first high school tournament". But as he joins the basketball club after entering Kuzuryū High School, he finds out that it's become a stomping ground for delinquents. A place where everything but basketball is done, but with Sora's genuine zeal for basketball, things begin to stir.

== Characters ==
Sora Kurumatani (車谷空, Kurumatani Sora)
Voiced by: Yuki Kaji; Natsumi Fujiwara (child) (Japanese); Cameron Bautsch; Brittney Karbowski (child) (English)
Momoharu Hanazono (花園百春, Hanazono Momoharu)
Voiced by: Yuma Uchida (Japanese); Joe Daniels (English)
Chiaki Hanazono (花園千秋, Hanazono Chiaki)
Voiced by: Katsuyuki Konishi (Japanese); Andrew Love (English)
Kenji Natsume (夏目健二, Natsume Kenji)
Voiced by: Kishō Taniyama (Japanese); David Matranga (English)
Kaname Shigeyoshi (茂吉要, Shigeyoshi Kaname)
Voiced by: Mamoru Miyano
Shinichi Yasuhara (安原真一, Yasuhara Shinichi)
Voiced by: Taku Yashiro (Japanese); Michael Wronski (English)
Ryuhei Nabeshima (鍋島竜平, Nabeshima Ryuhei)
Voiced by: Chado Horii (Japanese); George Cote (English)
Masahiro Saki (茶木正広, Saki Masahiro)
Voiced by: KENN (Japanese); Benjamin McLaughlin (English)
Madoka Yabuchi (薮内円, Yabuchi Madoka)
Voiced by: Sayaka Senbongi (Japanese); Olivia Swasey (English)
Nao Nanao (七尾奈緒, Nanao Nao)
Voiced by: Yuna Taniguchi (Japanese); Cat Thomas (English)
Yuka Kurumatani (車谷由夏, Kurumatani Yuka)
Voiced by: Aya Endō (Japanese); Maggie Flecknoe (English)
Shinichi Chiba (千葉真一, Chiba Shinichi)
Voiced by: Kazuya Nakai (Japanese); David Wald (English)
Tokitaka Tokiwa (常盤時貴, Tokiwa Tokitaka)
Voiced by: Soma Saito (Japanese); Heath Morrow (English)
Tarō Kabachi (蒲地太郎, Kabachi Tarō)
Voiced by: Jun Fukuyama
Shingo Katori (香取真吾, Katori Shingo)
Voiced by: Makoto Furukawa
Yukinari Kojima (児島幸成, Kojima Yukinari)
Voiced by: Hiroyuki Yoshino
Katsumi Takahashi (高橋克己, Takahashi Katsumi)
Voiced by: Daisuke Namikawa
Sei Shiraishi (白石誠, Shiraishi Sei)
Voiced by: Takahiro Sakurai
Shigenobu Yakuma (八熊重信, Yakuma Shigenobu)
Voiced by: Yūichirō Umehara
Hyou Fuwa (不破豹, Fuwa Hyou)
Voiced by: Yoshitsugu Matsuoka
Yozan Kamiki (上木鷹山, Kamiki Yozan)
Voiced by: Yūto Uemura
Shōgi Satsuki (五月正義, Satsuki Shōgi)
Voiced by: Eiji Takemoto
Tomohisa Kurumatani (車谷智久, Kurumatani Tomohisa)
Voiced by: Takehito Koyasu
Yone Kurumatani (車谷ヨネ, Kurumatani Yone)
Voiced by: Kaoru Katakai
Kamaike (鎌池, Kamaike)
Voiced by: Misato Murai

== Media ==
=== Manga ===
Ahiru no Sora, written and illustrated by Takeshi Hinata, began in Kodansha's shōnen manga magazine Weekly Shōnen Magazine on December 10, 2003. In January 2019, Hinata announced that the manga has entered its final arc. On May 15 that same year, Weekly Shōnen Magazine announced that the manga would enter a "short hiatus" beginning the following issue. Kodansha has compiled its chapters into individual tankōbon. The first volume was published on May 15, 2004. As of June 17, 2019, fifty-one volumes have been released.

==== Volumes ====
| No. | Japanese release date | Japanese ISBN |
|---|---|---|
| 01 | May 15, 2004 | 978-4-06-363374-0 |
| 02 | June 16, 2004 | 978-4-06-363383-2 |
| 03 | August 13, 2004 | 978-4-06-363421-1 |
| 04 | November 16, 2004 | 978-4-06-363455-6 |
| 05 | January 15, 2005 | 978-4-06-363475-4 |
| 06 | March 16, 2005 | 978-4-06-363506-5 |
| 07 | June 16, 2005 | 978-4-06-363531-7 |
| 08 | August 13, 2005 | 978-4-06-363567-6 |
| 09 | October 15, 2005 | 978-4-06-363588-1 |
| 10 | January 15, 2006 | 978-4-06-363615-4 |
| 11 | April 17, 2006 | 978-4-06-363642-0 |
| 12 | June 16, 2006 | 978-4-06-363680-2 |
| 13 | September 15, 2006 | 978-4-06-363720-5 |
| 14 | December 15, 2006 | 978-4-06-363746-5 |
| 15 | March 16, 2007 | 978-4-06-363804-2 |
| 16 | June 15, 2007 | 978-4-06-363839-4 |
| 17 | September 14, 2007 | 978-4-06-363884-4 |
| 18 | December 17, 2007 | 978-4-06-363925-4 |
| 19 | March 17, 2008 | 978-4-06-363961-2 |
| 20 | June 17, 2008 | 978-4-06-363997-1 |
| 21 | September 17, 2008 | 978-4-06-384037-7 |
| 22 | December 17, 2008 | 978-4-06-384074-2 |
| 23 | March 17, 2009 | 978-4-06-384110-7 |
| 24 | June 17, 2009 | 978-4-06-384145-9 |
| 25 | September 17, 2009 | 978-4-06-384184-8 |
| 26 | February 17, 2010 | 978-4-06-384221-0 |
| 27 | April 16, 2010 | 978-4-06-384294-4 |
| 28 | July 16, 2010 | 978-4-06-384326-2 |
| 29 | October 15, 2010 | 978-4-06-384377-4 |
| 30 | February 17, 2011 | 978-4-06-384440-5 |
| 31 | April 15, 2011 | 978-4-06-384482-5 |
| 32 | July 15, 2011 | 978-4-06-384517-4 |
| 33 | October 17, 2011 | 978-4-06-384562-4 |
| 34 | February 17, 2012 | 978-4-06-384627-0 |
| 35 | September 14, 2012 | 978-4-06-384671-3 |
| 36 | October 17, 2012 | 978-4-06-384718-5 |
| 37 | March 15, 2013 | 978-4-06-384809-0 |
| 38 | July 17, 2013 | 978-4-06-384844-1 |
| 39 | December 17, 2014 | 978-4-06-394962-9 |
| 40 | March 17, 2015 | 978-4-06-395380-0 |
| 41 | September 17, 2015 | 978-4-06-395499-9 |
| 42 | November 17, 2015 | 978-4-06-395571-2 |
| 43 | February 17, 2016 | 978-4-06-395633-7 |
| 44 | June 17, 2016 | 978-4-06-395695-5 |
| 45 | August 17, 2016 | 978-4-06-395771-6 |
| 46 | December 16, 2016 | 978-4-06-395813-3 |
| 47 | March 17, 2017 | 978-4-06-395926-0 |
| 48 | August 17, 2017 | 978-4-06-510000-4 |
| 49 | March 16, 2018 | 978-4-06-511333-2 |
| 50 | November 16, 2018 | 978-4-06-512838-1 |
| 51 | June 17, 2019 | 978-4-06-516068-8 |

=== Anime ===
An anime television series adaptation was announced in February 2018. The series was directed by Shingo Tamaki, with Keizō Kusakawa serving as chief director, and written by Gō Zappa, with animation by Diomedéa. Character designs were provided by Yoshino Honda, and Hiroaki Tsutsumi composed the music. The series aired from October 2, 2019, to September 30, 2020, on TV Tokyo, AT-X, and BS TV Tokyo. The opening theme song is "Happy Go Ducky!" by the Pillows, while the ending theme song is "Tsubasa" by saji. The second opening theme song is "Never Mind" by Flumpool, while the ending theme song is "Over" by Yuma Uchida.

Sentai Filmworks has licensed the series worldwide excluding Asia. An English dub premiered on November 13, 2019. Muse Communication has licensed the series in Asia-Pacific and streamed it on Muse Asia YouTube channel.

==== Episodes ====
| No. | Title (Note: All English titles are taken from Crunchyroll.) | Original release date |
|---|---|---|
| 1 | "The Ugly Duckling"; Transliteration: "Minikui Ahiru no ko" (Japanese: みにくいあひるの子) | October 2, 2019 |
| 2 | "Boys Without Talent"; Transliteration: "Sainō no nai Shōnen-tachi" (Japanese: 才能のない少年達) | October 9, 2019 |
| 3 | "Momoharu's Wings"; Transliteration: "Momoharu no Tsubasa" (Japanese: 百春の翼) | October 16, 2019 |
| 4 | "First Flight"; Transliteration: "Hajimete no Hishō" (Japanese: 初めての飛翔) | October 23, 2019 |
| 5 | "Broken Wings"; Transliteration: "Oreta Tsubasa" (Japanese: 折れた翼) | October 30, 2019 |
| 6 | "Now's the Time"; Transliteration: "Imashikanee" (Japanese: 今しかねえ) | November 6, 2019 |
| 7 | "The Troublesome Freshman"; Transliteration: "Meiwaku na Ichinenbō" (Japanese: 迷惑な一年坊) | November 13, 2019 |
| 8 | "The Duck and the Kite"; Transliteration: "Ahiru to Tobi" (Japanese: アヒルとトビ) | November 20, 2019 |
| 9 | "Kite, His Ball, and the Team's Pain"; Transliteration: "Tobi to Bōru to Nakama no Itami" (Japanese: 鳶とボールと仲間の痛み) | November 27, 2019 |
| 10 | "Manager"; Transliteration: "Manējā" (Japanese: マネージャー) | December 4, 2019 |
| 11 | "The Boys' Stubbornness and Girls' Pride"; Transliteration: "Otoko no Iji to Onna no Puraido" (Japanese: 男の意地と女のプライド) | December 11, 2019 |
| 12 | "TEAM" | December 18, 2019 |
| 13 | "Differing Enthusiasm"; Transliteration: "Ondo no Chigai" (Japanese: 温度の違い) | December 25, 2019 |
| 14 | "Towards Victory"; Transliteration: "Shōri ni Mukatte" (Japanese: 勝利に向かって) | January 8, 2020 |
| 15 | "The Boys' Spirit"; Transliteration: "Otoko no Kokoroiki" (Japanese: 男の心意気) | January 15, 2020 |
| 16 | "The Best Start and the Worst Start"; Transliteration: "Saikō no Hajimari to Saiaku no Hajimari" (Japanese: 最高の始まりと最悪の始まり) | January 22, 2020 |
| 17 | "Versus"; Transliteration: "Bāsasu" (Japanese: バーサス) | January 29, 2020 |
| 18 | "Now..."; Transliteration: "Ima..." (Japanese: 今・・・・。) | February 5, 2020 |
| 19 | "Higher Than Anyone"; Transliteration: "Dare Yori mo Takaku" (Japanese: 誰よりも高く) | February 12, 2020 |
| 20 | "Last Play"; Transliteration: "Rasuto Purei" (Japanese: ラストプレイ) | February 19, 2020 |
| 21 | "Tears"; Transliteration: "Namida" (Japanese: 涙) | February 26, 2020 |
| 22 | "The Last Piece"; Transliteration: "Rasuto Pīsu" (Japanese: ラストピース) | March 4, 2020 |
| 23 | "The Moon and the Hoop"; Transliteration: "Tsuki to Ringu" (Japanese: 月とリング) | March 11, 2020 |
| 24 | "Light"; Transliteration: "Hikari" (Japanese: 光) | March 18, 2020 |
| 25 | "Undiscovered Talent"; Transliteration: "Umoreta Sainō" (Japanese: 埋もれた才能) | April 1, 2020 |
| 26 | "RUSH AND RUSH" | April 8, 2020 |
| 27 | "THE HARD PLAY" | April 15, 2020 |
| 28 | "Vow"; Transliteration: "Chikai" (Japanese: 誓い) | April 22, 2020 |
| 29 | "Bonds"; Transliteration: "Kizuna" (Japanese: キズナ) | April 29, 2020 |
| 30 | "Reason for Living"; Transliteration: "Sonzai-igi" (Japanese: 存在意義) | May 6, 2020 |
| 31 | "What Must Be Protected"; Transliteration: "Mamorubeki-mono" (Japanese: 守るべきもの) | May 13, 2020 |
| 32 | "TIME LIMIT" | May 20, 2020 |
| 33 | "LIFE" | May 27, 2020 |
| 34 | "Light Trails"; Transliteration: "Kōseki" (Japanese: 光跡) | June 3, 2020 |
| 35 | "STAND" | June 10, 2020 |
| 36 | "KIDS ARE ALLRIGHT" | June 17, 2020 |
| 37 | "TENDER" | July 1, 2020 |
| 38 | "Earring"; Transliteration: "Piasu" (Japanese: ピアス) | July 8, 2020 |
| 39 | "FIGHT FOR ROCK FOR LIFE" | July 15, 2020 |
| 40 | "STOP & GO" | July 22, 2020 |
| 41 | "Challenger"; Transliteration: "Chōsensha" (Japanese: 挑戦者) | July 29, 2020 |
| 42 | "War Declaration"; Transliteration: "Sensen Fukoku" (Japanese: 宣戦布告) | August 5, 2020 |
| 43 | "The Best Lineup"; Transliteration: "Besuto Menbā" (Japanese: ベストメンバー) | August 12, 2020 |
| 44 | "Fuse"; Transliteration: "Dōkasen" (Japanese: 導火線) | August 19, 2020 |
| 45 | "Break"; Transliteration: "Bureiku" (Japanese: ブレイク) | August 26, 2020 |
| 46 | "Certain Proof"; Transliteration: "Aru Shōmei" (Japanese: ある証明) | September 2, 2020 |
| 47 | "Sora the Duck"; Transliteration: "Ahiru no Sora" (Japanese: 家鴨の空) | September 9, 2020 |
| 48 | "The Straight Story"; Transliteration: "Sutoreito Sutōrī" (Japanese: ストレイトストーリー) | September 16, 2020 |
| 49 | "The Last Period"; Transliteration: "Rasuto・Piriodo" (Japanese: ラスト・ピリオド) | September 23, 2020 |
| 50 | "Bridge"; Transliteration: "Burijji" (Japanese: ブリッジ) | September 30, 2020 |

== Reception ==
Several volumes of the series appeared on Oricon's list of best-selling manga volumes from 2009 to 2011. It was the 23rd best-selling manga series in Japan in 2011, with 1,739,105 copies sold. By February 2018, the manga had over 24 million copies in circulation.

In July 2020, Takeshi Hinata expressed his dislike of the anime adaptation in a number of posts on Twitter, later writing, "If I caused discomfort to fans of that project, then I apologize. I also want to apologize to the people who are true Ahiru no Sora readers. I think that the direction of the anime is disappointing and terrible. I apologize once again."
