= Pasocom Music Club =

Japanese electronic pop group

- Also known as: パソコン音楽クラブ
- Origin: Osaka Prefecture, Japan
- Genres: Synthpop, J-pop, EDM
- Years active: 2015-present
- Members: Aoi Shibata, Masato Nishiyama
- Website: www.pasoconongaku.club

Pasocom Music Club (パソコン音楽クラブ) is a Japanese synth-pop duo, formed in 2015 by Aoi Shibata and Masato Nishiyama. The group started by posting songs to SoundCloud, before making their debut with the EP Park City, released on Maltine Records in 2017. They have composed songs for multiple television shows, including Yurei Deco and Pokémon Journeys: The Series.

== Career ==
=== Formation ===
The group was formed in 2015, after Shibata and Nishiyama went to a second-hand shop with ¥10,000, and bought cheap 90's synthesizers. They began gathering an audience by posting songs to SoundCloud throughout 2015 and 2016. They released their debut EP "Park City" in 2017.

=== Dream Walk ===
The band self-released their debut album, Dream Walk, on June 20, 2018. They held multiple release parties across Japan, with performances by artists including DJ Newtown. Also in 2018, they contributed to the soundtrack of the TV drama Den'ei Shōjo - Video Girl Ai 2018.

=== Night Flow ===
The band released their second album, Night Flow on September 4, 2019. The album was inspired by how nighttime enhances people's feelings. The album peaked at 49 on the Japanese Oricon charts. In November 2019, they made an ending theme for Pokémon Journeys: The Series. On August 7, 2020, they released the EP Ambience. The EP was a departure from their traditional style, instead dabbling in the genre of ambient house.

=== See-Voice ===
On October 13, 2021, the band released their third album, See-Voice. The album peaked at 45 on the Oricon charts. On July 27, 2022, the band released the digital single "KICK&GO". A few days later, they played at Fuji Rock Festival 2022. They produced the song "PARK" for the Neibiss EP Space Cowboy. In November, they released the single "SIGN", featuring singer Takashi Fujii. The band released an EP titled Depot (vol. 1) on January 24, 2023. They released volume two a month later on February 27.

=== Fine Line ===
On May 10, 2023, the group released their fourth album Fine Line. The album includes the singles "Kick&Go" and "Day After Day".

=== Love Flutter ===
Pasocom Music Club's 5th album, Love Flutter, was released on August 7, 2024. The album includes features from artists including tofubeats.

== Discography ==
=== Studio albums ===
No.	Album details	Charts
No.	Album details	JPN
1	Dream Walk: Released: June 20, 2018	—
2	Night Flow: Released: September 4, 2019	49
3	See-Voice: Released: October 13, 2021	45
4	Fine Line: Released: May 10, 2023	36
5	Love Flutter: Released: August 7, 2024	-

=== EPs ===
No.	EP details
1	Park City: Released: April 2, 2017
2	Ambience: Released: August 7, 2020
3	Depot (Vol. 1): Released: January 24, 2023
4	Depot (Vol. 2): Released: February 27, 2023
