= Lovely Planet 2: April Skies =

2019 video game

- Developer: Quicktequila
- Publisher: tinyBuild
- Composer: Calum Bowen
- Engine: Unity
- Platforms: Windows; OS X Linux
- Release: June 18, 2019
- Genres: First-person shooter, platform
- Mode: Single-player

Lovely Planet 2: April Skies is a first-person shooter platform video game developed by Indian indie developer Quicktequila and published by tinyBuild. It was released for Microsoft Windows, OS X and Linux in June 2019. The game is a sequel to 2014's Lovely Planet. The game received mixed reviews from critics.

== Gameplay ==
Like its predecessor, April Skies is a speedrunning-focused first-person shooter where the player must complete the level as fast as possible to progress. Levels are split up into larger areas. Being hit by a bullet, falling, or touching enemies causes the player to die instantly, memorizing levels is a key mechanic to progressing.

It has been considered easier than its predecessor. The game contains over 100 levels.

== Development ==
The game's music and tone have been compared to Katamari Damacy. Calum Bowen returned to compose the music.

Another game in the series, Lovely Planet Remix, was released on November 12, 2021.

== Reception ==
Reception

Aggregate scores
Aggregator	Score
Metacritic	69/100
OpenCritic	67% recommend

Scott Ellison of Saving Content rated the game 4/5, calling it a "fast and fluid speedrunner". He noted the mechanic of dying instantly can become "frustrating".

The game received mixed reception, according to review aggregator Metacritic.
