= Fine Line (Pasocom Music Club album) =

Studio album by Pasocom Music Club
- Released: May 10, 2023
- Genre: Synth-pop
- Length: 32:43
- Label: Hatihati Pro

Pasocom Music Club chronology
See-Voice (2021)	Fine Line (2023)

Fine Line is the fourth album by Japanese synth-pop duo Pasocom Music Club. The album was released on May 10, 2023, through the group's management company Hatihati Pro. The album's theming is centered around space and aliens.

== Promotion ==
Two songs were released as singles, "KICK&GO" and "Day After Day". On release day, the album hit 17th on the Oricon chart, and the group were featured guests on NHK FM. The group announced a release tour across Japan throughout June and July 2023, featuring appearances from Neibiss and imai of group inou, among other artists.

== Track listing ==
Fine Line track listing
No.	Title	Length
1.	"Prologue"	0:44
2.	"Pump!" (featuring Chelmico)	3:00
3.	"Ch.XXXX"	2:37
4.	"It's(Not)Ordinary" (featuring MICO)	1:17
5.	"Kick&Go" (featuring Hayashi Aozora)	3:00
6.	"Dog Fight"	1:36
7.	"Omitnak"	2:25
8.	"Sport Cut"	2:56
9.	"UFO-mie" (album mix; featuring The Hair Kid)	3:24
10.	"Phase-Shift" (skit)	0:55
11.	"Playback"	2:06
12.	"Terminal"	3:53
13.	"Day After Day" (featuring Mei Takahashi)	4:43
Total length:		32:43

== Charts ==
Chart performance for Fine Line
Chart (2023)	Peak position
Japanese Albums (Oricon)	36
Japanese Digital Albums (Oricon)	47
Japanese Hot Albums (Billboard Japan)	32
