= Netlabels in Japan =

Since the mid-2000s, a counterculture has taken place where numerous netlabels, online labels that release their music for free, located in Japan have been formed and garnered a huge amount of publicity which, according to writer Patrick St. Michel, has shaped how popular Japanese music is produced. Japan's netlabel phenomenon was the first time in the history of the nation's music industry where underground musicians could produce their works however they wanted to and have their music noticed by the public; this is an aspect that was previously absent at a time when major labels in the country followed a conservative method where they managed how artists would produce their music. Starting in the 2010s, the netlabel scene has crossed over to the mainstream music landscape and all across the world, with netlabel producers transitioning into working for bigger labels and western producers like Cashmere Cat and Ryan Hemsworth being influenced by the music of Japanese netlabels.

== History and notable labels ==
=== Lost Frog Productions ===
Lost Frog Productions is a noise, experimental, and electronic label founded in 1992 by Haruo Ishihara. In the Japanese underground, they are considered the oldest Japanese netlabel in existence. Their website activity was logged starting in 1996, with the invention of the Internet Archive, and their first release in audio file format was on April 20, 2003, with the release of Surfers of Romantica's Heavy Metal. They were, and still are, a netlabel that heavily encouraged the free and/or inexpensive distribution of music, having all of their digital releases up for download on their website, and later reissued their previous albums released on CD to reflect this mentality.

As time went on, Lost Frog's musical focus drifted from musical experimentation and noise, to other more rhythmic electronics, such as breakcore, speedcore, IDM, footwork (alongside its breakcore-infused variant, footcore), and various other sampling-based electronic genres.

=== Minus N ===
Ryosuke Hidaka estimated that Netlabels began increasing publicity outside Japan around 1999 and 2000. Minus N began formation in 2003. While Minus N set the model of distribution of Japan's netlabel community in that every release was issued for free online, it garnered the most attraction from Western territories due to acts from all across the world on the label.

=== Maltine Records ===
Maltine Records is one of the most popular imprints in the netlabel scene of Japan. There have been more than 130 releases under the label as of December 2014.

In 2005, high school freshmen Tomohiro Konuta, also known as Tomad, and Syem, his real name not revealed, formed the electronic dance music netlabel Maltine Records as a way to distribute their music. Konuta explained, "During that time, there were a lot of internet labels starting to pop up overseas, and people uploading their music online for free—this influenced me and gave me the idea to start Maltine." With Maltine, the two also released tracks from artists they found on internet bulletin boards and services such as 2chan and Myspace. In the words of journalist Patrick St. Michel, the label gained attention due to "a combination of reoccurring musicians and one-off releases."

Starting in the early 2010s, Maltine has used methods to spread their music around to those who don't have computer internet access; this included making and releasing the compilation album MP3 Killed The CD Star? (2010) on CD and a free iPhone application for listening to music by the netlabel. Maltine has crossed over into the mainstream ever since the 2010s. In 2013, Maltine collaborated with Tokyo Girls' Style for its producers such as tofubeats, Avec Avec and okadada to create remixes of songs by the girl group in what was titled Maltine Girls’ Wave. The Fader described the project as "wonderfully weird fusion of corporate-sponsored pop and quirky internet funk." Maltine's music has served as stylistic influences for the works of Western artists such as Cashmere Cat and Ryan Hemsworth; Hemsworth has featured Maltine's music on the mixes and live sets.

According to St. Michel, almost every track Maltine releases are dance music re-interpretations of J-pop: "None of the songs scattered across Maltine's website resemble AKB48, but rather are a re-imagining of Japanese mainstream pop created for the dance floor rather than an ice-cream commercial." Maltine began releasing breakbeat and gabber tracks before they expanded to releasing music of various styles such as synthpop, house music, drum 'n' bass, techno, ambient music, 2-step, jersey club, indie pop and rap. St. Michel wrote that most Maltine releases are "strange" takes on the way electronic dance and pop music is made; for instance, several music released by the netlabel contain anime and video game samples over "normal" dance instrumentals, thus creating "faster releases imagining a world where Aphex Twin really liked Sailor Moon and decided to incorporate it into his music." A track by Maltine regular contributor Gassyoh is a house song featuring samples from the role-playing video game EarthBound (1994).

=== Bunkai-Kei Records ===
Bunkai-Kei Records is an ambient and glitch music netlabel that is also one of the biggest imprints in the Japan netlabel scene. The netlabel had been around a few years before Maltine began, but did not start gaining attention until after the popularity of Maltine. One of their releases is a record by Vocaloid musician kz. Their later works included singing from vocalists such as Tokyo singer Smany, pornographic actress Yura Sakura, and Brooklyn-based singer Abigail Press.

=== Bump Foot ===
Formed in 2005, the netlabel Bump Foot release two types of records: "Bump House," which issues techno and house albums, and “Foot Side,” which is for "music meant to be absorbed," as St. Michel wrote. Bump Foot has the most releases out of all the Japanese netlabels (More than 400 as of December 2014), and also features the highest number of non-Japanese artists.

=== MarginalRec. ===
The Tokyo netlabel MarginalRec. has released what St. Michel described to range "from remixes of popular J-pop songs, to anthemic floor fillers, to fidgety built-for-headphones numbers." He cited it as an "essential" to the Japan netlabel community for its heavy focus on live nightclub events known as Another Weekender, which are also streamed to the internet via Ustream.

=== ALTEMA Records ===
ALTEMA Records has issued music in a variety of electronic music genres, including brostep, intelligent dance music and tracks featuring samples of sounds from 1990s computer programs. St. Michel spotlighted the netlabel's heavy emphasis on anime, with many of the cover arts including cute anime drawings. He noted ALTEMA's aesthetic as an example of the obsession towards anime art that is commonplace in Japanese netlabels.

=== Trekkie Trax ===
The netlabel Trekkie Trax originated as a party titled "Under 20" that took place in the Akihabara area of Tokyo. It soon transformed into an online label that issued dance music touching on genres such as juke house, 2-step, brostep, and grime-influenced dub music. In 2014, the label gained international attraction through appearances on the Tokyo radio station block.fm. On April 11, 2014, the Finland label released Trekkie Trax Japan Vol. 1 (2014), a compilation album of the works of Trekkie Trax. The compilation was one of many ways Trekkie Trax "fought against" a law in Japan that stated people were not permitted to dance in nightclubs without "dancing licenses." The law ended in 2015.

=== Skull Triangle Skull ===
Netlabel created in 2012 by Satomi Fukada. Mainly for witch house & vaporwave music. Located in the city of Sapporo.

=== Otherman Records ===
Otherman Records is a breakcore netlabel that began in 2010 and have released works with elements of chiptune and drum'n'bass. It has released the harshest-sounding music that has been a part of the netlabel scene.

=== Indie netlabels ===
While a majority of music that comes out of the Japan netlabel landscape is based on electronic dance music, there have also been Japanese netlabels that have mainly issued indie pop and rock music.

==== Canata Records ====
Formed in November 2011 by producers Azusa Suga and Yoshiki Iwasawa, Canata Records is a Tokyo-based label for bedroom musicians from around the world. Iwasawa was inspired to start an indie label following a conversation with a book store buyer who suggested there was going to be an indie revival in Japan, a "third Summer of Love" that would be “partly influenced by Japanese indie music and anime culture.” Thus, the works of Canata include aspects of anime series and indie music.

Canata's music has touched on styles such as shoegaze, indie pop, Vocaloid rock and, in the words of St. Michel, "nostalgic, sample-heavy" chillwave and vaporwave works by founder Azusa Suga. St. Michel noted the label's "weird" experimentation of the indie pop genre; an example would be its first releases by the groups Mane Laundering and The Hatsune Mikus, who works combined Vocaloid singing with indie and twee-pop elements.

==== Ano(t)raks ====
The label Ano(t)raks began on July 1, 2012, by Dai Ogasawara, also known by the moniker Twangy Twangy, and focuses on guitar-heavy twee pop inspired by the works of Sarah Records. The name of the label is a play on the word anorak, clothing that is often associated with most indie-pop artists from the United Kingdom. Ogasawara formed Ano(t)raks out of desire to release music with the groups The Paellas and Post Modern Team that he first met via Bandcamp.

Ano(t)raks' first release was an extended play by The Paellas. On September 14, 2012, they released what St. Michel described as "the best snapshots" of Japan's indie scene, a compilation album titled Soon V.A. which features music from indie acts throughout the country, such as Old Lacy Bed from Nagoya and Homecomings from Kyoto. The album received attention from music blogs across the world, and led to some of the bands featured on the record gaining gig opportunities according to Ogasawara.

Ano(t)raks is cited as one of the few labels to increase the popularity of indie pop in Japan in 2012. Homecomings and the Paellas, two acts formerly from the netlabel, have gone to become part of major labels.

=== Tanukineiri Records ===
Tanukineiri Records is a Japanese netlabel that St. Michel highlighted for its lack of stylistic "identity" uncommon in the scene. Their styles range from four-on-the-floor dance music to folk music to experimental lo-fi music to Indonesian indie pop. While most of their music is issued for free online like all the other Japanese netlabels, they've also released some works on compact disc.

== Origins and impact ==
“Five years ago, even in Tokyo, it was quite strange for a DJ to play this ‘geeky’ type of music. However, now it is becoming more popular and trendy. My brother [who records under the name Carpainter] has a lot of tunes which contain a lot of ‘video gamey’ style sounds, was supported by Ryan Hemsworth, an iconic producer from LA. Thus, such a trend helps me as a DJ or a label owner to get into the scene in US. People in here are really interested in Japanese music, which they probably have never heard before.”

— Trekkie Trax founder Seimei Kawai in a February 2015 interview with Tokyo Weekender

Kill Screen writer Caty McCarthy summarized that the ability to create whatever music an artist wanted to in Japanese netlabels was "welcome in a music scene where cookie-cutter idol groups are common, and diversity among their style is rare." She categorized Japan's netlabel scene as a counterculture against the nation's major labels who would've otherwise not allowed how producers in the netlabel community made their work: "For largely the first time, underground musicians were given the voices and agency they so desperately desired." She also highlighted the Japan netlabel landscape to have more of an "actual, tangible community" than netlabel scenes in other territories, noting it to have "grandiose roster-wide celebrations" and "subterranean bass-heavy parties." As St. Michel wrote, "the most influential Japanese netlabels have already helped shepherd a new generation of producers to greater awareness while shaping the future of popular Japanese music."

In a March 2013 interview, Hikada said that around 2008, there were approximately 20 netlabels located in Japan; he saids that the amount rose to around 150 five years later. An attribute to the success of Japanese netlabels is the popularity of social networking services like Facebook and Twitter that the imprints use to promote new artists and releases. Hikada marks this social network element of the scene to also come into play into live performances that are a part of the community. As St. Michel explained, "Hikada says party goers spend a lot of time tweeting at these nights, using hashtags to keep up with everyone else there and using the social-media site to toast one another. At one Maltine party in 2012, a large swath of attendees brought laptops with them, and many live-streamed themselves dancing on the floor…to others in the same room."

In the 2010s, the scene started to cross over in the mainstream. Netlabel musicians that transitioned in working for mainstream labels include Avec Avec, Yoshino Yoshikawa, tofubeats and Fazerock; tofubeats became a solo act for Warner Bros. Japan, collaborating with American singer Liz and providing a mix for the radio series Diplo and Friends.

However, in a December 2014 feature, St. Michel also wrote that many Japanese netlabels have very short lifespans: "browsing the “links” pages of still-thriving netlabels leads to lots of 404 errors or domain-for-sale pages. Minus N's site is now riddled with script mistakes."

== Live performances ==
There are very few netlabels in Japan that have the budget to set up and hold live events. However, all of the live events that have occurred have been successful, St. Michel analyzed.

In December 2012, the Tokyo nightclub Womb held "an all-netlabel party" featuring acts from netlabels such as Maltine, Bunkai-Kei, No Disco and On Sunday Recordings.
