= Realm versus Realm =

Type of player versus player gameplay

Realm versus Realm (RvR) is a type of player versus player (PvP) gameplay in massively multiplayer online role-playing games (MMORPGs) where the player base is divided over multiple preset realms that fight each other over game assets. This differs from normal Player versus Player combat in that Realm versus Realm usually involves a combat-based game, as opposed to one where sporadic Player versus Player combat occurs. In this context, "realm" generally means a geographic territory or political affiliation.

This concept is also referred to as Group versus Group, Race versus Race, Nation versus Nation, or Faction versus Faction depending on the specific implementation in the game under discussion. Contrast with "Guild versus Guild" games (or GvG, in an alternate usage from Group versus Group), such as Shadowbane or Age of Conan, in which players organize themselves into factions of their own creation and design rather than realms which are prebuilt by the game developers.

== Origin ==
In 2001, Mythic Entertainment introduced a new team-based form of PvP combat with the release of Dark Age of Camelot and called it Realm versus Realm. In Realm vs Realm the rules would be similar to PvP combat. Where a single combatant or a group faces one another in PvP, RvR introduces entire factions fighting each other. RvR was also made more interesting by bypassing the normal "red vs blue" type team battles seen in most games at the time. For RvR, they created a third faction to bring about a large scale "Rock-Paper-Scissors" experience. Last they chose to allow Realm vs Realm to be played out in an open world PvP environment known as the RvR zone. The RvR zone was a free to roam map where players had the choice of where to attack, when to attack, and with how many players. Complete battlefield freedom (even the freedom to not take part) allowed for RvR and DAoC to become one of the most successful MMOs of its time.

== Other games ==
Mythic's second MMORPG, Warhammer Online, was also an RvR game. It featured the conflict between the realm of Order and the realm of Destruction as a core gameplay aspect. Mark Jacobs has more recently led a team re-imagining the Dark Age underpinnings of RvR with a new game called Camelot Unchained that is still in development. Other RvR MMORPG games of note are Guild Wars 2, Albion Online, Elder Scrolls Online, and Champions of Regnum.

Many other massively multiplayer online games include RvR elements without classifying themselves as a RvR game. Such titles include Anarchy Online, where three groups of characters that fight in designated PvP areas, EVE Online, a space-based MMORPG where different factions and player created alliances fight over specific regions, and PlanetSide 2, a MMOFPS where three factions fight for control over territories.
