= Terris =

Terris may refer to:

== Arts ==
- Legends of Terris, a text-based game by English game designer Paul Barnett
- Terris (band), Welsh indie band

== People ==
=== Surname ===
- Archibald Terris (1873–1938), coal miner and political figure
- John Terris (1939–2026), New Zealand politician, priest and broadcaster
- Harold A. Terris (1916–2001), military pilot, civil servant, and politician
- Malcolm Terris (1941–2020), British actor
- Norma Terris (1904–1989), American musical theatre star
  - Norma Terris Theatre, a theatre in Chester, Connecticut
- Sid Terris (1904–1974), top rated American lightweight boxing contender

=== Given name ===
- Terris Moore (1908–1993), explorer, mountaineer, pilot, and second president of the University of Alaska
- Terris Nguyen Temple (1944–2024), American artist and Tibetan Buddhist

== Religion ==
- Association of Catholic Clergy Pacem in Terris, a regime-sponsored organisation of Catholic clergy in the communist Czechoslovakia
- Pacem in terris, a papal encyclical issued by Pope John XXIII on 11 April 1963
- Pacem in Terris Award, a Catholic peace award
