= Magestorm =

1996 video game

- Developer: Interworld Productions
- Publishers: Engage Games Online; WorldPlay Entertainment; GameStorm
- Designers: Mark Jacobs, Rob Denton, Matt Firor
- Platform: Microsoft Windows
- Release: 1996 (NA)
- Genre: First-person shooter/role-playing video game
- Mode: Online (50 players simultaneous)

Rolemaster: Magestorm (since 2001, Magestorm Millennium) was an online-only first-person shooter using magical spells as weapons. It was developed in 1996 by Interworld Productions (later known as Mythic Entertainment).

== Gameplay ==
It centered on team-based gameplay and included some role-playing video game elements, notably the character class and level-based systems. The four character classes were the Wizard, Psionic, Eldritch and Healer; but prior to Magestorm Millennium, the character classes were named as Magician, Mentalist, Arcanist and Cleric, respectively. A character could gain experience points by hitting other players and raise up to level 30. Each gained level gave spell picks which allowed to unlock new spells.

== Development ==
Rolemaster returned to computer games in the 1990s when Mythic Entertainment released three games that used the Rolemaster system: Rolemaster: Magestorm (1996), Darkness Falls (1997), and Rolemaster: Bladelands (1997). They also published a Silent Death computer game (1999).

== Availability ==
The game was a feature of various gaming services over the years. Firstly as part of the Engage Games Online service, before moving to AOL. For a time, there was choice between the hourly billing method of AOL's game service versus the flat monthly charge offered by rival service Gamestorm. The game was also briefly available via the Gamezone network in Europe. Magestorm is currently available to play at https://gamemodi.net/#magestorm and https://magestorm.fathomthat.org No download is required—just open the link and play.

When Electronic Arts purchased both the AOL Games Channel and Gamestorm, the game was shut down almost immediately in 2000. As compensation, players of the game were given free copies of Ultima Online. The game however was relaunched as Magestorm Millennium in 2001, on the Mythic-Realms game service, operated by Mythic Entertainment itself. It brought together the former two communities of AOL and Gamestorm and was one of the most popular games on the service, surpassing its spiritual successor, Spellbinder: The Nexus Conflict, developed in 1999.

The official server run by Mythic Entertainment is no longer available and was retired in January 2006, along with all other games offered on the Mythic-Realms gaming center excluding Dragon's Gate.

An unofficial server emulator, Magestorm Revival, began development in 2009. It has been dropped.

Another unofficial server emulator, Magestorm on Gamemodi, has been open and available for play since 2017.
