= Paul Barnett (video game designer) =

British video game designer

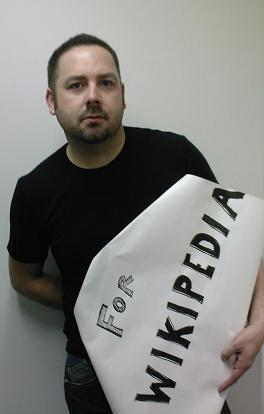
- Paul Barnett
- Born: Paul Barnett
- Occupation: Game designer
- Notable work: Warhammer Online
- Website: www.myspace.com/thatbarnettbloke

Paul Barnett is an English game designer who is a Global Product Director at Wargaming, working on their game World of Tanks. Before that he worked at Electronic Arts' Office of the Chief Creative Officer and was the General Manager of Mythic Entertainment, a subsidiary of EA. Barnett had a lead role in developing EA's Warhammer Online MMO in Europe.

== Career ==
In his 20s, Barnett started developing a text-based game, Legends of Terris, which he finished after three years. At the time, it was the largest text-based game in Europe. After this, Barnett worked on other games, including Legends of Cosrin and Kingdom of Heroes. Legends of Terris was launched on AOL in the UK in 1995, and in the US in 1996. AOL described the game as "[their] first real interactive game."

He helped with the design of the massively multiplayer online role-playing game (MMORPG) Warhammer Online: Age of Reckoning under the direction of CEO Mark Jacobs and producer Jeff Hickman.

== Speaking engagements ==
In February 2008, Barnett gave a talk at the European LIFT 08 conference. This talk was the highest watched video of the show, gaining over 50,000 views within 48 hours. His talks also received coverage in business media. BusinessWeek writer Matt Vella described it as "one of the most non-geek accessible I've ever heard" and praised its accomplishment of "smartly analogiz[ing] the games industry to both films and Las Vegas without being heavy-handed."

Barnett was also invited to record a special BombCast with the crew from GiantBomb, where he lists his Top 10 Games of 2010
