= Warhammer Online: Wrath of Heroes =

- Developer: BioWare Mythic
- Publisher: Electronic Arts
- Series: Warhammer Fantasy
- Engine: Gamebryo
- Platform: Microsoft Windows
- Release: Cancelled
- Genre: MOBA
- Mode: Multiplayer

Warhammer Online: Wrath of Heroes was a multiplayer online battle arena being developed by BioWare Mythic and supposed to be published by Electronic Arts for Microsoft Windows until it was cancelled. The game was a spin-off based on Warhammer Online: Age of Reckoning and was a Play4Free title, Electronic Arts' free-to-play model.

The game did not progress beyond beta and was shut down on March 29, 2013, effectively cancelling it.

== Development and release ==
Wrath of Heroes was announced on August 16, 2011, by BioWare at the Gamescom 2011. BioWare also presented a brief demo of Wrath of Heroes at Gamescom. The game was presented on August 28 at the PAX Prime 2011.

On April 10, 2012, Wrath of Heroes entered open beta.

On February 28, 2013, EA announced the open beta would be shut down and the project cancelled; this occurred as announced on March 29, 2013. The FAQ on EA's website regarding Wrath of Heroes states "Mythic as a studio is undergoing a paradigm shift as we shift our focus to mobile. As part of this pivot, we had to make a few changes and reallocate resources to support this new direction. As such, we took a long look at Wrath of Heroes and despite its strong IP, gameplay, and community support; we decided not to continue the service past its Beta and instead concentrate those resources on our new endeavors."

The assumption, however, is that the game was not making enough money for EA to justify launching from beta.
