= Mythica =

Cancelled video game

Mythica was a never-released massively multiplayer online role-playing game (or "MMORPG") based on Norse mythology. It was under development by Microsoft Game Studios (MGS) for Windows-running PCs until it was cancelled in early 2004. The game had been under development for over two years and had a development staff of forty at the time of cancellation.

As with most MMORPGs, one would have needed to purchase the game software and then subscribe to the game service, paying a monthly fee. The combat design was centered on being a demigod, including the ability to swat waves of enemies aside to focus on their boss.

== Lawsuit ==
In December 2003, Microsoft was sued for trademark infringement and unfair competition by Mythic Entertainment, the developers of the competing MMORPG Dark Age of Camelot. Mythic claimed in the lawsuit that the terms "Mythic" and "Mythica" were so close as to cause consumer confusion, thus infringing on Mythic's trademark.

On May 25, 2004, three months after the game was cancelled, Mythic Entertainment announced that the case was settled and that Microsoft agreed to not use the Mythica name on new online computer games and to not register it as a trademark. Also as part of the deal, Microsoft gave Mythica-related trademarks and domain names to Mythic.

== Cancellation ==
Microsoft had begun promoting the game; the company had hosted a party at Gen Con for fans.

On February 12, 2004, MGS announced the cancellation of Mythica. Microsoft claimed the cancellation was not due to the lawsuit, and cited the competitive MMORPG market and a desire to not "spread ourselves out over multiple MMORPG projects."

At the time, Microsoft operated Asheron's Call and Asheron's Call 2, and was planning to publish Brad McQuaid's new MMORPG: Vanguard: Saga of Heroes for PC and True Fantasy Live Online, an anime-esque MMOG for the Xbox console. However, as with Mythica, the latter game was never released.

As a result of the decision, around forty positions at MGS were cut. Among those were executive producer Matt Wilson, senior designer Hal Milton and lead designer Joel Manners.

Some commentators said at the time that the cancellation was evidence that the (English language) massively multiplayer market had become saturated, though World of Warcraft, released in November 2004, subsequently became the most popular MMORPG in the West with over 3 million Western subscribers as of December 2007.
