= Warhammer Online: Age of Reckoning =

2008 video game

- Developer: Mythic Entertainment
- Publisher: Electronic Arts
- Designers: Mark Jacobs; Paul Barnett; Jeff Hickman
- Series: Warhammer Fantasy
- Engine: Gamebryo
- Platforms: Windows; Mac OS X
- Release: 18 September 2008 (Windows); 28 October 2009 (Mac OS X)
- Genre: Massively multiplayer online role-playing
- Mode: Multiplayer

Warhammer Online: Age of Reckoning (officially abbreviated as WAR) is a discontinued massively multiplayer online role-playing game based on Games Workshop's Warhammer Fantasy setting, developed by Mythic Entertainment and published by Electronic Arts in 2008. The game revolves around the continual worldwide conflict that the Warhammer Fantasy setting is known for, and the game is geared toward ongoing, constant war laced with dark humour. Age of Reckoning sold over a million copies and peaked at 800,000 subscribers, but dropped to 300,000 subscribers several months later. The game received generally positive reviews from critics but shut down in 2013. Since at least 2014, an active private server called Return of Reckoning has been run by fans, and it remains active as of May 2026.

== Gameplay ==
Warhammer Online: Age of Reckoning featured Mythic Entertainment's Realm versus Realm (RvR) combat system, originally developed in Dark Age of Camelot. This took place within three different racial pairings: Dwarfs vs. Greenskins, Empire vs. Chaos, and High Elves vs. Dark Elves. Although there were only two races per pairing, players could travel to either of the other two pairings to help fight with their friends and allies. There were four types of RvR combat: Skirmishes (random world encounters), Battlefields (objective-driven battles in RvR-specific areas), Scenarios (instanced, point-based battles against the opposing faction), and Campaigns (invading enemy lands and capital cities). In RvR players fought other players and, to a lesser extent, non-player characters.

Each activity generated Victory Points (VP) which measured a realm's progress in capturing a zone. When one realm reached a designated number of Victory Points in a particular zone, that zone fell under their control and the war pushed deeper into enemy territory. This back and forth struggle for zone control would continue until one side held two racial pairings, and the attacking side may sack, loot, and pillage the enemy's capital city. The capture of a capital city was the objective of the campaign. Once a capital city was taken, the attackers were given a period time to loot the city. When this period expired, the defeated players received increasing support from NPC guards until they were able to force the attackers out of their city and close the gates. At this point the campaign would then begin anew, restarting the cycle.

Warhammer Online: Age of Reckoning was an RvR game with two factions: Order and Destruction. Each faction contained three separate armies, each of which was further broken down into four career choices. Each of the careers (classes) in Warhammer Online conformed to an archetype role. For example, the Warrior Priest was an archetypal support or healer career, though he also had many melee DPS elements. In this way, the careers were given variety and avoided being simple reiterations of common archetypes. The initial character creation process allowed players to select the race, career, and basic look of their character, including facial features and accessories. In addition to the original name that the player would choose for their character at creation, the player had the option to add a surname to their character for a small fee at rank 20. Dye was available at NPC vendors for recolouring armor and accessories. Players were able to decorate themselves with trophies, such as the heads of fallen enemies, which would be equipped and displayed at various points on the character model.

Mythic offered four different server types at launch: Core, Open RvR, Role-Play, and Open RvR/RP. On Core servers, enemy factions could only attack each other if both players are flagged for RvR. Players were automatically flagged for RvR upon entering RvR-specific areas or enemy PvE areas, and could choose to turn their flag on at any time. Open RvR servers were flagged for RvR at all times, with few exceptions. Role-Play servers had the same rules as the Core servers, and players were encouraged to role-play their characters. Finally, Open RvR/RP servers followed the same rules as the Open RvR servers, and players were encouraged to role-play their characters.

== Development and release ==
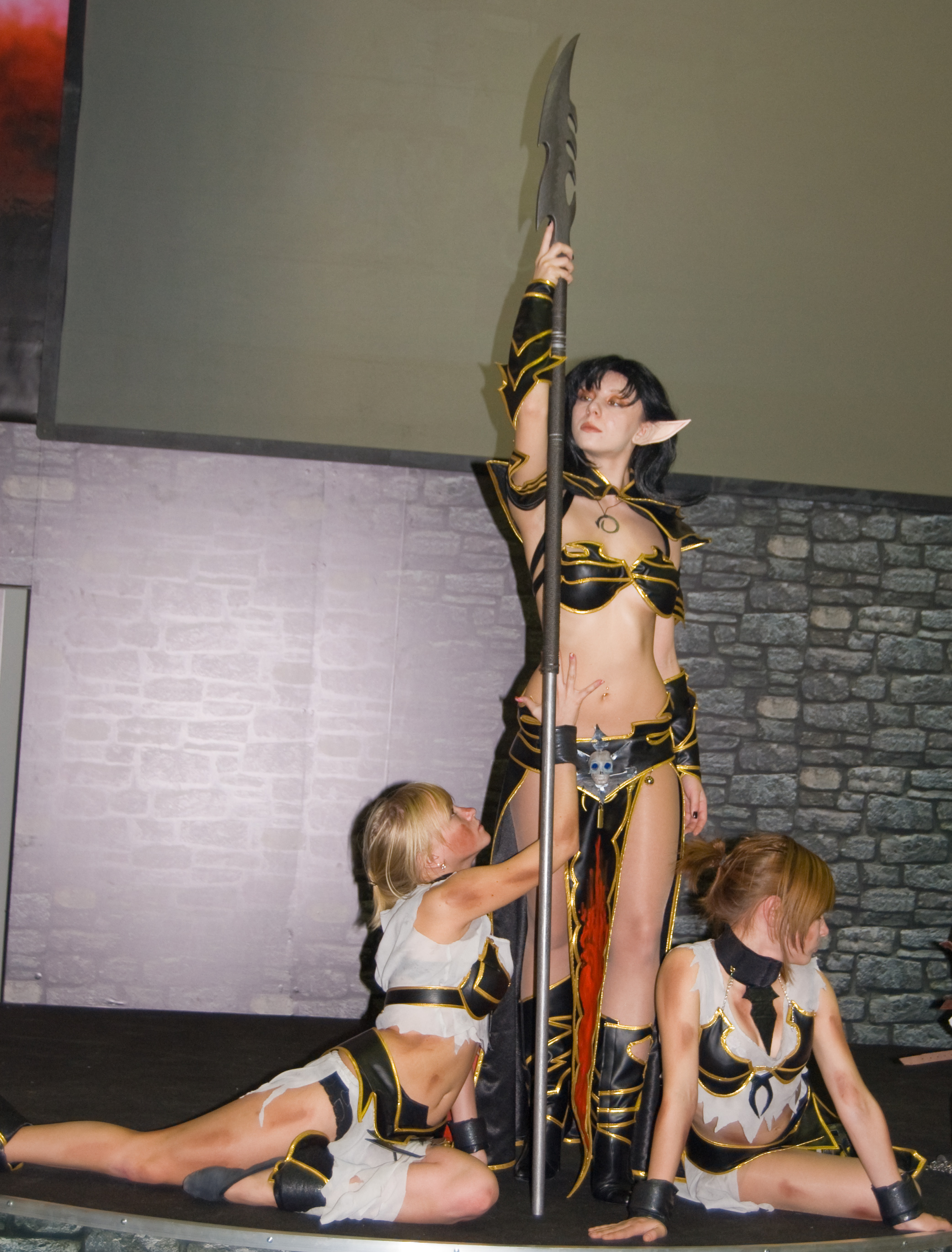
Promotional models at IgroMir 2008

Development began under the company Climax Online, but the project was canceled in June 2004 when Games Workshop determined that the roll-out costs would be too high. However, work on the game never actually stopped. Climax Online continued the project using their own funds until the company reported in late 2004 that the Warhammer Online project was shut down due to difficulty in securing a publishing agreement. With the license available again, Games Workshop was approached by Mythic Entertainment, who were interested in acquiring the license and starting a new project from scratch. A long-standing relationship between several Games Workshop managers and the CEO of Mythic Mark Jacobs ensured that a deal was quickly reached. The Warhammer Online license was acquired by Mythic on May 18, 2005. Mythic soon cancelled its original follow-up project Imperator Online after gaining the Warhammer license.

Warhammer Online: Age of Reckoning is not a direct adaptation of either Warhammer Fantasy Battles or Warhammer Fantasy Roleplay or any other source alone, but rather from the Warhammer Fantasy universe as a whole. It was developed by Mythic Entertainment, but Games Workshop was also involved in the ongoing development of the project. Their role was not only to ensure that the project remains true to the Warhammer Fantasy franchise but also to work with Mythic to allow for the appropriate development and extension of the setting as necessary for the MMO. Mythic had previously created MMOs, including Dark Age of Camelot.

During the development of Warhammer Online, Mythic featured a video blog of creative director Paul Barnett. These videos gave the viewer an insight into the work that went on behind the scenes of WAR, often showcasing development screens and concept art for the game. Mythic also released "Development Diaries" from time to time, meant to give readers a deeper look into the ongoing development of WAR.

The Windows version was simultaneously released in North and South America, Europe, Asia, Australia and New Zealand on 18 September 2008. On 30 July 2009, Mythic Entertainment announced that Warhammer Online was being ported to the Mac OS X platform in 2009, with a beta version becoming available immediately. The full version was released on 28 October 2009. Like other Electronic Arts Mac games, Warhammer Online for Mac uses the Cider portability engine by TransGaming Technologies.

As of 31 December 2008, the number of active WAR subscribers had decreased to over 300,000 paying subscribers in North America and Europe. As of the end of March 2009, the company reported a loss of $1.08 billion in the financial year for 2009. Consequently, the number of servers was drastically reduced in order to consolidate the remaining population. The total number of servers was reduced to thirteen and the number of role-playing servers was reduced to only one. Several servers were stopped, particularly in Europe, and there remained only nine servers: four in the United States and five in Europe (including two in Germany and one in France). From 9 February 2011, two other U.S. servers and one German server were removed, leaving a total of six servers worldwide (two in the US, four in Europe). From 14 December 2011, the game was down to three servers, one for the US, one for Germany, and one for the rest of Europe.

On 18 December 2013, Warhammer Online was shut down, due to the license agreement with Games Workshop coming to an end. Mythic was working on a free-to-play version of the game, as well as another game titled Warhammer Online: Wrath of Heroes.

== Reception ==
Reception

Aggregate scores
Aggregator	Score
GameRankings	85%
Metacritic	86/100

Review scores
Publication	Score
1Up.com	A−
Eurogamer	8/10
Game Informer	8/10
GameSpot	8.5/10
GameSpy	5/5
PC Gamer (UK)	8.8/10
PC Gamer (US)	86%

Warhammer Online received favorable reviews. It holds an aggregate score of 86/100 on Metacritic and 85% at GameRankings.

GameSpy claimed it "has hit the ground running with one of the best MMO experiences we've had in a long time." GameSpot reviewer wrote "questers and explorers may not find what they're looking for, and certain gameplay systems don't mesh as well as they should. Nevertheless, there's more than enough exciting PvP content here to keep newcomers and veterans alike immersed in the perpetually violent tug of war between the forces of Order and Destruction."

As of 30 September 2008, WAR had sold 1.2 million copies and had 800,000 registered users. As of 10 October 2008, Mythic Entertainment announced that 750,000 people were playing Warhammer Online.

=== Awards ===
Warhammer Online has received a number of awards, including the following ones:

- IGN PC: Best of E3 2008-Best MMO
- IGN PC: 2008 Best Persistent World Game
- IGN PC: 2008 Reader's Choice
- GameSpy: Best of E3 2008
- GameSpy: Best Use of License
- GameSpy: Top 10 PC Games – Ranked #2
- G4TV: Best of E3 – PC
- Massively – Favorite New MMO of 2008
- Macworld: 2009 Game Hall of Fame inductee
- MMORPG.com – Reader's Choice Awards – Best New Game of 2008
- MMORPG.com – Reader's Choice Awards – Most Innovative Feature
- MSNBC – Best PC games of 2008
- Voodoo Extreme: E3 2008 – Best MMO
- Warcry's Editor's Choice: Most Anticipated of 2008
- X-Play: Best MMO
- Ten Ton Hammer: Best Fantasy MMOG
- Ten Ton Hammer: Best of Show
- Beckett Massive Online Game Reader's Choice Award: Most Anticipated MMO
- Warcry's Editor's Choice: 2007's Most Anticipated
- MMORPG.com Readers Choice: Most Anticipated
- MMORPG.com: Best Use Of A License
- Game Daily Nod Award
- Voodoo Extreme: Best Massively Multiplayer Game
- GameSpot Editor's Choice: Best Stage Demo
- Ten Ton Hammer Editor's Choice Award

During the 12th Annual Interactive Achievement Awards, the Academy of Interactive Arts & Sciences nominated Warhammer Online for "Massively Multiplayer Game of the Year".
