= Roland Emmerich's unrealized projects =

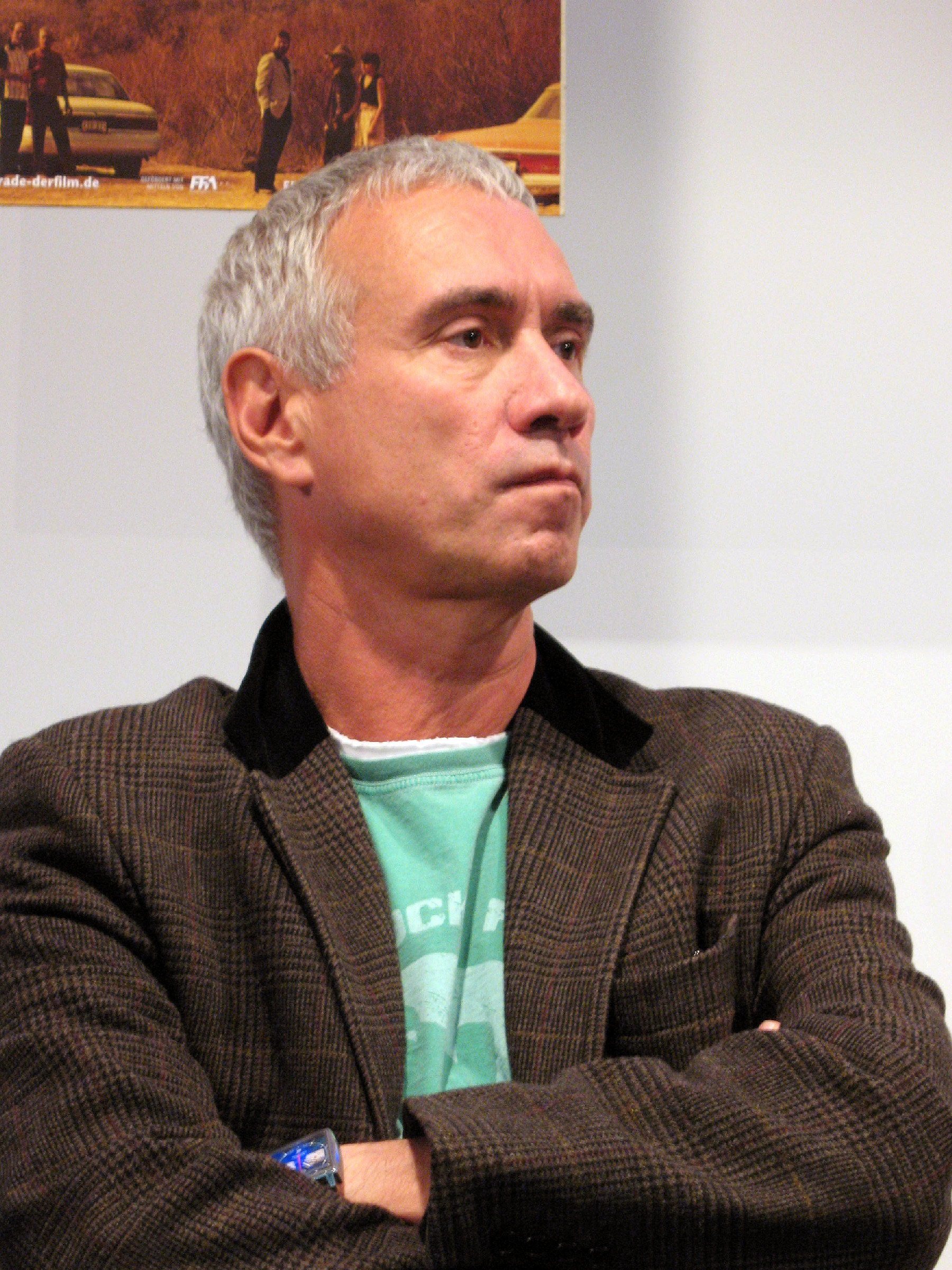
Emmerich in 2007

During his long career, German filmmaker Roland Emmerich has worked on several projects which never progressed beyond the pre-production stage under his direction. Some of these fell into development hell, were officially cancelled, or would see life under a different production team.

== 1990s ==
=== Isobar ===
In 1990, Emmerich was hired by Carolco Pictures to direct the science fiction film Isobar, originally written by Jim Uhls and previously titled The Train. The film, budgeted at $90 million, was set to be produced by Joel Silver and star Sylvester Stallone and Kim Basinger, with Emmerich asking Dean Devlin to rewrite the script for him. On February 25, 1998, it was reported that Emmerich and Devlin had bought the rights to the project and were moving it to Sony Pictures, where the duo had signed a production deal. On May 12, 2005, it was announced that Devlin was reviving Isobar on his own, commissioning Tab Murphy to write a new script and reconfiguring it as a $45 million production, with Voltage Pictures handling sales at the Marché du Film, and the project planned for production in 2006. By June 19, 2006, the project was set to be released by Metro-Goldwyn-Mayer as one of three films Devlin and his Electric Entertainment company would produce as part of a non-exclusive deal with the studio, with Devlin hoping to begin production on the project by the end of the year. On August 23, it was reported that Peter Winther was set to direct the film.

=== The 10th Planet video game ===
In 1994, Emmerich and Dean Devlin got involved with Bethesda Softworks to develop the video game The 10th Planet, which was scheduled to be released in October 1997, but got canceled.

=== Fantastic Voyage remake ===
In 1998, Emmerich was set to direct a remake of the 1966 sci-fi film Fantastic Voyage for 20th Century Fox. In August 2007, Emmerich was reconfirmed as the director, with his company Centropolis Entertainment producing alongside James Cameron's Lightstorm Entertainment, and Cormac and Marianne Wibberley set to write the screenplay. In September 2007, Emmerich discussed the project with Empire, stating that he disagreed with Cameron's idea to give the film a futuristic setting. By 2010, Paul Greengrass entered talks to direct the project for Fox and Cameron, with Shane Salerno hired to write the screenplay, with Emmerich reported as having since departed the project to focus on 2012 due to scheduling issues caused by the 2007–08 Writers Guild of America strike. In April 2024, Cameron offered an update on the project: "we plan to go ahead with it very soon." In July 2024, Emmerich revealed that the true reason behind his departure from Fantastic Voyage had to do with Cameron's creative interference:

"James Cameron is very overbearing, and so I, at one point, just gave up. Because it's like, 'Is it your movie or my movie?' We were in very beginning stages. Because I said, 'Gosh, why is he so overbearing?' I have to say, I do my stuff, and when I can't do my stuff, I'm totally not interested. As simple as that. So when somebody else wants to say something to me and is more powerful than me, I drop out."

Cameron responded to Emmerich's comment in August that year, by saying, "Yes, I'm overbearing. Damn right. When it's a project where I've contributed to the writing, I might actually have an opinion on it. I actually don't even remember talking to Roland Emmerich about Fantastic [Voyage]."

== 2000s ==
=== Light of Peace ===
On November 27, 2001, it was announced that Emmerich's Centropolis Entertainment had acquired the screenplay Light of Peace, a World War I drama written by Mirko Betz, with Emmerich attached to direct. While the project was not set up at a studio, it was reported that Columbia Pictures had right of first refusal on the project.

=== Alien Prison ===
On March 20, 2002, Emmerich was in talks to direct Alien Prison for Columbia Pictures, which he would also co-produce alongside Douglas Wick and Lucy Fisher of Red Wagon Productions, with the most recent draft being written by Andrew W. Marlowe.

=== Tut ===
In October 2003, it was announced that Emmerich would direct Tut for Columbia Pictures and producer Mark Gordon, from a screenplay by Sean O'Keefe and Will Staples. According to The Hollywood Reporter, the film was to be "an action-adventure/love story about the young pharaoh Tutankhamen and his attempt to reclaim his throne and save his country after the death of his father." On May 12, 2004, it was reported that the project would be Emmerich's next film following The Day After Tomorrow.

=== Anthem ===
In April 2004, it was announced that Emmerich would develop and direct the political thriller Anthem for Columbia Pictures. The project reportedly involved "an impeached president who refuses to leave the White House" and "an FBI agent [who] is rushing to discover the truth behind a top-level conspiracy that threatens to undermine the Constitution."

=== Foundation film trilogy ===
On January 16, 2009, Emmerich was in talks to direct the film adaptation of Isacc Asimov’s Foundation, as well as produce the film adaptation with Michael Wimer. On July 25, 2009, it was announced that Robert Rodat would write the screenplay. On February 11, 2010, Emmerich intended to use 3D motion capture for his film adaptation of the Foundation trilogy. On September 15, 2011, Dante Harper was hired to adapt the trilogy. The film failed to materialize, and eventually the books were adapted into the television series of the same name on Apple TV+ without Emmerich's involvement.

== 2010s ==
=== The Zone ===
On October 29, 2010, Emmerich was set to direct the found-footage alien invasion film The Zone, with Guillaume Tunzini writing the script and Loucas George producing for Columbia Pictures, with the film set to be cast with relative unknowns and produced on a $5 million budget. However, on November 9, the film was shut down the week before it was meant to start filming, with The Hollywood Reporter reporting that Peter Mackenzie and Brandon Scott had been cast as a journalist and a cameraman, respectively.

=== Singularity ===
On June 29, 2011, Emmerich was set to direct the film Singularity, with Harold Kloser writing the script, and later that November, Luke Grimes, Logan Marshall Green, Julian Morris, Thomas McDonell, Ben Barnes, and Luke Bracey auditioned for the lead role. On January 4, 2012, it was reported that Sony had halted production on the project in late 2011.

=== Happy Birthday, Mr. President ===
In September 2011, Emmerich revealed plans to make Happy Birthday, Mr. President his next film following Anonymous, adding that "the title will tell you everything". It was set to be "an experiment in digital re-creation" that would feature both John F. Kennedy and Marilyn Monroe as minor characters. Anonymous screenwriter John Orloff wrote the project. Emmerich described the script that November as "a historical thriller about how the FBI and its forces conspired to bring down the Kennedys". Happy Birthday, Mr. President has been proven difficult to finance due to its risky political subject matter. In 2016, Emmerich stated that he was reluctant to take on the project anytime soon due to the technology not being advanced enough at that time to be able to accurately portray the faces of the historical figures depicted in the film. "That's not totally possible [now], but pretty soon," he said. In a 2022 interview for The Hollywood Reporter, he reaffirmed his interest in someday making the film. When asked about his dream project during a panel at the 2024 San Diego Comic-Con, Emmerich singled out Happy Birthday, Mr. President as his favorite script, but said that his efforts to make the film had been consistently hamstrung by various legal issues and concerns.

=== Untitled TV pilot ===
On January 4, 2012, it was announced that ABC had ordered an apocalyptic television pilot set during the 2012 Presidential Election from Emmerich and Harold Klosner, which they would also produce with The Mark Gordon Company, with Emmerich directing the pilot for the 2012-2013 television season.

=== Untitled T. E. Lawrence miniseries ===
On April 30, 2013, it was announced that Emmerich was adapting the story of British lieutenant T. E. Lawrence in the form of a six-hour television miniseries with Fremantle, with Rod Lurie and Clive Bradley set to write the project. In 2022, Emmerich told The Hollywood Reporter that he was still working on it and that he had found an English writer to replace Lurie and Bradley, but did not specify who, and that together they were developing ten episodes in total. However, by July 2024, New Zealand writer Anthony McCarten was officially confirmed to have been hired to work on the project, with Emmerich considering shooting it in Ireland. In September 2024, Emmerich revealed that he and McCarten had developed a three-season plan for the series.

=== Emergence ===
On June 7, 2013, Emmerich's Centropolis Entertainment acquired the science fiction invasion pitch Emergence by Nic Kelman, which Emmerich planned to direct.

=== Untitled arctic thriller film ===
On April 3, 2014, it was announced that Emmerich and his Centropolis Entertainment company had acquired the rights to an untitled action thriller spec script by Nicolas Wright and James A. Woods, set on a diving ship in the Arctic. Emmerich was reportedly eyeing the project as a potential directing vehicle, but that had not yet been determined due to his commitments to Stonewall and Independence Day: Resurgence.

=== Maya Lord ===
On April 28, 2014, Emmerich's Centropolis Entertainment acquired film rights for an adaptation of the historical epic Maya Lord, about Gonzalo Guerrero. On February 14, 2018, it was announced that Centropolis would co-produce the project with Voltage Pictures, who would also handle international sales for the film, with Angela Workman writing the screenplay; it was also reported that Emmerich planned to shoot the project back-to-back with Midway, with production aiming to begin filming by September 1, 2018. In 2022, Emmerich reaffirmed his intentions to make the film someday, calling it "th[e] story of the only good conquistador."

=== New Angeles TV series ===
On September 9, 2014, Emmerich was set to produce Gregg Hurwitz’s sci-fi TV series New Angeles through Slingshot Global Media, with Keanu Reeves attached to produce the series and potentially star in the series and Emmerich directing the pilot episode.

=== Dark Matter ===
On December 15, 2016, Emmerich was in talks to direct the film adaptation of Blake Crouch's sci-fi thriller novel Dark Matter for Sony Pictures, with Matt Tolmach producing. The project was ultimately produced as a television series for Apple TV+, with Crouch serving as showrunner and without the involvement of Emmerich.

== 2020s ==
=== Untitled mistaken identity film ===
In 2022, when asked what scripts he would like to make next, Emmerich revealed a "mistaken identity" period piece he had always wanted to make set in 1919 about a young writer having to take control of a film set.

=== Exodus ===
In 2024, Emmerich revealed that a script for a planned "spiritual sequel" to The Day After Tomorrow, titled Exodus, was being worked on.

== Offers ==
=== Untitled James Bond film ===
In 1997, it was reported that Sony Pictures had approached Emmerich and Dean Devlin to serve as director and producer, respectively, of a new James Bond film inspired by Thunderball, with the intention of potentially starting a new series of Bond films. However, by January 1998, it was reported that Emmerich and Devlin were holding off on committing to the project, owing to uncertainty about the legal issues surrounding the project after Metro-Goldwyn-Mayer filed a lawsuit against Sony over their plans to develop a rival series of Bond films.
