= Dragon's Gate =

- Developer: Adventures Unlimited Software Inc.
- Publishers: GEnie, AOL, Mythic Realms, independent
- Engine: Aradath
- Platform: Platform independent
- Release: 1990
- Genre: Fantasy MUD
- Mode: Multiplayer

Dragon's Gate was an interactive, real time, text-based multi user online fantasy role-playing game, sometimes referred to as a MUD. It was one of the longest running pay-for-play online games in the world, it opened to the public in the spring of 1990 on GEnie. In 1996 the game was moved to AOL. Later the game was moved to Mythic Realms, and finally to independent server, where it ran until the summer of 2007. The game has recently resurfaced and has been brought back on line independently. The new website is https://dragons-gate.com/

== History ==
At its creation, the core of Dragon's Gate was based on the AUSI-entitled game Aradath, which was programmed and designed in 1985 by Mark Jacobs. Dragon's Gate was originally developed by Mark Jacobs and Darrin Hyrup, who had joined AUSI from Simutronics where he had been a programmer on GemStone II and lead programmer on Orb Wars. Dragon's Gate was launched on GEnie in late 1989 and was eventually taken up by AOL as an online product.

Hyrup's initial work on the game was to help port the game to GEnie's Mark III operating system, though in the end, the resulting game was more of a new creation than a port. That partnership led to Hyrup becoming an integral part of AUSI as well as the evolution of the game from Aradath to Dragon's Gate on GEnie and to its other homes.

Jacobs and Hyrup, along with partner Rob Denton, later formed a company in 1995 called Interworld Productions, which in 1997 was renamed as Mythic Entertainment. In 1997 Hyrup and Lori Silva (now Lori Hyrup) joined forces, Darrin as the producer/lead programmer and Lori as an associate producer/lead game designer. In 1998, programming was taken over by Roy Sutton, and in 1999 lead game design was passed on to Colin Johanson. Mythic Entertainment is currently best known for the MMORPG Warhammer Online and Dark Age of Camelot. In June 2006, Mythic Entertainment was purchased by Electronic Arts.

In January 2006, Mythic Entertainment dropped a number of games from its services and official sponsoring, including Dragon's Gate. After being rescued by Darrin and returned to service as a free game running from his basement, the game was taken back down again a year later after a lightning storm damaged the server equipment.

== Production overview ==
Like other games of its kind, Dragon's Gate was based on ideas similar to popular fantasy stories (such as The Lord of the Rings and Dungeons & Dragons). Each player created a character and assumed the identity of that character while participating. Role-playing allowed interaction between PCs (player characters) and NPCs (non-player characters in the form of computer-controlled creatures including monsters and merchants among others) within a simulated environment, which runs in a real-time framework, allowing for an extremely immersive experience. Among the possible game events are numerous GM (game master) or player-run scenarios which variously consist of adventuring, completing quests, fighting in gladiatorial sports, and making new friends with other players.

A player character could be of any one of several classes and races and be individualized in many ways, similar to more modern MMORPGs. Throughout the gaming process, players quickly learned about the way the world functions and how to adventure (usually in search of things like loot, glory, fame, and fortune) either alone or with other players. The game is specifically designed to emphasize its role-playing aspects, and to this end the developers have de-emphasized the statistics, although they are still an integral part of the way the game works, and some statistics with numbers are still shown, but are kept to an absolute minimum. Life in the game continues 24 hours a day, and events continue to occur without requiring the direct intervention of players, a concept commonly referred to as "persistence".

According to the official website: "The world is rich with political and religious strife and has a detailed history. It is very easy to get involved and immersed in role-play. Dragon's Gate allows you to experience an exciting world designed to be more than just a text adventure. As a social gaming system, Dragon's Gate is intended to be fun".

== Reception ==
Ken St. Andre wrote in Computer Gaming World in 1992 that "gamers who like medieval fantasy ... will positively love the Dragon's Gate experience". He said that the opportunity to interact and cooperate with other players, and "unparalleled opportunity for extensive role-playing" were its main virtues, and called the cost of $6 per hour "a very reasonable price for being transported into a world of alien wonder and adventure".
