= Joey (1985 film) =

1985 film

- American theatrical release poster
- Directed by: Roland Emmerich
- Written by: Roland Emmerich; Hans J. Haller; Thomas Lechner
- Produced by: Willi Segler; Alena Rimbach; James Melkonian
- Starring: Joshua Morrell; Eva Kryll; Jan Zierold; Tammy Shields; Barbara Klein; Matthias Kraus
- Cinematography: Egon Werdin
- Edited by: Carl Colpaert; Alan Toomayan; Tomy Wigand
- Music by: Paul Gilreath
- Production company: Centropolis Film Productions
- Distributed by: New World Pictures
- Release dates: November 21, 1985 (West Germany); December 27, 1985 (United States)
- Running time: 98 minutes
- Country: West Germany
- Language: German (Shot in English)
- Budget: $1.5 million

Joey, known as Making Contact in the United States, is a 1985 West German techno-horror-fantasy film from Centropolis Film Productions (now Centropolis Entertainment). The film was co-written and directed by Roland Emmerich.

== Plot ==
A 9-year-old boy named Joey Collins loses his father, but makes contact with what he believes is his deceased parent via a small phone and is terrorized by a possessed ventriloquist dummy named Fletcher. The doll summons demons and evil forces to threaten Joey's friends, mother, and enemies. Joey must go into the spirit world to destroy the evil doll in a battle of good vs. evil. The boy develops the power of telekinesis, which soon gets out of hand.

== Cast ==
- Joshua Morrell as Joey Collins
- Eva Kryll as Laura Collins
- Jan Zierold as Martin
- Tammy Shields as Sally
- Barbara Klein as Haiden
- Matthias Kraus as Bernie
- Jack Angel as Fletcher The Dummy (voice)

== Production ==
Director and co-writer Roland Emmerich said of the production:

I want to make entertaining movies for a broad audience. Germany needs a film industry again. Making 'artsy' movies may be nice for the ego, but it will not feed an industry. Entertaining the masses is the foundation, and that has been neglected here for a long time. People like Spielberg and Lucas are showing the way. Why shouldn't we go in the same direction? We can do it too, and we can do it cheaper!

The film took a year and a half to make and Emmerich kept costs down by building his own effects studio in an abandoned factory instead of using a more expensive established effects house. In order to shoot the film in English, Emmerich recruited several of his actors from an American Military base in Germany. Completion of the film was delayed after Emmerich was dissatisfied with the initial effects work and opted to scrap the already finished effects work in order to fully redo it.

== Release ==
Joey was released in North America as Making Contact. The North American version was heavily cut and ran 79 minutes. Despite mainly negative reviews the film was able to recoup its budget in Germany alone and generated further profits from foreign sales. Joey was subsequently released as a 2 disc DVD set featuring the original 98 minute version along with the edited North American cut. In 2017, Kino Lorber released the US cut on Blu-ray.

Critical reception in Germany was predominantly negative with critics dubbing Roland Emmerich "Spielbergle" (meaning "little Spielberg") due to Emmerich's usage of Spielbergian tropes popularized by American Blockbusters.

Making Contact was riffed for the 2022 Mystery Science Theater 3000 LIVE: Time Bubble Tour.
