= The Escapist (magazine) =

American video game magazine

- Cover of first issue
- Website type: Video game website
- Available in: English
- Owners: Themis Media (2005–2018); Enthusiast Gaming (2018–2022); Gamurs Group (2022–2025); Clickout Media (2025–present)
- Website: escapistmagazine.com
- Launched: July 12, 2005; 21 years ago

The Escapist (formerly known as Escapist Magazine) is an American video game website and online magazine. First published as a weekly online magazine by Themis Media on July 12, 2005, The Escapist eventually pivoted to a traditional web journalism format. In 2018, Escapist Magazine launched Volume Two, a rehauled website in conjunction with its purchase by Enthusiast Gaming. The site name reverted to The Escapist in April 2020. Gamurs Group acquired the site in September 2022. The company's entire video production team resigned to form Second Wind in November 2023 after editor-in-chief Nick Calandra was fired. In 2025 Gamurs Group sold the site to Clickout Media, who changed the site's focus to online gambling.

== History ==
=== 2005–2011: Founding and popularity ===
The Escapist was conceived as a PDF-format magazine by Themis Media, whose president Alexander Macris had previously found success with its sister site WarCry Network. Editor-in-chief Julianne Greer had not been involved in the gaming industry before The Escapist, and had a background in marketing and new media.

The premier issue featured pieces from well-known gaming-community authors including Jerry Holkins, Kieron Gillen, and John Scott Tynes. Following issues included work by Tom Chick, Allen Varney, Jim Rossignol and other top writers from in and outside the game industry, including a four-part piece by leading game designer Warren Spector. According to Themis, by late 2006 the website had 150,000 monthly readers. The website MMORPG.com noted that the webzine had become the "flagship brand" for Themis, which runs other websites and ventures related to the gaming industry, with the reputation of "a widely read and highly respected form of game journalism" and "paying writers top dollar".

On July 9, 2007, the site relaunched with a completely new design, which also saw the end of the weekly PDF issues and a shift in layout to one more similar to other websites. Although the weekly topic and publish schedule was retained, new regular content additions included more game reviews, editorial articles, conference coverage, and a relaunch of Shoot Club by Tom Chick.

The most notable addition to the content lineup was Zero Punctuation, a weekly animated review series that led to a four-fold increase in web traffic. Within the next four years, The Escapist contracted several creators including LoadingReadyRun, Miracle of Sound, and Bob "MovieBob" Chipman, as well as helping launch Extra Credits as a rebrand of its creators' videos.

In 2010, The Escapist launched a membership service called the Publisher's Club which for $20 a year removed advertisements from the site, conferred forum benefits and entry into special contests.

=== 2011–2018: Dispute and decline ===
Around the end of July 2011, there was a dispute between The Escapist and James Portnow, co-creator of Extra Credits. After not being paid for months, the Extra Credits team needed to pay for surgery for their artist, Allison Theus. They began a charity fund on RocketHub, separate from The Escapist, and received substantially more money than was necessary for Theus's surgery. They planned to use this extra money to create a game publishing label, where the revenue would go directly into funding subsequent projects. Alexander Macris, owner and co-founder of The Escapist, stated the money should have been used to create more episodes of Extra Credits for The Escapist and to compensate Themis Media for donation incentives, such as premium memberships and T-shirts.

During the dispute, a number of other contracted creators spoke out in support of Extra Credits, relaying similar stories of mistreatment by the management. Among them were MovieBob, James Stephanie Sterling, LoadingReadyRun, and the creators of No Right Answer. Later, those creators would also break ties with The Escapist, leaving Ben "Yahtzee" Croshaw as the sole contracted creator by 2017. As a result, Extra Credits broke ties with The Escapist, moving to Penny Arcade and later becoming independent.

Macris would later become involved with the sale of Themis Media to Alloy Digital, as well as supporting the Gamergate controversy in 2014 by openly adopting stricter policies.

On November 15, 2012, it was announced that Themis Media had been acquired by Alloy Digital for an undisclosed sum. For a few years afterwards, Alloy cross-promoted Smosh Games on The Escapist. In 2014, Alloy Digital merged with Break Media to form Defy Media, with a consolidated portfolio that did not mention The Escapist.

On January 21, 2015, Defy Media announced it was cutting staff across a portfolio of its main sites including The Escapist, GameTrailers and GameFront. In 2016, The Escapist laid off a 'number of employees' and shuttered its main office in Durham, North Carolina leaving the website's main operation out of Seattle.

By late 2017, the site was reduced to Croshaw, a small streaming team and the editor-in-chief with the closure of the site seeming imminent as the community volunteers were the only contributors to the site besides Croshaw.

=== 2018–2022: Enthusiast and relaunch ===
In July 2018, The Escapist was purchased by Enthusiast Gaming, owner of Destructoid, and a relaunch was announced with former editor-in-chief Russ Pitts at the helm. These changes came into effect September 2018, along with a website name change to Escapist Magazine Volume Two. The Big Picture, produced by MovieBob, was the first series to be officially relaunched alongside the continued Zero Punctuation.

Following a Twitter exchange with Zoë Quinn over a now-deleted article about Gamergate, Russ Pitts announced he would be taking a "voluntary leave of absence" from The Escapist in February 2019. Nick Calandra, who joined the site in 2019 as the managing director of video, replaced Pitts as editor-in-chief in July 2019.

In April 2020, the site name reverted to The Escapist. The site also launched The Escapist +, which allows readers to view the site without advertisements. Management under Calandra saw a surge in original content as the site transitioned from a gaming news focus to gaming commentary. In October 2020, Bob Chipman's contract with The Escapist was not renewed. Later in October, the Escapist Movies YouTube channel was relaunched. In April 2021, the Escapist Plays YouTube channel was relaunched as "The Escapist Live". In May 2021, the Escapist Movies YouTube channel merges with the main Escapist YouTube channel.

=== 2022–present: Gamurs Group and Clickout Media ===
Enthusiast Gaming sold the website to Gamurs Group in September 2022. On November 6, 2023, Calandra alleged he was fired from Gamurs Group, citing "not achieving goals" as the justification. The entire video team, including Croshaw, resigned to form an employee-owned outlet, Second Wind; Gamurs kept the rights to Zero Punctuation among other Escapist properties. In July 2025, Gamurs sold The Escapist to Clickout Media.

Under Clickout Media, The Escapist initially refocused its content to create reviews of online casinos and other gambling-related promotions. They uploaded numerous gambling clips to the Escapist YouTube channel, which were removed in April 2026.

In March 2026, Clickout Media laid off the majority of The Escapist staff, keeping only a skeleton crew assisted by "AI editors" to create content. The site is currently led by former Amiga Action and PlayStation Pro editor Paul McNally, and hosts a mix of gaming features, often on more niche titles, and AI-generated guides for online casinos.

== The Escapist Games Showcase ==
The Escapist Indie Showcase was held from June 11–14, 2020 focusing on indie games. The main showcase video was aired first on June 11 and used the "direct" format, as well as featuring messages from the developers behind the games. Streams were held after the showcase where The Escapist team played some of the games while interviewing their developers live. They partnered with GOG for the event. The Escapist Games Showcase was held from November 10–12, 2020, as part of the digital EGLX event.

== Awards ==
In May 2008, The Escapist won the Webby Award and 2008 People's Choice Award for Best Video-Game Related Website. The Escapist also won this award in 2009 after a protracted voting battle between the members of The Escapist and the website GameSpot. In 2011 The Escapist again won three Webby Awards: Best Games-Related Website, People's Voice Best Games-Related Website and People's Voice Best Lifestyle Website. The Escapist also received a Mashable Open Web Award for Best Online Magazine in 2009 and was named one of the 50 Best Websites by Time magazine in 2011.
