= The Visitor (TV series) =

- Genre: Science fiction
- Created by: Dean Devlin; Roland Emmerich
- Written by: Norman Morrill; Ayn Carrillo; Samuel W. Gailey; Jean Gennis; Phyllis Murphy; Hans Tobeason
- Directed by: Kevin Kerslake; Randall Zisk
- Starring: John Corbett; Grand L. Bush; Steve Railsback
- Theme music composer: David Arnold
- Composer: Kevin Kiner
- Country of origin: United States
- Original language: English
- No. of seasons: 1
- No. of episodes: 13

Production
- Executive producers: Dean Devlin; Roland Emmerich; John Masius
- Producers: Norman Morrill; Scott White
- Cinematography: John S. Bartley
- Editors: Peter S. Elliot; Fred Peterson; Noel Rogers; Ron Rosen
- Running time: 60 minutes
- Production companies: Centropolis Television; 20th Television

Original release
- Network: Fox
- Release: September 19, 1997 – January 16, 1998

The Visitor is an American science fiction television series created by Roland Emmerich and Dean Devlin which was produced by Centropolis Television and 20th Television that aired on Fox from September 19, 1997 to January 16, 1998. It stars John Corbett as Adam McArthur, who was abducted by extraterrestrials 50 years earlier and escapes back to Earth to help improve life for humanity.

The series was created in parallel with the world's first webshows, the now defunct Thevisitor.com, which featured alternate characters, interweaving storylines and early use of DHTML animation. The premise of The Visitor is similar to the 2004 television series The 4400.

== Overview ==
Fifty years prior to the outset of the show Adam MacArthur is abducted by aliens in the Bermuda Triangle during World War II. Upon his escape and subsequent return to Earth, he finds that not only is he still the young man he was 50 years before, but he also has special powers. During his abduction, aliens managed to tap into a largely unused portion of his brain which left Adam with the power to heal and bring people back to life. He also acquired several other strange abilities.

In the series, he claims that all people have the power to do this but simply don't know how. Most episodes see Adam travelling America and making the lives of people better by using both his deductive reasoning and his special powers. He's driven by what he feels to be a quest to change the lives of strangers.

Adam used a small ship to travel back to Earth and continues to use the ship for travel purposes employing a device the size of a television remote to control it. When not in use, Adam usually hides his ship from view.

A Colonel from the U.S. Army, James Vise, is concerned about Adam's presence on Earth. He spends most episodes attempting to capture what he perceives to be a threat to U.S. security. FBI agents Wilcox, Larue and Van Patten are also after Adam; however, they don't see him as a threat, but rather want to question him about his disappearance. They often clash with Vise's group. Adam is also being chased by otherworldly forces. Apparently, the aliens abducted a few humans as part of an experiment; Adam being one of them. Since Adam's escape back to Earth, the aliens are attempting to track him down in order to resume their tests.

In the end, Adam convinces his "abductors" that he has a mission to complete on Earth and thus is given the opportunity to save mankind. Vise, who was killed during his struggle to capture Adam, is revived by the one who he saw as a threat and is saved by him. Adam convinces him to find another purpose in his second chance in life. However, the ending is somewhat open because after Vise's "death", new questions rise. In addition, FBI agents Wilcox, Larue and Van Patten are reassigned (or forced to resign) after the trio's encounter with Adam and Vise.

As a show where the main character is travelling to different locations in each episode, the show doesn't feature a large cast of primary characters. Similarly to shows like The X-Files, most episodes feature a supporting cast that appears for just a single episode.

== Characters ==
- John Corbett as Adam MacArthur
- Grand L. Bush as Agent Douglas Wilcox
- Leon Rippy as Agent Nicholas LaRue
- John Storey as Agent Craig Van Patten
- Steve Railsback as Colonel James Vise

== Episodes ==
No.	Title	Directed by	Written by	Original release date	Prod. code	Viewers (millions)
1	"Pilot"	Kevin Kerslake	Dean Devlin & Roland Emmerich	September 19, 1997	5R01	12.57
Crash-landing on a mountain side, THE VISITOR (formerly Adam MacArthur) mysteriously emerges from the wreckage of the downed craft, seemingly unhurt. His sudden appearance creates a manhunt by opposing national security departments (including the FBI, headed by Douglas Wilcox, and the NSA, headed by Colonel James Vise), each with its own agenda to find out who Adam is, how he survived, and why he returned. It appears that Adam, missing in action since World War II, is still the young man he was 50 years ago prior to disappearing into the Bermuda Triangle. Adam eludes his pursuers by finding refuge with Nadine and Tyler Walden, a single mother and her 13-year-old son.
2	"Fear of Flying"	Randall Zisk	Story by : Dean Devlin & Roland Emmerich & John Masius; Teleplay by : Dean Devlin & John Masius	September 26, 1997	5R02	8.28
Adam MacArthur helps repressed and banished scientist Louis Farraday realize his life-long project to conquer gravity. Chased by both the FBI and Vise, they utilize this discovery to make their escape in a vintage World War II fighter plane.
3	"The Devil's Rainbow"	Donna Deitch	Hans Tobeason	October 3, 1997	5R03	8.98
Adam MacArthur connects with his adult granddaughter while Vise and the FBI are hot on his trail.
4	"Dreams"	Tucker Gates	Ed Gold	October 10, 1997	5R05	8.22
Adam MacArthur is tormented by a message received from deep space. He and scientist Alex Burton try to decipher the message, but in a moment of synchronicity, both men are seriously injured and sent into a coma. They must try to navigate through their shared dream landscape and ultimately realize that the message may have dire consequences.
5	"Remember"	Allan Arkush	Valerie & Vivian Mayhew	October 17, 1997	5R04	7.18
Adam joins a community of lost souls and discovers that they are waiting for an alien mothership to save them. Upon further investigation, he learns that the group's leader is developing a weapon that can cause mass destruction by ""canceling"" human brain wave activity. Adam must convince the young scientist working on the weapon to abandon the project before it's too late and turn his talents to aiding humanity.
6	"The Black Box"	Frederick King Keller	Norman Morrill	October 24, 1997	5R06	8.21
To prevent a catastrophe, Adam urgently searches for mysterious objects that disappeared 30 years ago in a science lab accident. To find the objects, he befriends the Vietnam vet and his college sweetheart who survived the accident. As he tries to re-unite them, Adam finds himself in a race with time.
7	"Teufelsnacht (Devil Night)"	Davis Guggenheim	Hans Tobeason	October 31, 1997	5R07	7.45
A radio DJ doing his annual ""War of the Worlds"" show on Halloween night witnesses the landing of an alien space craft, but no one believes him. Meanwhile, Adam knows the pilot of the unusual machine is looking for him and gets the help of two young siblings to help him avoid capture.
8	"Reunion"	Tony Bill	Valerie & Vivian Mayhew	November 7, 1997	5R08	7.50
Things reach crisis point when Adam, his granddaughter Charlotte, Michael O'Ryan, and the FBI all converge to find Constance MacArthur, Adam's wife. While Adam is desperate to see his wife who he left in 1947, Michael O'Ryan will stop at nothing to prevent him from completing his mission on Earth and kidnaps Charlotte as bait. Meanwhile, the FBI closes in on Adam and Colonel Vise finally goes over the edge.
9	"Caged"	Kevin Kerslake	Dean Devlin	November 14, 1997	5R09	8.27
The FBI finally catches up to Adam and takes him to a federal prison for questioning. Meanwhile, Col. Vise experiences flashbacks of the experience that started his alien obsession. As they try to capture Adam, Michael O'Ryan discloses himself to Vise as his long lost friend.
10	"Going Home"	Randall Zisk	Edward Gold & Todd A. Kessler	December 5, 1997	5R10	7.22
After his escape from the FBI, Adam must get Michael O'Ryan and his craft back to their home or Earth will be endangered. Col. Vise has other plans, forcing Adam to go back to the FBI for help.
11	"Miracles"	Patrick Norris	Norman Morrill	December 19, 1997	5R12	6.74
With the holidays approaching, Adam searches for a member of his family, but is delayed by a woman about to give birth. With the FBI and NSA hot on his trail, Adam helps the woman connect with her estranged scientist grandfather.
12	"The Chain"	Ian Toynton	Ayn Carrillo & Samuel W. Gailey	January 9, 1998	5R11	6.99
A frightened psychic woman foresees a terrible event that will affect humankind and Adam shows her how to use her special abilities to prevent the chain of events from unfolding. Meanwhile, Col. Vise is diagnosed with a bizarre illness.
13	"The Trial"	Timothy Van Patten	Jean Gennis & Phyllis Murphy	January 16, 1998	5R13	7.37
Just when the FBI and NSA finally catch up to Adam, he is abducted by an alien spaceship right before their eyes. On board, Adam discovers that he was taken by a group of fellow abductees who put him on trial for his actions on Earth. Adam must defend why he disobeyed the "Elders" rules on non-intervention and justify his mission to the others.
