= Godzilla Online =

1998 video game

- Developers: Mythic Entertainment; Centropolis Interactive
- Publisher: Centropolis Interactive
- Producer: Matt Firor
- Platform: Windows
- Release: November 1998

Godzilla Online was a 1998 multiplayer video game developed by Mythic Entertainment and Centropolis Interactive. The game was released exclusively on the online gaming service GameStorm.

== Gameplay ==
A screenshot depicting playing as Baby Godzilla

Players could take the role of soldiers who were set to kill baby Godzillas, scientists who wanted to extract blood from baby Godzillas, baby Godzillas who wanted to defend themselves from threats and strived to be big Godzillas, and reporters who wanted to film the ongoing chaos. There were free-for-all, team deathmatch and capture-the-flag style Eggstatica, Escape from NYC and last man standing game modes.

== Development ==
The game was first announced in May 1998 and was in development for nearly a year. The title was showcased at E3 1998. Dean Devlin producer and co-writer for the 1998 Godzilla film was involved in the project.

== Reception ==
Reception

Review score
Publication	Score
Computer Gaming World	2/5

Computer Gaming World gave the game a score of 2 out of 5 stating "The gameplay; the sound; and the software-only, third-person graphics are pretty basic and you can't even alter your view. Somehow it all comes off as a massively multiplayer, third-rate DIABLO. And you don't even get to trash the Brooklyn Bridge"
