= WarCry Network =

Video game fan website

- Website type: Gaming culture and news site
- Owner: Defy Media
- Website: http://www.warcry.com/
- Commercial: no
- Registration: not required
- Launched: May 21, 1999
- Current status: Inactive

WarCry Network (or WarCry.com per the URL) was a web portal centered on the MMO (massively multiplayer online) genre of video games. It boasted a large community of professional web sites and databases for these games. One of the regular features at WarCry.com were exclusive interviews with game developers and game company executives.

Previously associated closely with its sister site The Escapist, WarCry was deactivated in late 2018 during the liquidation of its owner, Defy Media.

== History ==
The company known as WarCry Corp. was started in 1997 by Alexander Macris. Originally a developer and publisher of online games, in 2001 WarCry acquired the assets of Crossroads Gaming Network (also known as XRGaming) in an undisclosed private transaction. The merged company took the WarCry name, but dropped the online gaming angle to concentrate on more coverage of games, particularly massively multiplayer which had been XRGaming's stock in trade. Whilst popular, XRGaming had been suffering in the midst of the dot-com bust and WarCry's funding enabled both to survive.

=== Themis Group ===
Macris and Thomas Kurz founded Themis Group in August 2001 as a consulting firm for MMOG developers. Initially, Themis and WarCry were considered separate by Macris, who had sold his stake in WarCry.

On July 12, 2005, Themis launched The Escapist, a weekly online magazine with Macris taking the role of publisher. By 2007, WarCry and The Escapist began using the same web software and similar layouts throughout their parallel life cycle. During this time, the company was split into two divisions: TAP Interactive, a continuation of the consulting firm; and Themis Media, an umbrella division for the websites.

On October 6, 2008, Themis Group announced they would be consolidating TAP Interactive into Themis Media, thus putting all their efforts into WarCry and The Escapist.

=== Acquisition and Decline ===
Themis Group was purchased by Alloy Digital (later Defy Media) in 2012.

While The Escapist was purchased by Enthusiast Gaming in July 2018, the deal did not include WarCry. With the closure of Defy Media in November 2018, WarCry was taken offline.

== Coverage ==
The WarCry Network specialized in covering numerous popular MMOGs. The network itself had numerous daughter sites dedicated to covering almost all aspects of the games it covers. It has specific database pages for no less than 29 different online games, including extremely popular games such as World of Warcraft, Everquest 2, Lineage II, City of Heroes and even the aging Dark Age of Camelot. The WarCry network now covers games, movies, anime, comics and other parts of the entertainment industry, supplied by a network of contributors and user-submitted content. Similar to many print gaming magazines, the WarCry network conducted its own "Editor's Choice Awards" in 2006.

Some of their contemporaries included TenTonHammer.com, IGN's Vault Network, Stratics and the Coldfront Gaming Network.

== Impact ==
Many gaming news sites index and/or link to articles that were originally published on WarCry. Some of the editorials published on the network have been used as sources by other articles as well. Many of their interviews with game developers have been referenced to by other online news sites.

Some official game websites have considered the network significant enough so as to reference them on their official websites. For example, Lineage II's news site stated that WarCry had exclusive coverage of their "Lineage II Battle Tournament". Paris-based NEVRAX, makers of the massively-multiplayer online game The Saga of Ryzom, has also mentioned the WarCry Network in an official press release, alongside notable industry news sources such as GameSpy and Computer Gaming World.

In light of their 2006 Editor's Choice Awards, many game developers have also acknowledged the network on their own official websites. Cryptic Studios, makers of the massively multiplayer City of Heroes and Marvel Universe Online games referenced their Editor's Choice Award on their official news site. Another major MMOG, EVE Online, acknowledged WarCry for naming their Revelations expansion, "Expansion of the Year" on their front page.
