= Roland Emmerich =

German-American filmmaker (born 1955)

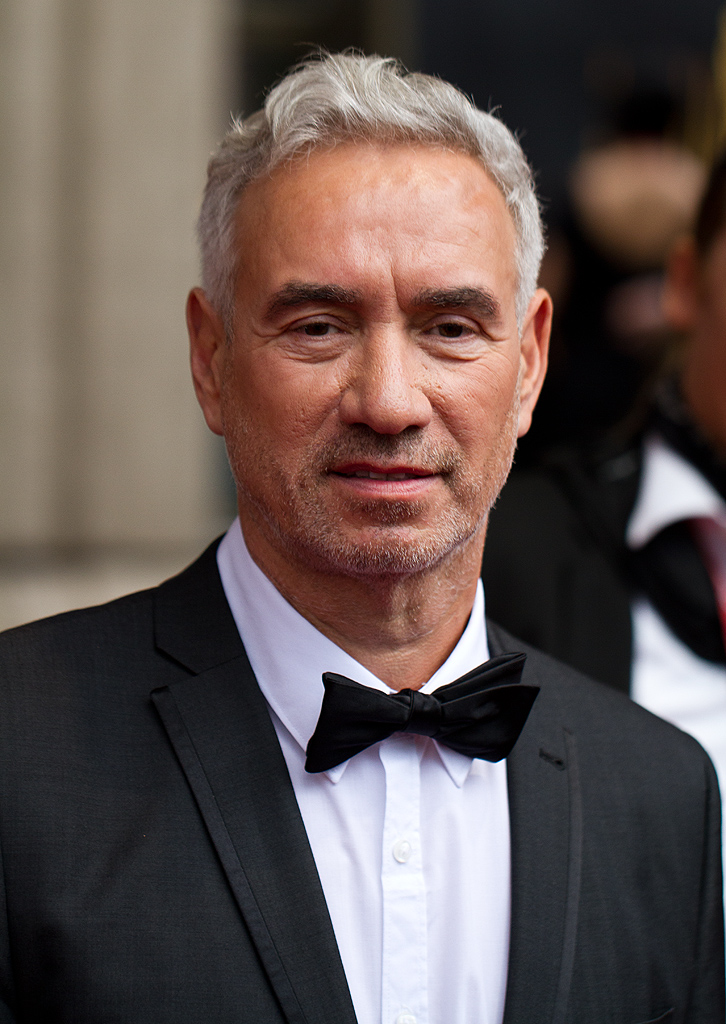
- Emmerich in 2012
- Born: 10 November 1955 (age 70); Stuttgart, West Germany
- Citizenship: Germany; United States
- Education: University of Television and Film Munich
- Occupations: Film director; producer; screenwriter
- Years active: 1979–present
- Spouse: Omar De Soto (m. 2017)

Roland Emmerich (German: [ˈʁoːlant ˈɛməʁɪç]; born 10 November 1955) is a German and American filmmaker. He is known for his science fiction and disaster films and has been called a "master of disaster" within the movie industry. His films, most of which are English-language Hollywood productions released to mixed reviews, have made more than $3 billion worldwide, including just over $1 billion in the United States, making him the 20th-highest-grossing Hollywood director of all time.

Emmerich began his work in the film industry by directing the film The Noah's Ark Principle (1984) as part of his university thesis and also co-founded Centropolis Entertainment in 1985 with his sister. He has subsequently directed the films Universal Soldier (1992), Stargate (1994), Independence Day (1996), Godzilla (1998), The Patriot (2000), The Day After Tomorrow (2004), 10,000 BC (2008), 2012 (2009), White House Down (2013), Stonewall (2015), Independence Day: Resurgence (2016), Midway (2019), and Moonfall (2022).

== Early life and career ==
Emmerich was born in Stuttgart, West Germany, and grew up in the nearby town of Sindelfingen. As a youth, he traveled extensively throughout Europe and North America on vacations financed by his father, Hans, the wealthy founder of a garden machinery production company. In 1977, he began attending University of Television and Film Munich with the intention of studying to become a production designer. After watching Star Wars, he instead decided to enroll in the school's film director program. Required to create a short film as his final thesis in 1981, he wrote and directed the full-length feature The Noah's Ark Principle, which was screened as the opening film of the 34th Berlin International Film Festival in 1984.

In 1985, he founded Centropolis Film Productions (now Centropolis Entertainment) in partnership with his sister, producer Ute Emmerich, and directed his major film debut, a fantasy feature named Joey. He subsequently directed the 1987 comedy Hollywood-Monster and the 1990 science-fiction film Moon 44. Theatrically, these were only released in and near his native country, although Emmerich filmed them in English and went against conventional German styles in an attempt to appeal to a larger market. This subsequently resulted in Moon 44 being released direct-to-video in the U.S. in early 1991. Joey and Hollywood-Monster eventually also saw home video releases in the U.S. (as Making Contact and Ghost Chase, respectively) once Emmerich achieved more prominence in America.

== Hollywood director ==
=== 1990s ===
Producer Mario Kassar invited Emmerich to come to the United States to direct a futuristic action film entitled Isobar. Dean Devlin, who appeared in Moon 44, soon joined Emmerich as his writing and producing partner, and served in this capacity until 2000. Emmerich subsequently refused the offer to direct after producers rejected Devlin's re-write of the script, and the Isobar project was eventually scrapped. Instead, Emmerich was hired to replace director Andrew Davis for the action movie Universal Soldier. The film was released in 1992.

Emmerich next directed the 1994 science-fiction film Stargate. At the time, it set a record for the highest-grossing opening weekend for a film released in the month of October. It became more commercially successful than most film industry insiders had anticipated, and spawned a highly popular media franchise.

Emmerich then directed Independence Day, an alien invasion feature, released in 1996, that became the first film to gross $100 million in less than a week and went on to become one of the most financially successful films of all time, at one point having been the second-highest-grossing film in terms of worldwide box office. Emmerich and Devlin then created the television series The Visitor, which aired on the Fox Network during 1997–1998 before being cancelled after one season.

His next film, Godzilla, opened in 1998. An extensive advertising and marketing campaign generated significant hype during the months leading up to the film's release. The film was a box office success but was met with negative reviews from critics and fans. It garnered a Saturn Award for Best Special Effects, a BMI Film Music Award, and the Audience Award for Best Director at the European Film Awards while also receiving a Razzie Award for Worst Remake or Sequel. It has only a 16% rating on Rotten Tomatoes. Emmerich said that prior to getting involved with Godzilla he and Devlin had planned a disaster movie centered around an asteroid fall, which wound up cancelled after Armageddon went for a similar idea.

=== 2000s ===
Taking a short break from science-fiction, Emmerich next directed the American Revolutionary War epic The Patriot (2000). One of only five films (Universal Soldier, Anonymous, White House Down, and Midway being the others) Emmerich has directed in which he did not contribute to the screenplay, the film received a generally favorable critical and commercial response, and is Emmerich's best-reviewed film to date. After teaming up with new screenwriting partner Harald Kloser, Emmerich returned once again to directing a visual effects-laden adventure with 2004's blockbuster The Day After Tomorrow, another disaster film about a rapidly oncoming ice age brought upon by the effects of global warming. Soon afterward, he founded Reelmachine, another film production company based in Germany.

In 2008, Emmerich directed 10,000 BC, a film about the journeys of a prehistoric tribe of mammoth hunters. It was a box office hit, but consistently regarded by professional critics as his worst film, as well as one of the worst films of the year. He was slated to direct a remake of the 1966 science-fiction film Fantastic Voyage, but he eventually left project, due to clashing with its producer James Cameron. In 2009, Emmerich directed 2012, an apocalyptic disaster film based on the conspiracy theory that the ancient Mayans prophesying that the world would end on 21 December 2012. Despite mixed reviews, the film went on to be his second-highest-grossing film to date (after Independence Day) and received praise from audiences. Emmerich usually finishes production of a large-scale movie both in a time frame shorter and on a budget lower than what is typically requested by other directors.

=== 2010s ===
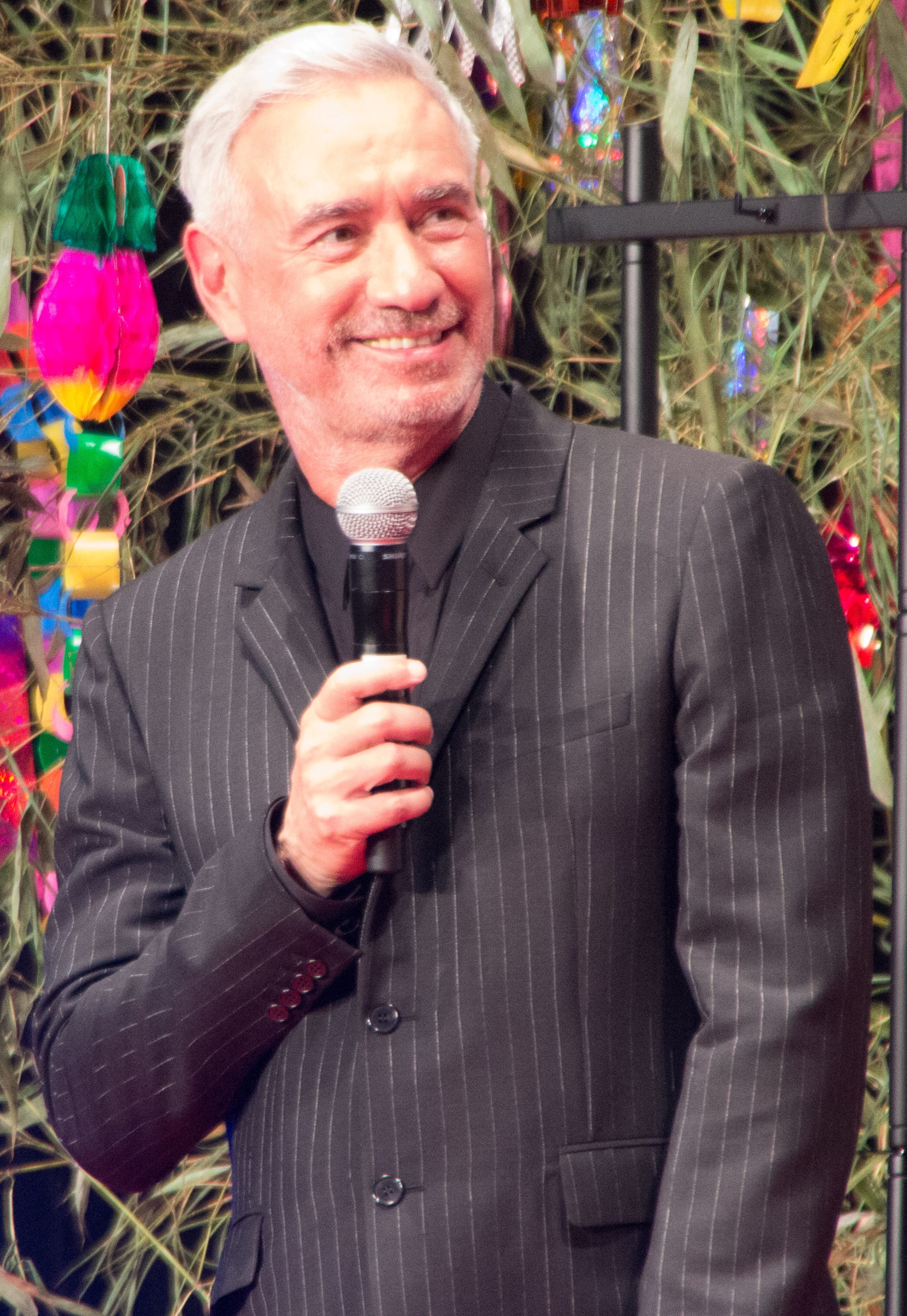
Emmerich in 2016

Emmerich's next film, Anonymous, released on 28 October 2011, is based on the premise that Edward de Vere, 17th Earl of Oxford is the real author of the plays and sonnets of William Shakespeare. According to Emmerich, "It's an historical thriller because it's about who will succeed Queen Elizabeth and the struggle of the people who want to have a hand in it. It's the Tudors on one side and the Cecils on the other, and in between [the two] is the Queen. Through that story we tell how the plays written by the Earl of Oxford ended up labelled 'William Shakespeare.'" The film's box-office failures signaled a decline of Emmerich's career.

In 2011, Sony Pictures had purchased a pitch for Emmerich's project Singularity, a sci-fi epic about a man composed of nanomachines. Originally planned for a 2013 release, the project has since gone into development hell.

Emmerich directed the action-thriller film White House Down, which involved a terrorist attack on the White House by a paramilitary group. The spec script was written by James Vanderbilt and was purchased by Sony Pictures for $3 million in March 2012. The Hollywood Reporter called it "one of the biggest spec sales in quite a while". The journal said the script was similar "tonally and thematically" to the films Die Hard, Air Force One and Olympus Has Fallen (2013). Emmerich began filming in July 2012 at the La Cité Du Cinéma in Montreal, Quebec, Canada. The film was released on 28 June 2013 in the United States.

Whenever asked about making a personal project, Emmerich thought it would be "a gay film", and after friends during production of Anonymous asked if he could make a film on the Stonewall riots, Emmerich got interested in the idea. Stonewall was released in 2015. He followed it with a sequel to his most successful film in Independence Day: Resurgence, released twenty years after the original Independence Day on 24 June 2016.

In November 2019, Emmerich directed the film Midway based on the battle of Midway during the Pacific Theater of World War II.

=== 2020s ===
In 2020, it was announced that Emmerich's next film project would be entitled Moonfall, released in 2022 by Lionsgate. The project is a space disaster film about a mysterious force knocking the moon from its orbit around Earth, sending it on a collision course with the planet. In response, a ragtag team launches a last-ditch mission to land on the lunar surface and save Earth from annihilation. with the production budget standing at $150 million. Afterwards Emmerich made his first television project, Those About to Die, a Peacock series released in 2024. Set in Ancient Rome and featuring a criminal helping Titus Flavius Domitianus ascend to Roman emperor, the show had Emmerich direct half of its ten episodes, while friend and protegé Marco Kreuzpaintner did the other half.

=== Future projects ===
Following the release of Moonfall, Emmerich said he has been working on a TV series based on T. E. Lawrence for around a decade, and stated he has three projects he would like to make, a mistaken identity period piece set in 1919 about a young writer having to take control of a film set, another about a conquistador, and a third about the death of Marilyn Monroe.

In June 2023, Emmerich announced a franchise titled Space Nation which will consist of a MMORPG, a TV series, animated shorts and spinoff games.

== Personal life and advocacy ==
Emmerich owns homes in Los Angeles, New York City, London and Stuttgart. He likes to decorate his homes in a self-described "outlandish" manner, adorning them with rare Hollywood memorabilia, murals and portraits of dictators and Communist figures, and World War II militaria. He is a collector of art. Emmerich's extensive collection of artwork includes a painting of Jesus Christ wearing a Katharine Hamnett-styled T-shirt during his crucifixion, prints of Alison Jackson's works of a Princess Diana lookalike making obscene gestures and engaging in sex acts, a wax sculpture of Pope John Paul II laughing as he reads his own obituary, and a Photoshopped image of Iranian president Mahmoud Ahmadinejad in a homoerotic pose. Emmerich, a financial supporter of U.S. progressive politics, states that the decorations and pieces are not declarations of any beliefs, but rather reflections of his "predilection for art with a political edge".

Emmerich is gay and is an LGBT rights activist. He is married to Omar De Soto. He has stated that he witnessed overt racism when producers and studio executives were opposed to allowing him to cast Will Smith for the lead in Independence Day, and reluctant to allow him to portray an interracial couple in The Day After Tomorrow. He has also stated that he has encountered homophobia from the same groups, and is vocal in his opposition to such behavior. In 2006, he pledged $150,000 to the Legacy Project, a campaign dedicated to gay and lesbian film preservation. Emmerich made the donation on behalf of Outfest, making it the largest gift in the festival's history. In 2007, on behalf of the LGBT community, he held a fundraiser at his Los Angeles home for Democratic Party presidential candidate Hillary Clinton.

In 2011, he became a U.S. citizen while keeping his German citizenship. He stated he did so because he "wanted to have a vote in the next US elections" and that he waited because he "didn’t want to become an American under Bush." He has worked to raise awareness over the issue of global warming. He once was a chain-smoker who was known to smoke as many as four packs of cigarettes a day, Emmerich has often included in his films characters who are trying to quit smoking or warn against the dangers of tobacco use. Along with several other celebrities, he is a producer of The 1 Second Film, a non-profit project intended to raise money for women's rights in the developing world. He is in favor of the campaign for stunt performers to receive recognition at the Academy Awards. Emmerich has stated that sometimes he does "[not like working in] the movie business", describing it as a sometimes "very cold, brutal business", but his motivation to keep directing is that he genuinely "like[s] making movies".

== Filmography ==
In addition to film, Emmerich also directed a one-minute commercial titled "Infinite Possibilities" for DaimlerChrysler.

=== Film ===
Year	Title	Director	Writer	Producer	Note
1980	Franzmann	Yes	Yes	No	
1984	The Noah's Ark Principle	Yes	Yes	Co-producer	
1985	Joey	Yes	Yes	Co-producer	
1987	Hollywood-Monster	Yes	Yes	Yes	
1990	Moon 44	Yes	Story	Yes	
1991	Eye of the Storm	No	No	Executive	
1992	Universal Soldier	Yes	No	No	
1994	Stargate	Yes	Yes	No	
1994	The High Crusade	No	No	Yes	
1996	Independence Day	Yes	Yes	Executive	
1998	Godzilla	Yes	Yes	Executive	
1999	The Thirteenth Floor	No	No	Yes	
2000	The Patriot	Yes	No	Executive	
2002	Eight Legged Freaks	No	No	Executive	
2004	The Day After Tomorrow	Yes	Yes	Yes	
2007	Trade	No	No	Yes	
2008	10,000 BC	Yes	Yes	Yes	
2009	2012	Yes	Yes	Executive	
2011	Anonymous	Yes	No	Yes	
2011	Hell	No	No	Executive	
2012	Last Will & Testament	No	No	Executive	Documentary
2013	White House Down	Yes	No	Yes	
2015	Stonewall	Yes	No	Yes	
2016	Independence Day: Resurgence	Yes	Yes	Yes	
2019	Midway	Yes	No	Yes	
2021	Tides	No	No	Executive	
2022	Moonfall	Yes	Yes	Yes	
2022	The Magic Flute	No	No	Executive	

=== Short films ===
Year	Title	Director	Writer	Producer	Note
1978	Bei Anna	Co-director	No	No	
1979	Wilde Witwe	Yes	No	No	
1981	ASA 400	Yes	Yes	No	

=== Unrealized ===
- Roland Emmerich's unrealized projects

=== Television ===
TV movies

Year	Title	Director	Executive Producer	Writer
1980	Altosax	No	No	Yes
2012	Dark Horse	Yes	Yes	Yes

TV series

Year(s)	Title	Director	Executive Producer	Writer	Notes
1997–1998	The Visitor	No	Yes	Yes	Wrote 2 episodes
1998–2000	Godzilla: The Series	No	Yes	No	
2024	Those About to Die	Yes	Yes	No	Directed 5 episodes

== Critical reception ==
Reviewers often criticize Emmerich's films for relying heavily on visual effects and suffering from clichéd dialogue, flimsy and formulaic narratives, numerous scientific and historical inaccuracies, illogical plot developments, and lack of character depth. Emmerich contends that he is not discouraged by such criticism and that he aims to provide enjoyable "popcorn" entertainment to movie-going audiences. Stating that he is "a filmmaker, not a scientist", he creates his own fiction based on actual science or history to make the messages he sends "more exciting".

In response to accusations of insensitivity for including scenes of New York City being destroyed in The Day After Tomorrow, less than three years after the September 11 attacks, Emmerich said that it was necessary to depict the event as a means to showcase the increased unity people now have when facing a disaster, because of the attacks. When accused of resorting too often to scenes of cities being subjected to epic disasters, Emmerich says that it is a justified way of increasing awareness about both global warming, and the lack of a government preparation plan for a global doomsday scenario in the cases of The Day After Tomorrow and 2012, respectively.

Acknowledging what he characterized as flaws with Godzilla, Emmerich admitted he regretted having agreed to direct it. He stated that his lack of interest in the previous Godzilla movies, the short time he promised it would take for him to complete the film, and the studio's refusal to screen it for test audiences were all factors that may have negatively affected the quality of the final product, and cited the former reason as to why he turned down an offer to direct Spider-Man, as he was not interested in comic books or superhero-related fiction. However, Emmerich still defends Godzilla, noting that the film was highly profitable and claiming that, of all his movies, people tell him Godzilla is the one they and their kids watch the most repeatedly.

Emmerich has also faced criticism from the LGBT community. His film Stonewall was criticized for being whitewashed and diminishing the contributions of transgender women of color to starting the Stonewall riots, and for being sex-negative. In response to these claims, Emmerich told The Guardian in a 2016 interview that the Stonewall riots were "a white event, let's be honest". The film received generally negative reviews from critics. Similarly, Emmerich touted his 2016 film Independence Day: Resurgence as having a gay couple, but when the film was released, Johnny Gayzmonic of Unicorn Booty criticized the film because the couple in question was two trivial characters lacking in believable chemistry who were utilized solely for comic relief, one of whom was needlessly killed off in a way that was not vital to the plot (the other having been depicted as strictly heterosexual in tie-in material to the first film), the characters only being revealed to have been a gay couple during the aforementioned death scene (with references to their relationship being cut from the Chinese version of the film), a fate that Gayzmonic observed befell many gay couples in film.

Year	Film	Rotten Tomatoes	Metacritic
Year	Film	Overall	
1992	Universal Soldier	33%	35/100
1994	Stargate	53%	42/100
1996	Independence Day	67%	59/100
1998	Godzilla	15%	32/100
2000	The Patriot	62%	63/100
2004	The Day After Tomorrow	45%	47/100
2008	10,000 BC	9%	34/100
2009	2012	40%	49/100
2011	Anonymous	45%	50/100
2013	White House Down	52%	52/100
2015	Stonewall	9%	30/100
2016	Independence Day: Resurgence	29%	32/100
2019	Midway	41%	47/100
2022	Moonfall	35%	36/100

== Awards and nominations ==
Year (Note: Year in which awards ceremony was held)	Nominated work	Category	Result
Golden Raspberry Awards
1997	Independence Day	Worst Written Film Grossing Over $100 Million	Nominated
1999	Godzilla	Worst Prequel, Remake, Rip-off or Sequel	Won
1999	Godzilla	Worst Director	Nominated
1999	Godzilla	Worst Picture	Nominated
1999	Godzilla	Worst Screenplay	Nominated
2017	Independence Day: Resurgence	Worst Prequel, Remake, Rip-off or Sequel	Nominated
2017	Independence Day: Resurgence	Worst Director	Nominated
2017	Independence Day: Resurgence	Worst Picture	Nominated
2017	Independence Day: Resurgence	Worst Screenplay	Nominated
Hugo Awards
1997	Independence Day	Best Dramatic Presentation	Nominated
Kids' Choice Award
1997	Independence Day	Favorite Movie	Won
Jupiter Award
1997	Independence Day	Best International Director	Won
1997	Independence Day	Best International Film	Won
2005	The Day After Tomorrow	Best International Film	Won
MTV Movie Awards
1997	Independence Day	Best Movie	Nominated
People's Choice Awards
1997	Independence Day	Favorite Dramatic Motion Picture	Won
Saturn Awards
1997	Independence Day	Best Director	Won
1999	Godzilla	Best Director	Nominated
1999	Godzilla	Best Fantasy Film	Nominated
2005	The Day After Tomorrow	Best Science Fiction Film	Nominated
2010	2012	Best Action or Adventure Film	Nominated
2017	Independence Day: Resurgence	Best Science Fiction Film	Nominated
Scream Awards
2010	2012	Best Director	Nominated
Universe Reader's Choice Award
1996	Independence Day	Best Director	Won
