= Camelot Unchained =

- Developer: City State Entertainment
- Publisher: City State Entertainment
- Designer: Mark Jacobs
- Engine: Unchained Engine
- Platform: Windows
- Genre: Massively multiplayer online role-playing
- Mode: Multiplayer

Camelot Unchained is an upcoming fantasy massively multiplayer online role-playing game from City State Entertainment which was partially funded through Kickstarter. Leading its production is Mark Jacobs, the former designer of Dark Age of Camelot. Its crowd funding campaign raised US$4.5 million with Jacobs contributing an additional $5 million from his own assets, and raising an additional $7.5 million from investors, for a total of $17 million. The game is based on its own proprietary game engine engineered for server-side physics and large-scale battles, and as such will focus primarily on open world PVP rather than "theme park" instanced encounters or battlegrounds. Camelot Unchained entered Beta 1 phase on July 31, 2018, and early access on June 2, 2026.

== Gameplay ==
Camelot Unchained is considered to be a spiritual successor to Mark Jacobs' prior game Dark Age of Camelot (DAoC) and will prominently feature a Player versus Player (PvP)-centric design which Jacobs now calls "Tri-Realm". Also like DAoC, the game will borrow from Arthurian legend, Norse mythology, and Irish mythology while adding new and original elements to it. The game is planned to have large scale PvP battles as a primary focus to its gameplay. Jacobs denies considering the game a spiritual successor to DAoC although stating he could have legally done so had he chosen to.

== Plot ==
The Agne takes place after an apocalyptic event known as First Breaking of the World. Eons ago, the Veil was pierced. The Veil was the only border between our world and a stranger, more magical world Beyond. Through that tear in reality came the Dragons. Some hold that the Veil itself is alive; a mysterious entity that did not like being pierced. Its violent reactions caused the Veilstorms. These storms tore across the earth and changed everything. Abominations and new races were forged from the fires of magic and winds of the Veilstorms, creating something new out of humanity. Sometimes, the changes made them stronger; usually, the unchecked magic made humans into monsters.

Then came the Emissaries, a mysterious creatures from beyond the Veil who came to this world during the Piercing. The Emissaries gifted the diverse races with immortality in order to repopulate the world. They forged three swords of power and who ever can pull the sword from anvil will become a king. Three brothers appeared, and took the three swords. With the power of these artifacts, they became what they were most like inside: Arthur, Sigurd, and Nuada. Each forged a Realm out of the tiny area of habitable land left in the world. In the center, they founded Camelot, the glorious place of peace known as the One True City, but Camelot later fell. The land broke apart as the stabilizers failed, and the three Realms were torn asunder by explosive magic. Three islands of civilization that remained were lost in the vastness of the Stormlands.

== Development ==
In December 2012, Mark Jacobs with City State Entertainment released the first teaser for the game which hinted at the premise a three faction PvP game. It was later confirmed in a subsequent interview that Jacobs was planning a Realm versus Realm (RvR) game similar to his prior game DAoC and that instead of building another "themepark-style MMO", he would focus on a more niche PvP game. City State Entertainment started a Kickstarter funding project for Camelot Unchained on April 2, 2013. By the Kickstarter's conclusion on May 2, it had 14,873 backers with US$2,232,933 raised.

After the conclusion of their Kickstarter, CSE continued to receive backer funds to unlock various stretch goals. On March 3, 2015, Camelot Unchained entered into Alpha 1. The first Beta testing stage was originally scheduled for around July 18 of the same year, but was delayed for what would become three years. In early 2016 during the "Crunch" buildup for Beta 1, serious flaws in the ability system were discovered. Subsequently, CSE decided that the entire ability system would need to be rebuilt from the ground up and the "re-abilitation" process would take place before Beta 1 would launch. This process took longer than expected and it was not until February 2018 that the start date for Beta 1 was announced.

Camelot Unchained Beta 1 launched on July 31, 2018.

On June 2, 2026, over thirteen years after the conclusion of their successful Kickstarter campaign, CSE announced that Camelot Unchained had entered early access.

=== C.U.B.E. ===
Camelot Unchained is being developed side by side with a building system called CUBE (Camelot Unchained Building Environment) which functions similarly to other block placing building games. The program runs with the same graphics and UI systems as the main game making Addons or mods fairly easy to write and possibly crossover. CUBE is intended to have a fully functioning physics system, but it is a player option. Currently CUBE is available to all backers of Camelot Unchained, and is open 24/7 even while the base game is still in early testing phases.

=== Funding for development ===
The initial funding for the development of the game came from Kickstarter, with $2,232,933 being generated at the finish of Kickstarter campaign. Using an additional opportunity for people to keep funding the project directly through official website, the total crowdfunded amount was $4.5 million, in an addition of Mark Jacobs himself adding $5 million more. In 2018, City State Entertainment secured additional $7.5 million investment from a company called GF Capital Management & Advisors, LLC. In April 2020 City State Entertainment received a federal government loan as a part of Paycheck Protection Program, with "loan amount" listed as $639,841, and later the status of this loan was updated to "forgiven" with "amount forgiven" listed as $645,311. In February 2021 City State Entertainment received a second federal government loan as a part of Paycheck Protection Program, with "loan amount" listed as $716,927. In October 2022, City State Entertainment has notified the SEC about offering additional (on top of initial offering back in 2018) shares of the company for sale in exchange for $10,000,000.

=== Ragnarok: Colossus controversy ===
During a live stream held in January 2020 Mark Jacobs revealed that City State Entertainment was silently developing another game, codenamed Ragnarok: Colossus. It was based on same engine as Camelot Unchained and, according to developers, the work for Ragnarok: Colossus also benefited the development of Camelot Unchained. Backers reportedly expressed disappointment, as Camelot Unchained had no estimated date for release nor the next beta stage. Some backers requested refunds, which in some cases are still being delayed for over three years without developer communication, leading to speculation that the studio finances were in disarray.
