= ID4 Online =

2000 video game

- Developer: Mythic Entertainment
- Publisher: Centropolis Interactive
- Producer: Matt Firor
- Platform: Windows
- Release: 2000

ID4 Online, known more formally as Independence Day Online, was an action game developed by Mythic Entertainment, and published by Centropolis Interactive. It is based on the 1996 film Independence Day.

== Gameplay ==
Independence Day Online is a first-person, multiplayer action game in which players can choose to fight as either the humans or the returning alien invaders, engaging in large-scale battles across key locations in the solar system—including Earth, the Moon, and Mars. The game supports up to 30 players per match, with multiple matches running at once. Combat happens in space, allowing ships to thrust in any direction and rotate freely.

== Development ==
The game uses the NetImmerse 3D game engine and was the first online game that was distributed on a DVD. More than a million copies were distributed. The Independence Day Special Edition contained a one month free subscription to the game.
