= Jeff Hickman =

American video game designer

- Occupation: Video Game Designer

Jeff Hickman is a video game designer, producer and customer support specialist.

== Career ==
Hickman starting working for Mythic Entertainment in 2001 as director of customer support for the MMORPG Dark Age of Camelot. In 2005, he was promoted to executive producer for DAOC and in 2008, he became the executive producer of Warhammer Online: Age of Reckoning.

During a trip to EA Mythic by members of Blue Öyster Cult, the visiting members co-wrote and recorded a song with members of the Warhammer team, including Jeff Hickman.

In January 2011 Hickman was named executive producer of live services for Bioware. His main task is to oversee the live services and operations of Star Wars: The Old Republic.
