= Mark Jacobs (game designer) =

American game designer, programmer, author and businessman

- Education: Syracuse University; Bachelor of Arts degree of magna cum laude
- Occupations: Video game designer, programmer, author, businessman

Mark Jacobs is an American game designer, programmer, author and businessman, and the former GM/VP/CEO of Mythic Entertainment, Inc and after Mythic Entertainment was sold to Electronic Arts in 2006 he served as its GM/VP/CEO at EA. Best known as a lead designer of Dark Age of Camelot (2001) and Camelot Unchained (unreleased), he also created two early MUDs, Aradath and Dragon's Gate, serving as both the designer and programmer in addition to his duties as president and CEO. He founded A.U.S.I. (Adventures Unlimited Software Inc.) in 1983 and worked on a number of computer games for systems such as the Apple II. Jacobs left EA in 2009 after the company decided to merge BioWare with Mythic Entertainment.

== Biography ==
Jacobs attended Syracuse University and graduated with a Bachelor of Arts degree. He then attended Georgetown University Law Center and graduated with a Juris Doctor. While at GULC, he started his first computer game company, Adventures Unlimited Software Inc. in 1983. In the 1980s and until 1995, he created online games for both local networks and nationwide networks such as GEnie, AOL and Kesmai's Gamestorm network.

In 1995, he was the co-founder (along with Rob Denton), president and CEO of Mythic Entertainment, Inc. He was involved in all Mythic Entertainment games since 1995, including their most successful product, the MMORPG Dark Age Of Camelot.

In March 2011, he was the co-founder of City State Entertainment, along with Andrew Meggs, president of City State Entertainment. In 2021, the studio released its first game, a co-op PVE called Final Stand: Ragnarok, via Early Access on Steam. In March 2024, the company changed its name to Unchained Entertainment to match its proprietary game engine in preparation for the full release of Final Stand: Ragnarok later that year.

== Games ==
- Dragon's Gate (lead designer, programmer, CEO, A.U.S.I., 1990)
- Magestorm (lead designer, CEO Mythic Entertainment, 1996)
- Aliens Online (designer, CEO Mythic Entertainment, 1997)
- Darkness Falls (lead designer, CEO Mythic Entertainment, 1997)
- Darkness Falls: The Crusade (lead designer, head acrobat, CEO Mythic Entertainment, 1999)
- Imperator Online (lead designer, CEO Mythic Entertainment, 2001)
- Dark Age of Camelot (lead designer, CEO Mythic Entertainment, 2001)
- Warhammer Online: Age of Reckoning (lead designer, CEO Mythic Entertainment, 2008)
- Camelot Unchained (lead designer, CEO City State Entertainment)
