= Spellbinder: The Nexus Conflict =

1999 video game

- Developer(s): Mythic Entertainment
- Publisher(s): Centropolis Interactive; Mothership Games
- Producer(s): Matt Firor
- Platform(s): Windows
- Release: 1999
- Genre(s): First-person shooter

Spellbinder: The Nexus Conflict is a 1999 3D action game developed by Mythic Entertainment, based on the Rolemaster role-playing game from Iron Crown Enterprises.

== Development ==
In February 1999, Mythic Entertainment licensed the NetImmerse 2.2 game engine from Numerical Design Limited to develop the game. A demo for the game was released on December 4, 1999.

== Reception ==
Reception

Review scores
Publication	Score
Computer Games Magazine	3.5/5
Daily Radar	3/4
GameSpot	7.5/10

GameSpot gave the game a score of 7.5 out of 10' stating: "If you prefer team-based shooters and want to see an actual return for your skill and effort that lasts longer than the frag-count screen, you should give Spellbinder a try"
