= Centropolis Entertainment =

German film production company

- Type: Subsidiary
- Industry: Motion Pictures
- Founded: July 26, 1985; 41 years ago
- Founders: Dean Devlin; Roland Emmerich
- Headquarters: Culver City, California, United States
- Number of locations: Los Angeles, CA, United States; Berlin, Germany
- Area served: Worldwide
- Key people: Ute Emmerich; Marco Shepherd; Roland Emmerich
- Products: Films
- Parent: Das Werk AG
- Divisions: Centropolis Television; Centropolis Interactive
- Website: centropolis.com

Centropolis Entertainment is a German-American film production company founded in 1985 as Centropolis Film Productions by American film producer Dean Devlin and German film director Roland Emmerich. As of 2001, the company is a subsidiary of Das Werk AG.

== History ==
In 1996, Emmerich launched his special effects studio Centropolis Effects to provide VFX effects for its motion pictures. It was shut down in 2001.

In 1997, the studio launched its television division Centropolis Television. Its first production was The Visitor, a show that was aired on Fox.

In 1998, Centropolis entered a production deal with Sony Pictures Entertainment to produce motion pictures for its studio.

In the late 1990s, Centropolis' video game division, Centropolis Interactive, published online multiplayer games like Godzilla Online, ID4 Online, Darkness Falls: The Crusade, and Spellbinder: The Nexus Conflict.

Dean Devlin, however ultimately left in 2001 in order to form Electric Entertainment. Electric inherited and finished development on the films he developed, including Eight Legged Freaks.

== Filmography ==
=== Films ===
Year	Title	Director	Studio	Distributor	Name
1985	Making Contact	Roland Emmerich	Pro-ject Filmproduktion; Bisokop Film; Zweites Deutsches Fernsehen	New World Pictures	as Centropolis Film Productions
1987	Ghost Chase	Roland Emmerich	Pro-ject Filmproduktion; Hessicher Rundfunk; Spectrum Entertainment	Filmverlag der Autoren	as Centropolis Film Productions
1990	Moon 44	Roland Emmerich	Spectrum Entertainment	Warner Bros. CineVox	as Centropolis Film Productions
1992	Universal Soldier	Roland Emmerich	Carolco Pictures; The IndieProd Company	TriStar Pictures	as Centropolis Film Productions
1994	The High Crusade	Klaus Knoesel	Carolco Pictures	Overseas Filmgroup	as Centropolis Film Productions
1994	Stargate	Roland Emmerich	Carolco Pictures; Le Studio Canal+	Metro-Goldwyn-Mayer	as Centropolis Film Productions
1996	Independence Day	Roland Emmerich	20th Century Fox		as Centropolis Entertainment
1998	Godzilla	Roland Emmerich	TriStar Pictures; Fried Films; Independent Pictures	Sony Pictures Releasing	as Centropolis Entertainment
1999	The Thirteenth Floor	Josef Rusnak	Columbia Pictures	Sony Pictures Releasing	as Centropolis Entertainment
2000	The Patriot	Roland Emmerich	Columbia Pictures; Mutual Film Company	Sony Pictures Releasing	as Centropolis Entertainment
2002	Eight Legged Freaks	Ellory Elkayem	Village Roadshow Pictures; Electric Entertainment	Warner Bros. Pictures	as Centropolis Entertainment
2004	The Day After Tomorrow	Roland Emmerich	The Mark Gordon Company; Lionsgate Films	20th Century Fox	as Centropolis Entertainment
2007	Trade	Marco Kreuzpaintner	Lionsgate	Roadside Attractions	as Centropolis Entertainment
2008	10,000 BC	Roland Emmerich	Legendary Pictures	Warner Bros. Pictures	as Centropolis Entertainment
2009	2012	Roland Emmerich	Columbia Pictures	Sony Pictures Releasing	as Centropolis
2011	Anonymous	Roland Emmerich	Columbia Pictures; Relativity Media; Studio Babelsberg	Sony Pictures Releasing	as Centropolis Entertainment
2013	White House Down	Roland Emmerich	Columbia Pictures; Mythology Entertainment	Sony Pictures Releasing	as Centropolis Entertainment
2015	Stonewall	Roland Emmerich	Goldcrest Films	Roadside Attractions	as Centropolis
2016	Independence Day: Resurgence	Roland Emmerich	Electric Entertainment	20th Century Fox	as Centropolis Entertainment
2019	Midway	Roland Emmerich	Summit Entertainment; Ruyi Media; Starlight Culture Entertainment; AGC Studios; Street Entertainment; Entertainment One; Bona Film Group	Lionsgate	as Centropolis Entertainment
2022	Moonfall	Roland Emmerich	Summit Entertainment; AGC Studios; Street Entertainment; Huayi Brothers Media; Tencent Pictures; UK Moonfall LLP	Lionsgate (North America); AGC International (International)	as Centropolis Entertainment
2022	The Magic Flute	Florian Sigl	Flute Film; Tobis Film	Tobis Film	as Centropolis Entertainment

=== TV series ===
Year	Title	Creator	Studio	Networks	Notes
1997–1998	The Visitor	Roland Emmerich; Dean Devlin	20th Century Fox Television	Fox	as Centropolis Television
1998–2000	Godzilla: The Series	based on Godzilla by: Toho Co., Ltd. developed by: Jeff Kline; Richard Raynis	Adelaide Productions; Columbia TriStar Television	Fox Kids	as Centropolis Television
2024	Those About to Die	based on Those About to Die by: Daniel P. Mannix developed by: Robert Rodat	AGC Studios; Hollywood Gang Productions; Street Entertainment	Peacock	

=== Centropolis Effects (CFX) ===
- The Visitor (1997-1998)
- The Faculty (1998)
- Godzilla (1998)
- End of Days (1999)
- Stuart Little (1999)
- The Thirteenth Floor (1999)
- The Secret Life of Girls (1999)
- The Patriot (2000)
- What Women Want (2000)
- How the Grinch Stole Christmas (2000)
- K-PAX (2001)
- Monkeybone (2001)
- 61* (2001)
- Rose Red (2002)
- The Scorpion King (2002)
- Eight Legged Freaks (2002)
- Maid in Manhattan (2002)
- Kung Pow! Enter the Fist (2002) (special thank)
- Willard (2003)
