= Aliens Online =

1998 video game

- Developers: Mythic Entertainment; Kesmai
- Publisher: Fox Interactive
- Director: Paul Provenzano
- Producers: Matt Firor; Jason Bell; Nick Laiacona
- Designer: Mark Jacobs
- Programmer: Rob Denton
- Artists: Bob Frizzell; Missy Castro
- Platform: Microsoft Windows
- Release: NA: April 16, 1998
- Genre: First-person shooter
- Modes: Single player, multiplayer

Aliens Online is a discontinued 1998 massively multiplayer first-person shooter video game released for Microsoft Windows. It was based on the science fiction horror film Aliens.

== Gameplay ==
Aliens Online included asymmetric teams, teams consisting of more players than found in most first-person shooters of its era, job/class specialization, and RPG elements. Players could fight on either the side of the United States Colonial Marines or on the side of the Aliens. Scenarios were played in one of six different maps, with three more added over the game's lifespan.

- The Colonial Marine faction had the Medic, Scout, Soldier, and Heavy Weapons classes. More advanced weaponry were available when grouping as a "fireteam," and increased hit points became available as a character progressed in rank. Marines' equipment included the motion detector from the film Aliens, which was their sole method to locate Aliens, but would not locate Aliens which were not moving. In later versions of the game, the Marines could also drop proximity mines.
- The Hive Alien faction had the Face Hugger, Drone, Queen, and Empress classes. Their capabilities included leaping easily to vents and speeding through cramped ducts, and radar of the entire map, representing the aliens' greater awareness and hive-like mentality. They attacked only at close range using tail strikes and with claws. Each map allowed one alien player to fill the role as Queen or Empress, and that player could freely swap from drone to drone. Players gained points for killing Marines and lost them by dying, except when playing as a face hugger, which loses no points for dying.

== Development ==
The game was announced in June 1997. The budget for the game was $450,000 USD.

== Release ==
The software was free to download and was automatically updated. Joining GameStorm for $9.95 per month was required to play the game. Online play was shut down in 2000 after the GameStorm network was sold to Electronic Arts.

== Reception ==
Reception

Review scores
Publication	Score
Computer Games Strategy Plus	3.5/5
GameSpot	7.2/10
Next Generation	3/5

Aliens Online was well received upon its release. Chris Gregson of GameSpot said, "With so much to gain and absolutely nothing to lose, any self-respecting Aliens fan should give Aliens Online a try." Brooks Peck and Craig E. Engler from Science Fiction Weekly gave the beta version the perfect A score. Noting the game's bugs, they nevertheless opined, "It's clear that Kesmai has what it takes to satisfy both the Aliens fan and the hardcore gamer. This is one of those titles that cashes in on some of the Internet's promises of multiplayer action, and it's sure to be a hit with SF lovers." However, Next Generation called it "a wonderful addition to GameStorm. We just wish there was more variety so the thrill could last."

According to a retrospective by Stephen Kleckner of GamesBeat, "Aliens Online, unfortunately, was riddled with balancing issues and bad level design. (...) Ancient ’90s computing technology and Internet infrastructure and these issues worse, resulting in incredibly laggy connectivity."

During the inaugural Interactive Achievement Awards, Aliens Online received a nomination for "Online Game of the Year" by the Academy of Interactive Arts & Sciences; the award ultimately went to Ultima Online.
