= Terris Nguyen Temple =

American artist and Tibetan Buddhist

- Born: May 5, 1944; Bakersfield, California, U.S.
- Died: July 8, 2024 (aged 80)
- Occupation: Artist
- Movement: Tibetan Buddhism

Terris Nguyen Temple (May 5, 1944 – July 8, 2024) was an American artist and Tibetan Buddhist. Temple studied the art of Tibetan thangka painting in Nepal during the years 1966 to 1975. In the twenty-first century, Nguyen Temple and his wife were the official artists to Ogyen Trinley Dorje, the 17th Gyalwa Karmapa, and the Tsurphu Monastery.

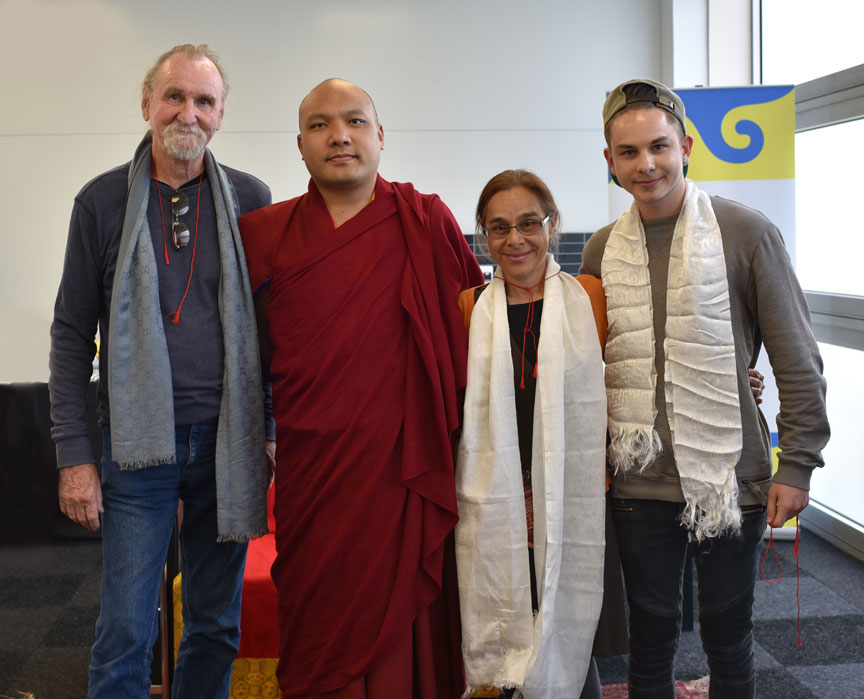
Terris, Ogyen Trinley Dorje, Leslie, and son Sonam Dorje in 2017

== History ==
Terris' first teacher was the State Artist of Tibet, the late Master Jampa Tsedan, the Dalai Lama's artist. Later Terris studied with the late Taklung Tsetrul Rinpoche - Simla, India; the late Sherpa artist Pargyaltsen (Kapa Ngawong Damcho) - Nepal; the late Dolpo artist Pema Wangyal, and the late Newar artist Siddhimuni Shakya - Kathmandu. In 1969 Terris became one Rangjung Rigpe Dorje, 16th Karmapa's original Western disciples. In 1974 at the invitation of Chogyam Trungpa Rinpoche, Terris taught thangka painting at the then Naropa Institute in Boulder Colorado, now Naropa University. This was the opening year of the Institute.

== Tsurphu Appliques ==
1992–1997 Terris and fellow artist Leslie Nguyen created two giant silk appliques for Tsurphu Monastery in Tibet.

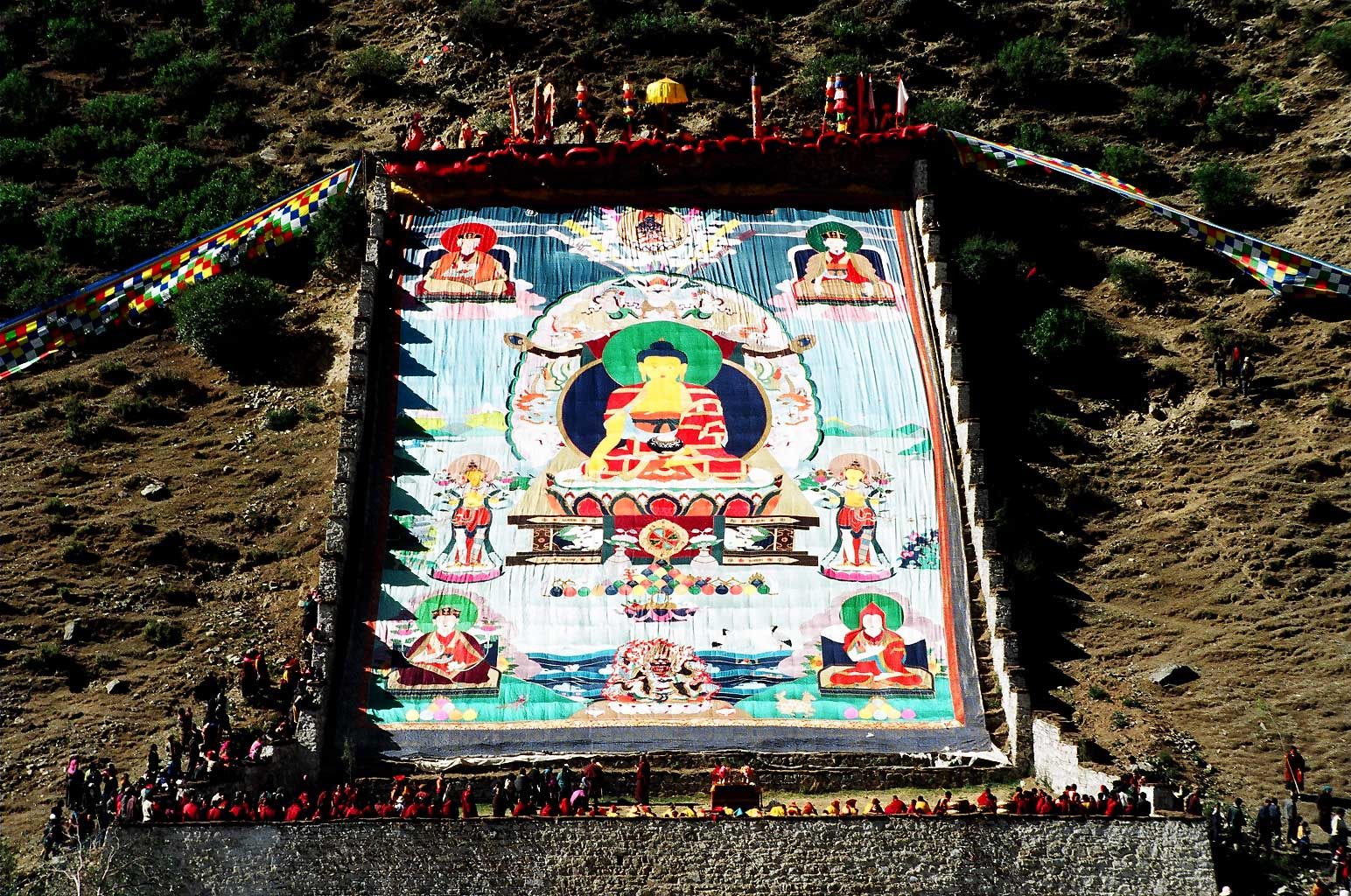
Karma Gadri Goku applique

Tsurphu Monastery is the Karmapa's main seat in Tibet and was established in 1187 by the 1st Karmapa, Dusum Khyenpa. The Karma Gadri Applique (gos-sku chen-mo, 108 ft x 76 ft, 35m x 23m). The Mahakala Goku (applique, gos-sku chen-mo, 30 ft x 30 ft, 10m x 10 m).

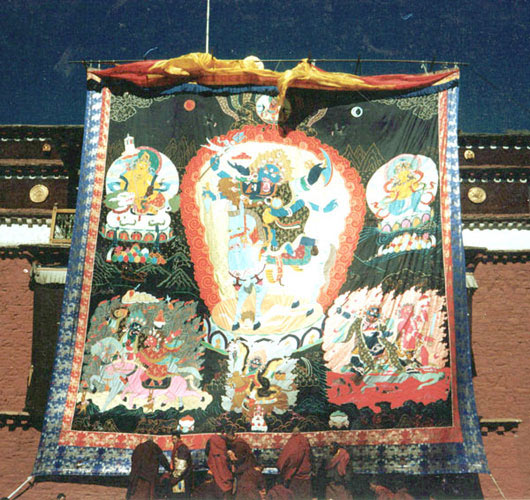
The Mahakala Applique

The originals had been destroyed during the Cultural Revolution in the mid 1960s, and no photographic records existed. The Abbot of Tsurphu, Drupon Dechen Rinpoche gave the artists oral instructions.

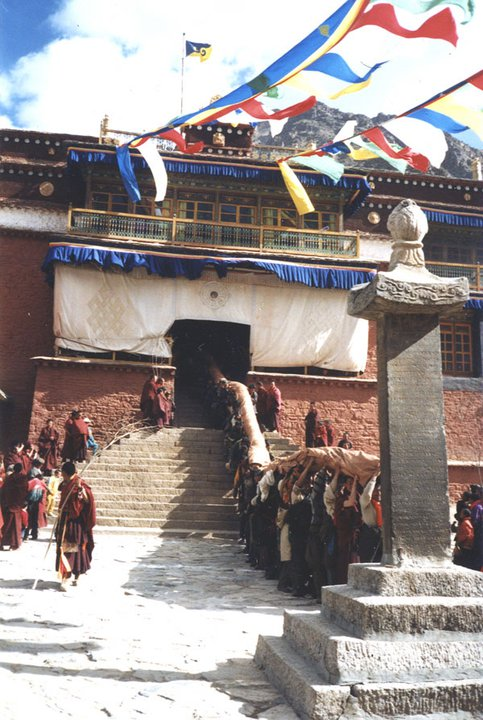
Carrying the Karma Gadri thangka

Two ceremonial banners, as companion pieces for the two giant appliques were requested by Tsurphu in 1997. These works are shown annually during major cultural festivals at Tsurphu, attended by devotees from all over Tibet, a tradition that began at the monastery in 1590. During Saga Dawa, the festival honoring the Buddha's birth, enlightenment and Parnirvana, the Karma Gadri Goku is shown. It takes a minimum of sixty strong people to carry the Karma Gadri thangka out of the Temple for display on the Mountain.

The Tsechur Drabje (40m x 2m, 120 ft x 7 ft) which is the ceremonial companion piece, is being made now in India by the 17th Karmapa. Upon completion the two artists will take it to Tsurphu. The Mahakala Goku (completed in 1997), and its companion the Gutor (Norbu) Drabje appliqué (completed in 2007). They are both 120 ft × 8 ft (37 m × 2.4 m) and are used during the Gutor Festival to purify the Tibetan Lunar New Year. The Tsechur Drobje drawings were presented in 2016 to the 17th Karmapa Ogyen Trinley Dorje. The sewing work is expected to be completed in 2019 and will also be given to Tsurphu Monastery.

== The Gyalwa Karmapa ==
Ogyen Trinley Dorje is the supreme head of the 900 year old Karma Kagyu order of Tibetan Buddhism. Terris and Leslie are involved with the Karmapa's Koryug Organization, doing environment projects in the Himalayas.

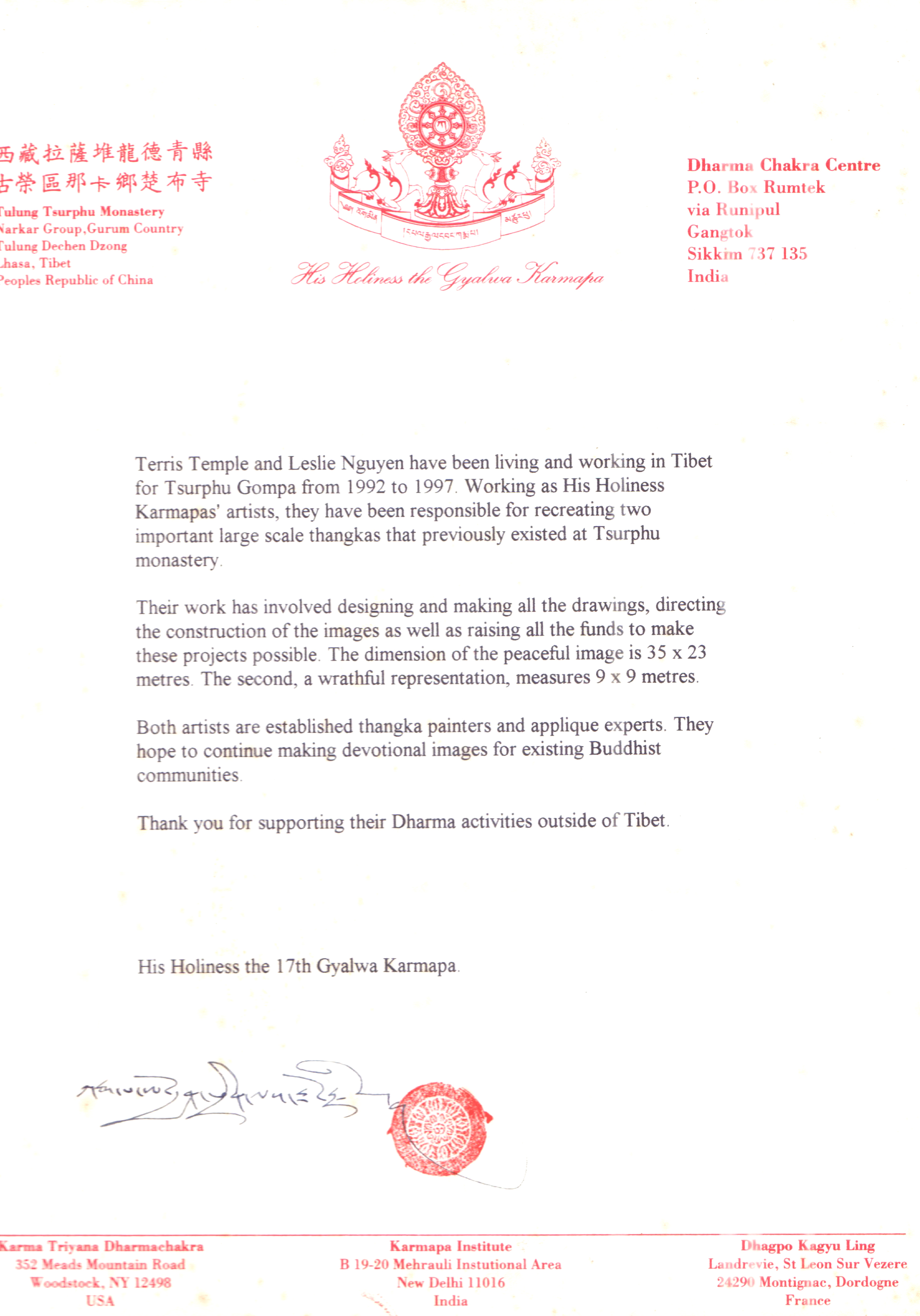
Official letter from the 17th Gyalwa Karmapa introducing Terris Temple and Leslie Nguyen.

Terris is also the Executive Director of Liberation Arts, a registered USA non profit organization, relating to art, culture and the environment. Liberation Arts was created with advice from the 17th Karmapa in 2010.

== Current projects ==
Presently Terris is executive producer in a feature documentary "Thongdrol" on the subject of Tibetan art especially the lineage style Karma Gadri with the Karmapa. He is also completing a documentary "Tsurphu, the Giant Appliques", using the archival footage of the giant appliqués created for Tsurphu, 1992–2017.

In Maui Hawaii 1976, the 16th Karmapa advised Terris to do flower and bird painting in addition to thangkas, which Terris only produces by commission. These bird and flower paintings are created using mineral and botanical pigments with the techniques of traditional Tibetan painting. A few are graced with the 17th Karmapa's calligraphy at the ages of 8 and 14 years old.

The natural palette consists of cinnabar, orpiment, realgar, malachite, azurite, red lead, mineral whites and the earth minerals delicately lined and shaded with lac, cochineal, indigo, safflower and a Himalayan leaf known as 'shung kan'.

These colors are natural pigments used before aniline dyes took the market in the 1860s and Terris has used them since the 1960s. The silks used are from China, Japan, Thailand and Vietnam. Many of these paintings are of extinct and endangered species due to Terris’ passion in the preservation of the environment for future generations.

Terris and Leslie continue making contributions to Tibetan Art.
