= Mythic Entertainment =

Defunct video game developer

- Formerly: Interworld Productions (1995–1997); EA Mythic, Inc. (2006–2008); BioWare Mythic (2009–2012)
- Type: Subsidiary
- Industry: Video games
- Predecessor: Adventures Unlimited Software Inc. Interesting Systems Inc.
- Founded: 1995; 31 years ago
- Defunct: 2014; 12 years ago
- Fate: Dissolved
- Headquarters: Fairfax, Virginia, United States
- Key people: Ray Muzyka, Group General Manager; Greg Zeschuk, Chief Creative Officer; Rob Denton, Group General Manager; Eugene Evans, General Manager; Jeff Hickman, Studio Executive Producer
- Products: Online games
- Parent: Electronic Arts (2006–2014)

Mythic Entertainment (formerly BioWare Mythic, EA Mythic, Inc., and Interworld Productions) was an American video game developer based in Fairfax, Virginia that was most widely recognized for developing the 2001 massively multiplayer online role-playing game Dark Age of Camelot. Mythic was a prolific creator of multiplayer online games following its establishment in the mid-1990s.

On May 29, 2014, Electronic Arts announced it would be "closing the EA Mythic location in Fairfax", effectively winding down all the studio's operations. Despite the studio's closure, Dark Age of Camelot will continue to be supported by ex-Mythic staff under a new studio, Broadsword, which is also responsible for maintaining Ultima Online. As of 2025, the name remains a registered trademark of EA.

== History ==
Mythic originally evolved from two early Washington, DC (USA) area online game development companies. The first was Adventures Unlimited Software Inc. (AUSI), was founded in 1984 By Mark Jacobs when it launched Aradath, a commercial online role-playing video game which charged US$40 per month. AUSI later developed games for GEnie, creating an online version of Diplomacy with Eric Raymond in 1990, and Dragon's Gate in 1985, originally inspired by Aradath. Mark Jacobs was the president of AUSI and other developers there would later work for Mythic.

The other half of Mythic Entertainment was Interesting Systems, Inc., founded by Rob Denton, Matt Firor, Don Campbell, and Roger Shropshire in Fairfax, VA, in 1990. Prior to the founding of Mythic Entertainment, ISI had developed one multi-user BBS text-based role-playing game called Tempest, which was later renamed Darkness Falls. Darkness Falls would later provide the codebase for Dark Age of Camelot.

Mythic Entertainment was officially formed in 1995 when AUSI (Mark Jacobs) and ISI (Rob Denton) joined together. Its original name was Interworld Productions, and in November 1997 the name was changed to Mythic Entertainment. Mythic made numerous online games in the mid and late 1990s, ranging from online action first-person shooters to online RPGs. Some titles include Silent Death Online, Magestorm Millennium, Darkness Falls: The Crusade, ID4 Online, Spellbinder: The Nexus Conflict, and Splatterball.

In 2001, Mythic Entertainment released its first MMORPG, Dark Age of Camelot, the game for which Mythic is best known.

Electronic Arts purchased Mythic Entertainment and renamed the company EA Mythic on June 20, 2006. EA Mythic renamed themselves back to Mythic Entertainment on July 10, 2008. Mythic Entertainment released Warhammer Online: Age of Reckoning, its second MMORPG, on September 18, 2008.

On June 24, 2009, it was announced that as part of EA's restructuring plan Mythic Entertainment and BioWare would come together under a new RPG/MMO division headed by BioWare General Manager Dr. Ray Muzyka. It was also revealed that the current General Manager and long-time Mythic boss Mark Jacobs had left EA on June 23, 2009 and would be replaced by Rob Denton. The company was then renamed to BioWare Mythic. On November 9, 2009, Mythic was part of a broader reduction in force throughout Electronic Arts. The number of employees released was not made public.

In 2012, the studio was renamed back to Mythic Entertainment. This was confirmed in November 2012 on the Dark Age of Camelot website.

=== Mythic / Microsoft lawsuit ===
Mythic sued Microsoft in December 2003 for trademark infringement and unfair competition regarding the name of Microsoft's Mythica MMORPG, which was in development at that time. On May 25, 2004, three months after the game was cancelled, Mythic announced that the case was settled and that Microsoft agreed to not use the Mythica name on new online video games and to not register it as a trademark. Also, as part of the deal, Microsoft gave all Mythica-related trademarks and domain names to Mythic.

== Games ==
=== Aliens Online ===
Aliens Online was an online first-person shooter/action game based on the movie franchise where two teams of marines and aliens fought each other. The game was for the GameStorm gaming service.

=== Darkness Falls: The Crusade ===
Darkness Falls: The Crusade was a fantasy MUD-style game which has been hosted by America Online, GameStorm, and Centropolis Entertainment. The game was a sequel to Darkness Falls that was offered on the AOL and Gamestorm gaming services. The game is in large part the intellectual concept behind Dark Age of Camelot. This game is no longer available as of early 2006 along with all other games offered on the Mythic-Realms gaming center excluding Dragon's Gate.

=== ID4 Online ===
ID4 Online or (Independence Day Online as it is also called) was a game released by Mythic and published by Centropolis Interactive.

=== Dark Age of Camelot ===
Mythic started Dark Age of Camelot development in late 1999. The company invested US$3.2 million developing the game, an amount more than double the sum used for all its previous games. Dark Age of Camelot was also the company's first massively multiplayer online role-playing game (MMORPG).

Dark Age of Camelot development was led by Rob Denton, as lead programmer, and by Matt Firor as Producer. Its support and development continues, in parallel with other EA Mythic projects, such as the 2005-announced Warhammer Online.

On February 5, 2014, Mythic co-founder Rob Denton started a new studio called Broadsword Games. On the same day, development of the game was transferred from Mythic to the new studio. As such, Dark Age of Camelot will continue to be supported after the closure of Mythic Entertainment.

=== Imperator Online ===
In 2002, Mythic announced it was working on a new title, a science-fiction themed MMO called Imperator Online. This MMORPG based on an alternate history where the Roman Republic never fell, and advanced to be a space-traveling multi-planet Empire. Minor changes at important moments in Roman history create an extremely different timeline for Earth, leading to an interstellar Roman Republica and thousands of years of galactic Pax Romana. However, the game's production was canceled in July 2005, when Mark Jacobs announced that it had acquired the Warhammer Online license from Games Workshop.

=== Warhammer Online: Age of Reckoning ===
During the E3 trade show, on May 18, 2005, Mythic announced that it had licensed the Warhammer Fantasy IP and was starting to work on a new MMO, Warhammer Online: Age of Reckoning. This title was released on September 18, 2008. The game's last day of play was December 18, 2013.

=== List of games ===
Year	Title	Platform(s)	Notes
As Interworld Productions
1996	Dragon's Gate	Windows	
1996	Rolemaster: Magestorm	Windows	
As Mythic Entertainment
1998	Aliens Online	Windows	
1998	Godzilla Online	Windows	
1998	Starship Troopers: Battlespace	Windows	
1999	Darkness Falls: The Crusade	Windows	
1999	Spellbinder: The Nexus Conflict	Windows	
2000	ID4 Online	Windows	
2001	Dark Age of Camelot	Windows	
2003	Dark Age of Camelot: Trials of Atlantis	Windows	
2004	Dark Age of Camelot: Catacombs	Windows	
2005	Dark Age of Camelot: Darkness Rising	Windows	
2008	Warhammer Online: Age of Reckoning	Windows	
2009	Ultima Online: Stygian Abyss	Windows	
As BioWare Mythic
2011	Dragon Age II	Windows	Assisted BioWare Edmonton
2011	Dragon Age II	PlayStation 3	Assisted BioWare Edmonton
2011	Dragon Age II	Xbox 360	Assisted BioWare Edmonton
As Mythic Entertainment
2013	Ultima Forever: Quest for the Avatar	iOS	
2014	Dungeon Keeper	Android	
2014	Dungeon Keeper	iOS	
