= Dark Age of Camelot =

2001 massively multiplayer online role-playing video game

- Original cover art
- Developers: Mythic Entertainment; Broadsword Online Games
- Publishers: Vivendi Universal Games (US); Wanadoo Edition (Europe); Capcom (Japan); Electronic Arts (2006–present)
- Designers: Mark Jacobs; Matt Firor; Rob Denton
- Engine: NetImmerse
- Platform: Microsoft Windows
- Release: October 9, 2001
- Genre: Massively multiplayer online role-playing game
- Mode: Multiplayer

Dark Age of Camelot is a massively multiplayer online role-playing game released in October 2001 in North America, and in January 2002 in Europe. The game combines Arthurian lore, Norse mythology, and Celtic mythology with high fantasy. It is set in the period after King Arthur's death, when his kingdom has split into three realms, which are in a constant state of war with each other. Dark Age of Camelot includes both player versus environment (PvE) and realm versus realm (RvR) combat.

Developed by Mythic Entertainment, the game is in large part an adaptation of a previous text-based game Darkness Falls: The Crusade (1999). The development of Dark Age of Camelot was later transferred from Mythic Entertainment to Broadsword Online Games, a newly established studio, which also subsequently took over development of Mythic's other MMO game, Ultima Online. Mythic was shut down in May 2014.

As of 2019, a new "progression" server was revealed to be in development, which is said to be limited to the content from the original release, the Shrouded Isles expansion, and the housing zone additions. With regard to "Old Frontiers" returning to the game, the development team plans to poll the community for their preference.

== Gameplay ==
The player character riding a horse through the realm of Hibernia. The early 2001-era graphic engine and HUD design can be seen in this shot.

The character is controlled by either the mouse or keyboard. The player can customize up to three "Quickbars" of 10 slots each with spells, melee or ranged attacks (depending on the equipped weapon), or macros, which can be either clicked on or selected with the number keys to activate. Dark Age of Camelot's class system is balanced at the RvR level instead of in direct comparison to the other realms' equivalent classes. Dark Age of Camelot classes are very rigid with specific roles, play styles, and specialization point allocations.

Guilds offer social, economic, and PvE/PvP advantages that contrast with or exceed those of soloing and "pick-up groups". Each guild comes with its own chat channel, in-game ranking system, territory claiming ability, guild banking system, guild housing, emblem, and reward system in the form of guild bounty points and merit points. Guild leaders can define their own set of rules and goals, and can customize the privileges (such as inviting new members, speaking in alliance chat, and claiming captured towers for the guild) of each Rank within the guild. Furthermore, alliances can be formed between player guilds, permitting them to create a shared chat channel for all guilds within the alliance to communicate.

Realm versus Realm gameplay is the main focus of Dark Age of Camelot. The storyline revolves around what happens after the death of King Arthur and the fragmentation of his former kingdom. Albion, Hibernia, and Midgard are in a three-way war against each other and constantly war for control of powerful relics, keeps, and towers, as well as control of the entrance to Darkness Falls.

=== Realms ===
Dark Age of Camelot has three realms, allowing a unique dynamic of RvRvR gameplay. Each of the three realms is inspired by historical folklore and mythology:

- Albion is the Realm of knights and damsels, based on Arthurian mythology. Notable classes include the Wizard, the Paladin, and the Infiltrator. Areas of interest in Albion include Avalon Marsh and Stonehenge, which is located in the Salisbury Plains. Camelot is Albion's capital.
- Hibernia is the land of forest and magic, based on Celtic folklore. Notable classes include the Enchanter, the Champion, and the Ranger. Areas of interest include the Valley of Bri Leith, Lough Gur, and Connacht. Tir Na Nog is Hibernia's capital.
- Midgard is the land of the trolls and giants, based on Norse mythology. Notable classes include the Runemaster, the Berserker, and the Hunter. Areas of interest include Myrkwood Forest, the Vanern Swamp, and Muspelheim. Jordheim is Midgard's capital.

== Storyline ==
Each realm has a unique but parallel storyline, which is expanded with retail expansions. In the original Realm zones, smaller cities need protection against monsters. Albion is menaced by undead raised by Morgana, Hibernia is torn apart by the Unseelie Court and Siabra, and Midgard by the treacherous Blodfelag.

- Shrouded Isles - each realm is called to assist a smaller allied realm against a large enemy. In Albion, the Drakoran have besieged the final strongholds of Lady Lile's Avalonians. Hibernia has come to the aid of Hybrasil, where the Sylvans face extinction at the hands of the Fomorians. Midgard's ancestral home at Aegir has seen the Last of the Troll Fathers hunted down by the Morvalt.
- Trials of Atlantis - the ruins of Atlantis have been discovered, as well as a portal to another Plane where the ancient Atlanteans underwent their trials. The Trials remain in a form twisted by the passage of time and the departure of the denizens of Atlantis. Ancient artifacts wait to be discovered and have their power and secrets revealed by learned scholars. Familiar figures from Greek and Egyptian mythology make their appearance in a new land waiting to be discovered.
- Catacombs - a nemesis has taken control of the power within the Darkspire, gaining control of most of the denizens of an underground realm's race. Arawn, previously referenced as an ally of the Avalonians and patron of the Inconnu, has had his realm overrun by revolting dead and enslaved Inconnu. The Shar are only able to hold their ground at the gates of their Otherworld citadel. The Kobolds have been forced to open the secrets of the undercity to outsiders in a desperate bid for survival.
- Darkness Rising - the King of the realm has returned to fight back a growing rebellion. Further investigations reveal a conspiracy with a dark power behind the rebellion. To become a Champion of the Realm the player must defeat the demonic evil behind the unrest and return peace to the land.
- Labyrinth of the Minotaur - the ancient race of Minotaur has returned to the lands of Albion, Midgard, and Hibernia to reclaim powerful but corrupt relics hidden long ago by their ancestors. Lust for these relics once brought about the downfall of the powerful Minotaur kingdom and their evil influence now threatens the kingdoms of Man.

== Development ==
Early developmental concept art for the original playable races in the game. From left to right: Saracen, Avalonian, Highlander, Briton, Elf, Lurikeen, Celtic Human, Firbolg, Norseman, Dwarf, Troll, Kobold.

The decision to develop Dark Age of Camelot was made in late 1999, with it originally being conceived of as a graphical MUD. Mythic Entertainment president Mark Jacobs proposed the idea of using Arthurian legend since it was on the public domain and thus the company would be free of any licensing issues. Total development costs excluding equipment leases was about US$2.5 million and took 18 months with a team of 25 full-time developers. 3DS Max and Character Studio were used to create all models and animations within the game.

Toward the end of development, Mythic found itself in a difficult financial situation: since it had never borrowed money, it lacked a credit rating sufficient to lease the Dell servers needed to run the game. After being denied the lease by Dell, Mythic had to purchase each server using its development funds. Securing a publisher was also a difficult task; every publisher that Mythic initially approached rejected the game except for one, Vivendi Games. In 2014, Jacobs still expressed gratitude to Vivendi for taking a chance on the studio.

During the game's prime, Mythic operated 120 dual-processor Pentium servers running Linux. Out of those, groups of six servers were devoted to running one world, or as the player saw it, one server. The servers were designed to handle 20,000 players simultaneously logged in at any given time, but Mythic limited them to about 4,000 each in order to keep the world from feeling too cluttered. Much of the game's code was also stored on the servers, with the user client more focused on graphics and texture loading based on a data stream limited to 10 kbit/s per player.

Broadsword Games later released Dark Age of Camelot: Endless Conquest, a non-subscription style game account allowing players to play the game for free, with some restrictions on how many characters the player can have, character classes, as well as some services within the game. Their timeline originally placed release in fall of 2018, but "unforeseen issues and technological constraints" with the v1.125 patch has forced them to delay the release until early 2019. The user's prior accounts are eligible for Endless Conquest as well as new accounts.

=== Expansions ===
Mythic has produced seven expansions (which originally had to be bought separately, but are now free downloads) for DAoC. The expansions were not released on European servers (run by GOA), until typically months after the Mythic release.

Note: A patch is mentioned in this list due to its impact on one of the expansions. Also, all expansions are now included free as part of the main client download.

- Shrouded Isles (SI) (November 12, 2002; February 21, 2003 in Europe) - added 6 new classes (Necromancer, Reaver; Savage, Bonedancer; Valewalker, Animist), 3 races (Inconnu, Valkyn, Sylvan) and a brand new land for each realm near the size of the old world (in addition to the old world), which also includes epic dungeons. This expansion pack is now a free download. GameSpot presented Shrouded Isles with its annual "Best Expansion Pack on PC" award.
- Foundations (Housing, June 18, 2003) - free expansion which added player housing and consignment merchants (the ability for players to set up a shop and sell in-game items, whether crafted or loot from monsters). Players are able to purchase four different sizes of houses (cottage, house, villa and mansion) and decorate them as they please. Houses also provided players with an easy way to store and transfer items between characters on the same account and realm.
- Trials of Atlantis (ToA, October 28, 2003; February 27, 2004 in Europe) - added 3 new races (Half-Ogre, Frostalf, Shar) and high level content and zones (which are the same for each realm), and new terrain graphics for all areas of the game (including trees). A notable general feature introduced with this expansion was the ability to actually dive and explore underwater as opposed to simply swimming across the surface. This expansion pack is now a free download. The expansion featured items known as artifacts, and extra abilities known as "Master Levels". Artifacts, obtained through hidden encounters, only become useful when the player finds the three scrolls hoarded by Atlantean monsters. Furthermore, artifacts must gain experience in order to reach their full potential.
- New Frontiers (NF, June 22, 2004; November 11, 2004 in Europe) - remake of the game's realm vs. realm warfare (free, required expansion). This included making the entire frontiers one zone (instead of each realm's frontier being separated), redesigning keeps and adding towers, and adding numerous types of siege apparatus.
- Catacombs (Cata, December 7, 2004; April 1, 2005 in Europe) - added 5 new classes (Heretic; Vampiir, Bainshee; Warlock, Valkyrie), instanced dungeons (where players entering certain areas get their own private dungeon to hunt in), and new zones and quests with an emphasis on faster and easier leveling. It also includes new player model graphics and new graphics for all the games' dungeons (except Darkness Falls). The players may now download and venture into the depths of the Catacombs for free. This expansion can be downloaded via the website for no extra charge.
- Darkness Rising (DR, October 11, 2005; February 2006 in Europe) - the expansion introduced Champion weapons (much like epic armor), player mounts (horses), Champion Levels and subclassing (small abilities from another class), new dungeons and instanced zones for the new Champion Quests and new graphics for the game world's models (such as barns, haystacks and forts, including the Darkness Falls dungeon and the capital cities) which are following the design ideas presented in Mythic's new graphics for the starting cities. Darkness Rising was also the first paid expansion for Dark Age of Camelot able to be downloaded. A trailer has been created by GOA to showcase this expansion. Mythic also introduced a new island, called Agramon, which acts as a central island that connected the frontiers of the three realms. Unlike the rest of the Frontiers zones, there are no keeps and any player from any realm can open the gates that border the island.
- Labyrinth of the Minotaur (LotM, November 5, 2006; February 14, 2007 in Europe) - features include a new race (the Minotaur, which comes in three types, one for each realm), a new hybrid class (The Mauler), a new RvR dungeon, Mythrians, and additional Champion Levels (6-10). The pack introduced the largest RVR dungeon in Camelot history (Labyrinth) with access by all three realms located on Agramon Island. Labyrinth introduced mythrians a new item slot, and when equipped these myths will give small bonuses to character. This allowed players to increase the stat caps of the item's respective attribute. Until this expansion, Mythic had never given each of the three realms the same class.
- New New Frontiers (NNF, September 5, 2007) - while officially a patch and not an expansion, there were significant changes to the layout of keeps and towers as well as a revamp of the Siegecraft line (including the addition of siege towers and tents) in patch 1.90. The playerbase refers to this patch as the "New, New Frontiers".

== Reception ==
Reception

Aggregate scores
Aggregator	Score
GameRankings	88% (24 reviews)
Metacritic	88/100 (18 reviews)

Review scores
Publication	Score
Computer Gaming World	4.55/5 stars
Game Informer	8.5/10
GameSpot	91/100
GameSpy	92/100
IGN	90/100
PC Magazine	5/5 stars
Gameplanet	4.55/5 stars

=== Sales ===
Before the release of Dark Age of Camelot, Mythic Entertainment forecast "30,000 players on launch in the United States", according to GameSpy. In that country, the title entered NPD Intelect's weekly computer game sales rankings in first place for October 7–13, 2001. Its initial shipment sold out within one day. Its sales reached 51,000 units within four days of release. Dark Age of Camelot remained at #1 for the week ending on October 20, but fell to third and fifth in the following two weeks, respectively. The game claimed first place on NPD's monthly chart for October 2001. After a ninth-place finish for the week ending on November 10, it was absent from NPD's weekly top 10 and monthly top 20.

By the first week of November, Dark Age of Camelot had sold 115,894 units in the United States. Remarking on this performance, GameSpot's writer Desslock explained that the game had "sold extremely well during the first few weeks of its release", and considered to be larger success than the other massively multiplayer RPG released that year, Anarchy Online. He cited its performance as evidence that "there's probably never been a larger demand for RPGs". Dark Age of Camelot's sales in the United States reached 300,000 copies, for revenues of $10.4 million, by August 2006. At the time, this led Edge to declare it the country's 63rd-best-selling computer game released since January 2000. The Dark Age of Camelot franchise, including its expansion packs, totaled sales of 780,000 units in the United States by 2006.

The game was also a hit in Europe, where it sold above 100,000 units by March 2003.

=== Reviews and awards ===
During the 5th Annual Interactive Achievement Awards, the Academy of Interactive Arts & Sciences (AIAS) honored Dark Age of Camelot with the "Massive Multiplayer/Persistent World" award; it also received nominations for the "Computer Game of the Year", "Innovation in Computer Gaming", and "Game Design" awards. At the following year's awards ceremony, AIAS nominated the expansion Shrouded Isles for "Massive Multiplayer/Persistent World Game of the Year", which was ultimately awarded to The Sims Online.

== Legacy ==
In 2012, a Kickstarter campaign to develop Camelot Unchained came about, designed by Mark Jacobs.
