= Elonka Dunin =

American video game developer and cryptologist

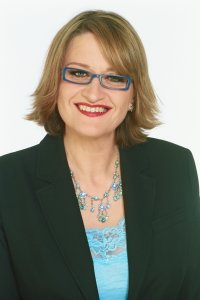
- Dunin in 2006
- Born: December 29, 1958 (age 67); Santa Monica, California, U.S.
- Occupation: Video game developer
- Website: elonka.com

Elonka Dunin (/ɪˈlɒŋkə ˈdʌnɪn/; born December 29, 1958) is an American video game developer and cryptologist. Dunin worked at Simutronics Corp. in St. Louis, Missouri from 1990–2014, and in 2015 was Senior Producer at Black Gate Games in Nashville, Tennessee. She is Chairperson Emerita and one of the founders of the International Game Developers Association's Online Games group, has contributed or been editor in chief on multiple IGDA State of the Industry white papers, and was one of the Directors of the Global Game Jam from 2011–2014. As of 2020 she works as a management consultant at Accenture.

Dunin has published a book of exercises on classical cryptography, and maintains cryptography-related websites about topics such as Kryptos, a sculpture at the Central Intelligence Agency containing an encrypted message, and another on the world's most famous unsolved codes. She has given several lectures on the subject of cryptography, and according to the PBS series NOVA scienceNOW she is "generally considered the leading Kryptos expert in the world". In 2010, bestselling author Dan Brown named a character, Nola Kaye, in his novel The Lost Symbol after her, in an anagram pattern.

== Early life and education ==
Dunin was born in Santa Monica, California, the older of two children to Stanley Dunin, a Polish-American mathematician, and Elsie Ivancich, a Croatian-American dance ethnologist at UCLA.

Dunin graduated in 1976 from University High School, and then enrolled as an undergraduate at UCLA, but dropped out near the end of her freshman year.

Dunin joined the United States Air Force, working as an avionics technician at RAF Mildenhall in the United Kingdom and Beale Air Force Base in California. After choosing not to re-enlist, she studied digital electronics at Yuba College—a two-year community college—but did not obtain a degree.

== Career ==
=== Online games ===
In the 1980s, she became involved with the growing BBS culture. In 1989, while she was working as a temporary legal secretary in Los Angeles, this interest overlapped into the early multiplayer games, such as British Legends on CompuServe and Simutronics' GemStone II on GEnie.

In 1990, Dunin moved to St. Louis and began working for the online game company Simutronics. Simutronics launched its own website, play.net, in 1997 with Dunin as General Manager of Online Games, managing Simutronics' online community. Dunin was the product manager for GemStone III, executive producer for the Hercules and Xena: Warrior Princess-based multiplayer game Alliance of Heroes, and worked in a variety of production and development roles on most of Simutronics' other products, including CyberStrike, Modus Operandi, DragonRealms, HeroEngine, Fantasy University, and Tiny Heroes. She is a founding member of the International Game Developers Association's Online Games SIG and edited four of their annual White Papers on various aspects of the online game industry, such as "Web and Downloadable Games" and "Persistent Worlds".

==== Games ====
Dunin held a variety of production and development roles during her 24 years at Simutronics. Games that she worked on include:

- GemStone III
- GemStone IV
- DragonRealms
- CyberStrike
- CyberStrike 2
- Alliance of Heroes (originally Hercules & Xena: Alliance of Heroes)
- Modus Operandi
- Orb Wars
- Fantasy University
- Tiny Heroes

=== Cryptography ===
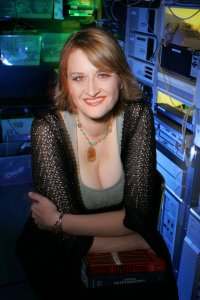
in St. Louis, 2006

Dunin has written books and articles about cryptography, and been interviewed on radio and television about related subjects such as Kryptos, the Smithy Code, and Ricky McCormick's encrypted notes. In an interview with GIGnews.com, Dunin said that in the year 2000 she cracked the PhreakNIC v3.0 Code, an amateur cryptographic puzzle created by a hacker group, and that this launched her public interest in high-profile ciphers. Because of the location of Kryptos on CIA grounds, physical access to the sculpture is restricted. According to Wired News, in 2002, Dunin gave a presentation to CIA analysts about steganography and Al-Qaeda, and "[i]n 2002, Dunin was one of the lucky few who saw [Kryptos] in person", and "she also made rubbings of the text". Based on her visit, she launched the beginnings of what became a comprehensive website about the sculpture, and also became co-moderator of a Yahoo Group that is attempting to decipher the encrypted messages on the sculpture. In 2003, Dunin organized a team which solved the ciphers on Kryptos's sister sculpture, the Cyrillic Projector.

When Kryptos sculptor Jim Sanborn chose to release information about an error on the sculpture in 2006, he contacted Dunin to make the announcement. In July 2007, Dunin appeared on the PBS program NOVA scienceNOW, as an expert on Kryptos, and in 2009, contributed two articles about the sculpture for the book Secrets of The Lost Symbol: The Unauthorized Guide to the Mysteries Behind The Da Vinci Code Sequel, a companion book to author Dan Brown's novel The Lost Symbol. Dunin had assisted Brown with the research for the novel, and Brown named a character in the novel after her. The character "Nola Kaye" is an anagrammed form of "Elonka".

In 2006, Dunin compiled a book of several hundred exercises in classical cryptography, which was published in the United States as The Mammoth Book of Secret Codes and Cryptograms, and in the UK as The Mammoth Book of Secret Code Puzzles. The book also includes a few details about several unsolved codes, such as Kryptos.

In 2013, in response to a Freedom of Information Act request by Dunin, the NSA released documents which show the NSA became involved in attempts to solve the Kryptos puzzle in 1992, following a challenge by Bill Studeman, Deputy Director of the CIA. The documents show that by June 1993, a small group of NSA cryptanalysts had succeeded in solving the first three parts of the sculpture.

== Public speaking ==
Dunin has given talks on Kryptos and the Cyrillic Projector at the National Security Agency's Cryptologic History Symposium, Def Con, Shmoocon, Notacon, PhreakNIC, and Dragon*Con, and has also given lectures at the International Game Developers Conference. She has been invited to be a co-host on the Binary Revolution webcast three times. In October 2012, she was the guest of honor at Archon.

In 2021, she gave a TEDx talk on cryptography, "2000 years of ordinary secrets".

== Personal life ==
Dunin is a Wikipedia editor who has made tens of thousands of edits.

== Works and publications ==
- (editor) IGDA Online Games White Paper, 2002. PDF
- (editor) IGDA Online Games White Paper, 2003. PDF
- (editor) IGDA Web & Downloadable Games White Paper, 2004. PDF
- (editor-in-chief) IGDA Persistent Worlds White Paper, 2004. PDF
- Dunin, Elonka (April 2006). The Mammoth Book of Secret Codes and Cryptograms. New York, United States: Carroll & Graf. ISBN 978-0-7867-1726-2.
- Dunin, Elonka (April 2006). The Mammoth Book of Secret Code Puzzles. London, United Kingdom: Constable & Robinson. ISBN 978-1-84529-325-3.
- Dunin, Elonka (2009). "Kryptos: The Unsolved Enigma". In Daniel Burstein; Arne de Keijzer (eds.). Secrets of the Lost Symbol: The Unauthorized Guide to the Mysteries Behind The Da Vinci Code Sequel. HarperCollins. pp. 319–326. ISBN 978-0-06-196495-4.
- Dunin, Elonka (2009). "Art, Encryption, and the Preservation of Secrets: An interview with Jim Sanborn". In Daniel Burstein; Arne de Keijzer (eds.). Secrets of the Lost Symbol: The Unauthorized Guide to the Mysteries Behind The Da Vinci Code Sequel. HarperCollins. pp. 294–300. ISBN 978-0-06-196495-4.
- Dunin, Elonka; Schmeh, Klaus (2020). Codebreaking: A Practical Guide. Little, Brown. ISBN 978-1472144218.
- Dunin, Elonka; Ekhall, Magnus; Hamidullin, Konstantin; Lasry, George; Schmeh, Klaus (2022). "How we set new world records in breaking Playfair ciphertexts". Cryptologia. 46 (4): 302–322. doi:10.1080/01611194.2021.1905734. S2CID 238645714.
- Dunin, Elonka; Schmeh, Klaus (2023). Codebreaking: A Practical Guide (Expanded ed.). No Starch Press. ISBN 978-1718502727.
