= David Whatley =

CEO of Simutronics Corporation

- Born: 1966 (age 59–60)
- Occupations: CEO of Simutronics, Game developer

David Whatley (born 1966) is the former president and CEO of Simutronics Corporation, a multiplayer game company in St. Charles, Missouri. He was the co-founder of the company in 1987, and has been a key developer on all of the company's products, including the GemStone series, DragonRealms, Modus Operandi, Alliance of Heroes, and CyberStrike, which won the Online Game of the Year award from Computer Gaming World magazine in 1993.

== Early years ==
Whatley was born August 10, 1966, in St. Louis, Missouri, the youngest of three children to Oscie Whatley, a day lily hybridizer, and Dorothy Whatley, who ran a miniatures store. Whatley attended McCluer North High School, graduating in 1984, and was involved in the early BBS culture, writing the FRPBBS software for his privately owned company, Deep Pan Software. He briefly attended the University of Missouri, St. Louis, in 1985, majoring in communications, but left early to found his own software company.

== Simutronics ==
A passionate gamer, in 1987, at the age of 20, he co-founded Simutronics with Tom and Susan Zelinski, and ran the company from his bedroom in his parents' home. Whatley was president, CEO, and chairman of the board.

The company grew rapidly to the point of grossing $5 million per year, and made the Inc. 500 list in 1999.

Business relationships were developed with every major online service available at the time, including General Electric's GEnie to America Online, Prodigy, and CompuServe. Other partners have included Time Warner, Sony, and Universal Studios.

Simutronics games were the #1 third-party content on America Online, breaking industry records with 2 million user hours per month. Simutronics' flagship product GemStone is the longest-running product line of its type in the world, with customers who have been with the company since 1988. Whatley innovated the concept of online 3D action games, developing the CyberStrike 3D multiplayer game in 1993. The first of its type, it caused Computer Gaming World magazine to create the new category of "Online Game of the Year" so it could be awarded to CyberStrike.

In 2007, Inc. magazine again cited Simutronics, this time as one of the 5000 fastest growing companies of the year.

In 2010, Whatley announced that Simutronics would reorganize into two companies, Simutronics Games and HeroEngine, with Whatley taking over the role as president of Simutronics Games, and Neil Harris as president of HeroEngine.

== Critical Thought Games ==
In 2009, Whatley founded Critical Thought Games to develop his own line of iPhone games. His first title, geoDefense was a critical and financial success, and has continued to be a top seller on the app store. His second title, geoDefense Swarm went on to receive even more critical acclaim, and was named one of Time magazine's "Top 10 Video Games of 2009".

== Products ==
- GemStone II (1988)
- Orb Wars (1988)
- GemStone III (1989)
- CyberStrike (1994)
- Modus Operandi (1995)
- DragonRealms (1996)
- Hercules & Xena: Alliance of Heroes (1998)
- CyberStrike 2 (1998)
- GemStone IV (1998)
- HeroEngine
- geoDefense (2009)
- geoDefense Swarm (2009)
- geoSpark (2010)
- Fantasy University (2010)

== Public speaking ==
- Keynote speaker, 360 iDev Conference, San Jose 2010
- "From Zero to Time Magazine: App Success", Game Developers Conference, 2010
- "The Massively Collaborative Development Paradigm Shift", ION Game Conference, 2008, Seattle
- Austin Game Developers Conference, 2006, MMO Technology Platforms
- AAAS 2006, Virtual Worlds
- GDC 1994, Programming Commercial Virtual Reality

== Writing ==
- "Towards Photorealism in Virtual Botany" in GPU Gems 2: Programming Techniques for High-Performance Graphics and General-Purpose Computation

== Awards ==
- "Online Game of the Year" for CyberStrike, by Computer Gaming World magazine, 1993
- "Best of Show" and "Most Original" for Hero's Journey at E3 2006
- "Inc. 500", Inc. magazine, 1999
- HeroEngine, "Best Development Tool", 2006
- HeroEngine, finalist for "Best Engine" from Game Developer 2006.
