= Metaplace =

Software platform

Metaplace was a software platform intended to democratize the development of virtual worlds, which was later used to make Facebook games. The company was established by Ultima Online and Star Wars Galaxies designer Raph Koster. According to the official website, the platform was "client-agnostic", which means that virtual worlds developed on Metaplace can be accessed using any device that connects to the Web.

== Product summary ==
Metaplace provides user-generated virtual worlds. As Metaplace is browser based, worlds made with Metaplace can connect to each other through hyperlinks. Every object in Metaplace has a unique URL. This character of Metaplace allows advanced users to use these URLs in setting up and reading RSS feeds, set up ad services within worlds, and access and show content from the web within their worlds.

According to founder Raph Koster, Metaplace seeks to "make online world elements... part of the standard code which drives the web"

Metaplace uses a Lua variant called Metascript. Metaplace users can use Metascript to add functionality to any object in their world. These functionalities can be included in Animals and pets, doors, enemies with the ability to fight and attack, puzzles and games, artsy effects, vehicles.

On its release, the official client is slated to use the Adobe Flash plugin. Because the official client used Flash, it did "not allow users to build 3-D worlds," but initially delivered 2D or "2.5D" virtual spaces. However, Areae had stated that they would actively encourage the development of third-party clients, which would allow for 3d functionality.

The system was designed to use a "Thin client", where all the processing that can be done on the server, is, reflecting Raph Koster's philosophy that "The client is in the hands of the enemy."

Other platforms running on a similar philosophy include Bit Whirl and Roblox.

== Company history ==
The platform was originally developed by Areae, but then they officially changed the company name to Metaplace Inc.

Metaplace closed their platform on 1 January 2010. However Metaplace, Inc. continued to remain. After closing the platform, the company pivoted towards using its virtual worlds platform to build social games on Facebook. It released two successful games on Facebook using its platform, Island Life and My Vineyard, after which the company was acquired by Playdom. Shortly after the acquisition of Metaplace Inc., Playdom was acquired by Disney, where it operates as a subsidiary.
