= Stygian Abyss =

Stygian Abyss may refer to:

- Ultima Underworld: The Stygian Abyss, 1992 video game developed by Blue Sky Productions
- Ultima Online: Stygian Abyss, 2009 expansion for the Ultima Online video game developed by Electronic Arts
