= Meridian 59 =

1996 video game

- Developers: Archetype Interactive (1996); Near Death Studios (2002); Open-source (2012–)
- Publishers: The 3DO Company (1996–2000); Near Death Studios (2002–2010)
- Director: Charles Sellers
- Producer: John Hanke
- Designer: Mike Sellers
- Writer: Kevin R. O'Hara
- Platform: Microsoft Windows
- Release: October 7, 1996
- Genre: MMORPG
- Mode: Multiplayer

Meridian 59 is a 1996 video game developed by Archetype Interactive and published by The 3DO Company. It was the first 3D graphical massively multiplayer online role-playing game (MMORPG) and one of the longest running original online role-playing games. The development team included John Hanke, who later founded Niantic, Inc. and codeveloped Google Earth and Pokémon Go.

The game was launched online in an early form on December 15, 1995, and released commercially on October 7, 1996, with a flat-rate monthly subscription. Meridian 59 was later released as open source software, run by original developers Andrew Kirmse and Chris Kirmse.

== Development ==
The game's development began under a different corporate identity and name. Co-founders Mike Sellers and Steve Sellers originally established the studio as Terra Nova Interactive in 1993, with the intent to name their online project Terranova. However, the team received a cease and desist letter from Looking Glass Technologies, which was concurrently developing the tactical 3D sci-fi game Terra Nova: Strike Force Centauri.

To avoid legal costs, the studio rebranded as Archetype Interactive and renamed the game Meridian, a name chosen from one of Mike Sellers' previous role-playing characters. Upon discovering that Meridian was also trademarked, the developers appended the number "59" to create a legally distinct name. The game's lore was later retrofitted to explain the number, establishing the setting as the 59th provincial colony of an ancient empire.

== Gameplay ==
The game is now aimed primarily at fans of PvP (Player vs Player) combat, as it is virtually lag free and has a player-run justice system implemented to mediate killing of other players. Unlike many online RPGs, it is not based around character levels and classes. Instead, each individual skill and attribute, including health, develop independently of one another. Hit points (health) are acquired by killing monsters that are a challenge for the player. Mana (magic points) is acquired by exploring and finding mana nodes in the game world. All base attributes except karma are static, but they can be adjusted with certain items and spells temporarily.

Players can develop their character by obtaining proficiency in skills from seven schools. There is a school of weaponcraft and six schools of magic based on patron gods in the game world's mythos: Shal'ille, Qor, Kraanan, Faren, Riija, and Jala. Each school has a different focus and application in gameplay. Unlike character classes in other MMORPGs, players need not limit themselves to a single school: the rate of learning and total number of proficiency levels across all schools a player can attain is limited by their intelligence stat.

The game contains many features that modern games duplicated later: guilds have a dynamic voting system for changing leadership, customized sigils that appear on shields, and guild halls that can be won or lost. There are also in-game bulletin board systems (called newsglobes), a personal mail system that both players and NPCs can use to send messages, a political meta-game, and frequent expansions that expand the world and gameplay options.

=== Setting ===
Meridian 59 is a typical sword and sorcery setting where adventurers go out and fight monsters. In the game, there are few NPCs, with most of them static and unchanging. Most of the focus is on the activities of the players as they fight against the monsters in the land.

The game is set in the 59th provincial colony of an ancient empire which explored the universe through portals in a magical nexus. However, several hundred years ago, something went wrong and the young frontier colonies in Meridian 59 were separated from the Empire. Now the land is in turmoil. Political factions fight for territory and power, monsters, trolls, orcs, and the undead threaten to destroy all life, and the magical nexus is in a flux, causing disasters across the land. Meridian 59 features six cities and towns: the rebellious mining town of Jasper, the royal city of Barloque, the thriving but troubled Tos, the peaceful farming village of Marion, the crossroads lake-side university town of Cor Noth, and the independent jungle island settlement of Ko'Catan.

=== Schools ===
Weaponcraft - Physical combat, including dodging, parrying, weapons skills, archery, shields, and disarming.

Shal'ille - Based on the patron goddess of rain and peace. Healing, protection, uncursing, harming evil, curing, resurrecting, and making truces.

Qor - Based on the patron goddess of evil and darkness. Damage, blindness, curses, and other ailments to control or harm opponents, as well as invisibility.

Kraanan - Based on the patron god of war and valor. Combat "buffs", resistance to various kinds of spells, attribute modifiers, and miscellaneous other utilitarian spells with practical applications in combat.

Faren - Based on the god of the earth and the elements. Mostly Area of Effect and Direct Damage spells based on lightning, ice, wind, fire, and other natural forces. This school also contains spells to resist the elements.

Riija - Based on the patron god of illusion and trickery. Spells used to deceive players or confuse monsters, including hiding information, summoning illusory minions, and spells to manipulate the mind. Riija is also home to the most powerful teleportation spell in Meridian 59.

Jala - Based on the patron goddess of music and artistry. The School of Jala consists of songs and jingles which have magical effects on all entities in the area, including negation of the effects of the other schools of magic, creation of potions and enchanted magical items, and mana and health regeneration.

=== Organizations ===
Players can join one of three political factions: Jonas D'Accor's rebels, the throne of Princess Kateriina, or that of her rival in Tos, Duke Akardius. Each faction offers certain bonuses to specific types of players. The rebels are seated in Jasper, Kateriina in Barloque, and Akardius in Tos. Players fight one another in the name of their respective factions either for territory or for control of tokens of power which may be used to sway the votes of the councilors of the land.

Players can also join player-created guilds. These are typically just small groups of friends who help each other out and socialize together, but sometimes they are more elaborate than that. There are often guild wars, in which multiple guilds fight one another in mortal combat to seize resources such as a Guild Hall or to declare total dominance of the server.

Previously, players could ally themselves with the warring Necromancer and Hunter factions. These factions each drastically altered the way the game was played for their members, and there were great rewards for killing members of the opposite faction. When Near Death Studios took over control of the game, this element was disabled. Instead, this PvP scenario has been reworked into faction wars. Players take on the role of soldiers under one of the three factions, and each faction gives its soldiers special benefits. Soldiers receive a shield indicating their factional allegiance and gain additional stat rewards when they kill opposing faction members.

== Development ==
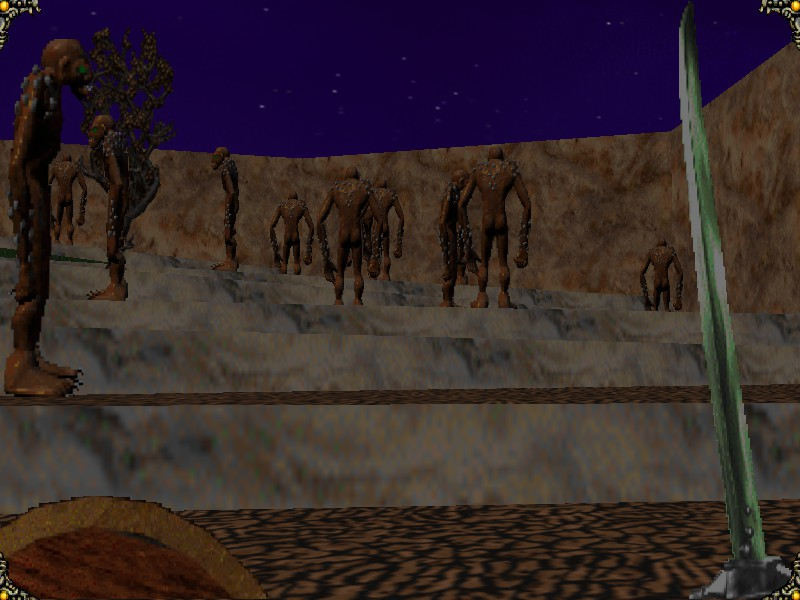
An "overcrowded" game of Meridian 59

Meridian 59 (abbreviated M59) was developed by Archetype Interactive and published in September 1996 by 3DO. Meridian 59 is the only product Archetype Interactive ever released, and the company was acquired by 3DO in June 1996. Archetype was run by Steve Sellers, Mike Sellers, and John Hanke, with Andrew Kirmse and Chris Kirmse filling key technical roles. Damion Schubert contributed to the design along with a team totaling 22 employees and contractors. The game's technological base was initially inspired by Scepter of Goth.

The game was in an early beta stage in April 1996 when it was noticed by Kevin Hester and other game developers at 3DO. Trip Hawkins, CEO of 3DO, recognized the forward-looking value of the game and the company, and 3DO bought Archetype in June 1996.

The characters were structured so that faces are presented in the highest resolution, while the less important torso and legs use a lower resolution in order to increase access speed. Approximately 17,000 players joined the game's public beta that lasted up until its worldwide commercial launch on October 7, 1996, beating its next major rival, Ultima Online, by approximately a year. The servers divided players into parallel game worlds, each populated by a few hundred people, in order to keep each world from being overly crowded.

Prior to its release, the term "massively multiplayer" and the acronym "MMPRPG", "Massively Multi-Player Role-Playing Game", emerged in meetings within 3DO (beating out other monikers such as "large-n game"), as did the now-ubiquitous monthly subscription model. At the time, AOL was still charging per minute for online access, though a change to flat fees was anticipated. The game has received various updates throughout its life, each adding new monsters, spells, and areas. In its early years it was commonly conceived of as a graphical MUD, though this term, and Meridian 59's preferred "MMPRPG", was eventually displaced by the now-ubiquitous "massively multiplayer online role-playing game", a term coined by Richard Garriott of Ultima Online in 1997.

3DO shut down the game on August 31, 2000 and it was re-released by Near Death Studios, Inc. in 2002. Near Death Studios was co-founded by former Meridian 59 developers Rob "Q" Ellis and Brian "Psychochild" Green. A new rendering engine was added to the game in the Evolution expansion in October 2004, offering an alternative to its Doom-esque graphics. This expansion also includes features like dynamic lighting, rebindable keys, mouselook, and other visual improvements.

Shortly after 3DO shut the game down on August 31, 2000 a developer of the game leaked the server software and the files for Meridian 59: Renaissance to a player, and since then there has been a community of free-to-play servers.

Near Death Studios announced that the company would be ceasing operations on January 6, 2010, after which Meridian 59 would continue running, but not as a commercial concern of Near Death Studios. In February 2010, Meridian 59 was turned over to the original technical developers, Andrew and Chris Kirmse. On September 15, 2012, the team released the game to the public as freeware and most of the source code under the GPLv2 license. For a while, Meridian 59 had an international presence, with servers operating in Germany, run by the company MDO (active 2002–2009), and Russia, in addition to a Sacred Haven (non-PvP) server operated by Skotos. These are no longer operational.

== Reception ==
Reception

Review scores
Publication	Score
Computer Games Strategy Plus	3.5/5
Computer Gaming World	3.5/5
GamePro	A−
Next Generation	3/5

Reviewing the "Revelation" update, Next Generation described the game as "second-best" next to Ultima Online. They particularly commented that while the update expanded the game world by 50%, it still felt small and overcrowded with too little to do in it.

By June 1999, Meridian 59's retail sales in the United States had reached 14,359 units, according to PC Data. A writer for GameDaily called these numbers "minuscule", and remarked that it had "clearly fizzled on store shelves". However, the publication noted that 3DO had changed its business model to rely on online shopping and microtransactions, and had seen monetary success despite its poor sales in stores. Next Generation columnist Christian Svensson commented that despite the game's monthly pricing being roundly derided by a panel consisting of the heads of seven leading online gaming services at the September 1996 Online Game Developer's Conference, who said any flat rate system was unsustainable and "naive", "Since that time, we have seen the official launch of many online gaming services, and most have learned what consumers and the press have been telling them all along: A fair flat rate is the only way services will get subscribers."

The game received multiple awards, including the fantasy-role-playing game of the year for 1996. It was a finalist for Computer Gaming World's 1996 "Role-Playing Game of the Year" award, which ultimately went to The Elder Scrolls II: Daggerfall. However, it won CNET Gamecenter's award in this category. The editors called it "arguably one of the truest role-playing games ever." The Dark Auspices expansion was named as a finalist by the Academy of Interactive Arts & Sciences for "Online Role-Playing Game of the Year at the 2nd Annual Interactive Achievement Awards, which ultimately went to Ultima Online: The Second Age.

The game is known as the first 3D graphical massively multiplayer online role-playing game (MMORPG) and stands as one of the longest running original online role-playing games.
