= Age of Shadows =

Age of Shadows may refer to:

- "Age of Shadows", a song from the 2008 album 01011001 by Ayreon
- Ultima Online: Age of Shadows, 2003 video game expansion pack
- The Age of Shadows, 2016 South Korean film
