= GeoDefense Swarm =

2008 video game

geoDefense Swarm
- Developer: Critical Thought Games
- Writer: David Whatley
- Series: geoDefense
- Platforms: iOS, Windows Phone
- Release: 2008
- Genre: Tower defense

geoDefense Swarm is a tower defense game by American studio Critical Thought Games available for the iOS and Windows Phone devices. Released on September 14, 2009, it is a sequel to geoDefense, released by Critical Thought Games in 2008.

== Gameplay ==
Over 7 defense tower types can be purchased by dragging and dropping them onto the map. Amount of dollars earned are dependent on which enemies are destroyed. Later levels include the new addition of vortex towers that can be linked to defense towers that increase damage.

== Stages ==
The game has three difficulty settings with 10 levels each. Each level consists of several waves of enemies attempting to make it across each map. Maps vary across stages and include preset obstacles and pathways that can either impede or increase enemies speed.

Downloadable content levels were released that include 5 new medium levels and 6 new hard levels.

== Production and updates ==
The game has evolved from the original and is available on the iPhone and iPod Touch.

On August 19, 2009, Critical Thought Games released a bug fix update.

"I've been holding my breath for the last several weeks as Geo-Defense Swarm went through the review process - and now it's out!", said David Whatley, CEO of Critical Thought Games.

== Reception ==
Several gaming sites have awarded Geo Defense Swarm high ratings. AppAdvice gave it a "must buy" rating of 4.5/5 and 3xGamer gave it 4 out of 5 stars.
