= CyberStrike =

1993 video game

- Developer: Simutronics
- Publisher: MicroProse
- Designer: David Whatley
- Series: CyberStrike
- Platform: MS-DOS
- Release: February 1993 (GEnie); November 1994 (retail)
- Genre: Mech simulation
- Modes: Single-player, multiplayer

CyberStrike is a futuristic 3D combat online game by Simutronics, involving team combat between customizable mechs, each of which is controlled by a different player.

Initially exclusive to the GEnie online service, it opened in February 1993, and later that year it caused Computer Gaming World to create the new category of "Online Game of the Year" so it could be awarded to CyberStrike. In 1994, it was offered in stores by MicroProse. It was also released on America Online and then via an official website. Simutronics released a sequel, CyberStrike 2, in 1998 and a spiritual successor, Galahad 3093, in 2021.

== Development and release ==
CyberStrike was chiefly designed by David Whatley, co-founder of the online multiplayer game pioneer Simutronics. Product manager Elonka Dunin stated that she adopted much of the company's administrative roles when she joined in 1990, allowing Whatley to focus on CyberStrike and even develop his own 3D game engine for it. Whatley said that the team's goal was to ease the entry of new players into the emerging online multiplayer format. "We wanted to create a game that anyone can get into and have fun," he stated. "Learning to play shouldn't even require a manual, and once you get started, there's lots of action to hold your interest." This led to a design philosophy of "easy to learn but difficult to master" for first-time players. Simutronics claimed that the project's budget was only $7,000 USD, a small fraction of the industry standard at the time. Production time was also truncated with Whatley describing the game as “a fast-paced, graphical experience utilizing modern programming techniques that shortened its development cycle dramatically."

CyberStrike demoed on the online service GEnie in August 1992 before launching for an hourly play cost in February 1993. A prototype build that utilized virtual reality headset was demonstrated at the annual Gen Con gaming convention later that year. The game received an update in late 1994 that improved start-up times and added strategy variations and realism. Most notably, equipping more modules to a CyberPod would add weight and cause it to move more sluggishly. A stand-alone, boxed version for MS-DOS was released by MicroProse in November 1994. CyberStrike shifted its pay-by-the-hour model to America Online, having reached its final stage of testing by January 1997. The price was cut for this iteration due to an increasing prevalence of online games and competition among GEnie, AOL, and Prodigy. Finally, the game was offered via an official website that launched on August 4, 1997.

== Reception and legacy ==
In a 1993 review, David M. Wilson of Computer Gaming World praised the simple user interface and "amazing" graphics, including the weather. The reviewer reported that he played for nearly 12 hours straight, concluding that "CyberStrike is addictive, action-filled and downright fun. The violence is bloodless ... but the challenge is exhilarating". That year the magazine named CyberStrike as its first ever On-Line Game of the Year. A 1994 survey of strategic space games in the magazine gave the game four stars out of five, stating that it was "very competitive in a multi-player environment but lacks the long-term rationale of Multiplayer BattleTech".

Simutronics made a sequel, CyberStrike 2, released in 1998, as well as a spiritual successor, Galahad 3093, released as an open beta in 2021. This latter game began production under the working title "CyberStrike 3".

Everquest co-creator John Smedley considered CyberStrike as very influential and that it sparked his interest in developing online games. Contrarily, when discussing the future of online gaming in a 1996 interview Infocom designer Brian Moriarty criticized CyberStrike as not being well-designed due to an alleged tendency for skilled players to gatekeep newer players even in beginner-level environments.
