= D.I.C.E. Award for Online Game of the Year =

Annual award presented by the Academy of Interactive Arts & Sciences

- Country: United States
- Presented by: Academy of Interactive Arts & Sciences
- First award: 1998
- Currently held by: ARC Raiders
- Website: www.interactive.org

The D.I.C.E. Award for Online Game of the Year is an award presented annually by the Academy of Interactive Arts & Sciences during the D.I.C.E. Awards. This award "celebrates titles of any genre with a significant portion of the gameplay experience transpiring online — collaboratively or competitively. These titles frequently offer excellent matchmaking systems, innovative gameplay options, persistent content releases that further evolve gameplay, user customization and fluidity of gameplay. Titles submitted in this category are not limited to release within the calendar year but must be supported by significant new content". All active creative/technical, business, and affiliate members of the Academy are qualified to vote for this category. The first winner was Ultima Online at the 1st Annual Interactive Achievement Awards. It is the only "Game of the Year award" that also has been offered as a genre award and craft award.

The award's most recent winner is ARC Raiders, developed and published by Embark Studios.

== History ==
=== Content/Genre Award ===
Online Game of the Year was originally offered as a content award for the "Online content awards" subset with categories Entertainment Site of the Year and News/Information Site of the Year. The 2nd Annual Interactive Achievement Awards (1999) had multiple genre-specific "Online content awards." Only one online award was offered for 2000. It would be renamed Online Gameplay of the Year in 2001.

- Online Game of the Year (1998, 2000)
- Online Action/Strategy Game of the Year (1999)
- Online Family/Board Game of the Year (1999)
- Online Role Playing Game of the Year (1999)
- Online Gameplay of the Year (2001—2003)

No award would be offered at the 7th Annual Interactive Achievement Awards.

=== Craft Award ===
At the 8th Annual Interactive Achievement Awards, the award for Online Gameplay was reintroduced as a craft award. The Outstanding Achievement in Online Gameplay, is "presented to the individual or team whose work represents the highest level of achievement in online gameplay in an interactive title. These titles frequently offer excellent matchmaking systems, innovative gameplay options including collaborative and competitive gameplay, user customization and fluidity of gameplay." An additional craft award, the Outstanding Achievement in Connectivity, was introduced for the 15th Annual Interactive Achievement Awards. This award is "given to the property or title that best demonstrates innovation in connection mechanics across varied platforms. This is typically exemplified through the expansion of a story or narrative through complementary elements across two or more platforms (e.g. Console/Facebook or Console/Mobile Device)". Both awards would be voted by programmers.

- Outstanding Achievement in Online Gameplay (2005—2013)
- Outstanding Achievement in Connectivity (2012—2013)

=== Game of the Year Award ===
The craft awards were dropped for the 17th Annual D.I.C.E. Awards and Online Game of the Year was reintroduced as a "Game of the Year Award." The award was relabeled Outstanding Achievement in Online Gameplay for the 2015 awards and relabeled again as Online Game of the Year for the 2019 awards.

- Online Game of the Year (2014, 2019—present)
- Outstanding Achievement in Online Gameplay (2015—2018)

=== Social Networking/Web Based Game of the Year ===
A genre award for Social Networking Game of the Year was introduced for the 2010 awards. Social networking games were defined as games that "connect people through a collective game experience, allowing quick, easy, and fun interactions between real-life friends". The genre category for "Social Networking" was not offered for 2013, and a "Game of the Year" award for Web Based Game of the Year was offered. Web based games were described as "titles played within a web browser and can include a variety of genres such as social networking games, MMOs, RPGs, Action games. These titles are tailored to the technical parameters of web browsers (Internet Explorer, Chrome, Safari, and Firefox) and demonstrate a skilled usage of linking, sharing, and work equally well across multiple form factors and input mechanisms". Web Based Game of the Year was featured in the rules & procedures for 2014, but there were not any finalists named for the category.

- Social Networking Game of the Year (2010—2012)
- Web Based Game of the Year (2013)

== Winners and nominees ==
=== 1990s ===
Table key
| Indicates the winner |

| Year | Game | Developer(s) | Publisher(s) | Ref. |
|---|---|---|---|---|
| 1997/1998 (1st) | Ultima Online | Origin Systems | Electronic Arts | |
| 1997/1998 (1st) | Air Warrior II | Kesmai | Interactive Magic | |
| 1997/1998 (1st) | Aliens Online | Kesmai, Mythic Entertainment | Fox Interactive | |
| 1997/1998 (1st) | Gemstone III | Simutronics | Simutronics | |
| 1997/1998 (1st) | SubSpace | Burst Studios | Virgin Interactive | |
| 1998/1999 (2nd) | Online Action/Strategy Game of the Year | | | |
| 1998/1999 (2nd) | Starsiege: Tribes | Dynamix | Sierra On-Line | |
| 1998/1999 (2nd) | Air Warrior III | Kesmai | Interactive Magic | |
| 1998/1999 (2nd) | CyberStrike 2 | Simutronics | 989 Studios | |
| 1998/1999 (2nd) | Online Role Playing Game of the Year | | | |
| 1998/1999 (2nd) | Ultima Online: The Second Age | Origin Systems | Electronic Arts | |
| 1998/1999 (2nd) | DragonRealms: Maritime Expansion | Simutronics | Simutronics | |
| 1998/1999 (2nd) | Meridian 59: Dark Auspices | Archetype Interactive | The 3DO Company | |
| 1998/1999 (2nd) | Online Family/Board Game of the Year (Note: Tie between finalists.) | | | |
| 1998/1999 (2nd) | Multiplayer Jeopardy! Online | Sony Online Entertainment | Sony Online Entertainment | |
| 1998/1999 (2nd) | What's the Big Idea? | Berkeley Systems | Berkeley Systems | |
| 1998/1999 (2nd) | Multiplayer Wheel of Fortune Online | Sony Online Entertainment | Sony Online Entertainment | |
| 1998/1999 (2nd) | The Game of LIFE | Mass Media Games | Hasbro Interactive | |
| 1999/2000 (3rd) | EverQuest | Verant Interactive, 989 Studios | Sony Online Entertainment | |
| 1999/2000 (3rd) | Asheron's Call | Turbine | Microsoft Games | |
| 1999/2000 (3rd) | Get the Picture | Berkeley Systems | Berkeley Systems | |
| 1999/2000 (3rd) | Pop-Tarts | Magnet Interactive | Magnet Interactive | |
| 1999/2000 (3rd) | Wordox | World Opponent Network | Sierra On-Line | |

=== 2000s ===
| Year | Game | Developer(s) | Publisher(s) | Ref. |
|---|---|---|---|---|
| 2000 (4th) | MechWarrior 4: Vengeance | FASA Interactive | Microsoft Games | |
| 2000 (4th) | Clusterball | Daydream Software | RealNetworks | |
| 2000 (4th) | Command & Conquer: Red Alert 2 | Westwood Pacific | Electronic Arts | |
| 2000 (4th) | Ultima Online: Renaissance | Origin Systems | Electronic Arts | |
| 2001 (5th) | Return to Castle Wolfenstein | Gray Matter Studios | Activision | |
| 2001 (5th) | Aliens Versus Predator 2 | Monolith Productions | Sierra On-Line | |
| 2001 (5th) | MechWarrior 4: Black Knight | FASA Interactive | Microsoft Game Studios | |
| 2001 (5th) | Monopoly Tycoon | Deep Red Games | Infogrames | |
| 2001 (5th) | Tom Clancy's Ghost Recon | Red Storm Entertainment | Ubisoft | |
| 2002 (6th) | Battlefield 1942 | DICE | Electronic Arts | |
| 2002 (6th) | Command & Conquer: Renegade | Westwood Pacific | Electronic Arts | |
| 2002 (6th) | Twisted Metal: Black - Online | Incognito Entertainment | Sony Computer Entertainment | |
2003 (7th)
| 2003 (7th) | No award given | | | |
| 2004 (8th) | Halo 2 | Bungie | Microsoft Game Studios | |
| 2004 (8th) | Rome: Total War | Creative Assembly | Activision | |
| 2004 (8th) | Unreal Tournament 2004 | Epic Games, Digital Extremes | Atari | |
| 2004 (8th) | Warhammer 40,000: Dawn of War | Relic Entertainment | THQ | |
| 2005 (9th) | Battlefield 2 | DICE | Electronic Arts | |
| 2005 (9th) | Age of Empires III | Ensemble Studios | Microsoft Game Studios | |
| 2005 (9th) | Call of Duty 2 | Infinity Ward | Activision | |
| 2005 (9th) | Mario Kart DS | Nintendo EAD | Nintendo | |
| 2005 (9th) | Project Gotham Racing 3 | Bizarre Creations | Microsoft Game Studios | |
| 2006 (10th) | Gears of War | Epic Games | Microsoft Game Studios | |
| 2006 (10th) | Battlefield 2142 | DICE | Electronic Arts | |
| 2006 (10th) | Call of Duty 3 | Treyarch | Activision | |
| 2006 (10th) | Chromehounds | FromSoftware | Sega | |
| 2006 (10th) | Tom Clancy's Ghost Recon Advanced Warfighter | Red Storm Entertainment, Ubisoft Paris | Ubisoft | |
| 2007 (11th) | Call of Duty 4: Modern Warfare | Infinity Ward | Activision | |
| 2007 (11th) | Forza Motorsport 2 | Turn 10 Studios | Microsoft Game Studios | |
| 2007 (11th) | Halo 3 | Bungie | Microsoft Game Studios | |
| 2007 (11th) | Rock Band | Harmonix | MTV Games | |
| 2007 (11th) | World in Conflict | Massive Entertainment | Vivendi Games | |
| 2008 (12th) | Left 4 Dead | Valve South | Valve | |
| 2008 (12th) | Call of Duty: World at War | Treyarch | Activision | |
| 2008 (12th) | Gears of War 2 | Epic Games | Microsoft Game Studios | |
| 2008 (12th) | NHL 09 | EA Canada | Electronic Arts | |
| 2008 (12th) | Rock Band 2 | Harmonix | MTV Games | |
| 2009 (13th) | Outstanding Achievement in Online Gameplay | | | |
| 2009 (13th) | Call of Duty: Modern Warfare 2 | Infinity Ward | Activision | |
| 2009 (13th) | Borderlands | Gearbox Software | 2K Games | |
| 2009 (13th) | FarmVille | Zynga | Zynga | |
| 2009 (13th) | Left 4 Dead 2 | Valve | Valve | |
| 2009 (13th) | Uncharted 2: Among Thieves | Naughty Dog | Sony Computer Entertainment | |
| 2009 (13th) | Social Networking Game of the Year | | | |
| 2009 (13th) | FarmVille | Zynga | Zynga | |
| 2009 (13th) | Bejeweled Blitz | PopCap Games | Electronic Arts | |
| 2009 (13th) | Farm Town | Codebell | Codebell | |
| 2009 (13th) | Restaurant City | Playfish | Electronic Arts | |

=== 2010s ===
| Year | Game | Developer(s) | Publisher(s) | Ref. |
|---|---|---|---|---|
| 2010 (14th) | Outstanding Achievement in Online Gameplay | | | |
| 2010 (14th) | StarCraft II: Wings of Liberty | Blizzard Entertainment | Blizzard Entertainment | |
| 2010 (14th) | Assassin's Creed: Brotherhood | Ubisoft Montreal | Ubisoft | |
| 2010 (14th) | Battlefield: Bad Company 2 | DICE | Electronic Arts | |
| 2010 (14th) | Call of Duty: Black Ops | Treyarch | Activision | |
| 2010 (14th) | Halo: Reach | Bungie | Microsoft Game Studios | |
| 2010 (14th) | Social Networking Game of the Year | | | |
| 2010 (14th) | CityVille | Zynga | Zynga | |
| 2010 (14th) | Family Feud | Backstage Technologies | Backstage Technologies | |
| 2010 (14th) | FrontierVille | Zynga | Zynga | |
| 2010 (14th) | Nightclub City | Booyah | Booyah | |
| 2010 (14th) | Ravenwood Fair | Lolapps | Lolapps | |
| 2011 (15th) | Outstanding Achievement in Online Gameplay | | | |
| 2011 (15th) | Star Wars: The Old Republic | BioWare Austin | Electronic Arts | |
| 2011 (15th) | Battlefield 3 | DICE | Electronic Arts | |
| 2011 (15th) | Call of Duty: Modern Warfare 3 | Infinity Ward | Activision | |
| 2011 (15th) | Gears of War 3 | Epic Games | Microsoft Game Studios | |
| 2011 (15th) | LittleBigPlanet 2 | Media Molecule | Sony Computer Entertainment | |
| 2011 (15th) | Outstanding Achievement in Connectivity | | | |
| 2011 (15th) | Portal 2 | Valve | Valve | |
| 2011 (15th) | Battlefield 3 | DICE | Electronic Arts | |
| 2011 (15th) | Call of Duty: Modern Warfare 3 | Infinity Ward | Activision | |
| 2011 (15th) | Dragon Age II | BioWare | Electronic Arts | |
| 2011 (15th) | Uncharted 3: Drake's Deception | Naughty Dog | Sony Computer Entertainment | |
| 2011 (15th) | Social Networking Game of the Year | | | |
| 2011 (15th) | The Sims Social | Playfish | Electronic Arts | |
| 2011 (15th) | Army Attack | Digital Chocolate | Digital Chocolate | |
| 2011 (15th) | CastleVille | Zynga Dallas | Zynga | |
| 2011 (15th) | Gardens of Time | Playdom | Disney Interactive | |
| 2011 (15th) | Triple Town | Spry Fox | Playdom | |
| 2012 (16th) | Outstanding Achievement in Online Gameplay | | | |
| 2012 (16th) | Journey | Thatgamecompany | Sony Computer Entertainment | |
| 2012 (16th) | Borderlands 2 | Gearbox Software | 2K Games | |
| 2012 (16th) | Call of Duty: Black Ops II | Treyarch | Activision | |
| 2012 (16th) | Diablo III | Blizzard Entertainment | Blizzard Entertainment | |
| 2012 (16th) | Halo 4 | 343 Industries | Microsoft Studios | |
| 2012 (16th) | Outstanding Achievement in Connectivity | | | |
| 2012 (16th) | Halo 4 | 343 Industries | Microsoft Studios | |
| 2012 (16th) | Call of Duty: Black Ops II | Treyarch | Activision | |
| 2012 (16th) | Nike+ Kinect Training | Sumo Digital | Microsoft Studios | |
| 2012 (16th) | Web Based Game of the Year | | | |
| 2012 (16th) | SimCity Social | Playfish | Electronic Arts | |
| 2012 (16th) | Bingo Bash | Bash Gaming | Bash Gaming | |
| 2012 (16th) | Burrito Bison Revenge | Juicy Beast Studio | Adult Swim Games | |
| 2012 (16th) | CityVille 2 | Zynga | Zynga | |
| 2012 (16th) | SongPop | FreshPlanet | Gameloft | |
| 2013 (17th) | World of Tanks | Wargaming | Wargaming | |
| 2013 (17th) | Battlefield 4 | DICE | Electronic Arts | |
| 2013 (17th) | Borderlands 2 | Gearbox Software | 2K Games | |
| 2013 (17th) | Diablo III | Blizzard Entertainment | Blizzard Entertainment | |
| 2013 (17th) | The Last of Us | Naughty Dog | Sony Computer Entertainment | |
| 2014 (18th) | Destiny | Bungie | Activision | |
| 2014 (18th) | Call of Duty: Advanced Warfare | Sledgehammer Games | Activision | |
| 2014 (18th) | Elite Dangerous | Frontier Developments | Frontier Developments | |
| 2014 (18th) | Hearthstone: Heroes of Warcraft | Blizzard Entertainment | Blizzard Entertainment | |
| 2014 (18th) | World of Tanks [Xbox 360] | Wargaming | Wargaming | |
| 2015 (19th) | Rocket League | Psyonix | Psyonix | |
| 2015 (19th) | Destiny: The Taken King | Bungie | Activision | |
| 2015 (19th) | Halo 5: Guardians | 343 Industries | Microsoft Studios | |
| 2015 (19th) | Hearthstone: Heroes of Warcraft | Blizzard Entertainment | Blizzard Entertainment | |
| 2015 (19th) | Splatoon | Nintendo EAD | Nintendo | |
| 2016 (20th) | Overwatch | Blizzard Entertainment | Blizzard Entertainment | |
| 2016 (20th) | Battlefield 1 | DICE | Electronic Arts | |
| 2016 (20th) | Hearthstone: Heroes of Warcraft | Blizzard Entertainment | Blizzard Entertainment | |
| 2016 (20th) | Titanfall 2 | Respawn Entertainment | Electronic Arts | |
| 2016 (20th) | Tom Clancy's The Division | Massive Entertainment | Ubisoft | |
| 2017 (21st) | PlayerUnknown's Battlegrounds | PUBG Corporation | Bluehole | |
| 2017 (21st) | Call of Duty: WWII | Sledgehammer Games | Activision | |
| 2017 (21st) | Destiny 2 | Bungie | Activision | |
| 2017 (21st) | Fortnite | Epic Games | Epic Games | |
| 2017 (21st) | Tom Clancy's Ghost Recon: Wildlands | Ubisoft Paris | Ubisoft | |
| 2018 (22nd) | Fortnite | Epic Games | Epic Games | |
| 2018 (22nd) | Destiny 2: Forsaken | Bungie | Activision | |
| 2018 (22nd) | Laser League | Roll7 | 505 Games | |
| 2018 (22nd) | Red Dead Redemption 2 | Rockstar Studios | Rockstar Games | |
| 2018 (22nd) | Sea of Thieves | Rare | Microsoft Studios | |
| 2019 (23rd) | Apex Legends | Respawn Entertainment | Electronic Arts | |
| 2019 (23rd) | Call of Duty: Modern Warfare | Infinity Ward | Activision | |
| 2019 (23rd) | Destiny 2: Shadowkeep | Bungie | Bungie | |
| 2019 (23rd) | Tetris 99 | Arika | Nintendo | |
| 2019 (23rd) | Wargroove | Chucklefish | Chucklefish | |

=== 2020s ===
| Year | Game | Developer(s) | Publisher(s) | Ref. |
|---|---|---|---|---|
| 2020 (24th) | Fall Guys: Ultimate Knockout | Mediatonic | Devolver Digital | |
| 2020 (24th) | Animal Crossing: New Horizons | Nintendo EPD | Nintendo | |
| 2020 (24th) | Call of Duty: Black Ops Cold War | Treyarch | Activision | |
| 2020 (24th) | Ghost of Tsushima | Sucker Punch Productions | Sony Interactive Entertainment | |
| 2020 (24th) | Tetris Effect: Connected | Monstars, Resonair, Stage Games | Enhance Games | |
| 2021 (25th) | Halo Infinite | 343 Industries | Xbox Game Studios | |
| 2021 (25th) | Back 4 Blood | Turtle Rock Studios | Warner Bros. Games | |
| 2021 (25th) | Call of Duty: Vanguard | Sledgehammer Games | Activision | |
| 2021 (25th) | Final Fantasy XIV: Endwalker | Square Enix | Square Enix | |
| 2021 (25th) | Knockout City | Velan Studios | Electronic Arts | |
| 2022 (26th) | Final Fantasy XIV: Endwalker | Square Enix | Square Enix | |
| 2022 (26th) | Call of Duty: Modern Warfare II | Infinity Ward | Activision | |
| 2022 (26th) | FIFA 23 | EA Vancouver, EA Romania | Electronic Arts | |
| 2022 (26th) | Marvel Snap | Second Dinner | Nuverse | |
| 2022 (26th) | Rumbleverse | Iron Galaxy | Epic Games | |
| 2023 (27th) | Diablo IV | Blizzard Entertainment | Blizzard Entertainment | |
| 2023 (27th) | Call of Duty: Modern Warfare III | Sledgehammer Games | Activision | |
| 2023 (27th) | Omega Strikers | Odyssey Interactive | Odyssey Interactive | |
| 2023 (27th) | Street Fighter 6 | Capcom | Capcom | |
| 2023 (27th) | The Finals | Embark Studios | Embark Studios | |
| 2024 (28th) | Helldivers 2 | Arrowhead Game Studios | Sony Interactive Entertainment | |
| 2024 (28th) | Call of Duty: Black Ops 6 | Treyarch | Activision | |
| 2024 (28th) | Diablo IV: Vessel of Hatred | Blizzard Entertainment | Blizzard Entertainment | |
| 2024 (28th) | Marvel Rivals | NetEase Games | NetEase Games | |
| 2024 (28th) | Warhammer 40,000: Space Marine 2 | Saber Interactive | Focus Entertainment | |
| 2025 (29th) | ARC Raiders | Embark Studios | Embark Studios | |
| 2025 (29th) | Battlefield 6 | Battlefield Studios (Note: Battlefield Studios ("BF Studios" for short) is a collaborative effort between DICE, Ripple Effect Studios, Criterion Games, and Motive Studio; Ridgeline Games also contributed to its development before its closure in 2024.) | Electronic Arts | |
| 2025 (29th) | Mario Kart World | Nintendo EPD | Nintendo | |
| 2025 (29th) | Marvel Rivals | NetEase Games | NetEase Games | |
| 2025 (29th) | Split Fiction | Hazelight Studios | Electronic Arts | |

== Multiple nominations and wins ==
=== Developers and publishers ===
Blizzard Entertainment and DICE have developed the most nominees, with Blizzard Entertainmeint winning the most awards. Origin Systems, Playfish, and Zynga are the only developers with back-to-back wins. Treyarch has developed the most finalists without having a winner. 343 Industries, DICE, Infinity Ward, and Treyarch have finalists named for both Online Gameplay and Connectivity. Zynga is the only developer/publisher with a finalist for the Outstanding Achievement in Online Gameplay and Social Networking Game of the Year.

Electronic Arts has published the most finalists and the most wins. Electronic Arts is also one of two publishers with back-to-back wins, with the other being Zynga. Nintendo and Ubisoft have published the most finalists without having a winner.

Developers
| Developer | Nominations | Wins |
|---|---|---|
| Blizzard Entertainment | 9 | 3 |
| DICE (Note: includes collaboration with multiple studios known as Battlefield Studios ("BF Studios" for short)) | 9 | 2 |
| Bungie | 8 | 2 |
| Infinity Ward | 7 | 2 |
| Epic Games | 6 | 2 |
| Zynga | 6 | 2 |
| 343 Industries | 4 | 2 |
| Origin Systems | 3 | 2 |
| Playfish | 3 | 2 |
| Embark Studios | 2 | 1 |
| FASA Interactive | 2 | 1 |
| Respawn Entertainment | 2 | 1 |
| Sony Online Entertainment | 2 | 1 |
| Square Enix | 2 | 1 |
| Turtle Rock Studios/Valve South | 2 | 1 |
| Valve | 2 | 1 |
| Wargaming | 2 | 1 |
| Treyarch | 7 | 0 |
| Nintendo EAD/EPD | 4 | 0 |
| Sledgehammer Games | 4 | 0 |
| Gearbox Software | 3 | 0 |
| Kesmai | 3 | 0 |
| Naughty Dog | 3 | 0 |
| Simutronics | 3 | 0 |
| Berkeley Systems | 2 | 0 |
| Harmonix | 2 | 0 |
| Massive Entertainment | 2 | 0 |
| NetEase Games | 2 | 0 |
| Red Storm Entertainment | 2 | 0 |
| Ubisoft Paris | 2 | 0 |
| Westwood Pacific | 2 | 0 |

Publishers
| Publisher | Nominations | Wins |
|---|---|---|
| Electronic Arts | 26 | 8 |
| Microsoft/Xbox Game Studios | 18 | 5 |
| Activision | 24 | 4 |
| Sony Online/Computer/Interactive Entertainment | 11 | 4 |
| Blizzard Entertainment | 9 | 3 |
| Zynga | 6 | 2 |
| Valve | 3 | 2 |
| Epic Games | 3 | 1 |
| Sierra On-Line | 3 | 1 |
| Embark Studios | 2 | 1 |
| Square Enix | 2 | 1 |
| Wargaming | 2 | 1 |
| Nintendo | 5 | 0 |
| Ubisoft | 5 | 0 |
| 2K Games | 3 | 0 |
| Berkeley Systems | 2 | 0 |
| Interactive Magic | 2 | 0 |
| MTV Games | 2 | 0 |
| NetEase Games | 2 | 0 |
| Simutronics | 2 | 0 |

=== Franchises ===
The most nominated franchises have been Call of Duty, Battlefield, and Halo. Halo won the most awards with three, with Call of Duty and Battlefield having won twice. The only other two-time winning franchise is Ultima, which is also the only franchise with back-to-back wins in this category.

There have been numerous games that have been nominated multiple times:

- Ultima Online won in 1998, the expansion pack The Second Age won Online Role-Playing Game of the Year in 1999, and the expansion pack Renaissance was nominated in 2001.
- MechWarrior 4: Vengeance won in 2001, and the expansion pack Black Knight was nominated in 2002.
- FarmVille was nominated for Online Gameplay and won Social Networking Game of the Year in 2010.
- Battlefield 3 was nominated for both Online Gameplay and Connectivity in 2012.
- Call of Duty: Modern Warfare 3 was nominated for both Online Gameplay and Connectivity in 2012.
- Call of Duty: Black Ops II was nominated for both Online Gameplay and Connectivity in 2013.
- Halo 4 was nominated for Online Gameplay and won Connectivity in 2013.
- Borderlands 2 was nominated in 2013 and 2014.
- Diablo III was nominated in 2013 and 2014.
- World of Tanks won in 2014, and the Xbox 360 version was nominated in 2015.
- Destiny won in 2015, and the expansion pack The Taken King was nominated in 2016.
- Hearthstone: Heroes of Warcraft was nominated in 2015, 2016, and 2017.
- Destiny 2 was nominated in 2018, the expansion pack Forsaken was nominated in 2019, and the expansion pack Shadowkeep was nominated in 2020.
- Fortnite was nominated in 2018, and won in 2019.
- Final Fantasy XIV: Endwalker was nominated in 2022, and won in 2023.
- Diablo IV won the award in 2024, while the Vessel of Hatred expansion was nominated in 2025.
- Marvel Rivals was nominated in 2025 and 2026.

Ultima Online is the only game to have won twice, and is one of three games nominated three times, with the other games being Hearthstone: Heroes of Warcraft and Destiny 2. Fortnite and Final Fantasy XIV: Endwalker are the only games that have lost on their first nomination and win on their second nomination.

Franchises
| Franchise | Nominations | Wins |
|---|---|---|
| Halo | 7 | 3 |
| Call of Duty | 18 | 2 |
| Battlefield | 9 | 2 |
| Ultima | 3 | 2 |
| Destiny | 5 | 1 |
| Diablo | 4 | 1 |
| Gears of War | 3 | 1 |
| CityVille | 2 | 1 |
| FarmVille | 2 | 1 |
| Final Fantasy | 2 | 1 |
| Fortnite | 2 | 1 |
| Left 4 Dead | 2 | 1 |
| MechWarrior | 2 | 1 |
| Titanfall (Note: Apex Legends is a Titanfall spin-off.) | 2 | 1 |
| World of Tanks | 2 | 1 |
| Tom Clancy's | 4 | 0 |
| Borderlands | 3 | 0 |
| Marvel | 3 | 0 |
| Warcraft | 3 | 0 |
| Air Warrior | 2 | 0 |
| Alien | 2 | 0 |
| Command & Conquer | 2 | 0 |
| Mario Kart | 2 | 0 |
| Rock Band | 2 | 0 |
| Tetris | 2 | 0 |
| Uncharted | 2 | 0 |
