= GeoDefense =

2008 video game

geoDefense
- Developer: Critical Thought Games
- Writer: David Whatley
- Series: geoDefense
- Platforms: iOS, Windows Phone
- Release: 2008
- Genre: Tower defense

geoDefense is a 2008 tower defense game created for iOS devices developed by American studio Critical Thought Games. A sequel, geoDefense Swarm, was released on September 14, 2009, and was listed by Time magazine as one of the best games of the year. An Xbox Live enabled version was released for Windows Phone on June 8, 2011. As of the release of iPhone iOS 11, the game was removed from the App Store because of incompatibility.

== Gameplay ==
geoDefense follows the gameplay structure of typical tower defense games. Enemies (called Creeps) move towards the player's lives and towers must be placed around the map to appropriately prevent and destroy their progress. Gameplay takes place on a vector display-like field with a preset path leading from where the Creeps enter the field to the player's lives. Levels are in the form of these paths with varying limits on tower prices, enemy occurrences and lives.
