= Raph Koster =

American video game designer and entrepreneur

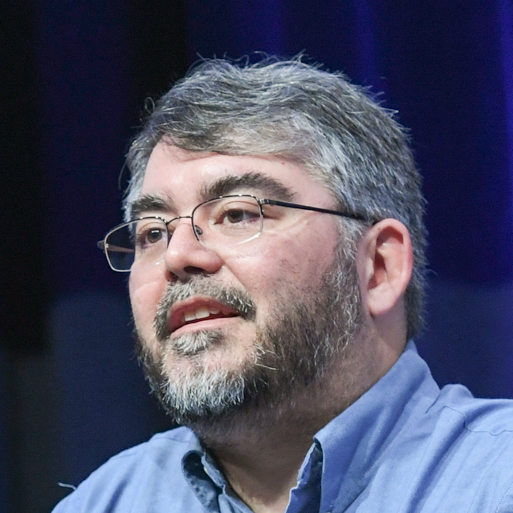
- Koster in 2017
- Born: Raphael Koster; September 7, 1971 (age 55); Long Island, New York, U.S.
- Occupation: Game designer
- Spouse: Kristen Koster (m. 1992)
- Children: Ben Koster; David Koster

Raphael "Raph" Koster (born September 7, 1971) is an American entrepreneur, game designer, and author of A Theory of Fun for Game Design. Koster is widely recognized for his work as the lead designer of Ultima Online and the creative director behind Star Wars Galaxies. From 2006 until 2013 he worked as the founder and president of Metaplace (previously operating as Areae and acquired by social gaming company Playdom in 2010, which was in turn acquired by Disney) producing a Facebook game platform.

== Biography ==
Koster attended Washington College in Chestertown, Maryland, receiving a bachelor's degree in English (creative writing) and Spanish in 1992. The same year he became involved with MUDs as a developer of Worlds of Carnage, then in 1994 moved on to become implementor of LegendMUD, where he was known as Ptah. He also played MUME for a time. On May 10, 1992, he married Kristen who would later work alongside him at Origin Systems as a game designer.

In 1995, he received a Master of Fine Arts in Poetry from the University of Alabama in Tuscaloosa, Alabama, and joined Origin Systems as the lead designer of Ultima Online. Koster was also the lead designer of Ultima Online: The Second Age, Ultima Online Live, and an unannounced and cancelled title until 2000, when he joined Verant Interactive in Austin as the creative director of Star Wars Galaxies.

Promoted to chief creative officer in 2003, he relocated to Sony Online Entertainment in San Diego where he spent three years primarily responsible for business development. In March 2006, Koster left the company to work on Metaplace which, at the end, was a social gaming platform for Facebook games. Since 2013 he is an independent designer and consultant.

Koster is a charter member of the Academy of Interactive Arts and Sciences, and a member of the IGDA, ASCAP, and Omicron Delta Kappa. He is also a frequent speaker at game industry conferences such as the GDC, DICE, State of Play, and E3. He presently lives in San Diego, California with his wife and family.

In 2019, Koster and Eric Goldberg founded a new company, Playable Worlds, focused on producing the MMORPG, Stars Reach.

== Credits ==
=== Games ===
- LegendMUD (emeritus implementor, 1994)
- Ultima Online (lead designer; Origin Systems 1997)
  - Ultima Online: The Second Age (lead designer; Origin Systems 1998)
- Star Wars Galaxies: An Empire Divided (creative director; Verant Interactive 2003)
  - Star Wars Galaxies: Jump to Lightspeed (chief creative officer; Sony Online Entertainment 2004)
  - Star Wars Galaxies: Episode III Rage of the Wookiees (chief creative officer; Sony Online Entertainment 2005)
  - Star Wars Galaxies: Trials of Obi-Wan (chief creative officer; Sony Online Entertainment 2005)
- EverQuest II (chief creative officer; Sony Online Entertainment 2004)
  - EverQuest II: Desert of Flames (chief creative officer; Sony Online Entertainment 2005)
  - EverQuest II: Kingdom of Sky (chief creative officer; Sony Online Entertainment 2006)
- Champions: Return to Arms (chief creative officer; Sony Online Entertainment 2005)
- Untold Legends: Brotherhood of the Blade (chief creative officer and editor; Sony Online Entertainment 2005)
- GripShift (chief creative officer; Sony Online Entertainment 2005)
- Frantix (chief creative officer; Sony Online Entertainment 2005)
- Field Commander (chief creative officer; Sony Online Entertainment 2006)

=== Discography ===
- After the Flood (1999)

=== Writing ===
- A Theory of Fun for Game Design — Foreword by Will Wright (ISBN 1-932111-97-2)
- "Declaring the Rights of Avatars"
- A Story About A Tree, (May 1998), revolving around the Karyn incident
- "The Laws of Online World Design" (GDC 1999 presentation)
- Koster, Raph. "Geek Fun Isn't Frivolous; Alien Swarms of Thundering, Flashing Games Hit Town This Week. They're Here to Make Us Smarter." Los Angeles Times May 15, 2005, sec. M1.
- "As Seen In Modern Lair" (October 2007)

== Awards ==
- Hot 100 (Next Generation 2006)
- 100 Greatest Developers (Game Informer 2006)
