= Areae =

American technology corporation

Metaplace, Inc.
- Company type: Subsidiary
- Industry: Video Games
- Founded: San Diego, California, U.S. (2006)
- Headquarters: San Diego
- Key people: Raph Koster, John Donham
- Products: Metaplace
- Parent: Playdom
- Website: www.metaplace.com

The word 'areae' is also the Latin plural of 'area'.

Areae is an American computer technology corporation based in San Diego, California, that was established in July 2006 by Raph Koster. Areae has been officially changed to Metaplace, Inc. to avoid confusion. Funded by Charles River Ventures and Crescendo Ventures, Areae develops the Metaplace software platform that democratizes the development of virtual worlds.

== History ==
In January 2010, the company pivoted towards using its virtual worlds platform to build social games on Facebook. It released two successful games on Facebook using its platform, Island Life and My Vineyard, after which the company was acquired by Playdom.
