= Andrew Kirmse =

American computer programmer

- Education: Massachusetts Institute of Technology
- Occupations: Video game developer (former); Mobile software
- Known for: Creator of Meridian 59; Creator of Google Now
- Title: Distinguished engineer

Andrew Kirmse is an American computer programmer. He was a co-creator of Meridian 59, the first 3D massively-multiplayer online game. While an engineer at Google, he co-created Google Now, a predictive search engine.

== Early life ==
Kirmse attended Thomas Jefferson High School for Science and Technology.

== Video games ==
Kirmse and his brother Chris developed the code for Meridian 59 in their parents' basement while they were in college. Meridian was the first online game to include 3D graphics. After a beta period, it was published by The 3DO Company in 1996, where it ran until 2000. Meridian's code was open-sourced in 2012, and it continues to run for free today.

While at LucasArts, Kirmse served as graphics programmer on the PlayStation 2 game Star Wars: Starfighter.

Kirmse contributed to the first four volumes of the Game Programming Gems series of books about video game development. He was the editor of Game Programming Gems 4.

== Google ==
Kirmse began working at Google in 2003, where he managed the Google Earth team. He later started and led Google Now, which was named Innovation of the Year by Popular Science in 2012, and won the Grand Prize at the 2013 User Experience Awards. He gave an invited talk on Google Now at the 2014 WWW Conference.
