= CyberStrike 2 =

1998 video game

- Developer: Simutronics
- Publisher: 989 Studios
- Series: CyberStrike
- Platform: Windows
- Release: NA: November 17, 1998
- Genre: Mech simulation
- Modes: Single-player, multiplayer

Cyberstrike 2 is a mech simulation video game developed by Simutronics and published by 989 Studios for Microsoft Windows. It is the sequel to CyberStrike.

== Development ==
The game was in development as early as July 1997.It was originally scheduled to release on January 15, 1998.

== Reception ==
Reception

Review scores
Publication	Score
CNET Gamecenter	7/10
Computer Games Strategy Plus	2/5
Computer Gaming World	3/5
GamePro	4.5/5
GameRevolution	C+
GameSpot	7.5/10
IGN	6.9/10
PC Accelerator	6/10
PC Gamer (US)	60%
PC PowerPlay	83%

The game received average reviews from critics.

CyberStrike 2 was named as a finalist by the Academy of Interactive Arts & Sciences for "Online Action/Strategy Game of the Year" at the 2nd Annual Interactive Achievement Awards, which ultimately went to Starsiege: Tribes.
