= Star Wars Galaxies =

2003 video game

- Developer: Sony Online Entertainment
- Publisher: LucasArts
- Director: Raph Koster
- Producer: John Donham
- Designer: Cinco Barnes
- Programmer: Jeff Grills
- Artist: Jake Rodgers
- Composer: Anna Karney
- Series: Star Wars
- Platform: Windows
- Release: NA: June 26, 2003; EU: November 7, 2003; AU: November 15, 2006
- Genre: Massively multiplayer online role-playing
- Mode: Multiplayer

Star Wars Galaxies was a Star Wars–themed massively multiplayer online role-playing game (MMORPG) for Microsoft Windows, developed by Sony Online Entertainment (SOE) and published by LucasArts. Set across several planets throughout the Star Wars universe, The game was released in stores on June 26, 2003, and spawned several expansions and updates through 2005.

The servers shut down on December 15, 2011 due to contract expiration. There are several private emulator projects in various stages of development that intend to allow users to experience Galaxies in different incarnations of the game's existence.

== Gameplay ==
=== Races and character creation ===
The ten species that were available to players included: Human, Twi'lek, Zabrak, Wookiee, Trandoshan, Rodian, Mon Calamari, Bothan, Sullustan and Ithorian.

Players could hire Entertainers to change their appearance in-game, with even more options than those available at creation. Many visual aspects of a character were changeable after character creation except species and gender.

=== Professions ===
At launch, players had access to 34 professions, with six basic professions: Artisan, Brawler, Entertainer, Marksman, Medic, and Scout. There were a total of 24 advanced professions.

Each profession had advanced tier options, including hybrids that combined traits of two professions. Each profession consisted of a tree-like structure of skills, with a single Novice level, four independent branches with four levels, and a Master level which required completion of all four branches. Characters purchased these skills with experience points gained through a related activity.

After the New Game Enhancement update in November 2005, the developers reduced the number of professions to nine: Jedi (available for the first time as a selection at character creation), Bounty Hunter, Smuggler, Commando, Spy, Officer, Medic, Entertainer, and Trader. Progress in these professions was divided into three separate experience source groups: combat, crafting, and entertaining. In addition to these professions, a character could also pursue three optional side professions: Pilot, Chronicler, and Politician.

=== Combat ===
On the game's release, each character and creature possessed three "pools" (called Health, Action, and Mind; or "HAM") that represented their physical and mental reserves. When any one of those pools was fully depleted, the character would faint. Combat required the player to carefully manage his or her actions to avoid depleting a pool.

With the New Game Enhancement update, ground combat was changed to real-time and similar to a first-person shooter. The player would aim a targeting reticule and left-click the mouse to fire. Auto-aim and auto-fire features were available, but players who eschewed those options were rewarded with an increased chance of maximum damage. As characters' levels increased, they gained access to additional combat abilities called "specials" which were activated by the right mouse button or by accessing the ability on a toolbar. In addition to providing high-damage attacks, specials were also used to heal, buff, debuff, and crowd control enemies. Players gained the ability to use more powerful weapons as they advanced in level. Players also earned "Expertise Points" as they leveled up, which were used to advance their professions. The player could allot 45 points to various abilities and attributes, from weapons specialties to healing and armor proficiency. Once a character reached level 90, they would gain access to collaborative "Heroic" missions. The five heroic missions were: Tusken Invasion, IG88, Axkva Min, Imperial Star Destroyer, and Exar Kun.

=== Spacecraft ===
The Jump to Lightspeed expansion added space combat and allowed players to own and pilot spaceships. Ships ranged in size from fighter crafts to larger gunships with up to three decks.

=== In-game economy, infrastructure, and politics ===
Characters could erect, own, and decorate a variety of communal, personal, and governmental buildings. These buildings, when grouped, could be organized into cities. Players held elections via ballot box for Mayor. Elected mayors granted city members permission to place structures within the city. Elections were held every three weeks. If another player wished to run for mayor, they would add their name to the ballot box to run against the incumbent. As cities grew in population, they became eligible to add services and facilities such as vehicle repair garages, shuttle ports, cloning facilities, hospitals, cantinas, and garden displays. They could show up on planet maps alongside canonical cities such as Theed and Mos Eisley.

The gameplay design aimed towards realistic social institutions like a dynamic virtual economy and other real-life social phenomena like a complicated division of labor. In this virtual economy, players were responsible for creating many in-game items including blasters, starships, clothing, armor, food, housing, furniture and even a wide variety of droids. According to Star Wars Galaxies and the Division of Labor, the division of labor in Star Wars Galaxies produced in-game results similar to those in real life.

== Setting ==
Star Wars Galaxies was set between the events of A New Hope and The Empire Strikes Back. The game launched with 10 planets: Tatooine, Naboo, Corellia, Talus, Rori, Dantooine, Lok, Yavin 4, the Forest Moon of Endor, and Dathomir. Later paid expansions added the planets of Kashyyyk and Mustafar. There were 12 space zones, added primarily during the release of the Jump to Lightspeed expansion. Nine space zones were associated with one or more of the playable planets, and three, Kessel, Ord Mantell, and Deep Space, were solely used for space gameplay and player-versus-player combat, with no land equivalent. The planet Hoth was added in November 2008, but could only be explored during an instance depicting the events of the Battle of Echo Base from The Empire Strikes Back.

Players could also meet many characters from the main and expanded universe of Star Wars, including Luke Skywalker, Han Solo, Princess Leia Organa, Darth Vader, and Chewbacca, among others.

== Development ==
=== Prerelease ===
The game was announced in 2000, when LucasArts Entertainment began a partnership with EverQuest creators Verant Interactive and Sony Online Entertainment to create a massively multiplayer Star Wars online role-playing game. The announcement included an expected release date of 2001 and that the game would take place during the original trilogy era. According to Raph Koster, director of the game during its early development, Star Wars Galaxies had a budget of $10-$12 million.

On May 17, 2001, the first expansion's development was announced, which would include gameplay in outer space. In the same press release, the release date of the base game was delayed to the second half of 2002. Rich Vogel, director of development at Sony Online Entertainment Austin, said that delaying the space expansion's release until after the base game's would give players time to establish their characters and understand ground gameplay. A new official website was also released on the same day. It included screenshots, movies, an updated frequently-asked questions section, concept art, development team member's profiles, features about the game, and a forum. The site reached 100,001 users by December 2001. Throughout the next year, new content would be posted on the website. This content included information on species and locations, new images and movies of game elements, and 360-degree QuickTime VR panoramas of different in-game locations.

The closed beta test began in July 2002. SOE continued to share information about the game on the website as the beta progressed. LucasArts also stated in 2002 that both the Xbox and PlayStation 2 would get a version of the game; however, both versions were cancelled.

On December 20, 2002, LucasArts announced an April 15, 2003 release date for the game, and that the base game of Galaxies would be called An Empire Divided. LucasArts also announced that the game's online community had grown to over 400,000 users since its inception in November 2000. At the time, this represented one of the largest ever fan communities amassed for any game prior to retail availability.

Galaxies' release was delayed for one final time on March 14, 2003, announcing that the game would not release on April 15 as previously planned. The eventual release date of June 26, 2003, was announced by LucasArts on June 17.

=== Release and continued development ===
The base game, titled Star Wars Galaxies: An Empire Divided, was released in North America on June 26, 2003, and in Europe on November 7, 2003. A localized version for the Japanese market was published by EA Japan and released on December 23, 2004.

In November 2005, SOE announced that the Japanese servers would shut down, and offered players the option of a refund or to transfer their account to a European or American server. The game's lack of success in Japan was attributed to cultural differences, as well as its futuristic setting being less popular than in the west.

The game was released in Australia on November 15, 2006.

==== Jedi ====
Jedi presented a challenge for the gameplay of Galaxies. During the in-universe period where the game was set, between A New Hope and The Empire Strikes Back, Jedi were canonically extremely rare and hunted down by the Empire. However, Jedi needed to be attainable to the players in order to achieve commercial success and fulfill the fantasy of players. Raph Koster, lead designer of Galaxies during its pre-release and immediate post-release development, said that there were two design choices for the team; either to make Jedi not more powerful than other player classes, or make them more powerful, but with a gameplay tradeoff. Koster initially asked to move the setting of the game to sometime after Return of the Jedi, when Luke Skywalker had set up his new Jedi Temple, but the time period of the game had been set by the licensing contract between SOE and LucasArts, and his request was denied.

During pre-release development, a separate Jedi slot was designed to unlock for each player upon completion of a list of tasks across a variety of gameplay experiences available in the game. This was designed to reward players who dabbled in every system available, and not only reward those who exclusively focused on combat, socialization, or exploring. Each player would have a unique list of these achievements, and the list would remain hidden to players. Once these tasks were achieved, a separate Jedi character slot on a player's account would unlock, allowing them to create a new, force-sensitive character. Originally, this new Jedi character would be subject to permadeath, a concept inspired by Diablo's hardcore mode, but this was removed at the request of SOE before release.

The initial set of player experiences proved too technically challenging given Galaxy's crunched development. Two months before the game's launch, Koster approved a plan to replace the checklist with a randomized number of the game's professions.

The decision to shift to profession proved to be a mistake, according to Koster. Players were highly unlikely to become a jack-of-all-trades with professions, which was required to unlock a Jedi slot. When asked by the game's marketing department when the first Jedi would appear in order to boost sales before Christmas, Koster estimated a decade. This was unacceptable to SOE, and the developers began offering hints. Players quickly shared among each other the hints, and the gameplay experience of abandoning their previous professions to chase a Jedi slot proved negative to player satisfaction, per Koster.

=== Expansions ===
==== Jump to Lightspeed ====
This first expansion, Jump to Lightspeed, was released on October 27, 2004. The expansion added space combat to the game. Reviews for Jump to Lightspeed praised the new space combat but criticized the repetitive, grinding gameplay.

==== Rage of the Wookiees ====
The second expansion, Episode III Rage of the Wookiees, was announced on March 9, 2005, and released on May 5 of the same year. It added the Wookiee planet of Kashyyyk and its corresponding space sector. Kashyyyk is different from the previous 10 planets: rather than being 16 square kilometers of openly navigable area, it is divided into a small central area with several instanced "dungeon" areas. Other content added in this expansion included: the ability to add cybernetic limbs to a character, resource mining in space, quests for two new creature mounts, and three new starships. A substantial portion of the content for this expansion was adapted from the film Star Wars: Episode III – Revenge of the Sith which was released in the U.S. on May 19, 2005, two weeks after the expansion release.

Reviews for Rage of the Wookiees lauded the new quest content for current subscribers, but lamented the combat gameplay updates and the continued bugginess of the game.

==== Trials of Obi-Wan ====
The third expansion, Star Wars Galaxies: Trials of Obi-Wan, was announced on August 19, 2005, and released on November 1, 2005. This expansion added the ground planet of Mustafar to the game. Like the previous expansion, the content is related to Revenge of the Sith, which was released on DVD the same day the expansion was released. Additional content, including the presence of the droid HK-47, is based on the Knights of the Old Republic games.

A week after its release, the character development process was revamped through the New Game Enhancements (NGE). This led to a number of players demanding their money back for the expansion. After a week or two of protests, Sony offered refunds to anyone who asked for it, but many players left the game.

Star Wars Galaxies after the Combat Upgrade

Star Wars Galaxies after the NGE

=== Server closures ===
On September 15, 2009, SOE announced the forthcoming closure of 12 servers. Character creation on these servers was disabled on the same day, with the final closure of the servers on October 15. Players with characters on the affected servers were offered free character transfer to one of the 13 remaining servers.

=== Hacking incident ===
On May 3, 2011, SOE issued a press release stating that all SOE accounts had been temporarily isolated from the Internet due to massive, widespread security infiltrations of various games, servers, and databases. Security teams (and the FBI) were called. Initial reports indicated that personal data of 20-30 million customers outside of the United States from 2007 had potentially been compromised. On May 14, 2011, SOE declared data was safe and reopened all servers. SOE offered a free 30-day membership for established members, an in-game decoration, and a 1:1 ratio of days lost.

=== Closure ===
On June 24, 2011, SOE and LucasArts announced that they had mutually agreed to shut down Galaxies on December 15, 2011. According to the SOE announcement, "If you are an active subscriber in good standing as of September 15, 2011, then you can play for free for the final months. Players wishing to play through the end of the game and participate in the galaxy-ending event planned for the last week of live service in December will need to re-activate or join the game on or before September 15. No new or reactivated accounts will be accepted after September 15, 2011."

On December 15, 2011, at 9:01 PM Pacific time, the servers of Star Wars Galaxies shut down, disconnecting those still playing and preventing entry into the game. The final five hours were broadcast in a live stream by Giant Bomb, with Kotaku reporting events as they happened. The final in-game events included a final player versus player finale between the Galactic Empire and The Rebels, as well as an appearance from the Force Ghost of Obi-Wan Kenobi as depicted in The Empire Strikes Back and Return of the Jedi.

== Reception and subscriptions ==
Reception

Aggregate scores
Aggregator	Score
GameRankings	75%
Metacritic	71/100

In the United States, Star Wars Galaxies: An Empire Divided had sold 370,000 copies ($16.1 million) by August 2006. It was the country's 43rd best-selling computer game between January 2000 and August 2006. Combined sales of all Star Wars Galaxies-related games released between January 2000 and August 2006 had reached 720,000 units in the United States.

Reviews for the initial launch of the game were mostly positive. The game was praised for its graphics, use of the movie soundtracks, massive world size, character customization, creative creature ecology, complex skill system, player economy interdependencies, and its sandbox approach. Reviewers criticized the overwhelming complexity of the game, combat imbalances of the professions, bugginess, and lack of quest content.

The first player to unlock a 'Jedi slot' did so on November 7, 2003, four months after the release of the game. Players criticized SOE for the substantial time commitment to unlock a Jedi, penalties for in-game death of a Jedi character (permanent character death after three in-game deaths), and monotonous game play required to acquire the Jedi. Developers responded by changing the penalty for death to skill loss in January 2004 and creating a quest system to unlock the character.

Media outlets criticized the changes of the "Combat Upgrade" while subscription cancellations rose. After the New Game Enhancements were implemented in November 2005, various media outlets criticized the reduced depth and complexity of the game. John Smedley, president of Sony Online Entertainment, defended the decision claiming it necessary to revamp the game in order to reverse the deterioration they were seeing in the subscriber base. SOE offered refunds on the Trials of Obi-Wan expansion due to it being released two days before the New Game Enhancement was announced.

Subscriber numbers were originally expected to exceed 1,000,000. In August 2005, SOE reported that they had sold 1,000,000 boxed copies of the game. In early 2006, unconfirmed reports showed that only 10,363 subscribers were playing on a particular Friday night, but Smedley denied that subscriptions had fallen this low.

In an online interview with Reddit in July 2012, John Smedley admitted to "stupid decisions" regarding Galaxies' combat upgrade and new gaming enhancement policies. He acknowledged player led emulator projects seeking to restore a free-to-play Galaxies circa April 2005, Publish 14.1, pre-Combat Upgrade, such as the SWGEmu project or Project SWG.

== Related media ==
=== Novelization ===
Star Wars Galaxies: The Ruins of Dantooine is a novel based in part on places and events in the game. It was authored by Voronica Whitney-Robinson and Haden Blackman, the LucasArts producer of the game. It was released in December 2003.

=== Trading Card Game ===
On August 27, 2008, following the success of SOE's Legends of Norrath, LucasArts and SOE released Champions of the Force, an online trading card game based on Galaxies. The game featured both a single-player story-based mode, as well as cooperative and competitive multiplayer. It was accessible within Galaxies itself.

== Legacy ==
=== Emulation ===
In 2004, the SWGEmu project was founded with the intention of re-creating the Pre-Combat Upgrade version of Galaxies from scratch through emulation. The goal of SWGEmu is to emulate the game to its entirety as it was on the live servers through patch 14.1. In 2020, the SWGEmu project announced it was near completion of the base game (colloquially referred to as version 1.0). They also announced that Jump to Lightspeed may no longer be included in version 1.0 due to the complexities of implementing the system. SWGEmu is an open source project distributed under the GNU Affero General Public License. The server code base, known as Core3, has been open source since before 2010, allowing for volunteers to easily contribute to its development. In 2019, SWGEmu also open sourced its engine, known as Engine3. Because SWGEmu is open source, any members are able to easily launch their own server for their own community. There are several community-run servers which develop content beyond the 14.1 publish goal of SWGEmu, such as Awakening, Dark Rebellion, Empire in Flames, Infinity, Reckoning. and Shadow of Mandalore.

In 2011, after SOE announced the intention of shutting down Galaxies, Project SWG was founded to emulate the NGE version of Star Wars Galaxies. As of 2026, Project SWG now focuses on emulating the CU version of the game.

Both SWGEmu and Project SWG are regarded as the primary emulation projects for Galaxies with other communities utilizing their source code to run their own server, sometimes contributing specific code to create their own content or by using shared content from resources such as ModTheGalaxy, a game modification distribution forum. Some player-made tools created while Galaxies was live, such as SWGCraft and GalaxyHarvester, and are running with connections to hosted servers.

=== Source code leak ===
In 2013, a former SOE employee leaked a copy of the 2010 production release source code for the Galaxies client, server, 3rd party libraries, and development tools to a few former players involved with the NGE Galaxies emulator Project SWG. The code was later leaked beyond its intended recipients and made available online.
