= Star Wars Galaxies: Jump to Lightspeed =

- Developer: Sony Online Entertainment
- Publisher: LucasArts
- Platform: Windows
- Release: NA: October 27, 2004; UK: November 5, 2004
- Genre: Massively multiplayer online role-playing
- Mode: Multiplayer

Star Wars Galaxies: Jump to Lightspeed was the first expansion to the massively multiplayer online role-playing game Star Wars Galaxies released on October 27, 2004. The expansion added space-based content to the basic, "ground-based" game, along with the option to create characters of the Sullustan and Ithorian species. Characters are allowed to choose one of three piloting professions, each one based on the character's Galactic Civil War faction—Rebel, Imperial, or Freelance, leading them to be either opposed to or allied with Grand Inquisitor Ja'ce Yiaso. This profession is separate from the character's ground profession, although earning experience points in space will also give the character experience points toward a ground combat profession. Customers who pre-ordered the expansion received a limited-edition Flash Speeder as an untradeable player mount.

This expansion was later made free to subscribers. It is either installed with the base game in new installations or downloaded as a patch for those who purchased the base game before the Starter Kit was released.

== Playable areas ==
The playable areas for space content include twelve space sectors: Tatooine, Karthakk (containing Lok), Naboo (containing both Naboo and its moon, Rori), Corellia (containing Corellia and Talus), Dantooine, Kashyyyk, Ord Mantell, Yavin, Endor, Dathomir, Kessel, and Deep Space. Each sector is a cube 16 kilometers on a side, and each contains at least one of the ten ground planets, except Kessel, Ord Mantell, and Deep Space, which are for high-level space gameplay only.

With the Rage of the Wookiees expansion it also released the Kashyyyk space sector. Ord Mantell was added in the Chapter 8 update, later on in the game's life.

== Space combat ==
Space combat in Galaxies is quite different than ground combat. Players must aim at their targets (often needing to "lead" their target in compensation for the target's movement) and click a button on the mouse or joystick to fire. Success in space combat is somewhat dependent on player skill. Grinding for ship upgrades is a significant factor in your success.

== Customization ==
As characters advance in their piloting professions, they gain access to a widening variety of tactics, starship chassis, and starship components. Their ships can be completely customized with components looted from enemies or crafted by shipwrights. Available chassis include the X-Wing and Y-Wing for Rebels, TIE Fighters and TIE Bombers for Imperials, and new Hutt and Black Sun ship designs for Freelancers. Characters who have mastered a piloting profession get access to PoB (Player on Board) ship designs such as the famed YT-1300. PoB ships allow characters to walk around the interiors (which can be decorated just like a building on the ground) and man additional shipboard stations such as laser turrets.

== Reception ==
Reception

Aggregate score
Aggregator	Score
GameRankings	77%

Review scores
Publication	Score
GameSpot	7.6/10
IGN	7.9/10

It was nominated for GameSpot's 2004 "Best Expansion Pack" award, which went to Rise of Nations: Thrones and Patriots. During the 8th Annual Interactive Achievement Awards, the Academy of Interactive Arts & Sciences nominated Jump to Lightspeed for "Massively Multiplayer/Persistent World Game of the Year", which was ultimately awarded to World of Warcraft.
