= HeroEngine =

Game engine

- Developer: Simutronics / Idea Fabrik / Laniatus LLC
- Stable release: 2.074 / January 19, 2024; 2 years ago
- Written in: C++, C#, HeroScript Language (HSL)
- Platform: Windows, macOS
- Type: Game engine, cloud game engine
- License: In-house proprietary
- Website: heroengine.com

HeroEngine is a 3D game engine and server technology platform originally developed by Simutronics Corporation specifically for building MMO-style games. At first developed for the company's own game Hero's Journey, the engine won multiple awards at tradeshows, and has since been licensed by other companies such as BioWare Austin (which used it for Star Wars: The Old Republic).

On 12 June 2010, Idea Fabrik announced that it had purchased the HeroEngine, as well as hired staff that was associated with its development and support.

== Features ==
The engine has online creation. For example, one developer can be creating a house and the entities inside, while another works on the landscaping and terrain around it. Each sees the other's work in real time.

The simulation and rendering processes of the engine are currently run on a single-thread. However, it is planned for there to be a multi-threaded release, but the publish date has not yet been determined.

Development times vary between games. Faxion Online took 18 months to complete, and Star Wars: The Old Republic took over five years.

=== Integration with other technologies ===
HeroBlade contains integrated features such as custom scripting and collaborative project management, which allow developers to make notes directly onto the in-game levels for others to see. These notes can be attached to tasks to signal other developers that something specific needs to be worked on. HeroEngine also works with technology from third-party vendors, such as FMOD, PhysX, SpeedTree, Wwise, Scaleform, and Vivox, as well as having plugins for 3D Studio Max and Maya.

== HeroCloud ==
HeroCloud was a version of HeroEngine that was available for $99 per year, under the license that they received 30% the money sales of any game made with it. It included everything that a license to the HeroEngine had, except for access to the source code.

== Awards ==
- Finalist for "Best Engine" from Game Developer magazine in 2006.

== Funding Issues ==
The company chairman of Idea Fabrik announced on 6 November 2015 that they were having funding issues related to an unnamed 3rd party, which could cause downtime on their HeroEngine and HeroCloud services. He stated that they were attempting to resolve and were "currently in negotiations to secure [their] funding for the present and the future."

== Games developed using HeroEngine ==
- Star Wars: The Old Republic (2011–present) - BioWare Austin(2011–2023), Broadsword Online Games (2023–present)
- The Elder Scrolls Online (used for development)
- Magic To Master (used for closed beta)
