= Tiny Heroes =

2011 video game

- App icon
- Developer: Simutronics
- Publisher: Simutronics
- Platform: iOS
- Release: September 8, 2011
- Genre: Tower defense

Tiny Heroes is a 2011 tower defense game developed by Simutronics and released on September 8, 2011, for iOS. It garnered a positive reception.

== Release ==
Tiny Heroes was released for iOS on September 8, 2011, and two free expansion packs named The Gauntlet and Carl's Crazy Funhouse 2 were added later that month.

== Reception ==
Reception

Aggregate score
Aggregator	Score
Metacritic	85/100

Review scores
Publication	Score
Pocket Gamer	3.5/5
TouchArcade	5/5

The game has a "generally favorable" Metacritic score of 85/100 based on 13 critic reviews.

Many critics gave positive reviews.
