= Ultima Online =

1997 video game

- Original cover art
- Developers: Origin Systems (1997–2004); Electronic Arts (2004–2006); Mythic Entertainment (2006–2014); Broadsword (2014–)
- Publisher: Electronic Arts
- Director: Starr Long
- Producer: Richard Garriott
- Designer: Raph Koster
- Programmers: Rick Delashmit; Scott Phillips
- Composers: Kirk Winterrowd; Joe Basquez; Hal Milton
- Platforms: Windows, Linux
- Release: September 24, 1997
- Genre: MMORPG
- Mode: Multiplayer

Ultima Online (UO) is a fantasy massively multiplayer online role-playing game (MMORPG) released on September 24, 1997 by Origin Systems.

Set in the Ultima universe, it is known for its extensive player versus player combat system. Since its release, it has added eight expansion packs, a booster pack, and dozens of free content updates. The release of Kingdom Reborn in 2007 brought a new game engine with upgraded visuals.

In preparation for the launch of the Stygian Abyss expansion, support for the existing client was discontinued to optimize the patching procedure. As a replacement, a revised rendition of the Kingdom Reborn client emerged, rebranded as the "Enhanced Client." This revamped version was unveiled as an open beta in July 2009, coinciding with the release of Stygian Abyss. The "Enhanced Client" is a blend of some of the 3D models and UI from Kingdom Reborn and the 2D art used in the Classic Client. The Enhanced Client and the Classic Client are the two official clients as of 2025.

== Gameplay ==
Ultima Online continued the tradition of previous Ultima games in many ways, but due to advancing technology and the simple fact that it was Origin's first persistent online game, many new game mechanics appeared. Since it was partially designed as a social and economic experiment, the game designers had to account for widespread player interaction as well as deal with the tradition of players feeling as if they were the center of attention, as had been the case in single-player games.

=== Worlds ===
Ultima Online began with a single world, with specific expansion packs adding additional territory and new worlds. The second world was the "Lost Lands", often referred to by players as T2A due to the expansion's name, "The Second Age", with additional land, dungeons, creatures, and terrain. The third was Trammel, which was a mirror of the original Ultima Online map. The release of Trammel led the developers to distinguish the original world by making the environment more grim and naming it "Felucca". The two kinds of servers were "normal" servers with both Trammel (consensual PVP) and Felucca (non-consensual PVP) ruleset and "siege" servers with non-consensual PVP and no item insurance. Siege servers support one character slot on an account, limits to ways of traveling and have other rules which generally make them more challenging than other servers.

The worlds in Ultima Online include:

- Felucca — The original world, which evolved to include dead trees and tombstones to distinguish. It has a harsher rule set where player killing is more common.
- Trammel — Supported a rule set that does not allow non-consensual PVP and includes additional open land for player housing.
- Ilshenar — Added dungeons and monsters and evolved to include new land, as well as more than 30 new creatures (designed by Todd McFarlane).
- Malas — Included a Player versus Player arena and space for 1500 new player homes. It featured Dungeon Doom, the largest dungeon at the time of its release, and two cities: Luna (the "City of Paladins") and Umbra (the "City of Necromancers"). Malas is a series of islands floating in a starry void and is distinguished by a darker artistic style. Malas was praised for its variety of creatures and geographic features.
- Tokuno — Group of islands based on Feudal Japan.
- Ter Mur — Land of the Gargoyles. The capital, Ter Mur, features space for player homes.
- Valley of Eodon — A primitive, prehistoric style land-mass with dinosaurs and giant apes.

== Development ==
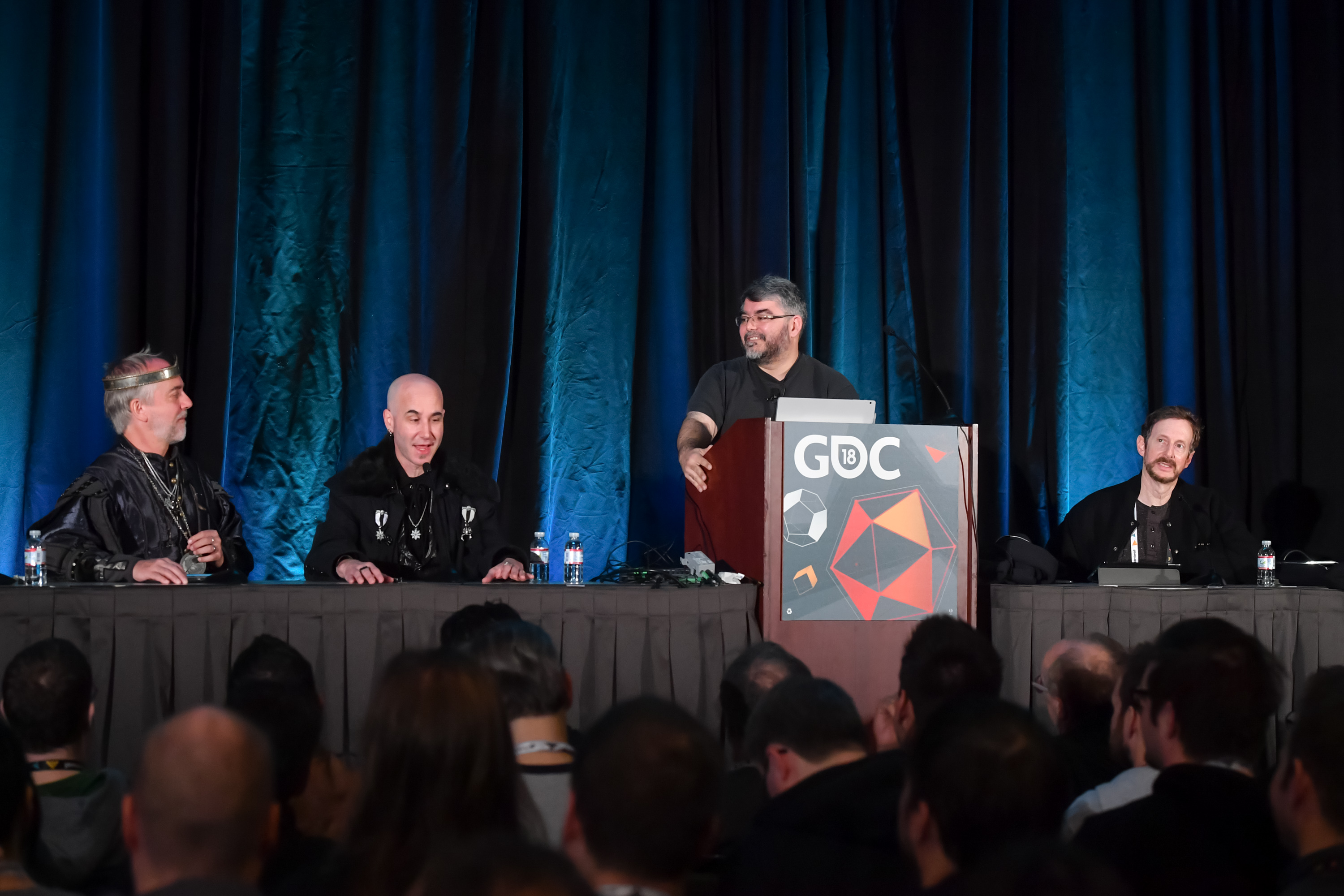
Garriott (left), Long, Koster, and Rich Vogel at the 2018 Game Developers Conference

The game had an initial development budget of $2.5 million. Ultima Online is the product of Richard Garriott's idea for a fantasy game involving several thousand people who can all play in a shared fantasy world. Prior games allowed hundreds of people to play at the same time, including Habitat (beta-tested in 1986), The Realm Online, Neverwinter Nights (the AOL version) and Meridian 59; however, Ultima Online significantly outdid these games, in both graphics and game mechanics. Garriott commented that "it was very important to us that Ultima Online be a game with a theme, and story, and quest - and then support larger, grander activity. We don't want it to be just player controlled and dominated; we want it to be an Ultima experience, with all the qualities that people expect from that. Ultima Online will be, I believe, the very first ever completely virtual world for the mass public to go live out alternate lives in." The goal was to offer the player as much freedom as possible.

The initial team was composed of Garriott, Starr Long, Rick Delashmit, Scott Phillips and, a bit later, Raph Koster, who became the lead designer. Koster wrote public "designer letters" and usually went by his nickname of Designer Dragon. Koster drew inspiration from prior online games, such as DartMUD.

The project started in 1995 and was presented to the public at E3 as "Ultima Online: Shattered Legacy" in May 1996. Origin claimed to have more than 3,000 participants in the preliminary alpha testing. The development cost was much greater than for previous, offline computer games; it relied on people accessing servers via modem. Ultima Online's initial features included persistent player housing, skill-based character progression (without levels or classes), a craft-based and player-driven economy, and unrestricted player-versus-player combat.

An artificial life engine was supposed to be implemented into the game. A preview announced that ecological events in the game would affect animal behavior, potentially creating new adventure possibilities in an organic manner. However, this feature never made it beyond the game's beta stage. Richard Garriott explained:

We thought it was fantastic. We'd spent an enormous amount of time and effort on it. But what happened was all the players went in and just killed everything; so fast that the game couldn't spawn them fast enough to make the simulation even begin. And so, this thing that we'd spent all this time on, literally no-one ever noticed – ever – and we eventually just ripped it out of the game, you know, with some sadness.

=== Beta and assassination of Lord British ===
Lord British was Garriott's in-game alter ego, who was killed during an in-game appearance at Ultima Online's beta test on August 9, 1997. During a server population stress test, a player character known as Rainz cast the "fire field" spell, killing Lord British. Producer Starr Long blamed it on human error: Lord British's character, like others, had been made invulnerable to this kind of attack, but by design, the invulnerability did not persist over several game sessions. When the server crashed shortly before the incident, Garriott forgot to reset his invulnerability status. Shortly after, administrators banned Rainz's account from the beta test for repeatedly exploiting, rather than reporting, bugs. According to Origin, he was not banned for the assassination but rather for prior complaints against his account highlighted by this incident. Beta testers protested Rainz's ban as well as subsequent actions of Long and other developers, during which his in-game character used a command to summon Deamons to indiscriminately kill other characters who observed the assassination. September 23, 1997 was the last day of the original beta test. The beta ended with a bang, as players were treated to an "end of the world" scenario with Shadowlords, demons, and other evil creatures slaughtering every character in sight.

=== Origin era (1995–2004) ===
In September 1997, Ultima Online launched and opened the first game servers to the public. Upon release, Ultima Online proved popular, reaching 100,000 paying subscribers within six months, causing severe lag problems. In 1999, servers opened around the world to support the rising popularity of the game, in Japan, Europe and South Korea. In 2000, Garriot resigned from Origin, taking Lord British with him. Game players created their own fanfiction speculations as to why the Lord had vanished. In February 2000, a large in-world event had a massive army of undead lay siege to the Britannia city of Trinsic. The event ran concurrently on all servers over several months. Another server opened in Australia during this time. In May 2000, Ultima Online's second expansion Ultima Online: Renaissance dramatically altered the game. It split the game world into two mirrored worlds called Trammel and Felucca. In Trammel all PVP was required to be consensual, while in Felucca players could be attacked by others players without consent. In November 2000, Ultima Online's first official fanfest was held, called the UO World Faire in Austin, TX. In March 2001, Ultima Online's third expansion Ultima Online: Third Dawn was released and introduced graphics which attempted to reproduce a three-dimensional effect. It added a new area to the server called Ilshenar which could only be accessed with a new game client that launched with the expansion. The original game client could be used in the previous server areas. In January 2002, Ultima Online's second official fanfest was called Online Worlds FanFest, also held in Austin. Players were able to meet the developers, as well as guest speaker Todd McFarlane. February saw the release of Ultima Online's fourth expansion Ultima Online: Lord Blackthorn's Revenge. Notably, it enabled access to the areas previously only available to the newer Third Dawn game client. In February 2003, Ultima Online's fifth expansion Ultima Online: Age of Shadows was released. It was the most game changing update yet including: offering players the ability to custom design their game homes, a server area that doubled the amount of player housing available, and overhauled the item system.

Ultima Online was the first MMORPG to reach the 100,000 subscriber base, far exceeding that of any game that went before it. Subscriber numbers peaked at around 250,000 in July 2003, but then began a steady decline. In February 2004, Origin Systems shut down. Ultima Online no longer had a named studio managing it. Development headquarters moved from Austin to Fairfax, Virginia.

=== Electronic Arts era (2004–2006) ===
The sixth expansion, Samurai Empire, launched in November 2004, was Japanese-themed. It offered two new professions, the Ninja and the Samurai, as well as new Japanese-themed housing tile sets. New lands, the Tokuno Islands, were added, with the cities being styled after ancient Japanese cities.

Expansion number seven, Mondain's Legacy, launched in August 2005. It featured the second player race, Elves. The quest system received a major upgrade, as did the crafting system. Spellweaving was added to the skills. Many new dungeons were added. This expansion was the first that was only available online (offline versions on CDs could be ordered). Mondain's Legacy was the last expansion for several years, with updates becoming more irregular after that point.

=== Mythic Entertainment era (2006–2014) ===
In June 2006 Electronic Arts purchased Mythic Entertainment, the creators of Dark Age of Camelot. Mythic was tasked with managing EA's MMORPG portfolio, including Ultima Online. That month it was also announced that the anti-cheating software PunkBuster would be integrated into Ultima Online. This marked the first time PunkBuster would be used with an MMORPG to help curb cheating and exploiting. However, it was never integrated into the game, and in November 2006, Electronic Arts put the PunkBuster integration on indefinite hold.

In 2008 the game had around 100,000 subscribers. As of April 2008, Ultima Online held a market share below 0.6% of the massively multiplayer online game subscriptions. This may in part be attributed to the 2004 release of World of Warcraft, which quickly established hegemony over the MMORPG market and has attracted scores of players from all preexisting games in the genre.

In August 2007 Ultima Online: Kingdom Reborn was released. This was the first major overhaul of the client and artwork systems since Ultima Online: Third Dawn. The final expansion was Stygian Abyss (2009), which focused on the gargoyle race. After Stygian Abyss the development model shifted from expansions to "booster packs" that were intended to be smaller updates released more frequently. However, the first booster pack High Seas of 2010 was also the last.

=== Broadsword era (2014–present) ===
It was announced on February 6, 2014, that development of the game would be transferred from Mythic to Broadsword, a new studio, that would take over future development.

==== Free-to-play model ====
In 2018 the traditional free fourteen-day trial was replaced with "Endless Journey" which allowed free playing indefinitely, but with large restrictions as to what players can do and where they can go.

==== Ultima Online: New Legacy ====
In 2020, Broadsword announced a new shard that would focus on returning Ultima Online to its fundamental roots as a roleplaying game. The shard is to have seasonal rulesets, whereby the shard will be reset via an in-game cataclysmic event and restarted with new rulesets in place. Broadsword stated that at the end of each season, characters will be able to transfer off of the Ultima Online: New Legacy shard onto a live shard with all skills, stats, and legacy progress that was earned.

The first season of New Legacy launched on October 15, 2024, with the second season launching on October 15, 2026.

== Reception ==
=== Reviews ===
Reception

Aggregate score
Aggregator	Score
Metacritic	59/100

Review score
Publication	Score
PC Gamer	55%

Next Generation reviewed the game, rating it four stars out of five, and stated that "it's a very big world in there, full of lots of exciting things to try and accomplish, with more to be added over time and lots of real people around to know you did them. Brittania is what you make of it. Have fun." GameSpot rated the game 4.9 of 10.

=== Sales and subscriptions ===
Internal sales predictions for Ultima Online were low, as Electronic Arts president John Riccitiello remarked that Ultima "was never a big franchise." According to an Origin Systems employee, the game's expected maximum subscriber count was 15,000 users. However, Stefan Janicki of GameSpot later noted that it "quickly became one of the most commercially successful games ever". CNNMoney similarly declared it a "watershed event" and the first major hit in the Internet-only game genre. In the United States, Ultima Online debuted at #9 on PC Data's computer game sales rankings for October 1997. It carried a list price of $65, and its average street price was $55 for the month. A writer for CNET Gamecenter found that the title was part of a trend of role-playing successes in October, alongside Fallout and Lands of Lore 2: Guardians of Destiny. He remarked, "If October's list is any indication, RPGs are back." Between Ultima Online's launch on September 25 and November 13, the game sold 65,000 units. In Japan, its initial shipment of 5,000 units sold out within 15 minutes on shelves.

Ultima Online's sales rate was the fastest ever for an Internet-only game by 1997, and it led Electronic Arts to declare the title its fastest-selling computer game of all time. A writer for PC Gamer US considered this speed the possible cause for "the many reports of lost orders, delayed pre-orders and stores out of stock that occurred when the game launched." In mid-November, Electronic Arts revealed plans to ship an additional 80,000 units of Ultima Online worldwide, including 15,000 for Japan. The majority of its first shipment had been targeted at the United States. On November 20, the game became Japan's best-selling computer title of its launch month. Ultima Online reached 70,000 global subscribers by early December, of which Japan made up 8,000 and Europe 5,000. The game had fallen from PC Data's monthly top 20 for the United States during November, but the firm tracked 87,000 sales of Ultima Online in that country alone through the end of 1997.

By December 1998, Ultima Online had reached 100,000 subscribers, with an average simultaneous player count of 12,500 and an average weekly playtime of 20 hours. Declaring the game a hit, IGN's staff wrote that its users "pay $9.95 a month to play the game. That's a million dollars in revenue a month. Twelve million dollars a year." The game had risen to 120,000 subscribers by March 1999, and by June Ultima Online's global sales had surpassed 200,000 units. A writer for GameDaily described this performance as "almost like printing money." Its subscriber base continued to climb in 2000, reaching 150,000 users by February. Domestically, Ultima Online and its Second Age add-on together had sold 249,610 copies and earned revenues of $11.3 million at retail alone by early 2000, according to PC Data. Gamecenter's Mark Asher wrote at the time, "Add in its current subscriber base of 150,000 players at $10 per month, and you can see the appeal of online, fee-based games." Subscribers rose to 165,000 by March, which amounted to $1.65 million in monthly revenue, and to 250,000 by October 2000.

By early 2001, Ultima Online's playerbase was estimated at 20–30% female, which was common to MMORPGs of the period. Japan remained a key market for Ultima Online by July 2001, and accounted for 64,000 of the game's 240,000 subscribers at the time. A representative for Electronic Arts reported, "While we do only a fraction of PC game business in Japan against EA's worldwide business, over 25 percent of Ultima Online business is done in Japan." Worldwide, Ultima Online retained 225,000 subscribers by early 2003.

=== Awards ===
Ultima Online was awarded "Online Game of the Year", as well as received a nomination for "Outstanding Achievement in Software Engineering", at the inaugural Interactive Achievement Awards (now known as the D.I.C.E. Awards), presented by the Academy of Interactive Arts & Sciences. Ultima Online's success resulted in Guinness World Records awarding the game eight world records in the Guinness World Records: Gamer's Edition 2008. These records include "First MMORPG to Reach 100,000 Players", "Longest Running MMORPG", and "First and Only Person to Kill Lord British", which was done by a player named Rainz during a server reset which turned off his invulnerability; however, the "Longest Running MMORPG" award was revoked due to an oversight and was instead given to the game Furcadia, which was released nine months prior to Ultima Online. In May 2001 Ultima Online won the MPOGD game of the month award In 2010, Ultima Online was the first inductee into the Game Developers Choice Online Awards Hall of Fame. In 2012, Stratics presented Ultima Online with a "Historic Achievement Award" to commemorate "fifteen years of innovation, imagination, and dedication in support of the Ultima Online community." Time designated it as one of the 100 greatest video games of all time in November 2012.

=== Controversies ===
Ultima Online had a number of serious bugs when it first shipped, with the vast majority of them being fixed with patches over the next few months. This ignited debates over whether the recently emerged technology for continuous patching would lead to companies routinely releasing games in an unfinished and/or bug-ridden state with the intention of fixing the problems after release.

Since the designers of Ultima Online wanted to provide freedom and sense of agency, it was important to allow players to act in a villainous role. The consequences of in-game criminality were adjusted over time, but maintaining the general commitment to player freedom. As explained by designer Raph Koster, "Being safe from evil is, in my mind, an uneven tradeoff for the fact that you don't get to be heroes anymore, in that you can just opt out of fighting evil. It may be nobody wants to be heroes except when it doesn't count, when it isn't challenging, that people would rather fight 'pretend evil' than the real thing, but I don't personally believe that. I still think people are better than that."

Ultima Online was sued by former player volunteers ("Counselors") and settled in 2004 without admitting wrongdoing. AOL had their volunteers train customer service personnel it hired, then shut down the volunteer program. Concern over future lawsuits led Microsoft to shut down their volunteer program for Asheron's Call.

== Expansions and follow-up releases ==
Throughout Ultima Online's history, there have been many major additions to the game. Expansion packs have been released regularly, all of which add new content in the form of landmass, art, quests, items, or game mechanics.

Title	Release date	Features
The Second Age	Oct 1, 1998	Lost Lands, along with an in-game chat system and new creatures. Also known as T2A. It was released in two boxed versions with different artwork and a single manual.
Renaissance	May 4, 2000	Doubled the size of the world, adding a mirror copy of the existing landscape. The worlds were called Felucca and Trammel, after the two moons in Ultima's Britannia world. The Trammel world did not allow player killing and was geared towards fighting monsters. Felucca adopted a darker, more foreboding look and kept its player vs player roots.
Third Dawn	Mar 7, 2001	Included a 3D client to compete with 3D competition like EverQuest. A special Third Dawn-only land was created, called Ilshenar. It was accessible only to 3D clients until the release of Lord Blackthorn's Revenge.
Lord Blackthorn's Revenge	February 24, 2002	Brought "a dark new world based on new characters from Todd McFarlane" to Ultima Online with improved game artificial intelligence, in-game help and improved character creation.
Age of Shadows	February 11, 2003	Brought the landmass of Malas with space for new housing, two new character classes (Paladin and Necromancer) and the ability to customize house designs. The item system was reworked with this expansion. Armor resistance was split into five types and many new properties that affected game play were added to weaponry. As good equipment became vital, this expansion also brought with it item insurance. Subscriptions reached a peak of over 250,000 accounts following the release.
Samurai Empire	November 2, 2004	Brought ancient Japanese mythology and folklore to the game, two new classes (Ninja and Samurai) and a new area to explore, the Tokuno Islands. The new class skills shifted the balance of player vs. player combat away from mage dominance.
Mondain's Legacy	August 30, 2005	Introduced a new race, elves, and a new skill, spellweaving. Several dungeons were also added.
Stygian Abyss	September 8, 2009	Featured a new playable race, the Gargoyle; additional play areas; and three new skills: imbuing, throwing and mysticism. Stygian Abyss also featured significant upgrades to the Kingdom Reborn client, which has been renamed to the Enhanced Client. The original client is still supported.
High Seas	October 12, 2010	Focused on additions to fishing, sailing and the pirate skill. Four new ship types, improved ship movement, pirate NPCs to hunt, and new boss encounters are introduced along with improvements to the fishing skill like new types of fish and crustaceans to catch and an increased skill cap.
Time of Legends	October 8, 2015	New Areas: Shadowguard and Valley of Eodon; two new champion spawns; completing the virtue system; many new items; new skill-masteries; updates to classic housing.

=== Clients ===
Electronic Arts provides the standard clients with which players are allowed to connect to the Ultima Online servers, though some third-party clients were made.

The 3D client was originally released as a part of the Ultima Online: Third Dawn expansion, but received poor reviews due to performance issues (especially memory leaks early on) and sub-par graphics. An update to the 3D client was made on January 30, 2006, when characters and creatures from the game were scaled down to smaller sizes. As of early May/Late April 2007, the Third Dawn client was no longer supported by Electronic Arts, and focus shifted to the Kingdom Reborn client and its successor the Enhanced Client. Electronic Arts Ultima Online servers do not allow the Third Dawn client to connect.

Screenshot from Ultima Online: Kingdom Reborn

Ultima Online: Kingdom Reborn was announced in August 2006 and was released August 27, 2007. A series of clues provided by developers via an in-game event arc allowed players to find a URL on the Ultima Online website wherein a simple message was contained as well as a Flash movie featuring screenshots of the upgraded graphics. In addition to the upgraded graphics, there was a newer, more streamlined interface. Some of the changes included hot keys, a scrolling bag configuration and a new character sheet. The new client modernized the game's look, making it easy to add new content without backsliding through outdated and outmoded art, while maintaining the niche market as an MMORPG that can run on lower-end computers. Electronic Arts referred to the Ultima Online: Kingdom Reborn client as "2.5d," meaning that it was written in 3d and then moved into 2d to make it easier for lower-end computers to run. The client is available as a free download.

Electronic Arts originally stated that the Ultima Online: Kingdom Reborn client would replace the long-standing Ultima Online client. As of September 2009, the Kingdom Reborn client has been superseded by a modified version of the KR client, now called the "Enhanced Client". The Kingdom Reborn client no longer works on official shards. The new "Enhanced Client" keeps the rendering engine (including particle effects and light source rendering) from Kingdom Reborn, but not the KR graphics. Support for this client ended to streamline the patch process prior to the release of the Ultima Online: Stygian Abyss expansion.

A modified version of the Kingdom Reborn client, renamed as the "Enhanced Client", was introduced as part of the Stygian Abyss expansion. It was released as an open beta in July 2009. Changes included enhanced macro abilities, a more configurable interface, changes to the mapping system, and graphical improvements. The enhanced graphics of the Kingdom Reborn client had been retired in favor of lower resolution original graphics that more closely resembled the original 2D client. This graphic set was based on the Third Dawn client and was previously available in the Kingdom Reborn client as optional original graphics.

=== Other releases ===
Ultima Online has had several special releases that were not expansions or booster packs, but came with boxed or in-game extras.

- Ultima Online: Charter Edition (September 30, 1997) was available to pre-order from Origin Systems at the launch of Ultima Online and in small quantities alongside the standard retail box. It included a signed lithograph of the Ultima Online artwork by the Hilderbrandt brothers and a pewter pin badge bearing the Ultima Online logo. The box was not signed by Richard Garriott, but simply bears a digital print of his Lord British signature. The Charter Edition included the cloth map that was also a feature of the standard box, and included three months of subscription time, as opposed to the single month included with the standard box.
- Ultima Online: Discovery Edition (February 1, 2000) was released to the Australian and New Zealand markets at the same time as the launch of the Oceania server for the region.
- Ultima Online: 7th Anniversary (September 25, 2004) was a special release of the game to celebrate Ultima Online's seventh birthday. It included a more recently patched CD. This release was contained in a small cardboard box containing a triple-CD jewel case, featuring Ultima Online: Age of Shadows, but also included Ultima IX: Ascension install and play discs as a bonus. A glossy booklet showing the history of Ultima Online expansions was included that contained historic art and an interview from the Ultima Online team and community leaders. It included a code for an in-game gift, one of which was Ultima Online's famous Hilderbrant print, an extra character slot (a total of six characters was now available) and 7 buddy registration codes.
- Ultima Online: Gold (July 18, 2005) was sold by Wal-Mart and includes the same content as Ultima Online: Samurai Empire. This edition came with an Advanced Character token code and quick-start manual.
- Ultima Online: The Eighth Age (September 25, 2005) was a boxed game CD with an array of in-game tokens. The release was to celebrate Ultima Online's eighth birthday. The box included a patched game CD, a glossy booklet featuring an atlas of Sosaria, in-game tokens for an anniversary gift (choice of 8), a character transfer, an advanced character, a 45-day free trial code and a time-limited blue soul stone.
- Ultima Online: 9th Anniversary Collection (October 31, 2006). Formerly known as "Eve of a New Age." This came with an in-game upgrade code that redeemed 9 "Heritage Tokens", "Crystal" and "Shadow" items which matched new housing tile sets in the game, and attendants, which took the form of NPCs. These could be set to announce a player's presence in a house or to follow the player around on the map. The Heritage tokens could be redeemed for several kinds of items including special armor, weapons, and house decoration items in various themes (3 fruit trees, a set of rugs, tables, a broken furniture set, a "dark" or evil furniture set and more).

== Legacy ==
=== Sequels ===
Two sequels were planned by Electronic Arts, but both were canceled during development so that more focus could be spent on the original.

- Ultima Online 2, later renamed Ultima Worlds Online: Origin was announced in 1999. It was to add steampunk elements to the fantasy setting, set in a world where the past, present and future of Sosaria were merged by a mistake made by Lord British while attempting to merge the shards of the Gem of Immortality. Todd McFarlane was hired to design original monsters and regions for the game, as well as help shape the story. It was cancelled in 2001 before its release, citing the competitive nature of the massively multiplayer online gaming market—Electronic Arts feared the sequel would harm Ultima Online's subscription numbers. Some of the monsters and art made for the game were later used in the Ultima Online expansion Lord Blackthorn's Revenge.
- Ultima X: Odyssey was a new MMORPG to be set in a world named Alucinor, created by the Avatar after the events of Ultima IX: Ascension. It was cancelled in 2004 when Electronic Arts closed Origin. The Odyssey team was invited to move to the Bay area to finish the game. However, only a small number of people accepted the transfer. In the end, Odyssey was cancelled because the development team dissolved.

=== Community ===
During the game's May 1996 alpha testing, there already formed over a dozen player-created guilds.

Shadowclan is a guild that gained notoriety within the online gaming community in 1997 by taking the place of non-player character orcs in Ultima Online. Former clan administrator Ogur was interviewed about Shadowclan in Massively Multiplayer Games For Dummies. A reference to Shadowclan was written into the official Dark Age of Camelot documentation.

Fans of Ultima Online reverse-engineered the game to produce server emulators of the original Electronic Arts servers.

In early 1999, a few users began auctioning their accounts, one garnering a winning bid of $2025 (equivalent to $3,914 in 2025).
