= GemStone IV =

- Developer: Simutronics
- Publishers: GEnie, AOL, independent
- Platforms: Windows, Macintosh
- Release: 1988
- Genre: Fantasy MUD
- Mode: Multiplayer

GemStone IV is a multiplayer text-based online role-playing video game (often known as a MUD) produced by Simutronics. Players control characters in a high fantasy game world named "Elanthia". The first playable version of the game was known as GemStone ][ and was launched in April 1988 on GEnie. It was one of the first MMORPGs and is one of the longest running online games still active. Access to the game is subscription-based (monthly fee) through its website, with three additional subscriptions levels available, "Premium", "Platinum" and "Shattered", in addition to a free-to-play model introduced in early March 2015.

== Technical information ==
The Wizard Front End for GemStone IV.

GemStone IV is a text-based game built on Simutronics' proprietary engine, the IFE (Interactive Fiction Engine). This engine is capable of changing nearly any aspect of the game on the fly which allows updates without the necessity for downtime. Due to the use of the IFE, GemStone is rarely taken offline, giving a 24-hour uptime cycle aside from the occasional game crash.

The GemStone interface is simply a text stream, and the game can be played with a Telnet interface after authentication. There are several official interfaces to the game, as well as several unofficial ones. The oldest interface for Windows is called the "Wizard Front End" and offers several useful features such as status readouts, macros, and limited scripting abilities. The Wizard has since been superseded with the "StormFront" Front End introduced in 2003, which itself has been rebranded as "Wrayth" in 2022. Wrayth offers several additional extensions to the game, including a "point and click" interface that allows one to click on text within the game and bring up action menus applicable to that portion of text. The Java FE and a browser-based version named "eScape" are less popular alternatives. A Wizard (similar to the Windows version) also exists for Macintosh Classic, while a Front End named "Avalon" is available for Mac OS X. No official Linux client exists.

== History ==
GemStone was first demonstrated to GEnie in 1987 before Simutronics was officially incorporated. It was only used as a demonstration model and was never available to the general subscribers. GemStone ][ was released in April 1988 to GEnie customers. However, GemStone ][ was very short-lived, and GemStone III went into open beta testing in December 1989, officially launching on February 1, 1990. The transition from "][" to "III" maintained significant portions of the environment, but not all, and character records were not maintained over the transition, requiring all players to begin anew. GemStone III evolved into GemStone IV in November 2003, but the game world and character records were maintained over the transition. GemStone III was promoted on GEnie by promising players the opportunity to receive real-life versions of gems found in-game, something that persisted for many years.

GemStone originally operated with a license to use the Rolemaster game mechanics and Shadow World environment from Iron Crown Enterprises (ICE). In 1995, Simutronics and ICE agreed to let the business relationship expire, necessitating the removal of all ICE intellectual property from GemStone. Many of the game changes were simply renaming ICE names, such as changing the world name from Kulthea to Elanthia, and renaming the deities while keeping their previous characteristics.

Game mechanics were greatly changed with the de-ICEing (as the period is colloquially named), which required every game character to undergo significant changes. Character racial and class choices were also changed, making any direct translation between the two systems difficult. The end result was that every character was required to "re-roll" their character with the option to change race and skills, but maintaining their old experience level, class, and equipment.

GemStone became available on AOL in September, 1995, just after the de-ICEing process. It had already become available on CompuServe and Prodigy before that. When AOL switched to flat-rate pricing, GemStone did over 1.4 million customer-hours in a single month and was attracting 2,000-2,500 simultaneous players. Simutronics launched a web portal in 1997, and started phasing customers off of the online services and onto the web interface, although it would take several years before the last of the online service portals were closed.

== Reception ==
Computer Gaming World in 1991 stated that Gemstone III was a good example of the best and worst aspects of online play. The reviewer liked the game's community aspect and well-written prose, but criticized the poor parser, "surprisingly empty" game environment and—given the per-minute charge—lack of a free tutorial, and concluded that "the present incarnation of on-line games doesn't quite work for him". In a follow-up 1993 review, the reviewer wrote that his sojourn in Kulthea was a rewarding experience. He reported receiving help from both built-in commands and other characters and the ability and opportunity for his bard character to sing. The reviewer concluded that "at last, I know why" the game was so popular. In 1997 Next Generation named it as number seven on their "Top 10 Online Game Picks". At its peak (1996), GemStone III had over 2,000 simultaneous users and 1 million play hours per month, large numbers for its era.

In 2020 and 2021, GemStone III inspired retrospectives by Elizabeth Landau in Wired and Gizmodo. She noted its ability to facilitate human communication and its similar nature to later MMORPGs and social media.

- 1998 Finalist, "Online Game of the Year", Academy of Interactive Arts and Sciences
- December 1996, AOL Members' Choice Award

== GemStone IV - Shattered ==
In May 2010, GemStone IV - Shattered was released by Simutronics. It allows unrestricted player-vs-player combat and has no policy against automated play.
