= Ultima Online: The Second Age =

- Developer: Origin Systems
- Publisher: Electronic Arts
- Designer: Raph Koster
- Platform: Windows
- Release: NA: October 29, 1998; EU: June 25, 1999
- Genre: Massively multiplayer online role-playing
- Mode: Multiplayer

Ultima Online: The Second Age was the first expansion for the Ultima Online MMORPG. The expansion added several features to the game, including a new region called the Lost Lands, new creatures, and support for player-built cities.

The Second Age was developed by Origin Systems and published by Electronic Arts in 1998. It was the last Ultima Online expansion designed by Raph Koster.

== Added content ==
The Second Age expansion introduced many new gameplay features, creatures, monsters, and areas to Ultima Online.

=== Lost Lands ===
The Lost Lands are a continental landmass added to the playable area of the game that featured two cities, Papua and Delucia, and one dungeon, Terathan Keep. In Ultima lore, these lands were discovered or activated as the result of geological activity caused by the casting of the "Armageddon" spell by the Followers of Armageddon (or Zog Cabal). There are 11 entrances the Lost Lands, all of which can be accessed by either boat, foot/mount, or teleportation.

==== Papua ====
Papua, nicknamed "Swamp City" is the smaller of the two towns introduced in T2A and is located on the northeastern edge of the central landmass of the Lost Lands. It can be easily accessed by saying "recdu" while standing on a certain pentagram in the city of Moonglow. Conversely, one may stand on the pentagram in Papua and say "recsu" to be teleported back to Moonglow. Papua has a dock for ships, making the town accessible by water as well. The city is composed of grass huts and features several interactive NPC's: an alchemist, baker, blacksmith, butcher, carpenter, healer, jeweler, provisioner, shipwright, stablemaster, tailor and tinker all reside in the town. The styling of the town and the surrounding marshlands mimick the look of real-world Papua New Guinea.

==== Delucia ====
Delucia is the larger of the two towns introduced in T2A and is located in the southwestern corner of the Lost Lands and may sometimes be called the "City of Ruins." Cotton fields, minable mountainsides, harvestable lettuce and turnip fields, a bank, a mage shop, a healer, and a provisioner can all be found in the town.

=== Mobs ===
The Second Age expansion added various new creatures and monsters (also known as mobs) that are unique to the Lost Lands and are meant to fit the lore surrounding the areas in which they can be found.

==== Creatures ====
- Bullfrog
- Frost Spider
- Giant Ice Serpent
- Giant Toad
- Ice Snake
- Lava Lizard
- Nightmare
- Forest Ostard
- Destert Ostard
- Frenzied Ostard

==== Monsters ====
- Cyclopian Warrior
- Frost Troll
- Ice Elemental
- Ice Fiend
- Imp
- Mummy
- Ophidian Apprentice Mage
- Ophidian Avenger
- Ophidian Enforcer
- Ophidian Justicar
- Ophidian Knight-Errant
- Ophidian Matriarch
- Ophidian Shaman
- Ophidian Warrior
- Ophidian Zealot
- Snow Elemental
- Stone Gargoyle
- Stone Harpy
- Swamp Tentacle
- Terathan Avenger
- Terathan Drone
- Terathan Matriarch
- Terathan Warrior
- Titan
- Wyvern

== SYSTRAN Integration ==
Ultima Online: The Second Age was the first game to integrate SYSTRAN's real-time language machine translation software to break down the communication barrier of the game's international players. SYSTRAN has inconsistent statements about when the license agreement was signed, ranging from late 1995 to late 1998 possibly due to online documentation errors. The languages which were licensed for translation were English, Japanese and German. Ultima Online executive producer Jeff Anderson said "We're extremely pleased to have the SYSTRAN system in Ultima Online: The Second Age" and that "The Ultima Online community spans the globe with UO players in each of the world's time zones. With the help of the SYSTRAN translator, we can start reaching beyond language barriers and bring that community even closer together."

In some of the game's promotional material, the marketing states potentially in reference to their approach: "A Global Game - Ultima Online makes the world your playground with features specifically designed to bring players together from different countries."

== Reception ==
Reception

Aggregate score
Aggregator	Score
GameRankings	76%

Next Generation reviewed the PC version of the game, rating it five stars out of five, and stated that "If you're a fantasy role-player, an online chatter, an Ultima, or a previous player who logged out in the Dark Times and never returned, it's time to pack your bags for Britannia. The Second Age is an Avatar's dream come true."

Although critical reaction to the game was mixed, The Second Age was awarded "Online Role-Playing Game of the Year" at the 2nd Annual Interactive Achievement Awards. Many reviews criticized The Second Age for not expanding the game enough, especially since gamers were anticipating the 3D MMORPGs EverQuest and Asheron's Call.
