= Simutronics =

American online games company

Simutronics Corp.
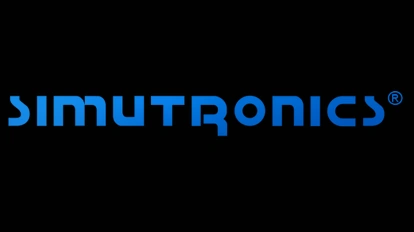
- Type: Private
- Industry: Video games
- Founded: 1987; 39 years ago, in St. Louis, Missouri, U.S.
- Headquarters: St. Louis, Missouri, U.S.
- Owner: Stillfront Group (55.06%)
- Number of employees: 30
- Website: www.play.net

Simutronics Corp. is an American online games company whose products include GemStone IV and DragonRealms. It was founded in 1987 by David Whatley, with husband and wife Tom & Susan Zelinski. The company is located in St. Louis, Missouri. It became part of the Stillfront Group in 2016.

The company's flagship product is the text based game, GemStone IV, which went live in November 2003, with predecessor games running back in 1988. GemStone was originally accessed through General Electric's internet service provider GEnie, later becoming accessible through AOL, Prodigy, and CompuServe before Simutronics finally moved all their games to their own domain in 1997.

== Simutronics products ==
=== Multiplayer online games ===
- GemStone IV, Simutronics' flagship product, a text-based multiplayer fantasy game, which has seen over one million users over the years. It is the longest-lived commercial MUD game, followed by Avalon: The Legend Lives.
- DragonRealms, a 1996 MUD set in GemStone's Elanthia world, with popularity on online services AOL, Compuserve, and Prodigy. In comparison with GemStone, DragonRealms's has more skill-based gameplay.
- CyberStrike, also known as CyberStrike Classic, a graphical futuristic ship combat game. It won the first ever "Online Game of the Year" award from Computer Gaming World magazine in 1993.

=== Mobile games ===
- Tiny Heroes, a tower defense game for iPhone and iPad, released in 2011
- One Epic Knight, an endless runner game, released in 2012 for iOS devices and in 2013 for Android
- Lara Croft: Relic Run, a spin-off sequel to the Lara Croft sub-series in the Tomb Raider franchise and a mission-based runner released on iOS and Android in 2015.
- Siege: Titan Wars, a 3D real-time PvP game that launched on iOS and Android in 2017.
- Siege: World War II, a wartime sequel to Siege: Titan Wars, launched on iOS and Android in 2018.

=== Former games ===
- Modus Operandi, a MUD set on a fictional Caribbean island, originally designed to encourage mystery-based roleplay, which closed on November 2, 2015.
- Alliance of Heroes, formerly Hercules & Xena: Alliance of Heroes, this adventure-based MUD was set in the universe of the TV shows Hercules: The Legendary Journeys & Xena: Warrior Princess. In later years the game changed its license, and removed specific Hercules & Xena trademarks, and ran as a retooled "tongue in cheek" mythology MUD until its closure on November 2, 2015.
- Orb Wars, (no longer available) an early graphical game involving team combat between wizards
- GemStone ][ (no longer available), an early commercial text-based multiplayer fantasy game
- GemStone III (morphed into GemStone IV), a text-based multiplayer game which was originally based on the Rolemaster rules from Iron Crown Enterprises
- CyberStrike 2, a sequel to CyberStrike, released in 1998

== HeroEngine ==
HeroEngine is a 3D game engine and server technology platform developed specifically for building MMO-style games, based around a system similar to the IFE using the Hero Script Language (HSL). Originally developed for the company's own game Hero's Journey - vaporware which never made it to the testing stage - the engine has since been licensed by other companies. Simutronics sold the HeroEngine to Idea Fabrik, Plc. on August 5, 2010.
