= Kobold (Dungeons & Dragons) =

Fictional species in Dungeons & Dragons

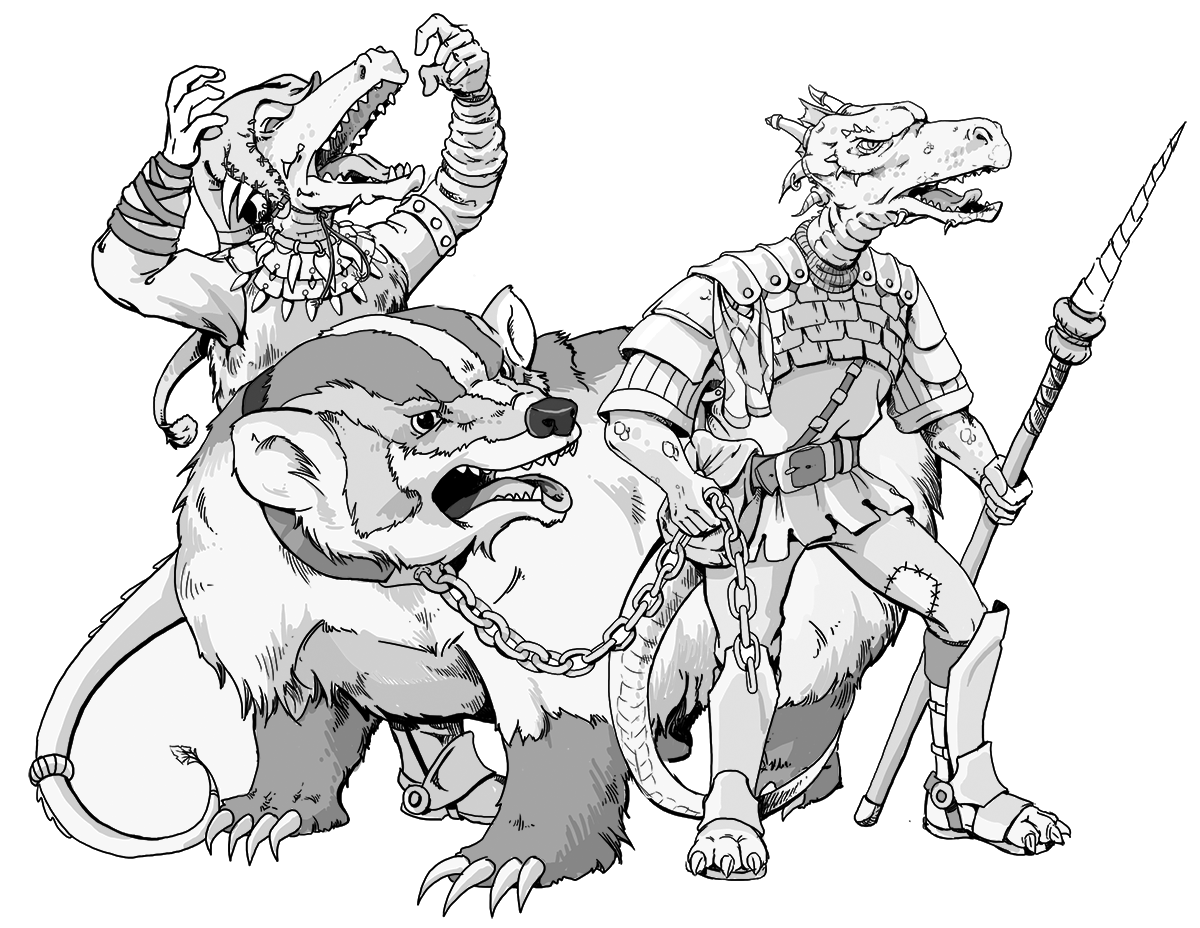
- An illustration of two kobolds with a badger, showing their diminutive size
- First appearance: Dungeons & Dragon (1974)
- Based on: Kobold and Dragon

In-universe information
- Type: Small Dragon
- Alignment: Usually Neutral

Kobolds are a fictional race of humanoid creatures featured in the Dungeons & Dragons roleplaying game and other fantasy media. They are often depicted as small reptilian humanoids with long tails, distantly related to dragons.

In fantasy roleplaying games, kobolds are often used as weak "cannon fodder" monsters, similar to goblins, but they may be cunning and strong in groups.

== Publication and depiction history ==
Kobolds appeared as monsters alongside goblins, orcs, and trolls in the 1971 wargame Chainmail, as part of Gary Gygax's "fantasy supplement" inspired by The Hobbit and other fantasy novels. This supplement inspired the first editions of Dungeons & Dragons (1974), where kobolds appear again. These early appearances depict kobolds only as creatures similar to goblins.

Kobolds also featured as opponents in the first playtest run by Gary Gygax for the original D&D rules in 1972.

Kobolds were first described as hairless humanoids with small horns by Gygax in the Monster Manual (1977) for Advanced Dungeons & Dragons (AD&D), which also describes them as aggressive, tribal creatures living in dark forests or subterranean settings. They appeared in the video game Pool of Radiance (1988), with their depiction directly derived from that book.

In 1987, Roger E. Moore published the editorial "Tucker's kobolds" in the magazine Dragon, describing a game scenario where a horde of well-prepared kobolds uses guerrilla tactics to significantly challenge a more powerful party of adventurers. This editorial became popular among roleplaying fans, and helped kobolds gain traction. The AD&D 2nd Edition Monstrous Manual (1993) introduced Urds, a race similar to kobolds with batlike wings. Kobolds were made available as a player character race in The Complete Book of Humanoids (1993).

Later editions of the game emphasized more draconic aspects, and suggest that kobolds are biologically related to dragons, and view them as an object of worship and servitude. In the 3rd edition, the original kobolds were replaced henceforth by the new draconic ones.

A notable kobold character in media adaptations of Dungeons & Dragons is Deekin Scalesinger, an aspiring bard introduced in Shadows of Undrentide expansion pack for the role-playing video game Neverwinter Nights developed by BioWare. Deekin is originally a follower of the white dragon Tymofarrar, who orders Deekin's kin to travel to a small village called Hilltop located in the Silver Marches and attack a dwarven wizard named Drogan Droganson. Deekin meets and helps the protagonist of Shadows of Undrentide, an apprentice of Drogan, and later persuades the adventurer to take him along as a traveling companion. Deekin returns as a henchman in the second Neverwinter Nights expansion pack, Hordes of the Underdark, where he is depicted as growing in power and stature, even manifesting dragon-like abilities and features as a Dragon Disciple. Deekin makes a cameo appearance in Neverwinter Nights II developed by Obsidian Entertainment.

== Reception ==
The best characters are really your friends that you play with, but this kobold bard is an exception. Most characters would annoy you if they talked in third person, but Deekin pulls it off. He's working on a book and often narrates what's going on around him, even fessing up to passing gas. Deekin refuses to partake in the typical kobold way of life; after all, who would want to be a generic monster?

— Kimberley Wallace, The Best BioWare Characters

Screen Rant compiled a list of the game's "10 Most Powerful (and 10 Weakest) Monsters, Ranked" in 2018, calling this one of the weakest, saying "When a dungeon master has run several low-level Dungeons & Dragons adventures, they will inevitably grow weary of using the same creatures from before and will want to shake things up. That's the moment when they prepare to paint over the serial numbers and replace the goblins with kobolds."

Kobolds have been described as "short subterranean lizard-men". The kobold was considered one of the "five main 'humanoid' races" in AD&D by Paul Karczag and Lawrence Schick, and a classic of D&D by reviewer Dan Wickline.

Journalist David M. Ewalt highlighted that kobolds have often been the first combat encounter for new players of Dungeons & Dragons, from its beginnings to the current 5th edition.

A.V. Club reviewer Nick Wanserski praised the "thoughtful" look on kobolds provided in Volo's Guide to Monsters: While "such staples as orcs, goblins, and kobolds [...] often get lumped together as a dull monolith", the many details here give "a lot of personality to an otherwise easily forgettable monster."

Kimberley Wallace of Game Informer considered the kobold character Deekin Scalesinger, a NPC companion introduced in the Neverwinter Nights expansion Shadows of Undrentide, among BioWare's best characters.
