= Aribeth =

Character from Neverwinter Nights

- Neverwinter Nights character
- Aribeth as depicted in promotional artwork for the 2002 video game Neverwinter Nights.
- First appearance: Neverwinter Nights (2002)
- Voiced by: Wendee Lee

In-universe information
- Full name: Aribeth de Tylmarande
- Race: Half-elf
- Class: Paladin, later Blackguard
- Alignment: Lawful good (initially)
- Home: Neverwinter

Aribeth de Tylmarande, commonly known as Aribeth or Lady Aribeth, is a character in the Forgotten Realms setting of the Dungeons & Dragons role-playing game. She first appears in BioWare's 2002 role-playing video game Neverwinter Nights, where she is a paladin of the benevolent deity Tyr and one of the principal figures in the campaign. After initially directing the player character's efforts to contain a plague in the city state of Neverwinter, she becomes disillusioned with its leadership following the death of her partner, Fenthick Moss, and later turns against the city. Her fate depends in part on the player's earlier interactions with her. Aribeth returns in the 2003 expansion Neverwinter Nights: Hordes of the Underdark, and is featured in the tabletop supplement Minsc and Boo's Journal of Villainy.

Aribeth has been discussed by scholars and critics for the extent to which the story of Neverwinter Nights centers on her rather than its customizable protagonist, and for her progression from guide and ally to antagonist. She was also used prominently in the game's promotion before and after its release.

== Concept and creation ==
Aribeth was meant to be given a substantially larger role in the planned story outline for the official campaign by lead designer Rob Bartel. In the outline, Aribeth and Fenthick were jointly responsible for recovering the Waterdhavian creatures needed to cure the Wailing Death. When Fenthick refused to believe evidence of Desther's involvement in spreading the plague, Aribeth continued the investigation despite his objections. After Desther was exposed, Aribeth was to be compelled by her superiors to pronounce the final guilty judgment against Fenthick. His execution would prompt her to renounce Tyr and leave Neverwinter.

The later stages of Bartel's outline developed her fall from grace more extensively. The primary antagonists of the campaign, Maugrim and Morag, were to exploit Aribeth's grief and recruit her to their cause, after which she would command the Luskan forces marching on Neverwinter and eventually become their "General of Generals". Bartel also used her betrayal as part of the campaign's recurring question of where evil could be found, with Aribeth repeatedly confronting the players and challenging the moral authority of the city they were defending. The proposed campaign culminated in Luskan capturing Neverwinter and the players confronting Aribeth beneath Castle Never; the outline indicates that this confrontation would end with her death. This differs from the released game, in which earlier conversations with Aribeth can allow the player to persuade her to surrender.

== Appearances ==
=== Neverwinter Nights ===
In Neverwinter Nights, Aribeth is a paladin of Tyr serving Lord Nasher Alagondar in the city of Neverwinter. Following an outbreak of the Wailing Death, she directs the player character to recover four creatures whose components are needed to produce a cure. She works alongside Fenthick Moss, a cleric and her partner, and Desther, a priest whom Fenthick trusts. Desther is eventually exposed as having aided those responsible for the plague. Although Fenthick did not knowingly participate in the plot, he is executed for his role in bringing Desther into Neverwinter.

After Fenthick's death, Aribeth continues to aid the investigation into the forces threatening the city. Conversations with Aribeth would show her becoming increasingly troubled by his execution and by her own faith. She later joins Maugrim Korothir and the cult working against Neverwinter, and uses her knowledge of the city in their attack. The player eventually confronts her; depending on choices made in earlier conversations, Aribeth can be persuaded to surrender rather than being killed in battle.

In Hordes of the Underdark, Aribeth can be recruited as a party member during the later stages of the expansion. She is encountered encased in ice by the player character in Cania, where it is revealed that she has been deceased since the events of Neverwinter Night. After being freed, she initially fights the player character, but can be persuaded to abandon her hostility and seek forgiveness from Tyr.

=== In other media ===
Aribeth later appeared in the 2021 Dungeons & Dragons supplement Minsc and Boo's Journal of Villainy, which includes characters originating in several Forgotten Realms video games. Listed among the sourcebook's available henchmen, Aribeth is described in connection with her roles as both ally and antagonist in Neverwinter Nights.

== Promotion and reception ==
Aribeth was used in promotional material for Neverwinter Nights before the game was released. In June 2001, GameBanshee reported that artwork of the character had appeared on multiple magazine covers and on posters at E3. The same report noted that Neverwinter Vault had made a high-resolution Photoshop file of Aribeth available for download. Aribeth's image continued to be used in material associated with the game after release. RPGamer reported in November 2002 that a collector's edition of Neverwinter Nights included a 34-by-22-inch poster of "Lady Aribeth – Paladin of Tyr", together with an art book, soundtrack and other items. Her association with the game's promotional identity persisted in later commentary; in 2023, PC Gamer writer Ted Litchfield referred to Aribeth as the "NwN mascot".

Aribeth has received particular attention for the degree to which Neverwinter Nights gives her a defined character arc, while leaving the player character without a predetermined history. Hilde Corneliussen and Torill Elvira Mortensen argued that, despite the player's role as protagonist, the campaign's narrative focus falls on Aribeth. They contrasted her doubts, grief and eventual betrayal with the comparatively limited characterization of the game's optional companions, and described her as the game's most important non-player character. They also noted that her fate is one of the points at which earlier player choices can alter the outcome of the story, because she may be persuaded to surrender through dialogue rather than defeated in combat. Amy S. Kaufman similarly discussed Aribeth as an unusually prominent figure in the campaign. In "Romancing the Game: Magic, Writing, and the Feminine in Neverwinter Nights" published in Studies in Medievalism XVI: Medievalism in Technology Old and New, Kaufman noted that her characterization developed extensively over the course of the game and argued that the narrative gives greater attention to Aribeth's story than to that of the player character. She considered this emphasis as part of the game's wider treatment of women and gender.

Later retrospectives also singled out Aribeth as one of the campaign's lasting attractions. Mary Kenney of Kotaku cited Aribeth's betrayal among the developments that made the story worth replaying, while crediting the game's distinctive non-player characters more generally with making Neverwinter Nights her favourite game. Alice Bell, writing for Rock Paper Shotgun, similarly attributed her continued preference for the original Neverwinter Nights over its sequel largely to Aribeth, whom she regarded as one of her favourite game characters and praised for her story arc. In the third edition of Character Development and Storytelling for Games, Lee Sheldon used her as an example of how flaws in a non-player character can produce greater narrative depth. He described her progression from a heroic quest-giver and mentor to an enemy motivated by grief and revenge as an example of a reversal that adds surprise to a game narrative. Writing for the US edition of PC Gamer in 2023, Robert Jones cited Aribeth's motivations when discussing memorable role-playing game antagonists. Comparing her with Jon Irenicus from Baldur's Gate II: Shadows of Amn and Solas from Dragon Age: Inquisition, Jones argued that each works as an antagonist because the player can understand the events that led them into opposition with the protagonist. He wrote that this quality helped bring the story of Neverwinter Nights to life.

A 2006 feature in the Romanian edition of PC Games discussed Aribeth and Bastila Shan from Star Wars: Knights of the Old Republic within the context of romance, duty and temptation in role-playing games. The article examined Aribeth's attachment to Fenthick, her loss of confidence following his death and the player's ability to influence her final confrontation. In a PC Gamer feature on romances in PC games, Jones selected Aribeth and Fenthick's relationship for discussion. He regarded Fenthick's death and Aribeth's subsequent turn against Neverwinter as the elements that made their story memorable, emphasizing that her actions were presented as arising from grief and resentment rather than an unexplained change of allegiance.

Aribeth's appearance has also drawn comment for the contrast between her characterization as a formidable paladin and the impracticality of her armour. Bell described Aribeth's armor as essentially corset-like, noting its strapless and backless construction, pronounced neckline, and, in some character artwork, an asymmetrical ornamental shoulder guard. Bell further observed that the plunging neckline remained conspicuous in Aribeth's comparatively low-detail in-game character model. Corneliussen and Mortensen argued more broadly that female armour in Neverwinter Nights is more sexualized than its male equivalent, ranging from revealing outfits to full-body armour shaped to accentuate the breasts, and questioned its practicality as protection. Kaufman also discussed the visual representation of female warriors in Neverwinter Nights and echosed Corneliussen and Mortensen's criticism of armour designs that emphasize feminine body shapes, even when they cover most of the body.

Corneliussen and Mortensen observed that players created modules centered on Aribeth after the release of Neverwinter Nights, including Aribeth's Dilemma and Aribeth's Fate. They argued that this interest reflected the degree to which players could become invested in her story independently of their own customizable character.
