= Neverwinter Nights 2: Mysteries of Westgate =

- Mysteries of Westgate cover art
- Developer: Ossian Studios
- Publisher: Atari, Inc.
- Designer: Luke Scull
- Series: Neverwinter Nights
- Engine: Electron engine
- Platform: Microsoft Windows
- Release: April 29, 2009
- Genre: Role-playing
- Mode: Single-player

Neverwinter Nights 2: Mysteries of Westgate is an expansion pack for the role-playing video game Neverwinter Nights 2. It was developed by Ossian Studios and published by Atari, Inc. on April 29, 2009. The player creates a character and controls it, along with a group of three pre-designed companions, journeying through the game world. The gameplay is very similar to that of the base game. Mysteries of Westgate also includes new monsters, music, and other tools, which can be used by players to create their own Neverwinter Nights 2 levels.

The game takes place in the Forgotten Realms world, a Dungeons & Dragons campaign setting, in the area of Westgate. The player creates a character at the start of the game who finds a cursed mask belonging to the "Night Masks", a thieves' guild at war with two other organizations. The player chooses which of these other organizations to side with, and embarks on a quest to lift the mask's curse.

Mysteries of Westgate was made after Ossian Studios' successful work on the 2006 expansion pack Darkness over Daggerford. The game's release was delayed to April 2009, despite its completion in September 2007, because of digital rights management issues and coordination difficulties among the three companies involved. Mysteries of Westgate met with mixed reviews; the game's plot and small amount of spoken dialogue were criticized by reviewers, while its music and low price for overall content were praised.

== Gameplay ==
Mysteries of Westgate is a role-playing video game that is based on the fantasy role-playing game Dungeons & Dragons, and uses the d20 System rules, which are based on determining the results of most tasks, such as attacks, by performing the equivalent of rolling a 20-sided die. The player begins the game by either importing their character from Neverwinter Nights 2 or creating a new one that starts at character level 8. Each character has a race (such as human or elf) and a class (such as fighter or wizard), which determine the character's main abilities. Mysteries of Westgate has gameplay similar to the original Neverwinter Nights 2 and uses the same systems for gameplay elements, such as character levels, combat, and magic. The gameplay takes place primarily from an overhead perspective in a three-dimensional environment. The player moves and commands characters with the mouse.

The game's designers estimate that Mysteries of Westgate contains over 15 hours of gameplay, part of which is provided by pursuing optional side quests unrelated to the main plot. Mysteries of Westgate's campaign features content that does not appear in Neverwinter Nights 2 or its other expansions, including four new monsters (such as the wererat and sea serpent-like quelzarn), a set of "sewer" terrain tiles, and new music, all of which is available to players for use in the creation of custom levels. The pack includes over one hundred magic items, equipment which the character can use during the adventure.

== Plot ==
The storyline of Mysteries of Westgate is unrelated to Neverwinter Nights 2 or its other expansions. It begins with the player character (PC) finding a cursed mask in a dungeon, which causes the PC to have nightmares, and which cannot be discarded. The player soon discovers that the mask belongs to a group of thieves known as the Night Masks of Westgate. After traveling to Westgate, a port city along the Dragon Coast, the PC discovers that the Night Masks are involved in a guild war with a rival group of thieves known as the Ebon Claws. The temple of Lathander is also fighting the Night Masks, and the PC is faced with the choice of joining the temple or the Ebon Claws. The PC is joined by three companions near the start of the game: the rogue Rinara, a former Night Mask; Mantides, a fallen paladin; and Charissa, a cleric of Tyr. All three travel with the PC for most of the adventure.

The party then undertakes a number of quests, which vary depending on which faction the PC sides with. As the quests are completed, more is revealed about the cursed mask and how to get rid of it. The party eventually learns that the Night Masks are led by vampires, and additional clues lead them to the vampires' catacombs. After defeating the vampire Latasha, the PC travels through a portal to reach the chamber of the Night Masks' leader, Orbakh. Orbakh gives the PC the choice to either become a vampire or keep the cursed mask.

The game's ending depends on the PC's choice. If the PC chooses to become a vampire, former allies turn against the PC. Once they are defeated, Orbakh sends the PC to destroy the Ebon Claws. If the PC instead decides to keep the mask, Orbakh attacks; after his defeat, the leader of the Ebon Claws arrives with a group of followers and attacks the party. After the party is victorious, they kill the last of the Night Masks and free the player character from the cursed mask.

== Development ==
Soon after the release of Darkness over Daggerford, Ossian Studios' previous game, discussion began over the possibility of the company creating another expansion for Neverwinter Nights 2. Ossian officially proposed the game to Atari and Wizards of the Coast, the owners of the Dungeons & Dragons license, in the fall of 2006, with production beginning in January 2007. When asked about why the Dungeons & Dragons setting appealed to the company, Ossian Studios CEO Alan Miranda said, "All of our team members are [Dungeons and Dragons] fans, so developing a [Neverwinter Nights 2] game seemed like a great opportunity."

During the game's early development stages, it was set in the Forgotten Realms nation of Rashemen. The location was changed because Obsidian Studios' Neverwinter Nights 2: Mask of the Betrayer was to take place in the same area. At lead designer Luke Scull's suggestion, Westgate became the new setting for the game. Ossian wanted the game's setting to differentiate itself from both Neverwinter Nights and the Baldur's Gate series of games. They found Westgate, situated in another area of the Forgotten Realms setting, to be ideal. Miranda compared Westgate to a city-sized version of Star Wars's Mos Eisley cantina: a "melting pot" of creatures from everywhere in the setting. Ossian said they decided to make Mysteries of Westgate exclusively single-player in order to improve the game experience.

David John, who had also worked on expansion packs for the original Neverwinter Nights, composed the score for Mysteries of Westgate, which took several months. In an interview soon after the game's release, Scull said "Some of [the game's] tracks are so good, I actually listen to them alongside my usual eclectic mix." Mysteries of Westgate's voice acting was recorded in Edmonton, Alberta, Canada, with over 12,000 words of new voice-over material. The cast included some of the same people who previously acted in Neverwinter Nights: Hordes of the Underdark and other BioWare games. Brian Dunn and Brian Watson, both of whom had also worked on Darkness over Daggerford, created the game's artwork and graphics.

Development of Mysteries of Westgate ended in September 2007, but Atari delayed the pack's release, because the digital rights management they wanted to use was not ready. The delay was also caused by coordination problems among Ossian, Obsidian, and Atari. The game was officially announced on October 22, 2007, with an estimated release date of "fall 2007". In May 2008, IGN reported that the game was scheduled for release that June, but it was further delayed, finally being released on April 29, 2009. Development of Mysteries of Westgate continued during the delays, to ensure the game's compatibility with the expansions and patches for Neverwinter Nights 2 that were released after the game's completion. Scull said, "Kevin Smith, our Lead Technical Designer ... had to bug fix and create new builds of the game with each [patch and expansion]."

When IGN's Steve Butts asked Miranda why the game was made available only through download, he replied, "From a financial perspective, digital distribution makes a lot of sense. It allows us to sell the Adventure Pack at a lower price point while still providing players with the same high quality gameplay and content that they've come to expect from NWN2 products.". Some of the game's voice-overs, monsters, music, and objects were released to the Neverwinter Nights 2 community for free, for use in building custom adventures, without needing to purchase the game itself.

== Reception ==
Reception

Aggregate score
Aggregator	Score
Metacritic	73/100

Review scores
Publication	Score
1Up.com	B−
GameSpot	6.5/10
GamesRadar+	6/10
GameZone	6.9/10
IGN	7/10
GameStar	72/100

Reviews of Mysteries of Westgate were mixed. 1UP.com's Jason Wilson said that the game's plot is "an intriguing tale, and even after finishing the game, a number of encounters and plot points ring in my head ... but the story's poor stitching distracts from its arc—I felt like a great hand ... was pushing me through the plot, and the tale felt a bit muddled toward the end." Brett Todd of GameSpot called the plot "rough around the edges", while GameZone reviewer Michael Lafferty said, "The game may have a disjointed storyline, but there are moments where humor shines through, and the game does take a few interesting plot twists. And the exploration of the city zones, the underground areas where the trolls abound, hold that sense of joyful discovery that make an RPG worth playing." Numerous reviewers mentioned that the impact of the mask which drives the story is minimal, having little effect on the actual gameplay. Lafferty said the side quests were not necessarily optional, as they were often a source of additional gold, and a certain point in the game's plot required a substantial sum of it to proceed. GamesRadar's Rich McCormick praised the game's storyline and main quest as some of its best points. In a review for GameStar, Christian Schmidt thought that the game's appearance and humor were poor, but recommended it because of its strong storyline.

Todd found the pack's difficulty to be "wildly careening" and stated, "Some battles are amazingly easy. You can soar through many scraps in moments, with your party carving up the opposition before you can tell if you're fighting a mummy or a zombie. However, others are absolutely brutal ... There are more than a couple of moments in the game in which your party is ambushed by enemy spellcasters that rip you to pieces before you can even think about a proper response." He praised the game's music as blending in seamlessly with that of the original game, but criticized it for having a minimal amount of voice acting, with sequences of dialogue that begin with audio and transition into text. Steve Butts commented on this, saying, "the dialogue here really needs some work ... you'll even be treated to some truly tortured sentences. 'Wait till you see how deep into the backside of evil I insert my boot in the name of justice!' is probably my favorite. It's too bad there's not more voice acting in the game, because hearing someone speak lines like that out loud may have given the developers an opportunity to edit some of the worst offenders."

As a result of Mysteries of Westgate's 2007 completion and 2009 release, it did not feature the improvements present in the two previous Neverwinter Nights 2 expansion packs, and received criticism because of this. Todd stated that the game lacks the artistic improvements of Mask of the Betrayer and Storm of Zehir, a sentiment echoed by Lafferty's review. However, Butts stated that "Westgate delivers enough engaging content that the absence of all the latest improvements isn't "too agonizing." Several reviews noted that the fifteen hours of story and the new objects in the adventure pack make the expansion worth its US$9.99 cost.
