= Neverwinter Nights: Shadows of Undrentide =

- Windows cover art
- Developers: Floodgate Entertainment; BioWare (Note: Enhanced Edition developed by Beamdog.)
- Publisher: Atari (Note: Mac OS X port published by MacSoft. Enhanced Edition published by Skybound Games.)
- Director: Trent Oster
- Producer: Trent Oster
- Designer: Brent Knowles
- Writer: David Gaider
- Composer: Kemal Amarasingham
- Series: Neverwinter Nights
- Engine: Aurora
- Platforms: Windows: Linux; Mac OS X; Nintendo Switch; PlayStation 4; Xbox One
- Release: June 17, 2003: Microsoft Windows; NA: June 17, 2003; AU: June 27, 2003; UK: July 4, 2003; Linux; WW: June 23, 2003; Mac OS X; NA: August 11, 2004; Switch, PS4, Xbox One; WW: December 3, 2019
- Genre: Role-playing
- Modes: Single-player, multiplayer

Neverwinter Nights: Shadows of Undrentide is an expansion pack for the role-playing video game Neverwinter Nights developed by Floodgate Entertainment and BioWare, and was released in June 2003. The expansion pack adds a new campaign and new features including new character classes, creatures, feats, and spells, and other nuances such as allowing the player to access and modify their henchman's inventory. The Windows version also included scripting options for the Aurora toolkit.

== Gameplay ==
Shadows of Undrentide expands on the core Neverwinter Nights by adding additional content. There are five prestige classes: Arcane Archer, Assassin, Blackguard, Harper Scout, and Shadowdancer. The Arcane Archer can cast spells and use a bow with great skill. The Assassin can also cast spells and is able to paralyze enemies. The Blackguard is an evil version of a Paladin. The Harper Scout is similar to a Ranger with extra magical resistance. The Shadowdancer has enhanced stealth abilities. The expansion pack also includes thirty new quests, sixteen new creatures, and fifty new spells.

== Plot ==
=== Chapter one ===
The campaign takes place at the same time as the events of the original campaign. The protagonist is an apprentice of the dwarven adventurer Drogan Droganson in the small village of Hilltop located in the Silver Marches who is studying along with fellow apprentices Xanos, Dorna, and Mishca. The campaign begins with a kobold attack on the village and Drogan himself, leaving him poisoned and barely alive. During the attack, certain valuable artifacts are stolen from Drogan's laboratory.

Soon after the attack, Ayala, an elven Harper arrives and uses her magic to sustain Drogan. She then reveals that she and Drogan are members of the Harper order and that Drogan was assigned by the Harpers to guard four magical artifacts: the mummified hand of the dead lich Belpheron, the tooth of a dragon, a mask which once belonged to a high priest of the Lord of Shadows, and a statue of a tower that was found in a desert tomb. Being Drogan's favorite apprentice, the hero is placed in charge of recovering the artifacts.

As the search progresses, it is discovered that a mage named J'Nah desires to collect the artifacts on behalf of a mysterious hooded woman whom she serves. She had originally been in alliance with a dragon named Tymofarrar, who led the kobolds. She had her gnolls attack the kobolds, after they had left Hilltop, in order to try to take all of the artifacts for herself. Upon the collection of all four artifacts, it is discovered that the tower statue, which was believed to be the least powerful of the artifacts, actually contains a crystal of tremendous magical power. Drogan, who has by now recovered from the effects of the poison, requests that the hero visit an archeologist named Garrick who is investigating some Netherese ruins in the Anauroch Desert, believing that he may be able to identify the crystal.

=== Interlude ===
Upon Drogan's request, the hero sets out across Anauroch with a halfling caravan on the way to an encampment of Ao worshipers at which Garrick is located. Upon meeting up with Garrick and showing him the crystal, Garrick reveals that it is a mythallar, a crystal containing incredible magical energy akin to those that were used by the Netheril Empire to levitate their flying cities. He also mentions that he and a party of fellow archeologists were exploring some ruins to the north located in a certain Valley of the Winds when they were attacked by a mysterious hooded woman who led a horde of demonic creatures who was trying to open some kind of portal, The hero takes this woman to be the master of J'Nah. After entering these ruins, the protagonist sees this woman travel through a portal which disappears soon after. At this point, Drogan uses magic to teleport to the protagonist's side and aids them in reactivating the portal. After the portal is reactivated, it is discovered that the woman had placed some kind of trap on it which causes the ruins to begin to collapse when triggered. Drogan uses a magical shield to sustain the weight of the collapsing ruins long enough for the hero to enter the portal, but he himself is crushed soon afterwards.

After passing through the portal the hero emerges back in the desert and pursues the hooded woman to another area of ruins. Upon confronting her, she removes her hood, revealing herself to be a medusa and uses the medusas' petrifying gaze to turn them to stone. While in this state, she takes the mythallar from them, and speaking to them in this state, identifies herself as a powerful sorceress by the name of Heurodis, and claims to have sought the mythallar so that she could use its power to raise the ancient Nether flying city of Undrentide, the ruins of which she is located on, and use it to gain power over Faerûn.

=== Chapter two ===
The hero returns to normal form after Ashtara, a reptilian merchant and slaver who is searching the ruins of Undrentide for treasure, uses a magical potion to restore them. He afterwards clamps a magical collar around the hero's neck with which he can force them to do his bidding by sending electrical charges through the collar. Upon destroying the city's guardian golems who were hindering Astara's slaves in their search for treasure, Astara frees the hero, allowing them to search the ruins for Heurodis, who at this moment is in the process of completing a ritual which will restore Undrentide to the skies. It is discovered that she is atop a certain Tower of the Winds located in the center of the city and has used a magical force field to prevent anyone from entering the tower. By using three magical artifacts, the Wise Wind, the Dark Wind, and the Death Wind, known collectively as the Three Winds, the force field can be broken. The hero collects these artifacts, opening the force field, and climbing the tower, to find that Heurodis has already succeeded in raising the flying city. Heurodis, who is now a lich, has set up a circle of crystals through which the power of the mythallar flows in order to keep the city in the air. In the ensuing battle, one of the crystals is destroyed just as the mythallar's energy is passing through it, causing the energy to escape and the city to plummet. Knowing that as a lich Heurodis might be able to survive the fall, the hero kills her with his/her own hands, and afterwards uses a magical mirror which was found within Undrentide to escape to a plane of shadows and avoid impending death.

== Development and release ==
Fantasy author Naomi Novik contributed to the design and development of Shadows of Undrentide. The game was released for Windows in North America on June 17, 2003, and reached stores the following day. It was released in Australia and the Nordics on June 27, and in the United Kingdom on July 4. Sega released the game as its publisher in Japan on March 18, 2004. A Linux client for the game was made available on June 23, 2003. The game was released for Mac OS X on August 11, 2004, courtesy of publisher MacSoft. Developed by Beamdog and published by Skybound Entertainment, a remastered version of the base game featuring several modules including the Shadows of Undrentide expansion was released for Nintendo Switch, PlayStation 4, and Xbox One on December 3, 2019.

== Reception ==
Reception

Aggregate scores
Aggregator	Score
GameRankings	82%
Metacritic	78/100

Review scores
Publication	Score
GameSpot	7.8/10
GameSpy	4/5
Daily Record	3/5

Shadows of Undrentide received mainly positive reviews. GameSpot referred to it as "not the most memorable RPG with BioWare's name on it, but it's got plenty of good, new content to satisfy most any Neverwinter Nights fan", and praised it for the quality of its campaign. According to GameSpy, it "focused on some of the major weaknesses in the original game, providing a much better single-player experience while adding a whole bunch of new goodies and tools to the adventure building tools". Bob Low of the Daily Record said the expansion pack, despite adding new features, lacked innovation. Chris Chan of the New Straits Times liked the game, saying the puzzles and riddles were difficult, but not overly so, the graphics were great, and that there were only a few problems with the game, mainly with story pacing and its interface.

The editors of Computer Gaming World nominated Shadows of Undrentide for their 2003 "Expansion Pack of the Year" award, which ultimately went to Battlefield 1942: Secret Weapons of WWII. In 2004, the Academy of Interactive Arts & Sciences nominated Shadows of Undrentide for "Computer Role-Playing Game of the Year", but was ultimately awarded to Star Wars: Knights of the Old Republic.

Deekin Scalesinger, a companion character introduced in Shadows of Undrentide expansion, was included by Kimberley Wallace of Game Informer in her 2013 list of best BioWare characters. Deekin returns in a subsequent expansion pack of Neverwinter Nights, Hordes of the Underdark as a recruitable henchman, and also makes a cameo appearance in Neverwinter Nights II.
