= Neverwinter Nights 2 =

2006 video game

- North American PC cover art
- Developer: Obsidian Entertainment
- Publisher: Atari, Inc.
- Director: Chris Avellone
- Producer: Ryan Rucinski
- Designers: Ferret Baudoin; J.E. Sawyer
- Programmers: Chris Jones; Frank Kowalkowski
- Artist: Tramell Isaac
- Composers: Dave Fraser; Neil Goldberg
- Series: Neverwinter Nights
- Engine: Electron Engine
- Platforms: Microsoft Windows; Mac OS X; Nintendo Switch; PlayStation 5; Xbox Series X/S
- Release: Microsoft Windows: NA: October 31, 2006; EU: November 3, 2006; AU: November 16, 2006; Mac OS X: NA: February 26, 2008; WW: March 3, 2008; Nintendo Switch, PlayStation 5, Xbox Series X/S: WW: July 15, 2025
- Genre: Role-playing video game
- Modes: Single-player, multiplayer

Neverwinter Nights 2 is a role-playing video game developed by Obsidian Entertainment and published by Atari, Inc. It is the second installment in the Neverwinter Nights series and is the sequel to BioWare's Neverwinter Nights, based on the Dungeons & Dragons fantasy tabletop role-playing game.

It utilizes an adaptation of the Dungeons & Dragons 3.5 edition game rules. Players create player characters to represent themselves in the game, using the same character creation rules as found in the Dungeons & Dragons game. They may gain the assistance of additional party members, and they eventually acquire a keep that can be used as a base of operations. The story is set in the Forgotten Realms campaign setting, centered in the city of Neverwinter. The story is mostly unrelated to the first Neverwinter Nights game. It follows the journey of an orphaned adventurer investigating a group of mysterious artifacts known as "silver shards" and their connection to an ancient, evil spirit known as the King of Shadows.

Neverwinter Nights 2 went into development in July 2004. This sequel was designed with the Aurora Engine, also used by its predecessor, and the game's toolset was included in the game's release for players to use in designing their own adventures. The game's design team drew upon older role-playing video games, and decided that the player character would have to earn the respect of others by the things the character does. The game was also designed to be playable with other players online in a cooperative fashion. The game was released in October and November 2006. Official multiplayer support for the game was suspended in December 2012. In response, the Neverwinter Nights 2 community developed several initiatives by which players can continue to play the game online.

Reviews of Neverwinter Nights 2 were generally positive. Reviewers were pleased with the changes that had been made from the first game in the series, especially regarding the storyline and party management. The game won GameSpot's Best Story award for 2006. One of the most commonly raised complaints about the game was the presence of numerous technical glitches in its initial release. Two official expansions and one official adventure pack have been released for the game: Mask of the Betrayer in 2007, Storm of Zehir in 2008, and Mysteries of Westgate in 2009.

== Gameplay ==
Neverwinter Nights 2 is played in the third person from a top-down perspective, where the player controls a hero and his or her attendant party. As a role-playing video game based on the Dungeons & Dragons 3.5 edition ruleset, players build a player character in accordance with the character creation rules of Dungeons & Dragons, which includes selecting a race and class, then assigning skill points. There are sixteen races and twelve classes available, including the rogue and the wizard, as well as an additional seventeen unlockable classes. Neverwinter Nights 2 makes use of the d20 system introduced in Dungeons & Dragons, where a die roll or random number is used to determine the probability and effectiveness of every action, including attacks and saving throws. The player character can recruit companions during the campaign, and may form a party with up to three of them. Party members can be controlled directly by the player or given orders dictating how to behave in combat.

An in-game screenshot. The player character and his party are in the middle of the screen. The interface is around the border, with a mini-map, dialogue box, and a variety of hotkeys.

The game is set in the Forgotten Realms campaign setting. The party is able to explore various areas of Faerûn—including its cities, forests, and dungeons—while earning experience points and treasure by defeating monsters and completing quests. The entire party collaborates during combat, with characters' behavior determined by their class and abilities. Upon gaining specified amounts of experience, characters level up, allowing them to earn new abilities such as magic spells and feats. Some races, like the drow, are more powerful than others and require characters to accumulate more experience to earn levels. Characters can access Prestige classes, more specialized versions of base classes, by fulfilling certain requirements. The warpriest, for example, is available to divine spellcasters such as clerics after they have reached a set level of power. Items such as weapons, armor, potions, and scrolls can be used or equipped by characters, and some equipment changes will affect a character's appearance. As the game progresses, the player character acquires a keep that can be used as a base of operations. Initially, the keep is in a state of disrepair and must be refurbished using party funds. As the keep is improved, it can generate income and gain stronger defenses to repel sieges. Non-player characters such as equipment vendors can be recruited to work at the keep, and the player must manage the training of guards and the allocation of resources.

Before the online component was disabled (see Development below), the campaign of Neverwinter Nights 2 could be played with other players, but only from the beginning of the storyline. The rules could be modified for multiplayer games, such as deactivating friendly fire. A BioWare community account was required to play online, and players were able to search for game servers matching their style of play. Players could upload and play modules online created with the Electron toolset, which is included with the Windows version of the game.

== Story ==
=== Setting and characters ===
Neverwinter Nights 2 takes place in and around the city of Neverwinter, in the Sword Coast region of Faerûn. The first part of the game is set in the small Sword Coast village of West Harbor, which was the site of a battle between an evil host led by an entity known as the "King of Shadows" and the warriors aligned with Neverwinter. The player character's fate is tied to this battle, during which his or her mother was killed. During the campaign, the player has the opportunity to recruit party members to aid in the cause, including the violent dwarf Khelgar and a vocal young tiefling Neeshka. Antagonists include the King of Shadows, a manipulative Luskan diplomat named Torio, and the warlock Ammon Jerro.

=== Plot ===
The game's opening cinematic, portraying the main antagonist, the King of Shadows (left), in battle with the warlock Ammon Jerro

Neverwinter Nights 2 is composed of three distinct acts. The game's first act begins in the village of West Harbor, where the player's character was raised as an orphan by the elven ranger Daeghun. After a festival, the town is attacked by a group, led by a githyanki, in search of an unnamed object. Afterward, the character is sent by Daeghun to retrieve a mysterious silver shard from a nearby cave, which was left there years earlier after the defeat of the King of Shadows. The character then sets out for Neverwinter, meeting other adventurers along the way, several of whom are available for recruitment. In Neverwinter, Daeghun's half-brother Duncan offers a more comprehensive explanation of the situation. Duncan instructs the party to speak with Aldanon, a sage who reveals the shard's connection with a dead warlock and his descendant, a farmer named Shandra Jerro. However, the githyanki kidnap Shandra and the player character must rescue her. At the end of Act I, the party dispatches the githyanki, rescues Shandra, and learns of the origin of the shards.

In act two, the party discovers that an evil wizard, Black Garius, is plotting to subsume the power of a powerful entity known as the King of Shadows. The party interrupts Garius during the scheme and Garius is apparently killed. As a reward, the protagonist earns a title of nobility and is awarded a stronghold, Crossroads Keep, by Neverwinter's political leader, Lord Nasher. After tracking down Ammon Jerro, the warlock who fought the King of Shadows and the grandfather of Shandra Jerro, the player character learns that the King of Shadows was once known as the Guardian, a powerful creation of the ancient fallen empire of Illefarn. The Guardian was corrupted after tapping into a dark magical energy called the Shadow Weave. Thereafter the Guardian destroyed Illefarn in a misguided attempt to protect it. Ammon is initially unwilling to help the player character, but after inadvertently slaying his descendant Shandra, he repents and joins the party.

Act three introduces the Shadow Reavers, a sect of powerful undead mages that include a revived Garius, still intent on resurrecting the King of Shadows. The player must prepare Crossroad Keep for imminent battle by fortifying its troops and lands. After additional shards are retrieved by defeating Shadow Reavers, the shards are reformed into a powerful unique weapon for the player character, the Silver Sword of Gith. The sword, stolen by Ammon Jerro in the first battle against the King of Shadows, is the only weapon that can resist the enemy's power. The army of the Shadow Reavers lays siege to Crossroads Keep and is repelled by the occupants. After making their way through Garius' new stronghold, the party engages the mage in a second confrontation. After Garius is defeated, good members of the party begin the final fight against the King of Shadows. Evil and neutral characters (including the player character, if applicable) can decide to attack the King or fight alongside him. A cutscene afterwards details the battle's effect on the world, and ends on a cliffhanger which is continued in the Mask of the Betrayer expansion pack.

== Development ==
Neverwinter Nights 2 was unofficially announced on April 1, 2004, when an Atari employee listed the names of several games in development, including a "NWN2" in response to an inflammatory comment on Atari's forums. The company officially announced the game on August 4, 2004. Obsidian Entertainment handled development of the game and BioWare, the company that created the first Neverwinter Nights, offered support and guidance to Obsidian. The two companies collaborated in a similar manner on Star Wars: Knights of the Old Republic II, an Obsidian–developed sequel to a BioWare game. BioWare joint CEO Ray Muzyka said "Neverwinter Nights remains one of the most important titles BioWare has ever created. We certainly plan to remain involved in the production and development of Neverwinter Nights 2". Obsidian employed several game designers from the defunct Black Isle Studios, which developed other Dungeons & Dragons role-playing video games such as Planescape: Torment, the Icewind Dale series, and the Baldur's Gate series. Development of Neverwinter Nights 2 began in July 2004, when Obsidian assigned several staff members to work on the project. Staff included Darren Monahan, the producer of several Icewind Dale and Baldur's Gate: Dark Alliance games; Marc Holmes, art director of the first Neverwinter Nights; and Chris Avellone, lead designer of Planescape: Torment and Knights of the Old Republic II.

The Electron toolset being used to create a module

BioWare provided its Aurora Engine from Neverwinter Nights for the sequel. One of the decisions to use Aurora rather than build a new engine from scratch was the toolset—Obsidian wanted players to continue to be able to make content for the game, which may not have been possible with a new engine. BioWare made itself available to Obsidian with technical support on the engine, but Obsidian planned on completely overhauling Aurora, including its code. The designers wanted to improve the visuals of the first game with additions such as better lighting and textures, which required significant changes to the engine. The upgraded engine was referred to as Electron. Electron was designed to incorporate DirectX to make it compatible for a potential Xbox 360 release, but Obsidian eventually abandoned plans for a port to the system for financial reasons. The toolset that was used to create the game was also revamped, and included several additions like a customizable interface, a new dialogue format, and building assistants—similar to the wizards found in Microsoft Word and Excel. Like Neverwinter Nights, the toolset was included in the game's release for players to use.

Obsidian drew on older computer RPGs for inspiration on the storyline and gameplay, like Fallout and the Ultima series. Obsidian CEO Feargus Urquhart said "We've been thinking about a lot of older RPGs, and we have this feeling that something has been lost with recent RPGs." He compared Neverwinter Nights 2 to Baldur's Gate II, stating that he wanted to expand upon the city of Neverwinter as Baldur's Gate II had done with its setting, Athkatla. "We're looking at how to make Neverwinter a really intriguing place to be, and make it a place where you go and come back to and go and come back to and have it really be a center for the game," Urquhart said. The game's story, while still revolving around the city of Neverwinter, would be unrelated to Neverwinter Nights. Instead of starting the game as a powerful, important character, players would begin Neverwinter Nights 2 as nobodies. Obsidian wanted realism in the game and concrete consequences for the player's actions. The story would be centered on the player character, who would have to gradually earn the respect of Lord Nasher and the city of Neverwinter.

At the beginning of the game, the main character will run into a person of importance and be ignored like any other lump of crap with legs. The powerful simply don't notice those weaker than themselves. It's this kind of philosophy that promises a more cohesive story.

— Dan Adams, IGN

Instead of the henchmen system used in Neverwinter Nights, Obsidian overhauled the game's party format to mimic Knights of the Old Republic II. Like the Neverwinter Nights expansion Hordes of the Underdark, the player would be able to recruit more than one party member. Each character could be directly controlled, but party members would also be able to come to a player's aid even when not controlled, such as summoning a rogue to open a locked chest. Companions would have distinct personalities and their own agendas, but it would be possible for the player character to influence them. Characters can leave the party permanently under certain circumstances. Other changes from the first game include the addition of prestige classes and more exotic races, like planetouched and Elven subraces.

In 2012, GameSpy, the company providing multiplayer support for the game, was purchased by Glu Mobile. After the purchase, Glu Mobile raised the fees being charged to publishers to provide online services for their games. The new owners then shut down a number of the online services for different games, including Neverwinter Nights 2. GameSpy claimed that the developers had allowed their contracts to lapse, and, after providing free services for a time, were no longer willing to continue.

== Release ==
Neverwinter Nights 2 was ready for mass production on October 17, 2006, and was released on October 31 in the United States, on November 3 in Europe, and on November 16 in Australia. The Electron toolset was available early for consumers who pre-ordered the game through GameStop or Best Buy, as well as exclusive class-specific special items. Alongside the standard version, Atari also published a special edition. The United States and Australia "Limited Edition" contained several physical items like a cloth map depicting the Sword Coast, as well as in-game benefits like the "Blessed of Waukeen" feat that grants players a bonus to saving throws. The Europe special edition was split into two separate boxes, dubbed "Lawful Good Limited Edition" and "Chaotic Evil Limited Edition", a reference to the Dungeons & Dragons concept of moral alignment. Each box contained the collectibles available in the United States and Australia versions, as well as copies of the original Neverwinter Nights and its expansions, and a trial code for Dungeons & Dragons Online: Stormreach.

Atari licensed Aspyr Media to develop a port of Neverwinter Nights 2 for the Apple Macintosh; the game was announced shortly before the Windows release. The initial announcement gave a December 2007 release date, but the port was not shipped to retailers until February 2008. It included the full version of Neverwinter Nights 2 with the exception of the editor toolkit. Atari announced in March 2008 that many of its PC games, including Neverwinter Nights 2 and its first expansion, Mask of the Betrayer, would be available online via Valve's digital distribution service Steam. A "Gold Edition" bundle was also published in May 2008 containing copies of Neverwinter Nights 2 and Mask of the Betrayer. A platinum edition containing the original game and both its expansion packs was released on the Steam platform on December 27, 2010. As of May 2013, Neverwinter Nights 2 is no longer sold through Steam.

A complete edition that contains the original game and the three expansion packs was released on GOG.com on January 24, 2013. The game was added to the GOG Preservation Program on July 14, 2025, ensuring ongoing compatibility with modern systems. An enhanced version developed and published by Aspyr was released for Nintendo Switch, PlayStation 5, Windows, and Xbox Series X/S on July 15, 2025.

== Expansions ==
- Mask of the Betrayer, the game's first expansion pack, was announced in April 2007 by Atari and Obsidian Entertainment. It was released on September 28, 2007, in Europe, on October 9 in the United States, and on November 1 in Australia. Mask of the Betrayer's story begins shortly after the events of Neverwinter Nights 2 and is set in the country of Rashemen, a matriarchy near Thay. The expansion contains several new options for character development, including additional races and prestige classes. It received favorable reviews from critics.
- Storm of Zehir was announced in June 2008. The pack is set on the Sword Coast and Chult areas of the Forgotten Realms and was released on November 18, 2008, in the United States, on November 21 in Europe, and on December 11 in Australia. Despite being released after the introduction of the D&D 4th edition ruleset, Storm of Zehir made use of the 3.5 ruleset like its predecessors. The expansion featured gameplay with similarities to previous D&D video game series Baldur's Gate and Icewind Dale and received mixed reviews.
- Mysteries of Westgate was announced in October 2007. Atari referred to it as an "adventure pack", comparing it to the premium modules of Neverwinter Nights. The game was developed by Canadian-based Ossian Studios, the designers of the cancelled premium module Darkness over Daggerford. It is set in the Dragon Coast city of Westgate. Atari's initial press release gave a release date of fall 2007 for Mysteries of Westgate, but it was not released until April 29, 2009.

== Reception ==
Reception

Aggregate scores
Aggregator	Score
GameRankings	82%
Metacritic	82/100

Review scores
Publication	Score
1Up.com	C+
Eurogamer	8 of 10
Game Informer	8 of 10
GameSpot	8.6 of 10
GameSpy	4/5
GameZone	8.7 of 10

Award
Publication	Award
GameSpot	Best Story (2006)

Reception of Neverwinter Nights 2 was generally favorable. It placed number 6 on Amazon's video game pre-order list the week before its release, and was a best-seller for several weeks afterwards. It received GameSpot's "Best Story" award for 2006, beating out the reader's choice, The Elder Scrolls IV: Oblivion. It was also nominated for a Golden Joystick Award for Best PC Game of 2006. The editors of Computer Games Magazine presented Neverwinter Nights 2 with their 2006 "Best Writing" award, and it was a runner-up for their list of the year's top 10 computer games.

While some reviewers considered Neverwinter Nights 2 superior to its predecessor, Neverwinter Nights, the sequel received lower overall review ratings. Implementation of the Dungeons & Dragons 3.5 ruleset was praised as faithful to the pen-and-paper version, with GameDaily stating "The 3.5 edition ruleset is in full swing in Neverwinter Nights 2, where critical hits can devastate your entire party." The game's representation of the Forgotten Realms campaign setting was also well received. The storyline was widely considered one of the game's strong points and an improvement over Neverwinter Nights. GameSpy stated that the single–player campaign was "worthy of its exhaustive pedigree", and Game Informer's reviewer said "This title easily trumps the original NWN's campaign with a vastly superior story and characters". Another reviewer declared it "one of the best written games in history". Aaron R. Conklin of The Wisconsin State Journal said, "It'd be very easy to be turned off by the first mundane chapters of the game's sprawling plot. ... Stick with it: Once your party hits Neverwinter (and reaches level seven or so), the proceedings become significantly more interesting—especially in terms of character interaction and development. ... NWN2 is a masterpiece of storytelling and scope." Conklin and Matt Slagle of Deseret News were pleased with the ethical choices in the game, with both noting approvingly that diplomacy was a very valid option that could succeed in place of combat.

Other reviewers were less convinced, with Australia's PALGN referring to the story as "rather predictable and clichéd". Jonathan Parkyn of Personal Computer World wrote, "Dialogue is NWN2's key component. ... but those who favour fisticuffs may find it tiresome after playing for several billion hours." Similarly, reception of Neverwinter Nights 2's graphics was mixed. Some reviewers referred to the visuals as "new age" and "beautiful", but others noticed inconsistencies in their rendering and performance, especially on lower-end PCs. The Sydney Morning Herald said "The detailed 3D engine allows for lush scenery, giving you a greater sense of exploration as you poke around the rustic villages and murky swamps". Several comments on the audio and voice acting were positive, though one reviewer expressed disappointment that some sound effects had apparently been recycled from Neverwinter Nights. Conklin called the in-game camera "abysmal" and said the game had many graphical glitches. Slagle agreed, writing, "I had a lot of stuttering graphics and voiceovers that were out of synch with the characters' on-screen animations."

The most common criticism of the game was its numerous technical glitches. Adam Diamond of Isthmus was not happy with the pathfinding, writing, "I often found myself traveling solo through a dungeon, my companions spread out far behind me, leaving me vulnerable to attack. What's the point of having henchmen if they're not there to protect you?". Some reviews compared Neverwinter Nights 2 to Star Wars: Knights of the Old Republic II, a previous Obsidian game that had received similar complaints. The bugs were described as disruptive to gameplay and "downright infuriating", and one reviewer encountered a "showstopper bug" in the initial retail version that prevented him from playing the game past a certain point. The bugs were said to negatively affect NPC AI, camera operation, and pathfinding. One review stated "The launch–to–load time is fairly long so be prepared to wonder if the game has crashed or is loading." Obsidian was quick to release fixes for several bugs, but later reviews still described the glitches as a serious problem. 1UP.com's review, written two weeks after the game's release, stated "But the sad truth is that NWN2 shipped in a pretty messy state, and even after a couple patches (as of this writing), the biggest problems remain."

The Mac version of Neverwinter Nights 2 received mixed reception, and reviewers complained about its lack of the editor toolkit and its high system requirements.

1UP.com writer Matt Peckham caused controversy with his initial review of Neverwinter Nights 2. A 1UP editor pulled the review from the site and officially retracted it from the print version of the January 2007 issue of Games for Windows: The Official Magazine, explaining that "we felt that this particular review of Neverwinter Nights 2 did a disservice to fans of the [role-playing game] genre." The subsequent review by Jeff Green gave the game a score of C+ and is one of the most negative reviews among major outlets. A modified version of Peckham's review was later published by the Sci Fi Channel, and another version of the review can be found at Penny Arcade.

=== Modding community ===
The Neverwinter Nights 2 level editor and design toolset were widely praised, with the Deseret News referring to them as "insanely powerful and complex". Neverwinter Nights 2 did not attract as active a modding community as Neverwinter Nights, and PC Gamer attributed this to the complexity and steep learning curve of the Electron toolset compared to the Aurora toolset of Neverwinter Nights. Notable Neverwinter Nights 2 modding projects included remakes of Baldur's Gate, Icewind Dale, and RuneScape.
