= Neverwinter Nights: Kingmaker =

Expansion pack for Neverwinter Nights

- Developer: BioWare
- Publisher: Atari Interactive
- Series: Neverwinter Nights
- Platforms: Windows, Nintendo Switch, PlayStation 4, Xbox One
- Release: Windows; November 10, 2004; Switch, PS4, Xbox One; December 3, 2019
- Genre: Role-playing
- Mode: Single-player

Neverwinter Nights: Kingmaker is an expansion pack released for BioWare's Neverwinter Nights that includes three premium modules: Kingmaker, Shadowguard, and Witch's Wake. Released in November 2004, Kingmaker won the Academy of Interactive Arts & Sciences' "Computer Role-Playing Game of the Year" award in 2005.

== Modules ==
=== Kingmaker ===
This module requires the Hordes of the Underdark expansion pack and offers around eight hours of gameplay. It is available in lite and full versions, with the former lacking voice acting for NPCs in the module.

==== Plot ====
The module is set in a world that borrows many elements from Forgotten Realms and other Dungeons and Dragons settings. The story takes place near the Keep of Cyan, a northern part of the world. The player's goal is to win an election and become the Lord of the Keep. In order to do so, the player character must persuade at least four of nine guilds to aid him. Only then will the character have a chance to fight his nemesis, the Masked Man, a mysterious mage who uses a small army of creatures to conquer the Keep. On his journeys, the player character also has to reveal the mystery of his own nature and past. An unknown ally of great power also helps the character by granting him a sentient magical weapon with a friendly personality. The player can enlist help from two of four NPCs who traveled with him before the beginning of the game.

It is revealed later that the Masked Man is an Illithid, and the mysterious ally is the main character's grandmother, a demoness of great power who once fell in love with a man, thus making the player character part Tiefling. The Masked Man is also revealed to be the hero's brother. The game culminates with the player killing the Masked Man and becoming the rightful ruler of Cyan.

=== Shadowguard ===
Neverwinter Nights: Shadowguard is a premium module for BioWare's 2002 PC RPG, Neverwinter Nights.

==== Plot ====
The game is set in Abaron, a module-specific setting. The Sarakhan Empire is the most prominent force in this world that is led by a divine emperor named Rakha who wishes to unify the whole world. However, the northern lands refuse to enter the Empire. A mysterious Crimson Prophet is believed to be the leader of the resistance. The story takes place in Ghaarak, an imperial city located near the northern territories' border.

The module itself is named after the organization featuring prominently in the game. The player is the son of Ocaris, one of the city's leaders, who is finishing his studies at the academy. After the graduation, the instructor tells the player that a man named Markius is looking for them.

It is soon revealed that the character is meant to enter a secret organization, the Shadowguard, which protects the Empire from various threats. The story leads the player through a series of tasks given by Markius, the leader of the Shadowguard, and his friends. The city of Ghaarak slowly falls into chaos due to the arrival of the Crimson Prophet, a mage willing to destroy the Empire who steals powerful artifacts and kills Ocaris.

A full-scale assault on the city begins, carried out by the northern people under the Crimson Prophet's instructions. The player must escape the doomed city along with the members of the Shadowguard. Battling their way to the docks, they encounter the Crimson Prophet again, but they are unable to defeat him. The module's story ends with the character escaping the city with the Shadowguard on board a ship, the Voyager. The story was meant to be continued, but no sequels were ever made.

=== Witch's Wake ===
Witch's Wake uses an original game setting created for the module, completely independent of Neverwinter Nights' Forgotten Realms setting. It is a dark, mysterious world featuring unique sub-races with their own special abilities.

==== Plot ====
The game starts as the player character (PC) awakens on a battlefield with no memories. A dying prince asks the PC to deliver to his father the message, "She is dead." The PC then meets the Night Hag, a witch who is willing to help uncover their past. She grants the PC passage to the Plane of Sorrow, a place where the living world collides with the world of the dead, Stygia. The Plane of Sorrow is inhabited by souls who are about to enter the world of undead, and Filchers, spirits notorious for their thieving nature. The player journeys through the world looking for answers, sometimes visiting the Plane of Sorrow. After several dangerous encounters, the player enters a dwarf village, Brogan's Arm, where the Cavanaugh Stone, a holy artifact of great importance, has been stolen. At the end of module, the player encounters a man named Caldrian, who finally reveals what happened.

The PC remembers that they were part of a witch hunter squad that battled a witch and apparently killed her. The squad was obliterated by her power, and the survivors lost their memories.

A continuation module was planned but never made.

== Reception ==
Gameplanet gave a score of 3.5 out of 5 and wrote: "In summary, while there's nothing really new here - either graphically or in gameplay, in our opinion the Neverwinter Nights: Kingmaker modules are a worthy tribute to this RPG classic."
