= D.I.C.E. Award for Role-Playing Game of the Year =

Annual award presented by the Academy of Interactive Arts & Sciences

- Country: United States
- Presented by: Academy of Interactive Arts & Sciences
- First award: 1998
- Currently held by: Clair Obscur: Expedition 33
- Website: www.interactive.org

The D.I.C.E. Award for Role-Playing Game of the Year is an award presented annually by the Academy of Interactive Arts & Sciences during the D.I.C.E. Awards. "This award honors a title, single-player or multi-player, where an individual assumes the role of one or more characters and develops those characters in terms of abilities, statistics, and/or traits as the game progresses. Gameplay involves exploring, acquiring resources, solving puzzles, and interacting with player or non-player characters in the persistent world. Through the player's actions, his/her virtual characters' statistics or traits demonstrably evolve throughout the game". All active creative/technical, business, and affiliate members of the Academy are qualified to vote for this category. The award initially had separate awards for console games and computer games at the 1st Annual Interactive Achievement Awards in 1998, with the first winners being Final Fantasy VII for console and Dungeon Keeper for computer. Throughout the history of this category, there have been numerous mergers and changes for role-playing related games. The current version was established at the 21st Annual D.I.C.E. Awards in 2018, which was awarded to Nier: Automata.

The award's most recent winner is Clair Obscur: Expedition 33, developed by Sandfall Interactive and published by Kepler Interactive.

== History ==
Initially the Interactive Achievement Awards had separate categories for Console Role-Playing Game of the Year and Computer Role-Playing Game of the Year. The 1999 awards ceremony featured genre specific Online awards, including Online Role-Playing Game of the Year. There was only one Online Game of the Year category in 2000. The console and PC Role-Playing game categories were merged with the Adventure game categories at the 2000 awards ceremony; this was most likely because the previous console adventure game winners also won the award for console role-playing, which were Final Fantasy VII in 1998 and The Legend of Zelda: Ocarina of Time in 1999. In the following year, the Adventure game category was eventually merged with the Action game category, so a separate award for Role-Playing games resumed. In addition, an online category for Massive Multiplayer/Persistent World Game of the Year was introduced in 2001; this may have been the result of the MMORPGs Ultima Online and EverQuest winning Online Game of the Year in 1998 and 2000, respectively. Starting in 2005, genre-specific awards would no longer have separate awards for console and computer games, so it simply became Role-Playing Game of the Year. In 2010, Role-Playing Game of the Year was merged with Massively Multiplayer Game of the Year, since most massively multiplayer online games were MMORPGs. The award would later be simplified back to Role-Playing Game of the Year in 2018.

- Console Role-Playing Game of the Year (1998—1999, 2001—2005)
- Computer Role-Playing Game of the Year (1998—1999, 2001—2005)
- Online Role-Playing Game of the Year (1999)
- Console Adventure/Role-Playing Game of the Year (2000)
- Computer Adventure/Role-Playing Game of the Year (2000)
- Massively Multiplayer/Persistent World Game of the Year (2001—2009)
- Role-Playing Game of the Year (2006—2009, 2018—present)
- Role-Playing/Massively Multiplayer Game of the Year (2010—2017)

== Winners and nominees ==
=== 1990s ===
Table key
Indicates the winner

Year	Game	Developer(s)	Publisher(s)	Ref.
1997/1998 (1st)	Console Role-Playing Game of the Year			
1997/1998 (1st)	Final Fantasy VII	SquareSoft	Sony Computer Entertainment	
1997/1998 (1st)	Alundra	Matrix Software	Working Designs, Sony Computer Entertainment Japan, Psygnosis	
1997/1998 (1st)	Suikoden	Konami	Konami	
1997/1998 (1st)	Wild Arms	Media.Vision	Sony Computer Entertainment	
1997/1998 (1st)	Computer Role-Playing Game of the Year			
1997/1998 (1st)	Dungeon Keeper	Bullfrog Productions	Electronic Arts	
1997/1998 (1st)	Fallout	Black Isle Studios	Interplay Productions	
1997/1998 (1st)	Lands of Lore: Guardians of Destiny	Westwood Studios	Virgin Interactive	
1998/1999 (2nd)	Console Role-Playing Game of the Year			
1998/1999 (2nd)	The Legend of Zelda: Ocarina of Time	Nintendo EAD	Nintendo	
1998/1999 (2nd)	Panzer Dragoon Saga	Team Andromeda	Sega	
1998/1999 (2nd)	Parasite Eve	SquareSoft	Square Electronic Arts	
1998/1999 (2nd)	Pokémon Red and Blue	Game Freak	Nintendo	
1998/1999 (2nd)	Computer Role-Playing Game of the Year			
1998/1999 (2nd)	Baldur's Gate	BioWare	Black Isle Studios	
1998/1999 (2nd)	Fallout 2	Black Isle Studios	Interplay Productions	
1998/1999 (2nd)	Might and Magic VI: The Mandate of Heaven	New World Computing	The 3DO Company	
1998/1999 (2nd)	Return to Krondor	PyroTechnix	Sierra On-Line	
1998/1999 (2nd)	Online Role-Playing Game of the Year			
1998/1999 (2nd)	Ultima Online: The Second Age	Origin Systems	Electronic Arts	
1998/1999 (2nd)	DragonRealms: Maritime Expansion	Simutronics	Simutronics	
1998/1999 (2nd)	Meridian 59: Dark Auspices	Archetype Interactive	The 3DO Company	
1999/2000 (3rd)	Console Adventure/Role-Playing Game of the Year			
1999/2000 (3rd)	Final Fantasy VIII	SquareSoft	Square Electronic Arts	
1999/2000 (3rd)	Legacy of Kain: Soul Reaver	Crystal Dynamics	Eidos Interactive	
1999/2000 (3rd)	Legend of Legaia	Contrail	Sony Computer Entertainment	
1999/2000 (3rd)	Computer Adventure/Role Playing Game of the Year			
1999/2000 (3rd)	Asheron's Call	Turbine	Microsoft	
1999/2000 (3rd)	Gabriel Knight 3: Blood of the Sacred, Blood of the Damned	Sierra On-Line	Sierra On-Line	
1999/2000 (3rd)	Outcast	Appeal	Infogrames	
1999/2000 (3rd)	Planescape: Torment	Black Isle Studios	Interplay Entertainment	
1999/2000 (3rd)	Ultima IX: Ascension	Origin Systems	Electronic Arts	

=== 2000s ===
Year	Game	Developer(s)	Publisher(s)	Ref.
2000 (4th)	Console Role Playing Game of the Year			
2000 (4th)	Final Fantasy IX	SquareSoft	Square Electronic Arts	
2000 (4th)	Chrono Cross	SquareSoft	Square Electronic Arts	
2000 (4th)	Skies of Arcadia	Overworks	Sega	
2000 (4th)	The Legend of Dragoon	Japan Studio	Sony Computer Entertainment	
2000 (4th)	PC Role Playing Game of the Year			
2000 (4th)	Diablo II	Blizzard North	Blizzard Entertainment	
2000 (4th)	Baldur's Gate II: Shadows of Amn	BioWare	Black Isle Studios	
2000 (4th)	Deus Ex	Ion Storm	Eidos Interactive	
2000 (4th)	Icewind Dale	Black Isle Studios	Interplay Entertainment	
2000 (4th)	Massively Multiplayer/Persistent World Game of the Year			
2000 (4th)	EverQuest: The Ruins of Kunark	Verant Interactive	Sony Online Entertainment	
2000 (4th)	Allegiance	Microsoft Research	Microsoft Games	
2000 (4th)	Asheron's Call	Turbine	Microsoft Games	
2000 (4th)	Ultima Online: Renaissance	Origin Systems	Electronic Arts	
2001 (5th)	Console Role Playing Game of the Year			
2001 (5th)	Baldur's Gate: Dark Alliance	Snowblind Studios	Black Isle Studios	
2001 (5th)	Castlevania: Circle of the Moon	Konami	Konami	
2001 (5th)	Dark Cloud	Level-5	Sony Computer Entertainment	
2001 (5th)	Golden Sun	Camelot Software Planning	Nintendo	
2001 (5th)	Paper Mario	Intelligent Systems	Nintendo	
2001 (5th)	The Legend of Zelda: Oracle of Ages	Flagship/Capcom	Nintendo	
2001 (5th)	PC Role Playing Game of the Year			
2001 (5th)	Baldur's Gate II: Throne of Bhaal	BioWare	Black Isle Studios	
2001 (5th)	Diablo II: Lord of Destruction	Blizzard North	Blizzard Entertainment	
2001 (5th)	Wizardry 8	Sir-Tech Canada	Sir-Tech	
2001 (5th)	Massively Multiplayer/Persistent World Game of the Year			
2001 (5th)	Dark Age of Camelot	Mythic Entertainment	Vivendi Universal Games	
2001 (5th)	Asheron's Call: Dark Majesty	Turbine	Microsoft Game Studios	
2001 (5th)	Phantasy Star Online	Sonic Team	Sega	
2002 (6th)	Console Role-Playing Game of the Year			
2002 (6th)	Animal Crossing	Nintendo EAD	Nintendo	
2002 (6th)	Final Fantasy X	SquareSoft	Square Electronic Arts	
2002 (6th)	Kingdom Hearts	SquareSoft	Square Electronic Arts	
2002 (6th)	Suikoden III	Konami	Konami	
2002 (6th)	Wild Arms 3	Media.Vision	Sony Computer Entertainment	
2002 (6th)	Computer Role-Playing Game of the Year			
2002 (6th)	Neverwinter Nights	BioWare	Infogrames	
2002 (6th)	Arx Fatalis	Arkane Studios	JoWood Productions	
2002 (6th)	Dungeon Siege	Gas Powered Games	Microsoft Game Studios	
2002 (6th)	Freedom Force	Irrational Games	Crave Entertainment, Electronic Arts	
2002 (6th)	The Elder Scrolls III: Morrowind	Bethesda Game Studios	Bethesda Softworks	
2002 (6th)	Massively Multiplayer/Persistent World Game of the Year			
2002 (6th)	The Sims Online	Maxis	Electronic Arts	
2002 (6th)	Anarchy Online: The Notum Wars	Funcom	Funcom	
2002 (6th)	Asheron's Call 2: Fallen Kings	Turbine	Microsoft Game Studios	
2002 (6th)	Dark Age of Camelot: Shrouded Isles	Mythic Entertainment	Vivendi Universal Games	
2002 (6th)	Toontown Online	Disney's Virtual Reality Studio	Disney Online	
2003 (7th)	Console Role-Playing Game of the Year			
2003 (7th)	Star Wars: Knights of the Old Republic	BioWare	LucasArts	
2003 (7th)	Dark Cloud 2	Level-5	Sony Computer Entertainment	
2003 (7th)	Disgaea: Hour of Darkness	Nippon Ichi Software	Atlus	
2003 (7th)	Final Fantasy X-2	SquareSoft	Square Enix	
2003 (7th)	Xenosaga Episode I	Monolith Soft	Namco	
2003 (7th)	Computer Role-Playing Game of the Year			
2003 (7th)	Star Wars: Knights of the Old Republic	BioWare	LucasArts	
2003 (7th)	Deus Ex: Invisible War	Ion Storm	Eidos Interactive	
2003 (7th)	Dungeon Siege: Legends of Aranna	Gas Powered Games, Mad Doc Software	Microsoft Game Studios	
2003 (7th)	Neverwinter Nights: Shadows of Undrentide	BioWare, Floodgate Entertainment	Atari, Inc.	
2003 (7th)	The Temple of Elemental Evil	Troika Games	Atari, Inc.	
2003 (7th)	Massively Multiplayer/Persistent World Game of the Year			
2003 (7th)	EverQuest: Lost Dungeons of Norrath	Sony Online Entertainment	Sony Online Entertainment	
2003 (7th)	A Tale in the Desert	eGenesis	Desert Nomad Studios	
2003 (7th)	Eve Online: Second Genesis	CCP Games	Simon & Schuster Interactive	
2003 (7th)	Horizons: Empire of Istaria	Virtium	Artifact Entertainment	
2003 (7th)	Puzzle Pirates	Three Rings Design	Three Rings Design	
2004 (8th)	Console Role-Playing Game of the Year			
2004 (8th)	Paper Mario: The Thousand-Year Door	Intelligent Systems	Nintendo	
2004 (8th)	Final Fantasy Crystal Chronicles	The Game Designers Studio	Nintendo	
2004 (8th)	Tales of Symphonia	Namco Tales Studio	Namco	
2004 (8th)	The Bard's Tale	inXile Entertainment	inXile Entertainment	
2004 (8th)	X-Men Legends	Raven Software	Activision	
2004 (8th)	Computer Role-Playing Game of the Year			
2004 (8th)	Neverwinter Nights: Kingmaker	BioWare	Atari, Inc.	
2004 (8th)	Vampire: The Masquerade - Bloodlines	Troika Games	Activision	
2004 (8th)	Massively Multiplayer/Persistent World Game of the Year			
2004 (8th)	World of Warcraft	Blizzard Entertainment	Vivendi Universal Games	
2004 (8th)	City of Heroes	Cryptic Studios	NCSoft	
2004 (8th)	Final Fantasy XI: Chains of Promathia	Square Enix	Sony Computer Entertainment	
2004 (8th)	Star Wars Galaxies: Jump to Lightspeed	Sony Online Entertainment	LucasArts	
2005 (9th)	Role-Playing Game of the Year			
2005 (9th)	Jade Empire	BioWare	Microsoft Game Studios	
2005 (9th)	Dragon Quest VIII: Journey of the Cursed King	Level-5	Square Enix	
2005 (9th)	Dungeon Siege II	Gas Powered Games	Microsoft Game Studios	
2005 (9th)	Fire Emblem: Path of Radiance	Intelligent Systems	Nintendo	
2005 (9th)	Radiata Stories	tri-Ace	Square Enix	
2005 (9th)	Massively Multiplayer/Persistent World Game of the Year (Note: Tie between finalists.)			
2005 (9th)	City of Villains	Cryptic Studios	NCSoft	
2005 (9th)	Guild Wars	ArenaNet	NCSoft	
2005 (9th)	Final Fantasy XI: The Vana'diel Collection	Square Enix	Square Enix	
2005 (9th)	Lineage II: The Chaotic Chronicle	NCSoft	NCSoft	
2006 (10th)	Role-Playing Game of the Year			
2006 (10th)	The Elder Scrolls IV: Oblivion	Bethesda Game Studios	2K Games	
2006 (10th)	Final Fantasy III (Note: Nintendo DS version.)	Matrix Software	Square Enix	
2006 (10th)	Final Fantasy XII	Square Enix	Square Enix	
2006 (10th)	Phantasy Star Universe	Sonic Team	Sega	
2006 (10th)	Titan Quest	Iron Lore Entertainment	THQ	
2006 (10th)	Massively Multiplayer Game of the Year			
2006 (10th)	Guild Wars Nightfall	ArenaNet	NCSoft	
2006 (10th)	Auto Assault	NetDevil	NCSoft	
2006 (10th)	Dungeons & Dragons Online: Stormreach	Turbine	Atari, Inc.	
2006 (10th)	Eve Online: Revelations	CCP Games	CCP Games	
2007 (11th)	Role-Playing Game of the Year			
2007 (11th)	Mass Effect	BioWare	Microsoft Game Studios	
2007 (11th)	Eternal Sonata	tri-Crescendo	Namco Bandai Games	
2007 (11th)	Jeanne d'Arc	Level-5	Sony Computer Entertainment	
2007 (11th)	Rogue Galaxy	Level-5	Sony Computer Entertainment	
2007 (11th)	The Witcher	CD Projekt Red	Atari, Inc.	
2007 (11th)	Massively Multiplayer Game of the Year			
2007 (11th)	World of Warcraft: The Burning Crusade	Blizzard Entertainment	Blizzard Entertainment	
2007 (11th)	Eve Online: Trinity	CCP Games	CCP Games	
2007 (11th)	Guild Wars: Eye of the North	ArenaNet	NCSoft	
2007 (11th)	Tabula Rasa	Destination Games	NCSoft	
2007 (11th)	The Lord of the Rings Online: Shadows of Angmar	Turbine	Midway Games	
2008 (12th)	Role-Playing Game of the Year			
2008 (12th)	Fallout 3	Bethesda Game Studios	Bethesda Softworks	
2008 (12th)	Fable II	Lionhead Studios	Microsoft Game Studios	
2008 (12th)	Pokémon Mystery Dungeon: Explorers of Time	Chunsoft	Nintendo, The Pokémon Company	
2008 (12th)	Tales of Vesperia	Namco Tales Studio	Namco Bandai Games	
2008 (12th)	Massively Multiplayer Game of the Year			
2008 (12th)	World of Warcraft: Wrath of the Lich King	Blizzard Entertainment	Blizzard Entertainment	
2008 (12th)	Eve Online: Quantum Rise	CCP Games	CCP Games	
2008 (12th)	Pirates of the Burning Sea	Flying Lab Software	Sony Online Entertainment	
2008 (12th)	PMOG	GameLayers	GameLayers	
2008 (12th)	Warhammer Online: Age of Reckoning	Mythic Entertainment	Electronic Arts	
2009 (13th)	Dragon Age: Origins	BioWare	Electronic Arts	
2009 (13th)	Borderlands	Gearbox Software	2K Games	
2009 (13th)	Champions Online	Cryptic Studios	Atari, Inc.	
2009 (13th)	Demon's Souls	FromSoftware	Atlus	
2009 (13th)	Mario & Luigi: Bowser's Inside Story	AlphaDream	Nintendo	

=== 2010s ===
Year	Game	Developer(s)	Publisher(s)	Ref.
2010 (14th)	Mass Effect 2	BioWare	Electronic Arts	
2010 (14th)	Dragon Quest IX: Sentinels of the Starry Skies	Square Enix	Nintendo	
2010 (14th)	Fable III	Lionhead Studios	Microsoft Game Studios	
2010 (14th)	Fallout: New Vegas	Obsidian Entertainment	Bethesda Softworks	
2010 (14th)	World of Warcraft: Cataclysm	Blizzard Entertainment	Blizzard Entertainment	
2011 (15th)	The Elder Scrolls V: Skyrim	Bethesda Game Studios	Bethesda Softworks	
2011 (15th)	Dark Souls	FromSoftware	Namco Bandai Games	
2011 (15th)	Deus Ex: Human Revolution	Eidos-Montréal	Square Enix Europe	
2011 (15th)	Star Wars: The Old Republic	BioWare Austin	Electronic Arts	
2011 (15th)	The Witcher 2: Assassins of Kings	CD Projekt Red	CD Projekt	
2012 (16th)	Mass Effect 3	BioWare	Electronic Arts	
2012 (16th)	Diablo III	Blizzard Entertainment	Blizzard Entertainment	
2012 (16th)	Dust: An Elysian Tail	Humble Games	Microsoft Studios	
2012 (16th)	Guild Wars 2	ArenaNet	NCSoft	
2012 (16th)	Torchlight II	Runic Games	Runic Games	
2013 (17th)	Diablo III (Note: Console version.)	Blizzard Entertainment	Blizzard Entertainment	
2013 (17th)	Dota 2	Valve	Valve	
2013 (17th)	Dragon's Dogma: Dark Arisen	Capcom	Capcom	
2013 (17th)	Ni no Kuni: Wrath of the White Witch	Level-5, Studio Ghibli	Namco Bandai Games	
2013 (17th)	Pokémon X and Y	Game Freak	Nintendo	
2014 (18th)	Dragon Age: Inquisition	BioWare	Electronic Arts	
2014 (18th)	Bravely Default	Square Enix	Nintendo	
2014 (18th)	Divinity: Original Sin	Larian Studios	Larian Studios	
2014 (18th)	The Banner Saga	Stoic	Versus Evil	
2014 (18th)	World of Warcraft: Warlords of Draenor	Blizzard Entertainment	Blizzard Entertainment	
2015 (19th)	Fallout 4	Bethesda Game Studios	Bethesda Softworks	
2015 (19th)	Bloodborne	FromSoftware	Sony Computer Entertainment	
2015 (19th)	Pillars of Eternity	Obsidian Entertainment	Paradox Interactive	
2015 (19th)	Undertale	Toby Fox	Toby Fox	
2015 (19th)	The Witcher 3: Wild Hunt	CD Projekt Red	CD Projekt	
2016 (20th)	Dark Souls III	FromSoftware	Bandai Namco Entertainment	
2016 (20th)	Deus Ex: Mankind Divided	Eidos-Montréal	Square Enix Europe	
2016 (20th)	Hyper Light Drifter	Heart Machine	Heart Machine	
2016 (20th)	Tom Clancy's The Division	Massive Entertainment	Ubisoft	
2016 (20th)	World of Warcraft: Legion	Blizzard Entertainment	Blizzard Entertainment	
2017 (21st)	Nier: Automata	PlatinumGames	Square Enix	
2017 (21st)	Divinity: Original Sin II	Larian Studios	Larian Studios	
2017 (21st)	Middle-earth: Shadow of War	Monolith Productions	Warner Bros. Interactive Entertainment	
2017 (21st)	Persona 5	Atlus	Atlus	
2017 (21st)	Torment: Tides of Numenera	inXile Entertainment	Techland Publishing	
2018 (22nd)	Monster Hunter: World	Capcom	Capcom	
2018 (22nd)	Assassin's Creed Odyssey	Ubisoft Quebec	Ubisoft	
2018 (22nd)	Dragon Quest XI: Echoes of an Elusive Age	Square Enix	Square Enix	
2018 (22nd)	Ni no Kuni II: Revenant Kingdom	Level-5	Bandai Namco Entertainment	
2018 (22nd)	Pillars of Eternity II: Deadfire	Obsidian Entertainment	Techland Publishing	
2019 (23rd)	The Outer Worlds	Obsidian Entertainment	Private Division	
2019 (23rd)	Disco Elysium	ZA/UM	ZA/UM	
2019 (23rd)	Final Fantasy XIV: Shadowbringers	Square Enix	Square Enix	
2019 (23rd)	Kingdom Hearts III	Square Enix	Square Enix	
2019 (23rd)	Pokémon Sword and Shield	Game Freak	Nintendo	

=== 2020s ===
Year	Game	Developer(s)	Publisher(s)	Ref.
2020 (24th)	Final Fantasy VII Remake	Square Enix	Square Enix	
2020 (24th)	Cyberpunk 2077	CD Projekt Red	CD Projekt	
2020 (24th)	Persona 5 Royal	Atlus	Sega	
2020 (24th)	Wasteland 3	inXile Entertainment	Deep Silver	
2020 (24th)	Yakuza: Like a Dragon	Ryu Ga Gotoku Studio	Sega	
2021 (25th)	Final Fantasy XIV: Endwalker	Square Enix	Square Enix	
2021 (25th)	Pathfinder: Wrath of the Righteous	Owlcat Games	META Publishing	
2021 (25th)	Shin Megami Tensei V	Atlus	Sega	
2021 (25th)	Tales of Arise	Bandai Namco Studios	Bandai Namco Entertainment	
2021 (25th)	Wildermyth	Worldwalker Games	WhisperGames	
2022 (26th)	Elden Ring	FromSoftware	Bandai Namco Entertainment	
2022 (26th)	Citizen Sleeper	Jump Over the Age	Fellow Traveller Games	
2022 (26th)	Weird West	WolfEye Studios	Devolver Digital	
2022 (26th)	World of Warcraft: Dragonflight	Blizzard Entertainment	Blizzard Entertainment	
2022 (26th)	Xenoblade Chronicles 3	Monolith Soft	Nintendo	
2023 (27th)	Baldur's Gate 3	Larian Studios	Larian Studios	
2023 (27th)	Cyberpunk 2077: Phantom Liberty	CD Projekt Red	CD Projekt	
2023 (27th)	Diablo IV	Blizzard Entertainment	Blizzard Entertainment	
2023 (27th)	Final Fantasy XVI	Square Enix	Square Enix	
2023 (27th)	Starfield	Bethesda Game Studios	Bethesda Softworks	
2024 (28th)	Metaphor: ReFantazio	Studio Zero	Atlus	
2024 (28th)	Dragon Age: The Veilguard	BioWare	Electronic Arts	
2024 (28th)	Elden Ring Shadow of the Erdtree	FromSoftware	Bandai Namco Entertainment	
2024 (28th)	Final Fantasy VII Rebirth	Square Enix	Square Enix	
2024 (28th)	Like a Dragon: Infinite Wealth	Ryu Ga Gotoku Studio	Sega	
2025 (29th)	Clair Obscur: Expedition 33	Sandfall Interactive	Kepler Interactive	
2025 (29th)	Citizen Sleeper 2: Starward Vector	Jump Over the Age	Fellow Traveller Games	
2025 (29th)	Kingdom Come: Deliverance II	Warhorse Studios	Deep Silver	
2025 (29th)	Monster Hunter Wilds	Capcom	Capcom	
2025 (29th)	The Outer Worlds 2	Obsidian Entertainment	Xbox Game Studios	

== Multiple nominations and wins ==
=== Developers and publishers ===
Square Enix has received the most nominations as a publisher, including nominations before the merger of SquareSoft and Enix. Electronic Arts has published the most award winners for the RPG genre, which included titles under collaboration with SquareSoft before their merger with Enix. Sega has published the most nominees without winning a single award.

SquareSoft/Square Enix has developed the most finalists in this category, while BioWare has developed the most winners. Level-5 has developed the most nominations without a single win. BioWare, SquareSoft and Square Enix are the only developers to have consecutive wins for RPG awards. ArenaNet, Blizzard Entertainment, SquareSoft, Square Enix, and Electronic Arts are the only publishers with back-to-back wins for RPG awards.

- SquareSoft won Console Adventure/Role-Playing Game of the Year in 2000 with Final Fantasy VIII, and won Console Role-Playing Game of the Year in 2001 with Final Fantasy IX; both were published by Square Electronic Arts, a subsidiary of EA that was part of a partnership with SquareSoft.
- BioWare won Computer Role-Playing Game of the Year four years in row from 2002—2005, and technically won a fifth year, winning Role-Playing Game of the Year in 2006.
  - Baldur's Gate II: Throne of Bhaal (2002)
  - Neverwinter Nights (2003)
  - Star Wars: Knights of the Old Repuplic (2004)
  - Neverwinter Nights: Kingmaker (2005)
  - Jade Empire (2006)
- ArenaNet tied for Massively Multiplayer Game of the Year in 2006 with Guild Wars, and won in 2007 with Guild Wars Nightfall.
- Blizzard Entertainment won Massively Multiplayer Game of the Year with the World of Warcraft expansions The Burning Crusade in 2008, and Wrath of the Lich King in 2009.
- BioWare, now owned by Electronic Arts, won Role-Playing Game of the Year back-to-back again in 2010 with Dragon Age: Origins, and in 2011 with Mass Effect 2.
- Square Enix won Role-Playing Game of the Year back-to-back again in 2021 with Final Fantasy VII Remake, and in 2022 with Final Fantasy XIV: Endwalker.

In 2003, BioWare became the only developer to win both Console Role-Playing Game of the Year and Computer Role-Playing Game of the Year within the same year with Star Wars: Knights of the Old Republic, which was published by LucasArts. Black Isle Studios has also published the winners for console and computer RPGs in 2002, but with different developers: Baldur's Gate: Dark Alliance for console, developed by Snowblind Studios, and Baldur's Gate II: Throne of Bhaal for computer, developed by BioWare. NCSoft has published both games that had tied for Massive Multiplayer/Persistent World Game of the Year in 2006.

Developers
Developer	Nominations	Wins
BioWare	16	12
SquareSoft/Square Enix	20	5
Blizzard Entertainment	10	4
Bethesda Game Studios	6	4
FromSoftware	6	2
ArenaNet	4	2
Sony Online Entertainment (Note: Includes Verant Entertainment.)	3	2
Nintendo EAD	2	2
Turbine	6	1
Obsidian Entertainment	5	1
Atlus (Note: Studio Zero is an internal development division in Atlus)	4	1
Capcom	4	1
Intelligent Systems	3	1
Larian Studios	3	1
Mythic Entertainment	3	1
Origin Systems	3	1
Blizzard North	2	1
Level-5	7	0
CD Projekt Red	5	0
Black Isle Studios	4	0
CCP Games	4	0
Cryptic Studios	3	0
Game Freak	3	0
Gas Powered Games	3	0
inXile Entertainment	3	0
Konami	3	0
Eidos-Montréal	2	0
Ion Storm	2	0
Jump Over the Age	2	0
Lionhead Studios	2	0
Matrix Software	2	0
Media.Vision	2	0
Monolith Soft	2	0
Namco Tales Studio	2	0
Ryu Ga Gotoku Studio	2	0
Sierra On-Line	2	0
Sonic Team	2	0
Troika Games	2	0

Publishers
Publisher	Nominations	Wins
Electronic Arts	18	9
SquareSoft/Square Enix	22	5
Blizzard Entertainment	11	4
Nintendo	16	3
Sony Computer/Interactive Entertainment	15	3
Microsoft/Xbox Game Studios	14	3
ArenaNet	9	3
Bethesda Softworks	6	3
Black Isle Studios	4	3
Namco/Bandai Namco	11	2
Atari, Inc. (Note: It was known as Infogrames before being rebranded as Atari in 2003)	8	2
LucasArts	3	2
Vivendi Universal Games	3	2
Atlus	4	1
Capcom	3	1
Larian Studios	3	1
2K Games	2	1
Sega	8	0
Eidos Interactive/Square Enix Europe	5	0
CD Projekt	4	0
Interplay Productions/Entertainment	4	0
Konami	3	0
Sierra On-Line	3	0
Activision	2	0
Deep Silver	2	0
Fellow Traveller Games	2	0
Techland Publishing	2	0
The 3DO Company	2	0
Ubisoft	2	0

=== Franchises ===
Final Fantasy is the most nominated and award-winning franchise. Deus Ex, Eve Online, and Pokémon have received the most nominations without winning a single award. EverQuest and Mass Effect have won every single time they have been nominated.

There have been a few franchises with back-to-back wins:

- Final Fantasy had two back-to-back wins for RPG awards:
  - Final Fantasy VIII won Console Adventure/Role-Playing Game of the Year in 2000, and Final Fantasy IX won Console Role-Playing Game of the Year in 2001.
  - Final Fantasy VII Remake and Final Fantasy XIV: Endwalker won in 2021 and 2022, respectively.
- Guild Wars tied for Massively Multiplayer Game of the Year in 2006, and Guild Wars Nightfall won in 2007.
- World of Warcraft had back-to-back wins for Massively Multiplayer Game of the Year with the expansion packs The Burning Crusade in 2008, and Wrath of the Lich King in 2009.

Numerous games receives multiple nominations, mostly for expansion packs.

- The Ultima Online expansion, The Second Age, won the Online Role-Playing Game of the Year in 1999, and the Renaissance expansion was nominated for Massively Multiplayer/Persistent World Game of the Year in 2001.
- Asheron's Call won PC Adventure/Role-Playing Game of the Year in 2000, was nominated for Massively Multiplayer/Persistent World Game of the Year in 2001, and the expansion pack Dark Majesty was nominated in 2002.
- Diablo II won Computer Role-Playing Game of the Year in 2001, and the expansion pack Lord of Destruction was nominated in 2002.
- Baldur's Gate II: Shadows of Amn was nominated for Computer Role-Playing Game of the Year in 2001, and the expansion pack Throne of Bhaal won in 2002.
- The EverQuest expansions The Ruins of Kunark and Lost Dungeons of Norrath won Massively Multiplayer/Persistent World Game of the Year in 2001 and 2004, respectively.
- Dark Age of Camelot won Massively Multiplayer/Persistent World Game of the Year in 2002, and the expansion pack Shrouded Isles was nominated in 2003.
- Neverwinter Nights won Computer Role-Playing Game of the Year in 2003, the expansion pack Shadows of Undrentide was nominated in 2004, and the expansion pack Kingmaker won in 2005.
- Eve Online had four expansions nominated for Massively Multiplayer/Persistent World Game of the Year: Second Genesis (2004), Revelations (2007), Trinity (2008), and Quantum Rise (2009).
- World of Warcraft won Massively Multiplayer Game of the Year in 2005, and the expansion packs The Burning Crusade and Wrath of the Lich King won in 2008 and 2009, respectively. Since the award for Massively Multiplayer merged with Role-Playing, the other expansion packs that had been nominated were Cataclysm in 2011, Warlords of Draenor in 2015, Legion in 2017, and Dragonflight in 2023.
- City of Heroes was nominated for Massively Multiplayer Game of the Year in 2005, and the City of Villains expansion tied for winning the award the following year in 2006.
- The Final Fantasy XI expansion Chains of Promathia and compilation The Vana'diel Collection were nominated for Massively Multiplayer Game of the Year in 2005 and 2006, respectively.
- Guild Wars tied for Massively Multiplayer Game of the Year in 2006, and the Eye of the North expansion was nominated in 2008.
- Diablo III was nominated in 2013, and won in 2014.
- Persona 5 was nominated in 2018, and the enhanced edition, Persona 5 Royal, was nominated in 2021.
- Final Fantasy XIV expansion packs included Shadowbringers being nominated in 2020, and Endwalker winning in 2022.
- Cyberpunk 2077 was nominated in 2021, as well as the Phantom Liberty expansion in 2024.
- Elden Ring won the award in 2023, with the Shadow of the Erdtree expansion being nominated in 2025.

Star Wars: Knights of the Old Republic is the only game to win both console and computer RPG awards in the same year in 2004. Baldur's Gate is the only franchise to be nominated for and win both console and computer awards with different games in 2002: Baldur's Gate: Dark Alliance for console, and the Baldur's Gate II: Throne of Bhaal expansion pack for computer. The original Final Fantasy VII won Console Role-Playing Game of the Year in 1998, and Final Fantasy VII Remake won in 2021 with Final Fantasy VII Rebirth being nominated in 2025.

Franchises
Franchise	Nominations	Wins
Final Fantasy	15	5
Baldur's Gate	5	4
Warcraft	7	3
Mass Effect	3	3
Diablo	5	2
Fallout	5	2
Guild Wars	4	2
Star Wars	4	2
Dragon Age	3	2
The Elder Scrolls	3	2
Neverwinter Nights	3	2
EverQuest	2	2
Asheron's Call	4	1
Mario	3	1
Ultima	3	1
City of Heroes	2	1
Dark Souls	2	1
Dark Age of Camelot	2	1
Elden Ring	2	1
Monster Hunter	2	1
The Legend of Zelda	2	1
The Outer Worlds	2	1
Deus Ex	4	0
Eve Online	4	0
Pokémon	4	0
Dungeon Siege	3	0
Dragon Quest	3	0
Megami Tensei (Note: Persona is a spin-off series of the Megami Tensei franchise.)	3	0
Tales	3	0
The Witcher	3	0
Citizen Sleeper	2	0
Cyberpunk 2077	2	0
Dark Cloud	2	0
Divinity	2	0
Fable	2	0
Kingdom Hearts	2	0
Ni no Kuni	2	0
Pillars of Eternity	2	0
Persona	2	0
Phantasy Star	2	0
Suikoden	2	0
Wild Arms	2	0
Xeno	2	0
Yakuza/Like a Dragon	2	0
