= Neverwinter Nights (2002 video game) =

Dungeons & Dragons video game

- North American PC cover art
- Developer: BioWare
- Publisher: Infogrames (Note: Released under the Atari brand name. Mac OS X version published by MacSoft.)
- Director: Trent Oster
- Producer: Trent Oster
- Designers: Brent Knowles; James Ohlen
- Programmer: Scott Greig
- Artists: Marc Holmes; David Hibbeln
- Writers: David Gaider; Drew Karpyshyn; Lukas Kristjanson; Kevin Martens
- Composers: Jeremy Soule; Inon Zur (additional music)
- Series: Neverwinter Nights
- Engine: Aurora
- Platforms: Windows: Linux; Mac OS X; Nintendo Switch; PlayStation 4; Xbox One
- Release: June 18, 2002: Windows; NA: June 18, 2002; EU: June 28, 2002; AU: July 3, 2002; Linux; WW: June 19, 2003; Mac OS X; NA: July 30, 2003; EU: 2003; Enhanced Edition; Windows; WW: March 27, 2018; Switch, PS4, Xbox One; WW: December 3, 2019
- Genre: Role-playing
- Modes: Single-player, multiplayer

Neverwinter Nights is a role-playing video game developed by BioWare. Interplay Entertainment was originally set to publish the game, but financial difficulties led to it being taken over by Infogrames, who released the game under their Atari range of titles. It is the first installment in the Neverwinter Nights series, and was released for Microsoft Windows on June 18, 2002. BioWare later released a Linux client in June 2003, requiring a purchased copy of the game to play. MacSoft released a Mac OS X port in August 2003.

Neverwinter Nights is set in the fantasy world of the Forgotten Realms campaign setting, with the game mechanics based on the Dungeons & Dragons 3rd edition rules. The game engine was designed around an Internet-based model for running a massively multiplayer online game (MMOG), which would allow end users to host game servers. Up to 64 players could connect to a single server. The intent was to create a potentially infinite massively multiplayer game framework. This game was named after the original Neverwinter Nights online game, the first graphical massively multiplayer online role-playing game (MMORPG), which operated from 1991 to 1997 on AOL.

The original release of Neverwinter Nights includes the game engine, a game campaign that can be played as single player or in multiplayer mode, and on Windows releases, the Aurora toolset used for creating custom content that would run in the same engine. Three expansion packs were released for the game: Shadows of Undrentide in June 2003; Hordes of the Underdark in December 2003; and Kingmaker in November 2004. BioWare began selling premium modules through an online store in late 2004. The game's success led to a sequel, Neverwinter Nights 2, released on October 31, 2006.

== Development and release ==
The game was developed by 65 people. Development time was more than a year and the project had a multi-million dollar budget. The game was announced to use the Omen engine as a replacement for the Infinity engine which was not good enough for the new game.

BioWare intended to create a game system which emulated the interactions in a pen-and-paper version of Dungeons & Dragons including the role of Dungeon Master. They worked alongside the AD&D to ensure the game framework was faithful to the tabletop game.

A posting at the Neverwinter Nights 2 Vault on June 4, 2008 contained information from what appeared to be original Neverwinter Nights documentation. At the BioWare forums, Neverwinter lead designer Rob Bartel confirmed that the "series of excerpts from the game's design doc" were not a hoax. When asked if the plans were altered due to time constraints, Bartel referenced various legal difficulties that the company was working through.

The game was released for Windows in North America on June 18, 2002, in Europe on June 28, and in Australia on July 3. Sega released the game as its publisher on March 20, 2003. A Linux client for the game was made available on June 19, 2003. A Mac OS X port published by MacSoft was released in North America on July 30, 2003, and in Europe later the same year.

== Gameplay ==
A large end-game battle. The encounter is complete with dynamic graphical effects. In the lower left corner, the player console displays Dungeons & Dragons game mechanics behind the actions.

The original scenario supplied with Neverwinter Nights is the campaign. It comprises approximately sixty hours of gameplay. The gameplay centers on the development of a player character (PC) through adventuring, who ultimately becomes the hero of the story. The PC is tasked with defeating a powerful cult, collecting four reagents required to stop a plague, and thwarting an attack on the city of Neverwinter, located along the Sword Coast of Faerûn, in the Forgotten Realms campaign setting of Dungeons & Dragons. The first and final chapters of the campaign deal with the city of Neverwinter itself, but the lengthy mid-story requires the player to venture into the surrounding countryside and travel northward to the city of Luskan. Along the way, many optional side quests are made available.

As in the Dungeons & Dragons tabletop game, the first thing a player must do is create a new character. The game provides a set of ready-made characters, or the player may create one from scratch. A series of panels are presented for selection of the character's gender, race, character class, alignment, ability scores (such as strength and intelligence), specialized abilities called skills and feats, in-game appearance, and name. This process grants significant allowance for customization; one can be, for example, an outdoorsman (ranger) or a healer (cleric), then choose skills and feats that would work well with that class in the game.

Following a small prelude, there are four chapters in the original game, with each chapter following part of the general storyline. Within each chapter, there are many quests, subquests, and mini-storylines provided to the player. Depending on the specific quests completed, and the unique items kept, some storylines are continued throughout the entire game, such as the Henchman's or Aribeth's tales. Completing many of the side quests will give the player's character more experience and special items, making them improve more rapidly and continue to make the game easier as the player progresses. These improvements come in the form of levels earned through experience points, with each level providing the protagonist with a set of enhancements as selected by the player.

The game's mechanics are based on the Dungeons & Dragons 3rd edition rule set; the outcome of most actions, such as combat and skills usage, are randomly determined by dice rolls. For example, when a fighter attacks, the computer would digitally "roll" a 20-sided die (called a d20 in-game) to determine if he hits the target. On a success, another die is rolled to determine the damage dealt, with powerful weapons assigned to dice with a greater number of sides, due to their ability to do more damage. Although the outcome of nearly all actions is determined by dice rolls, the player does not see them, with the results calculated in the background. However, the player has the option to display the outcomes of these rolls. The player can control the game almost entirely via the mouse.

=== Multiplayer ===
A robust multiplayer component separates Neverwinter Nights from previous Dungeons & Dragons games, as this allows players to play on many different servers hosting games. Depending on hardware and bandwidth, each server can support up to ninety-six players on the same server application, plus Dungeon Masters (DM) to run the games, if desired. Neverwinter Nights game modules are run in a variety of genres and themes, including persistent worlds (which are similar to MUD), combat arenas (player versus player modules), whole servers dedicated to sexually oriented roleplay, and simple social gatherings similar to a chat room. BioWare requires that these persistent worlds be free of charge, primarily for reasons of copyright law.

Because Neverwinter Nights lacks a global chat function aside from the supported GameSpy, players typically join pickup games through the game's multiplayer interface, or schedule games in advance with friends. Matchmaking sites can facilitate scheduling of games, and the experience is much like traditional pen-and-paper role-playing games. Persistent worlds do this work for them by inviting players to visit their website and continue to roleplay there.

An important feature of Neverwinter Nights is the Dungeon Master Client: a tool that allows an individual to take the role of the Dungeon Master, who guides the players through the story and has complete control of the server. Previous games such as Vampire: The Masquerade – Redemption, based on the printed gamebooks by White Wolf Publishing, utilized this feature to a limited extent. When it was released, Neverwinter Nights was viewed as the first successful implementation of the feature. The DM Client allows players to participate in regular campaigns, while also allowing persistent world servers to flourish by permitting the DMs of those servers to take control of non-player characters (NPCs) in mid-game for added realism and flexibility. The Dungeon Master Client also permits the user to spawn and control masses of monsters and NPCs much in the same way as units would be controlled in a real-time strategy game.

=== Custom content ===
Neverwinter Nights ships with the Aurora toolset, which allows players to create custom modules for the game. These modules may take the form of online multiplayer worlds, single player adventures, character trainers or technology demos. Additionally, several third party utilities have further expanded the community's ability to create custom content for the game. By the end of 2002, there were over 1,000 custom adventures available.

Custom content creators are known as builders in the Neverwinter Nights community. The Aurora toolset allows builders to create map areas using a tile system; the appearance and surface textures of the area are defined by the area's selected tileset. Builders can overlay placeable objects onto areas, and use the built-in scripting language NWScript, which is based on the C programming language, to run cut scenes, quests, mini-games and conversations.

Third party utilities allow builders to create custom content for most aspects of the game, ranging from new playable races and character classes to new tilesets, monsters and equipment. Custom content is added to the game in the form of hakpaks. Builders have used the Aurora toolset in combination with hakpaks to create playing experiences beyond the scope of the original campaign. Additionally, the Aurora toolset has allowed for the creation of a number of ongoing persistent worlds modules.

Despite the game's age, the Neverwinter Nights custom content community remains active. The community, mostly centered on the Neverwinter Vault, has created over 4,000 modules for the game, among them, many award-winning adventures and series such as Dreamcatcher. The Aurora toolset is not available for the Linux and Macintosh versions of Neverwinter Nights. The open source project neveredit aims to port the toolset features to these platforms. The game's module-making legacy was continued by Neverwinter Nights 2.

== Plot ==
The story begins with the player character (PC), the protagonist of the story, being sent to recover four creatures (dryad, intellect devourer, yuan-ti, and cockatrice) known collectively as the "Waterdhavian creatures" under the guidance of Lady Aribeth de Tylmarande. The Waterdhavian creatures are needed to make a cure for the Wailing Death, a plague that is sweeping the city of Neverwinter and forcing a quarantine. With the help of Fenthick Moss, Aribeth's love interest, and Desther, Fenthick's friend, the PC is able to retrieve the creatures. As they collect the creatures, they are attacked by mysterious assassins from a cult that is behind the spreading of the plague.

As the cure is being made, Castle Neverwinter is attacked by the minions of Desther, who betrays the heroes. Desther takes the completed cure and escapes the castle, with the hero and Fenthick in pursuit. When they catch up to Desther, he surrenders after a short battle. Desther is sentenced to burn at the stake, and Fenthick, despite being unaware of Desther's true intentions, is sentenced to hang.

The protagonist meets up with Aribeth and Neverwinter's spymaster, Aarin Gend, to begin searching for the cult responsible for the plague and the attack on Neverwinter. The PC retrieves the diaries of dead cultists and letters from a person named Maugrim Korothir, which convince Aribeth that the cult's headquarters are in Luskan. Aribeth goes ahead to Luskan, and the hero follows after speaking once more to Gend.

After arriving in Luskan, the protagonist hears rumors that Aribeth has defected and joined the cultists. These fears are confirmed when she is found meeting with Maugrim and Morag, Queen of the reptilian Old Ones. They seek a group of magical relics called the Words of Power. The protagonist retrieves all of the Words of Power except for one held by the cult. The hero discovers that the Words open a portal to a pocket world inside the Source Stone, where Morag and the other Old Ones sealed themselves long ago to avoid extinction during a primordial ice age. The protagonist confronts Aribeth, and depending on how the meeting is handled, she either surrenders to the PC or they are forced to kill her. The hero battles Maugrim for the final Word, then uses the Words to enter the Source Stone and battle with Morag. After Morag's death, the protagonist escapes the Stone as the world inside it implodes.

== Reception ==
=== Sales ===
For the launch of Neverwinter Nights, publisher Infogrames shipped 1 million copies to stores, with half allocated to North America and the rest to international markets. In an experimental move, the company priced the game at $55, an increase over the $50 typical of computer games at the time. CNN Money columnist Chris Morris reported that "gamers complained loudly about" this decision. The game proceeded to sell 125,000 copies by June 27, after its release on the 18th. It debuted at #1 on The NPD Group's computer game sales chart during the June 16–22 period, and held the position for two weeks, before being displaced by Warcraft III: Reign of Chaos. However, Neverwinter Nights continued to place in the chart's top 10 consistently for its first three months of release. By July 23, the game's global sales had surpassed 200,000 units. NPD reported North American sales of 330,000 copies by late December, which brought in revenues of $18 million. It was ultimately the region's 11th-best-selling computer game of 2002.

Greg Zeschuk remarked in June 2003 that Neverwinter Nights had sold above 1 million copies, before the release of its first expansion pack. In the United States alone, the game sold 510,000 copies and earned $23.2 million by August 2006. At that time, Edge declared it the country's 26th-best-selling computer game released since January 2000. It also received a "Silver" sales award from the Entertainment and Leisure Software Publishers Association, which indicates sales of at least 100,000 copies in the United Kingdom. Combined global sales of Neverwinter Nights and its expansion packs surpassed 2.6 million units by early 2005; by August 2006, the games totaled 1.3 million sales in the United States alone. Discounting its expansions, the original Neverwinter Nights ultimately sold 2.2 million copies, as of 2007.

=== Critical reviews ===
Reception

Aggregate scores
Aggregator	Score
GameRankings	89%
Metacritic	91/100

Review scores
Publication	Score
AllGame	4.5/5
Game Informer	8.75/10
GamePro	4.5/5
GameSpot	9.2/10
GameSpy	91/100
GameZone	9.3/10
PC Gamer (US)	95/100
Gameplanet	4.5/5

Awards
Publication	Award
Electronic Entertainment Expo (E3) Game Critics Awards 2000	Best Role Playing Game, Best Online Multiplayer
E3 Game Critics Awards 2001	Best Role Playing Game
E3 Game Critics Awards 2002	Best Role Playing Game
Interactive Achievement Awards (2003)	Computer Role-Playing Game of the Year

In general, Neverwinter Nights was met with positive reviews, receiving "universal acclaim" according to Metacritic. GameSpot referred to it as "one of those exceedingly rare games that has a lot to offer virtually everyone, even if they aren't already into RPGs", and praised it for its campaign, its Aurora toolset, and its graphics. The publication later named it the best computer game of June 2002. PC Gamer US called it "a total package—a PC gaming classic for the ages", and said that its "storyline [is] as persuasive as any I’ve encountered in a fantasy roleplaying game".

Chris Chan of New Straits Times said, "Neverwinter Nights is every role-playing gamer's dream". Allgame found that the game's story was "humdrum" and "mediocre". Mark Meadows of The Wisconsin State Journal agreed, saying the game was too focused on technical details. Victor Godinez of Knight Ridder/Tribune News Service did not care for the turn-based combat system, preferring to have direct control. He also said the controls were difficult to use occasionally.

GamePro noted the game's graphics as being "gorgeous" and its sound as "untouchable", and GameZone likewise praised its visuals, specifically mentioning its combat animation and spell effects as being well done. GameSpy was not as impressed by the graphics, saying "The biggest, and arguably the only, glaring flaw in the game, is its graphics. You can tell that this game has been in development for five years[...]"; however, they praised its voice acting and music. Godinez agreed, and also liked the game's audio, noting in particular the scraps of conversation that can be heard in the background throughout the city.

Allgame praised Neverwinter Night's DM tools, calling the game's level creation options "impressive" and the multiplayer options "great". GamePro thought that Neverwinter Nights is the closest that any video game has come to accurately representing the full Dungeons & Dragons rules, a statement further reinforced by Greg Kasavin of GameSpot, who said that "Neverwinter Nights isn't the first Dungeons & Dragons game for the computer to make use of the pen-and-paper game's 3rd Edition rules, but it's the first to implement them so well".

GameZone said that the Aurora Toolset was one of the "best features" of the game. John Breeden II of The Washington Post said including the tool set was "smartest thing Bioware did". He went on to say that giving such tools to the players became more commonplace, but was a bold move at the time of the game's release. Chan commented, "you could use the Aurora tools to create a dream world".

Peter Suciu of Newsweek magazine called Neverwinter Nights "possibly the richest fantasy PC experience ever created." According to GameSpy, "Neverwinter's contribution to D&D gaming is always a hot topic and a source of argument."

=== Awards ===
During the 6th Annual Interactive Achievement Awards, Neverwinter Nights was awarded with "Computer Role-Playing Game of the Year" by the Academy of Interactive Arts & Sciences (AIAS); it also received a nomination for "Computer Game of the Year". The game also won role-playing game of the year awards from PC Gamer US and GameSpot. RPG Vault declared it "Product of the Year", while Computer Games Magazine ranked it the year's second-best computer game across all genres. The latter publication's editors wrote that the "single-player game is merely passable", but they highly praised Neverwinter Nights' content-creation tools, and argued that the game is "what computer role-playing games should have been all along".

The game won special awards for its technology from Computer Games, the Game Developers Choice Awards (GDCA) and RPG Vault, the latter two for its network programming and Aurora Neverwinter Toolset, respectively. The Aurora Neverwinter Toolset was also a nominee in the AIAS's "Computer Simulation Game of the Year" category. RPG Vault's staff hailed the tool as "an unprecedented combination of power, flexibility and ease of use."

Neverwinter Nights received further nominations in the AIAS's special categories for "Outstanding Innovation in Computer Gaming" and "Outstanding Achievement in Game Design", and in RPG Vault's categories for music and writing, but lost these to other titles. However, it did win RPG Vault's "Outstanding Achievement in Community Building" prize.

Neverwinter Nights was a runner-up for the "Role-Playing Game of the Year" awards of Computer Gaming World, IGN, GameSpy and RPG Vault, all of which went to The Elder Scrolls III: Morrowind. The editors of Computer Gaming World wrote that Neverwinter Nights "gave gamers a fabulous toolset for creating their own adventures—too bad the single-player campaign prompted a staffwide shrugging of shoulders." It was also nominated as the overall best computer game of 2002 by GameSpot, PC Gamer US and the AIAS, and as the year's best game on any platform by the GDCA. These prizes went variously to Warcraft III, Battlefield 1942 and Metroid Prime.

== Legacy ==
IGN ranked Neverwinter Nights No. 4 on their list of "The Top 11 Dungeons & Dragons Games of All Time" in 2014. Ian Williams of Paste rated the game #4 on his list of "The 10 Greatest Dungeons and Dragons Videogames" in 2015. The game has inspired a number of fan-made films made using machinima techniques of synchronizing video footage from a game to pre-recorded dialogue and other audio, such as BloodSpell, and Neverending Nights.

Since the original release of Neverwinter Nights, several in-game portraits have been modified in patches due to their having been copied from outside sources. In another instance, the Canadian Red Cross complained to BioWare about the appearance of the Red Cross symbol on the in-game item "Healer's Kit", as part of a long-running attempt to discourage outside usage of the symbol. This resulted in the Red Cross symbol being removed from the Healer's Kit through patches.

Star Wars: Knights of the Old Republic, a role-playing video game based in the Star Wars universe, was also released by BioWare using a modified version of the Aurora engine of Neverwinter Nights, called the Odyssey Engine. The sequel, Star Wars: Knights of the Old Republic II: The Sith Lords, also used it. Because of this, modders have been able to modify these games using some Neverwinter Nights modding tools. The Witcher, a role-playing video game by CD Projekt Red, is also based on the Aurora engine of Neverwinter Nights. BioWare used Neverwinter Nights and its toolset to develop prototypes and mock-ups of various areas and scenarios for Dragon Age: Origins.

=== Expansion packs and modules ===
Neverwinter Nights received an expansion pack, Neverwinter Nights: Shadows of Undrentide, in June 2003. Its story line concerns a student sent out to recover some stolen magical objects. The story begins in the Silver Marches, moving toward the desert of Anauroch and the old Netherese city of Undrentide. A second expansion Neverwinter Nights: Hordes of the Underdark was released in December 2003. The story continued where Shadows of Undrentide ended, with a character of at least 15th level, and led into the vast subterranean world known as the Underdark. The first chapter of the story took place in the Undermountain dungeon beneath the city of Waterdeep. Neverwinter Nights: Kingmaker was released in November 2004, and features three premium modules: the award-winning Kingmaker, Shadowguard, and Witch's Wake.

Atari and BioWare helped to promote and release free downloadable hakpaks, models, and tileset expansion packs, which greatly expanded the possibilities of mod-making. The Players Resource Consortium (PRC) was released in early December 2003, and is a group of hakpaks adding classes, races, skills, and spells to the game. The PRC has roughly three times the number of prestige classes the original game had. It also adds dozens of epic spells, and many normal spells that make better use of BioWare's Aurora engine. Psionic powers have also been included. The Community Expansion Pack (CEP), originally released in March 2004 (last updated in January 2017), is based on the Neverwinter Nights community's fan-made material. This freely downloadable expansion was compiled by members of the community. It combines a selection of previously released custom content into one group of hakpaks.

In late 2004, BioWare launched its online store and started selling what it called "premium modules" as part of its digital distribution program. This initiative was led by BioWare's Live Team Lead Designer, Rob Bartel. These smaller-scale adventures introduced new storylines and gameplay, and include new music and art that BioWare integrated into later patches to the core game. According to BioWare, the revenue generated by sales of the premium modules would be used to support their fan community and provide ongoing updates and improvements to the game. The modules that are sold in the BioWare store require an active Internet connection to play, even when played in single player mode. The modules in the Kingmaker expansion were stripped of this requirement, but are only available for Windows systems. The modules included with Neverwinter Nights Diamond Edition do not require Internet access to play. In August 2009, BioWare discontinued its selling of premium modules due to a request made by Atari.

On June 16, 2011, the Neverwinter Nights digital rights management (DRM) authentication server was temporarily taken down as a reaction by Electronic Arts to the Neverwinter Nights store being hacked and customer data stolen. Premium modules which were purchased via BioWare's store could not be played during that time because they could not connect to the server to validate the purchase, though DRM-free modules were unaffected. The modules Kingmaker, Shadowguard, and Witch's Wake were sold as part of the Diamond Edition package.

Premium modules include Neverwinter Nights: Kingmaker, BioWare's flagship premium module, which later received the Academy of Interactive Arts & Sciences "Computer Role-Playing Game of the Year" award. In the module's story, the hero must defeat the evil at the Keep of Cyan and win the throne. Others include Neverwinter Nights: ShadowGuard, created by community member Ben McJunkin; Neverwinter Nights: Witch's Wake, a remastered version of a module by Rob Bartel; Neverwinter Nights: Pirates of the Sword Coast; Neverwinter Nights: Infinite Dungeons, a BioWare module taking place in the Undermountain area below Waterdeep; and Neverwinter Nights: Wyvern Crown of Cormyr, which features fully ridable horses, flowing cloaks, tabards and long coats, a new prestige class (the Purple Dragon Knight), and extensive new art, creatures, and tilesets.

Premium modules were eventually discontinued. Three premium modules were known to be in development before cancellation. Two of them ended up being free downloads, while the third, a planned sequel to Witch's Wake, was never released. Hex Coda by Stefan Gagne, the first cancelled premium module, was released to Neverwinter Vault in May 2005. The story was a mix of fantasy and science fiction and involved the protagonist dealing with the machinations of a multinational corporation called Cathedral. A sequel was in development, but was cancelled.

In August 2006, Ossian Studios Inc., headed up by Alan Miranda, a former producer at BioWare, released the second canceled premium module to the Vault: Darkness over Daggerford. The story takes place in and around Daggerford and has been compared favorably to Baldur's Gate 2 in terms of its scope. Characters start at the 8th level. The module includes a cinematic intro (like the main campaign) and a world map. Darkness over Daggerford's status as a quasi-official expansion pack was supported by the next release of the team, this time a fully official one: Mysteries of Westgate for Neverwinter Nights 2.

=== Sequels ===
A sequel to Neverwinter Nights, Neverwinter Nights 2, was developed by Obsidian Entertainment, a company with a long history with BioWare. According to BioWare, the change of developer was due to BioWare's business with other titles, such as Mass Effect and Dragon Age: Origins. Neverwinter Nights 2 shipped in November 2006.

On August 23, 2010, Atari announced Cryptic Studios would be developing Neverwinter, an online role-playing game based on the book series of the same name by R.A. Salvatore. It is based on Wizards of the Coast's global property Dungeons & Dragons rules and feature the titular city Neverwinter. It was released in June 2013.

=== Educational usage ===
Neverwinter Nights has been used by colleges and universities for a variety of educational purposes. It has been used at West Nottinghamshire College in the United Kingdom as a means of delivering key skills and of showing IT designers how to understand the coding in the game. The Synthetic Worlds Initiative at Indiana University has used it as a basis for the creation of Arden: The World of Shakespeare, where Shakespeare's dramatic history of Richard III and The War of the Roses can be interactively explored. The game and the Aurora toolset were also used at Macquarie University in Australia.

The University of Alberta has offered a video game design course which uses Neverwinter Nights and the Aurora Toolset as the platform for teaching and course projects. The University of Minnesota has used the game to teach journalism students how to gather facts and information for news events with a modified modern setting for the game that involves interviewing witnesses and doing library research; in a modified game, students would work in pairs putting together a story about a train accident that causes a toxic chemical spill. Neverwinter Nights has also been used as an interface for some Moodle activity types.

=== Editions and re-releases ===
Atari released subsequent editions of the game following its first release in 2002. These editions are:

- Neverwinter Nights: Gold (2003), which includes Shadows of Undrentide
- Neverwinter Nights: Platinum (2004) (in Europe: Neverwinter Nights: Deluxe Edition), which includes both Shadows of Undrentide and Hordes of the Underdark
- Neverwinter Nights: Diamond (2005) (in Europe: Neverwinter Nights Deluxe: Special Edition), which includes everything in the Platinum edition plus the Kingmaker expansion pack
  - In 2010, the Diamond edition was licensed for online distribution to GOG.com.

Atari also re-released the game and both expansion packs in the following collections:

- Atari Collection: Rollenspiele (2005)
- Neverwinter Nights 2: Lawful Good Edition (2006)
- Neverwinter Nights 2: Chaotic Evil Edition (2006)
- Ultimate Dungeons & Dragons (2006); Rollenspiele: Deluxe Edition (2007)
- Neverwinter Nights 3-Pack (2007)
- Neverwinter Nights: The Complete Collection (2011)

Beamdog announced the upcoming release of Neverwinter Nights: Enhanced Edition on November 20, 2017. This version includes fixes made by the community since the last release, graphic improvements, premium modules, and the return of a multiplayer server list that was lost when GameSpy shut down. A digital deluxe version includes the soundtrack and the rest of the premium modules. A pre-release version was made available to purchase on November 21.

Neverwinter Nights: Enhanced Edition launched on Steam on March 27, 2018, and on Google Play for Android on December 4, 2018.

Skybound Games, a division of Skybound Entertainment, released Beamdog's remastered version for Nintendo Switch, PlayStation 4, and Xbox One on December 3, 2019.
