= Alan Miranda =

American computer game designer

Alan Miranda is a computer game designer.

== Career ==
Alan Miranda is a previous BioWare employee, who had worked on Dungeons & Dragons titles like Neverwinter Nights and Baldur's Gate II: Throne of Bhaal. In 2003, he left BioWare to form his own company, Ossian Studios, with his wife Elizabeth Starr. Miranda approached BioWare joint CEO Greg Zeschuk in 2005 to discuss the possibility of Ossian developing a "premium module" for Neverwinter Nights. Premium modules were adventures created for Neverwinter Nights by BioWare and other companies. BioWare had been given autonomy on the premium module process from the game's publisher, Atari, and Zeschuk approved Miranda's proposal. Miranda's initial draft of the project was a pirate-themed adventure in the Sword Coast, which happened to be the same idea that BioWare itself was creating a premium module for, Neverwinter Nights: Pirates of the Sword Coast. Miranda revised the concept and chose the Western Heartlands as the setting. Ossian estimated that a module on par with other large games like Kingmaker would take about four to five months. Pre-production on Darkness over Daggerford began in April 2005 and took a month and a half. Ossian went unsuccessfully through five designers in this stage. Choosing a designer required much of the time allocated for pre-production, and to compensate Ossian developers immediately began creating the game, fleshing out details as they went. In May 2006, Atari cancelled the premium module program, with no warning to developers of the current projects. Miranda and his team decided to finish the game anyway, and in August 2006 it was released free of charge on IGN's Neverwinter Nights Vault.
