= Neverwinter Nights: Darkness over Daggerford =

- Developer: Ossian Studios
- Publisher: Ossian Studios
- Designer: Alan Miranda
- Series: Neverwinter Nights
- Platforms: Microsoft Windows, Mac OS X, Linux
- Release: WW: August 16, 2006; Enhanced Edition: WW: June 1, 2018
- Genre: Role-playing
- Mode: Single-player

Darkness over Daggerford is a premium module for BioWare's Neverwinter Nights role-playing video game. It was released for digital distribution on August 16, 2006. Considered a user-made mod, the game was created by Canadian company Ossian Studios, headed by former BioWare employee Alan Miranda. It was remastered and released as an official premium module on June 1, 2018.

Daggerford was based on earlier Dungeons & Dragons video games like Baldur's Gate and Icewind Dale. It takes place in the Western Heartlands region of the Forgotten Realms campaign setting, in the town of Daggerford, near Waterdeep and Baldur's Gate. Completely a single-player experience, Daggerford's story revolves around the player character investigating the recent death of the town's leader.

Daggerford was originally conceived as a Neverwinter Nights premium module, which were products marketed through BioWare's website and supported by the game's publisher, Atari. Several months before the game's scheduled release, the premium module program was cancelled. Ossian decided to publish Daggerford anyway, and it was released as a free download on IGN's Neverwinter Vault, a community site for the Neverwinter Nights series.

For Neverwinter Nights: Enhanced Edition, Ossian Studios was hired to remaster Daggerford and finally release it as an official premium module.

== Gameplay ==
The world map in Darkness over Daggerford.

Since the game is an expansion of Neverwinter Nights, it uses the same engine, Aurora, and basic gameplay is similar. Features created specifically for Daggerford include a world map and a stronghold, which players can use as a base of operations and a source for sidequests. Players start the module at level 8. In addition to the main storyline of the game, there are numerous sidequests that can be undertaken for a variety of rewards.

== Plot ==
The intro of the game tells the player about the recent events in city of Daggerford. Pwyll Greatshout, the duke of Daggerford, died during strange circumstances. To maintain stability, a new leader was chosen: Baron Matagar Bugo, who promises the citizens to make Daggerford a new trading giant like Waterdeep. In the meantime, raider attacks on caravans become too often, and strange disappearings of cattle make people believe that hard times wait ahead.

The game begins with players working as freelance adventurers escorting a caravan from Waterdeep to Daggerford. Along the way, the caravan is attacked by a mysterious group and one of the player's party members, Talarenne, is kidnapped. The player soon discovers that Talarenne was mistaken for an agent of Waterdeep who came to the city in order to find out the truth about Pwyll Greatshout's death and the current political situation. The player decides to aid the agent.

The rest of the story follows the player character's efforts to rescue the missing party member and find the truth about what is going on around Daggerford. Gradually, an evil plot by Zhentarim is uncovered, and player has to do everything to stop it from fruition, or the city might be taken over... or even destroyed.

== Development ==
Alan Miranda was a previous employee of BioWare and had worked on other Dungeons & Dragons titles like Neverwinter Nights and Baldur's Gate II: Throne of Bhaal. In 2003, he left BioWare to form his own company, Ossian Studios, with his wife, Elizabeth Starr. Miranda approached BioWare joint CEO Greg Zeschuk in 2005 to discuss the possibility of Ossian developing a "premium module" for Neverwinter Nights. Premium modules were adventures created for Neverwinter Nights by BioWare and other companies. BioWare had been given autonomy on the premium module process from the game's publisher, Atari, and Zeschuk approved Miranda's proposal. Miranda's initial draft of the project was a pirate-themed adventure in the Sword Coast, which happened to be the same idea that BioWare itself was creating a premium module for, called Neverwinter Nights: Pirates of the Sword Coast. Miranda revised the concept and chose the Western Heartlands as the setting.

A portion of the city of Daggerford, being created by Ossian designers using Neverwinter Night's toolset.

Ossian began putting together the team for the module and decided to hire prominent amateur modders from the Neverwinter Nights fan community. The team set out to create a premium module that was ultimately to be as large as an expansion pack, with a large number of sidequests and a focus on exploration, like Baldur's Gate. Early on, the team decided to focus on the creation of a world map system for Daggerford, as well as a stronghold system that players could use as a customizable home and base.

Ossian estimated that a module on par with other large games like Kingmaker would take four to five months to develop. Pre-production on Daggerford began in April 2005 and took a month and a half. Ossian went through five designers in this stage, none of whom were successful. Choosing a designer required much of the time allocated for pre-production, and to compensate, Ossian developers immediately began creating the game, fleshing out details as they went. In order to keep in line with the exploration spirit of Baldur's Gate, Ossian hired designers specifically for the game's sidequests. The world map system in particular posed problems to designers, who stated that "the toolset really wasn't made to do what we wanted it to do." In addition, only Miranda and his wife worked in a brick and mortar building—most of the game's design was coordinated online using Skype. The production of Daggerford took longer than Ossian had anticipated, and in February 2006, BioWare's Live Team Lead Designer Rob Bartel offered the studio advice on their module. The next month, BioWare inspected the game and approved it for content completion.

In May 2006, Atari cancelled the premium module program, with no warning to developers of the current projects. Miranda and his team decided to finish the game anyway, and in August 2006 it was released free of charge on IGN's Neverwinter Nights Vault. Despite the game being self-funded, the cancellation of the premium module program was "more than a little disappointing", according to Miranda. In July 2006, BioWare and Atari decided to release one of the other modules that had been cancelled, Wyvern Crown of Cormyr, which Miranda described as "perplexing."

== Reception ==
Darkness over Daggerford surpassed 25,000 downloads in five weeks, a higher number than that recorded for previous Neverwinter Nights Vault's Module of the Year winners. The game went on to win the site's Reviewer Award, a Gold Award for the second-best module of 2006, and an entry in their Hall of Fame, which collects the highest-rated and most popular modules. It also won the Best RPG Mod award at the Independent Games Festival in 2007.
