= Neverwinter Nights =

Dungeons & Dragons-based video game series

- Genre: Role-playing video game
- Developers: BioWare, Obsidian Entertainment
- Publisher: Atari (formerly Infogrames)
- Platforms: Microsoft Windows, Mac OS X, Linux, iOS, Android, Nintendo Switch, PlayStation 4, Xbox One
- First release: Neverwinter Nights; June 18, 2002
- Latest release: Neverwinter Nights 2: Enhanced Edition; July 15, 2025

Neverwinter Nights is a series of video games developed by BioWare and Obsidian Entertainment, based on the Forgotten Realms campaign setting of the Dungeons & Dragons role-playing game. Aside from also being set around the city Neverwinter, it is unrelated to both the 1991 Neverwinter Nights online game and the 2013 online game called Neverwinter.

== Overview ==
The Neverwinter Nights series take place primarily in the city of Neverwinter, located in the Sword Coast region of the fictional land of Faerûn. Also commonly referred to as the City of Skilled Hands, Neverwinter grew from a multi-racial settlement named Eigersstor founded several hundred years prior to the start of Neverwinter Nights. At the time the first game takes place, the city of Neverwinter was beset by a magical plague named the Wailing Death, whereas in the second game the city is threatened by an invasion from its ancient enemy named the King of Shadows.

== Gameplay ==
The Neverwinter Nights series is a franchise of role-playing games. The systems of the games are based on the rules of Dungeons & Dragons, a table-top role-playing game originally developed by TSR, Inc. Both Neverwinter Nights and Neverwinter Nights 2 contain three game modes: a default campaign, a multiplayer mode, and custom contents.

== Campaign ==
Both Neverwinter Nights and Neverwinter Nights 2 include a default campaign, which focus on the development of the player character through a series of distinct acts. In addition to the main story, the player also has the opportunity to undertake a variety of side quests, some of which form storylines that span the entire game. The player has the ability to make key choices in specific quests that can affect combat encounters, key plot points, and the outcome of the overarching story.

Before the player can begin the campaign, they must first create a new character through the game's character creation interface. The player may customize a new character from scratch, or select one of the pre-set characters provided by the games. If the player chooses to create a new character, they are then guided through a series of choices about their character, including race, class and appearance. Some of the choices such as gender and appearance are purely cosmetic, whereas others such as race and class affect how the player character fights and what abilities they have access to.

=== Custom content ===
In addition to the base campaign and the multiplayer mode, both Neverwinter Nights and Neverwinter Nights 2 also included sets of software development tools which allow the players to create custom campaigns which they can then share with other players. Neverwinter Nights shipped with the Aurora Toolset, while Neverwinter Nights 2 shipped with the Electron Toolset, which was completely rewritten by Bioware using the C# programming language.

== Reception ==
The first installment in the series, Neverwinter Nights, was generally well received according to review aggregator Metacritic, which gave it a score of 91/100 based on 34 critic reviews and a score of 8.1/10 based on 608 user reviews. Greg Kasavin of GameSpot praised the game's accessibility, calling it "one of those exceedingly rare games that has a lot to offer virtually everyone, even if they aren't already into RPGs". Gamezone appreciated the game's graphic and sound design, and that "the musical score foreshadows game action (the music picks up in intensity when combat looms), and is well done". Allgame reviewer Mark Hoogland commended the Aurora toolset shipped with Neverwinter Nights, calling the breadth of level, story, environment, and module creation options "impressive". Eurogamer reviewer Gestalt was less convinced, criticising the single-player campaign's emphasis on combat encounters over "actual roleplaying", but was optimistic that the game's mod support will give it longevity.

The game series was praised for its customizable player character, including gender, as well as its non-player characters, which Kotaku editor Mary Kenney described as "fun, flawed and downright weird", like paladin Lady Aribeth de Tylmarande, kobold bard Deekin Scalesinger and writer and trouble seeker Volothamp Geddarm.

== Legacy ==
The Neverwinter Nights series has been adopted by a number of educators for use in the classroom. University of Alberta's Professor Mike Carbonara and colleagues made use of the Aurora Toolset to develop an "economics game" aimed at teaching the concepts of fixed price commerce, mark up, and supply and demand. Squire & Jenkins at MIT Education Arcade created the multiplayer game Revolution, which allows players to roleplay characters with different dispositions and political views in 1770s colonial Williamsburg, with an aim to improve the student's understanding of the American Revolution. In 2005, researchers Nora Paul and Kathleen A. Hansen designed a custom module for journalism students; players took on the role of a journalist investigating a train derailment in the fictional American town named Harperville, during which they must investigate and analyse multiple sources.

== Games ==
Neverwinter Nights Series
Title	Release	Platforms	Additional Info
Neverwinter Nights	2002	Windows, Mac, Linux	
Neverwinter Nights: Shadows of Undrentide	2003	Windows, Mac, Linux	expansion pack
Neverwinter Nights: Hordes of the Underdark	2003	Windows, Mac, Linux	expansion pack
Neverwinter Nights: Kingmaker	2004	Windows	premium module* (requires Hordes of the Underdark)
Neverwinter Nights: Pirates of the Sword Coast	2005	Windows, Mac, Linux	premium module*
Neverwinter Nights: Infinite Dungeons	2006	Windows, Mac, Linux	premium module*
Neverwinter Nights: Darkness over Daggerford	2006	Windows, Mac, Linux	premium module*
Neverwinter Nights: Wyvern Crown of Cormyr	2006	Windows, Mac, Linux	premium module*
Neverwinter Nights 2	2006	Windows, Mac	
Neverwinter Nights 2: Mask of the Betrayer	2007	Windows	expansion pack
Neverwinter Nights 2: Storm of Zehir	2008	Windows	expansion pack
Neverwinter Nights 2: Mysteries of Westgate	2009	Windows	adventure pack**
Neverwinter Nights: Tyrants of the Moonsea	2019	Windows, Mac, Linux	premium module*
Neverwinter Nights: Dark Dreams of Furiae	2020	Windows, Mac, Linux	premium module*
Neverwinter Nights: Doom of Icewind Dale	2025	Windows, Mac, Linux	premium module*

- A "premium module" is a small-scale, stand-alone adventure.
- An "adventure pack" is similar to the first game's premium modules.
