= Brent Knowles =

Canadian video game designer

- Born: Canadian
- Education: University of Alberta
- Occupation: Video game designer

Brent Knowles is a writer, programmer, and game designer currently working at Beamdog. He worked at the role-playing game studio BioWare (Baldur's Gate 2, Neverwinter Nights, Jade Empire, Dragon Age) for ten years, during most of which he was a Lead Designer/Creative Director.

As a designer, he feels that party control and tactical combats should be huge factors in a role playing game. Dragon Age II's departure from that made him realize that he would not be satisfied with what it would be.

Brent eventually left BioWare in September 2009, to pursue writing. He has been published in a variety of magazines including Neo-Opsis, Not One of Us, On Spec, Perihelion Science Fiction, Tales of the Talisman and Through Blood and Iron. He has had articles published in Dragon Magazine and Pyramid. In 2021, he wrote a Dungeons & Dragons 5th edition sourcebook Raiders of the Serpent Sea.

== Works ==
- Baldur's Gate II: Shadows of Amn (2000, designer)
- Neverwinter Nights (2002, lead designer)
- Jade Empire (2005, technical designer)
- Dragon Age: Origins (2009, lead designer)
- Planescape: Torment: Enhanced Edition (2017, production)
- Raiders of the Serpent Sea (2021, writer)
