= Party (role-playing games) =

Group of characters in role-playing video games

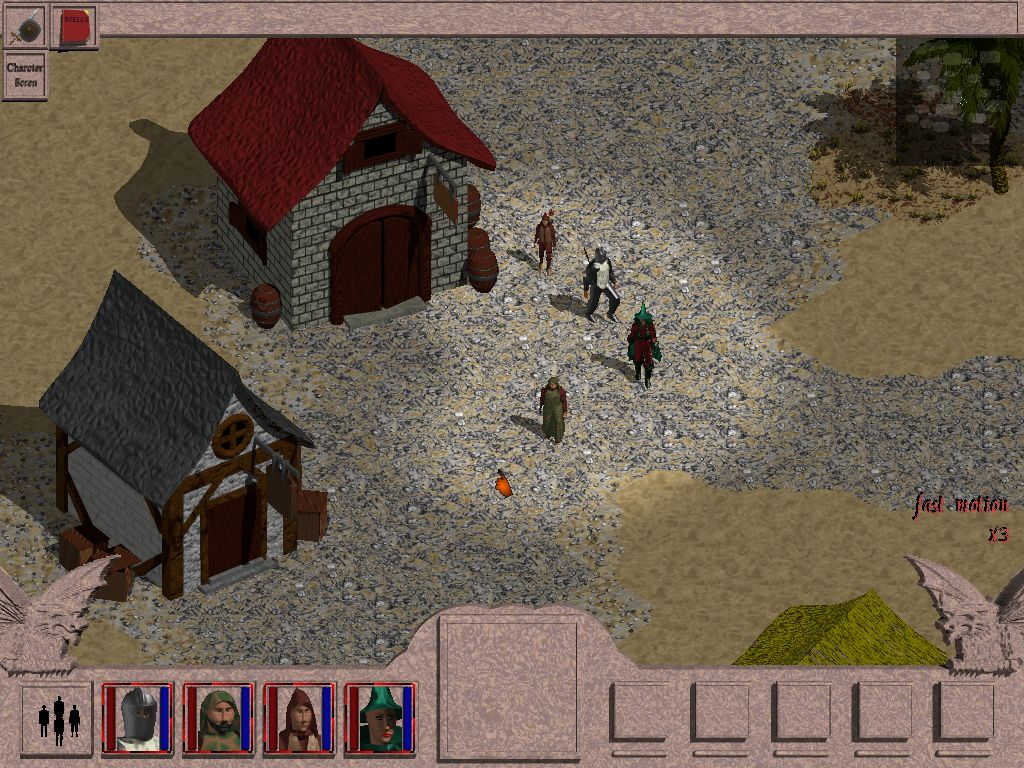
A party of adventurers venturing forth in Tales of Trolls & Treasures

A party is a group of characters adventuring together in a role-playing game. In tabletop role-playing, a party is composed of a group of player characters, occasionally with the addition of non-player character allies controlled by those players or by the gamemaster. In computer games, the relationship between the party and the players varies considerably. Online role-playing games parties often comprise player-controlled characters, as in tabletop games, except that the non-player allies are always controlled to a lesser or greater extent by the computer AI. In single-player computer games, the player generally controls all party members to a varying degree.

== Party role in gameplay ==
Resource management is a crucial part of role-playing games, and any player-controlled character, whether they can participate in combat or not, are always useful if they have the ability to carry heavy or bulky items. Non-player characters or alternative player-controlled characters used by the player with only this purpose in mind are called mules. Usually, however, and exclusively in tabletop and single-player games, party members are valued for their tactical or story potential.
