= Neverwinter Nights: Hordes of the Underdark =

- Developer: BioWare (Note: Enhanced Edition published by Beamdog.)
- Publisher: Atari (Note: Mac OS X port published by MacSoft. Enhanced Edition published by Skybound Games.)
- Director: Trent Oster
- Producer: Trent Oster
- Designer: Brent Knowles
- Writer: David Gaider
- Composer: Jeremy Soule
- Series: Neverwinter Nights
- Engine: Aurora
- Platforms: Windows: Linux; Mac OS X; Nintendo Switch; PlayStation 4; Xbox One
- Release: December 2, 2003: Windows; NA: December 2, 2003; EU: December 5, 2003; AU: December 12, 2003; Linux; WW: December 17, 2003; Mac OS X; NA: August 11, 2004; Switch, PS4, Xbox One; WW: December 3, 2019
- Genre: Role-playing
- Modes: Single-player, multiplayer

Neverwinter Nights: Hordes of the Underdark is an expansion pack for the role-playing video game Neverwinter Nights produced by BioWare and published by Atari. The follow-up to the Shadows of Undrentide expansion, Hordes of the Underdark adds a campaign, prestige classes, and other features. The Windows version also includes new scripting options for the Aurora toolkit.

== Gameplay ==
Hordes of the Underdark includes six new prestige classes: Pale Master, Shifter, Weapon Master, Champion of Torm, Red Dragon Disciple, and Dwarven Defender. The game also adds the ability to hire two henchman at once and increases the maximum attainable character level to 40.

== Plot ==
Hordes of the Underdark continues the story of Shadows of Undrentide. While in the plane of shadows, the player character finds an artifact called the Relic of the Reaper, that transports them to the Realm of the Reaper if they are mortally wounded, preventing them from actually dying. The player character escapes the plane of shadows, and stays for a while in Waterdeep. Soon, it is discovered that the drow, residents of the Underdark, are using the Undermountain under Waterdeep in an attempt to invade the surface world. Since the Undermountain is supposed to belong to the wizard Halaster, who hates the drow, an ex-adventurer named Durnan asks the player character to investigate.

With the help of a good drow named Nathyrra, the player character finds Halaster imprisoned by the drow. Upon being freed, Halaster informs the player character that the drow queen, the Valsharess, wishes to rule both the Underdark and the surface. He then asks the player character to kill the Valsharess, placing a geas on the player and his allies to ensure that they obey. The player character is then taken to the city of Lith My'athar, populated by good drow, where the player is given more information. The player character is told that the Valsharess has made alliances with various races of the Underdark, and has somehow enslaved the archdevil Mephistopheles. After forming alliance with other nearby races of the Underdark, the player is approached by the Valsharess in a dream in order to turn the player to her cause. Afterwards, she attacks Lith My’athar, and with help from the player character, they either are able to push her armies back to her lair, or the good drow of Lith My'athar are slaughtered. The player character is then captured by Mephistopheles and placed in a cage in the Valsharess's throne room (if fighting on behalf of Lith My'athar), or brought there by invitation (if he or she betrayed Lith My'athar to the Valsharess). Either way, the Valsharess soon turns on the player character and orders Mephistopheles to kill him or her. The archdevil instead releases the player character, who must then fight and kill the Valsharess. Mephistopheles then informs the player character that he intends to use the armies of the Valsharess to conquer the surface world and turn it into another hell. He then kills the player character so they cannot stop him.

The Relic of the Reaper transports the player character to the Realm of the Reaper, where he/she discovers that the Reaper is under orders from Mephistopheles to keep the player character there. He cannot go against this order, because Mephistopheles knows his true name, giving Mephistopheles complete control over the Reaper. The player character enters Cania, one of the levels of Baator and eventually learns the Reaper's name from the Knower of Names, a being who knows all beings' true names, and is taken to Waterdeep, where the forces of Mephistopheles have already arrived. When the character confronts the devil, Mephistopheles attempts to persuade the player's allies to his cause, before the final battle. Afterward, an epilogue is given for all of the player's companions who survive.

== Release ==
Hordes of the Underdark was released in North America for Windows on December 2, in the United Kingdom on December 5, and in Australia on December 12. It was also made available for Linux and Mac OS X on December 17, 2003. The game was released in proper for Mac OS X through a Mac-specific installer via publisher MacSoft on August 11, 2004. Publisher Sega released the game in Japan on September 23, 2004. An enhanced edition of the base game developed by Beamdog and published by Skybound Games featuring several modules including the Hordes of the Underdark expansion was released for Nintendo Switch, PlayStation 4, and Xbox One on December 3, 2019.

== Reception ==
Reception

Aggregate scores
| Aggregator | Score |
|---|---|
| GameRankings | 84% |
| Metacritic | 84/100 |

Review score
| Publication | Score |
|---|---|
| GameSpot | 8.2/10 |

Hordes of the Underdark received generally positive reviews. GameSpot reviewer Andrew Park called it "a solid expansion pack that adds a substantial single player campaign and interesting new options for multiplayer enthusiasts". According to GameSpy: "After the competent, but ultimately pedestrian outing that was Shadows of Undrentide, BioWare came roaring back with this stellar expansion". Chris Chan of New Straits Times thought the graphics were good, but that they suffered from performance problems due when many effects occurred simultaneously. He also took issue with the pathfinding for characters, and found the transition from first person to third person jarring. He said he expected more from the third part of the game's story, and while he enjoyed the game, he felt it was not BioWare's best work. Ure Paul of mania.com comments: "On an overall note, Hordes of the Underdark offers a considerably more rewarding experience than the Shadows of Undrentide and, therefore, deserves an honorable place in your RPG collection. It presents enough improvements to the NWN franchise to satisfy its ever-growing community of devoted players. After you're done, you'll most probably get the incentive to try it again with another new prestige class".

Hordes of the Underdark was a runner-up for Computer Games Magazine's "Expansion of the Year" award, which ultimately went to EverQuest: Lost Dungeons of Norrath.
