= John R. Taylor III =

American video game designer

John R. Taylor III (born January 13, 1957) is an American computer game designer, serial entrepreneur and massively multiplayer online game pioneer. He is a co-founder (with his University of Virginia classmate Kelton Flinn) of the game company Kesmai, which they founded in 1981. In 2011, Taylor was awarded the Online Game Legend Award by the Computer Game Developers Association.

== Game development and career history ==
=== Early career ===
In the late 1970s Taylor co-founded the Charlottesville, VA-based company Amber Electronics to design and build high end audio equipment for the consumer audiophile market. The business was sold and as of 2012, Amber Electronics operates in Australia. After Amber Electronics, Taylor spent five years at General Electric’s Industrial Electronics Development Lab, where he developed test systems for Computer Numerical Controls and motion control systems for advanced robotics.

=== Founding of Kesmai ===
In 1981, along with Dr. Kelton Flinn, Taylor founded Kesmai, the oldest US online multiplayer game company. The name Kesmai was generated from an auto-name generation program, while they were trying to name the island featured in Kesmai's first online role playing game. In 1982, the company was incorporated and Taylor and Flinn decided to name the company Kesmai as well. Taylor and Dr. Flinn's efforts demonstrated the commercial viability of the online game industry.

Taylor was instrumental in pioneering the design of text-based MUDs and role-playing games as well as the first multiplayer flight simulation game with a graphical interface - Air Warrior. He, along with Dr. Flinn also designed and developed a massively online gaming enabling technology called ARIES. Taylor expanded the business into the publishing of third party online games via distribution agreements with U.S., Japanese and European online providers. Kesmai's major titles include:

- MegaWars III (1983) — MegaWars III was the first game Kesmai published for CompuServe in 1983. Ironically, the reason they wanted to go to CompuServe was to have enough computation power to do Island of Kesmai, but it proved too computationally expensive. Consequently, MegaWars III was developed. MegaWars III, was an adaptation of a game called "S". Another irony: Not one of the MegaWars games are related to each other except by name; the original was based on the old university mainframe game DECWAR.
- Island of Kesmai (1985) — The rewrite of Flinn and Taylor's old text action adventure game went live at the end of 1985 after a long internal test cycle. It cost $6 an hour at 300 baud (the slow dial-up modems of the day), $12 for 1200 baud (the fast dial-up modems).
- Stellar Warrior (1985) — This rewrite of Mega Wars III introduced substantially simplified game play to expand its potential audience, and debuted on the GEnie online service the same day that Islands of Kesmai went live on CompuServe.
- Air Warrior (1986) — This game, offered on GEnie, is a key milestone in the history of computer games because it was the first commercial multiplayer online game to add graphics, displaying a 3D airplane dogfight environment. The original game was developed for the Apple Macintosh, and was followed by Amiga and Atari ST versions; the IBM PC version debuted in 1987. In another major innovation, Kesmai combined Mac, Amiga, Atari ST, and IBM PC players all in the same game, flying against each other.
- Multiplayer BattleTech: EGA (1991) — This title takes the Air Warrior concept to a futuristic land-based combat using heavily armed giant robots called Mechs. The game was very popular with players who fought for supremacy over the BattleTech universe. The game was technologically challenging for computers at the time due to the need for the computer to draw more terrain than it needed to draw when planes are flying in the air where much of the background is plain blue sky.

=== News Corporation and Electronic Arts ===
In 1994, Taylor negotiated the sale of Kesmai Corporation to Rupert Murdoch's News Corporation. Taylor remained at News Corporation for six years and was instrumental in developing Kesmai's GameStorm, a pay-for-play web based gaming service. News Corporation sold its online game business to Electronic Arts where Taylor was General Manager of EA Virginia and also Chief Production Officer for EA.com.

=== Castle Hill Studios and Video Gaming Technologies, Inc. ===
In 2001, Taylor co-founded Castle Hill Studios in 2001, a game development and technology company. Castle Hill worked with Microsoft, Electronic Arts and others to develop online gaming concepts and designs based on top-rated television, movie and gaming properties. In 2003, Taylor joined Video Gaming Technologies, a Class II casino gaming company, as Vice President of Engineering. He returned to Castle Hill in 2010 and now develops and manages intellectual properties for gaming systems.

== Personal life ==
Taylor graduated from the University of Virginia in 1980 with a Bachelor of Science in Electrical Engineering with Distinction and a Bachelor of Science in Computer Science with Distinction. He received a master's in Computer Science from the university in 1985.

In October 2011, Taylor was awarded the Online Game Legend Award by the Computer Game Developers Association.

Taylor is active in his community and has been involved in the Boy Scouts of America since 1998. He was awarded the Silver Beaver Award by the Virginia Headwaters Council (formerly Stonewall Jackson Council).
