= Gordon Walton =

American video gaming executive

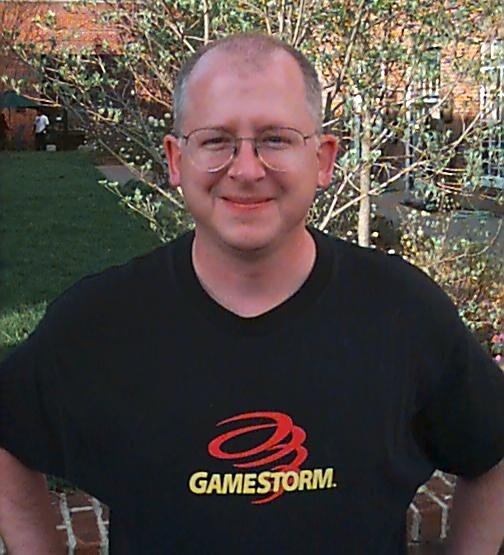
Gordon Walton at Kesmai in 1998

(Conrad) Gordon Walton, Jr. (born 1956) is an American video game developer and executive producer who has worked with many North American online game companies, from Maxis to Electronic Arts to Sony Online to BioWare. Since 1977 he has personally developed over thirty games, and overseen development of hundreds more, working as a producer, vice-president or executive producer. He is currently Executive Producer of the Kickstarter-backed MMORPG Crowfall.

== Biography ==
Walton was born in 1956, in Houston, Texas, to Conrad G. Walton, Sr., an architect, and Rilda Akin, an artist. Roberta Agnes (Robin) Hensley and Evelyn Coleman (Eve) Lowey are his siblings. He attended Spring Woods High School in Houston, and then enlisted in the U.S. Army from 1974 to 1977, attaining the rank of Sergeant. He was stationed at Fort Ord, Fort Gordon, Fort Hood, Fort Chaffee, and Kaiserslautern, Germany. In 1977 he left the army to enroll at Texas A&M University, and continued serving in the U.S. National Guard until 1979. In 1981, he received his BS degree in computer science. From 1990 to 1992 he also served briefly in the US Army Reserve.

== Game developer ==
He played his first computer game in 1977 on the PLATO system, and published his first computer game, Trek-X, in 1978 on the Commodore PET 2001. In 1984, he co-founded Applied Computing (later called Digital Illusions) with Don Gilman, and he was development manager for both Three-Sixty Pacific and Konami of America, Inc.

Though his work had been exclusively in the single-player game industry up until that point, in 1995 he joined the growing online game industry, managing games such as Air Warrior and Multiplayer Battletech at Kesmai. After Kesmai, Walton moved on to managing Ultima Online at Origin Systems, and then at Sony Online Entertainment in Austin, he worked on Star Wars Galaxies. At Maxis, he was an executive producer on The Sims Online. He worked on the MMOG Star Wars: The Old Republic at BioWare's studio in Austin until January 2011. He was last employed at the social gaming company Playdom and started his own company in 2013.

He is a frequent speaker at industry conferences such as E3, GDC, and the Austin Games Conference, and attained fame in 2003 for a talk entitled, "Ten Great Reasons You Don't want to Make a Massively Multiplayer Game." He is also active in the Academy of Interactive Arts & Sciences and IGDA, and has been on the steering committee of the IGDA's Online Games SIG. He is on the advisory boards for the Full Sail University, University of Texas at Austin, and Austin Community College Game Programs, while informally advising other educational programs.

Walton currently lives in Austin, Texas with his wife, Laura Ann Miskines Walton, and children John and Katherine.

== Selected projects ==
The following is a brief list of games which Walton either managed, produced, or developed:

- Crowfall (2021), ArtCraft
- Star Wars: The Old Republic (2011), BioWare
- Star Wars: Galaxies - Jump to Light Speed (2004), LucasArts
- The Sims (2003), Electronic Arts Inc.
- The Sims Online (2002), Electronic Arts Inc.
- Ultima Online: Third Dawn (2001), Electronic Arts Inc.
- Ultima Online: Renaissance (2000), Electronic Arts Inc.
- Air Warrior II (1997), iEntertainment Network
- Air Warrior III (1997), iEntertainment Network
- Harpoon Classic '97 (1996), iEntertainment Network
- Harpoon (1989), Three Sixty Pacific
- PT-109 (1987), Spectrum Holobyte, Inc.
- Sub Battle Simulator (1987), Epyx, Inc.
- Orbiter (1986), Spectrum Holobyte, Inc.
- Reader Rabbit
- NFL Challenge, (1987) XOr
- The Playroom
