= Kelton Flinn =

American computer game designer

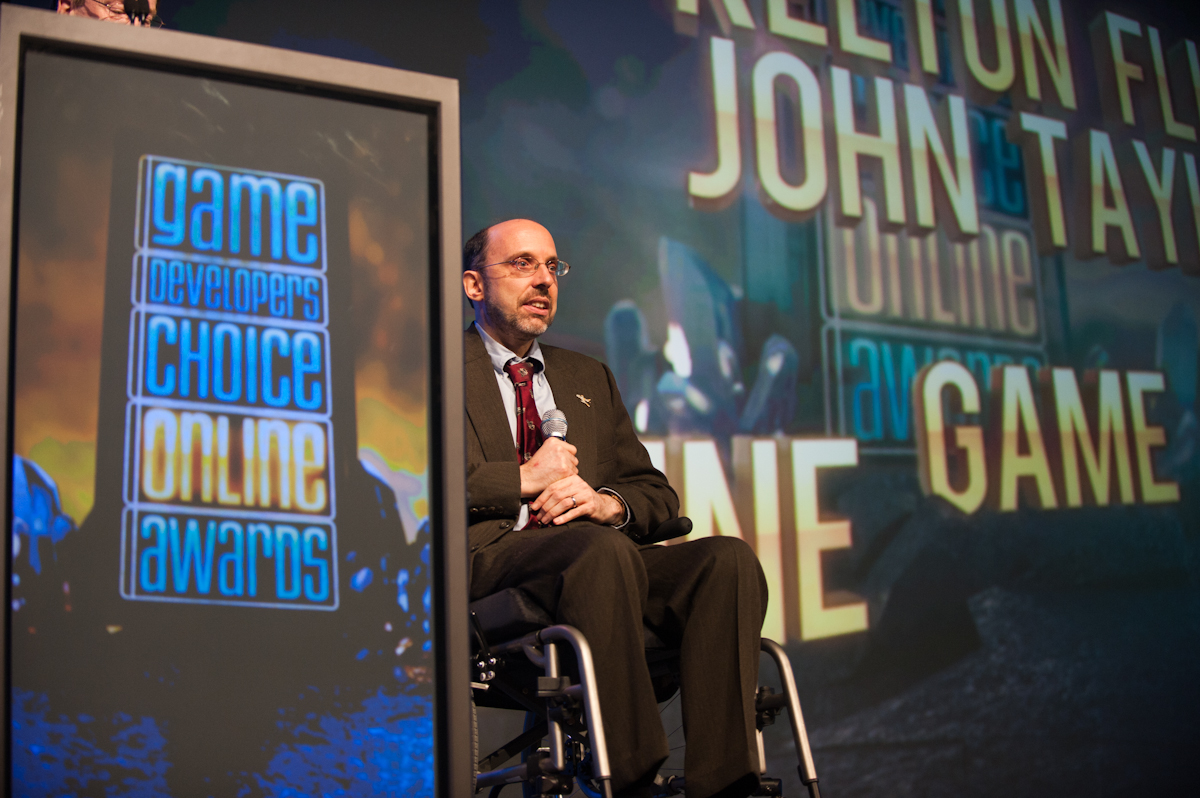
Kelton Flinn at the Game Developers Choice Online Awards in 2011.

Kelton Flinn is an American computer game designer who is a major pioneer in online games. He is a co-founder (with his University of Virginia classmate John Taylor) of the seminal online game company Kesmai, which they began in 1982. His best known title is the first graphical multi-player online game offered by a major service, Air Warrior (1987).

== 1970s university mainframe games ==
Like Marc Blank, Will Crowther, Don Daglow and Gregory Yob, Flinn and Taylor were key innovators in the 1970s university gaming culture, where students played for free on college mainframe computers. Flinn took advantage of his pursuit of an advanced degree (a PhD in applied mathematics) to build a long series of games across his undergraduate and graduate school career. Most students lost all access to computers after graduation in the days before personal computers were invented, but Flinn's extended years of study gave him the chance to build a large body of major works.

Key games Flinn and Taylor created during this time include:

- Air (1977–1979) — a text air combat game that foreshadowed Air Warrior. The first version was created in 1977 and worked on through 1979. As Flinn has said: "If Air Warrior was a primate swinging in the trees, AIR was the text-based amoeba crawling on the ocean floor. But it was quasi-real time, multi-player, and attempted to render 3-D on the terminal using ASCII graphics. It was an acquired taste."
- S — a multi-player space colonization and combat game (1979). Flinn and Taylor wrote the game over their summer vacations at the University of Virginia. MegaWars III would be based on S after they founded Kesmai.
- Dungeons of Kesmai (1980) — a text adventure game with very little puzzle solving and an emphasis on exploration and combat. The game's name would also appear later as a text-based online adventure from Kesmai. Flinn and Taylor had seen and played Adventure and Zork, but chose to emphasize action in their title, again written during their summer vacations as college students.
- Island of Kesmai (1981) — expands on their gaming system, in this case trying to use all the power of the university's new VAX computer. They added rich text descriptions to the ASCII graphic maps and minimal combat feedback text of their prior games. The university reported—to its dismay—that the game did indeed use all the processing power of the new VAX.

== Founding of Kesmai ==
In 1982 Flinn and Taylor founded the game developer Kesmai, and began working with CompuServe to offer multi-player games on a fee-per-hour basis. But once they began porting their code it turned out that the code that ran for free on the university's computer was hugely inefficient, and they burned $100,000 USD in computer time on CompuServe's system in three days before concluding they needed to rewrite their engine.

Kesmai's major titles include:

- Mega Wars III (1983) — Ironically, it was the chance to create Mega Wars III for CompuServe in 1983 that allowed Kesmai to adapt S for the system and make it available for online play. Another irony: Not one of the Mega Wars games are related to each other except by name; the original was based on the old university mainframe game DECWAR.
- Island of Kesmai (1985) — The rewrite of Flinn and Taylor's old text action adventure game went live at the end of 1985 after a long internal test cycle. It cost $6 an hour at 300 baud (the slow dial-up modems of the day), $12 for 1200 baud (the fast dial-up modems).
- Stellar Warrior (1985) — This rewrite of Mega Wars III introduced substantially simplified game play to expand its potential audience, and debuted on the GEnie online service the same day that Islands of Kesmai went live on CompuServe.
- Air Warrior (1986) — This game, offered on GEnie, is a key milestone in the history of computer games because it was the first commercial multiplayer online game to add graphics, displaying a 3D airplane dogfight environment. (The original Neverwinter Nights, which was the first MMORPG to use graphics, was not to debut until a full five years later in 1991). The original game was on the Apple Macintosh, and was followed by Amiga and Atari ST versions; the IBM PC version debuted in 1987. In another major innovation, Kesmai combined Mac, Amiga, Atari ST, and IBM PC players all in the same game, flying against each other.
- Multiplayer BattleTech: EGA (1991) — This title takes the Air Warrior concept to land-based Mech combat. The game had some problems with frame rate and latency due to the need for the computer to draw more terrain in land-based displays than it needed to draw when planes are flying in the air and much of the background is plain blue sky.

In the 1990s Kesmai was acquired by News Corp, which later sold it to Electronic Arts. The studio was disbanded, but EA continued to use the Kesmai name as a brand.
