= The Great Battles of Alexander =

1997 video game

- British cover art
- Developer: Erudite Software
- Publisher: Interactive Magic
- Producer: S. Craig Taylor
- Designers: Mark Herman, Gene Billingsley
- Series: The Great Battles
- Platform: Windows
- Release: June 22, 1997
- Genre: Turn-based computer wargame
- Modes: Single-player, multiplayer

The Great Battles of Alexander is a 1997 turn-based computer wargame developed by Erudite Software and published by Interactive Magic. Adapted from the GMT Games physical wargame of the same name, it depicts 10 of Alexander the Great's key conflicts, and simulates the interplay between Ancient Macedonian battle tactics and its rival military doctrines. Gameplay occurs at the tactical level: players direct predetermined armies on discrete battlefields, in a manner that one commentator compared to chess.

Development of Alexander began at Erudite Software in 1994, under the direction of Mark Herman, co-designer of the original board game. Its production cycle was long and troubled: following several delays, the game was dropped in 1996 by publisher Strategic Simulations. Interactive Magic ultimately signed Erudite to publish Alexander, and installed S. Craig Taylor as the game's producer. The team sought to make Alexander accessible despite the complexity of the wargame genre, and focused on polishing its audiovisual presentation and interface, the latter of which was inspired by Panzer General.

Critics praised Alexander's historical accuracy, graphics and audio, but noted its frame rate as a low point; a writer for PC Gamer UK argued that this problem helped to ruin the overall product. The title received a "Game of the Month" award from Jerry Pournelle of Byte. After the release of Alexander in June 1997, Erudite and Interactive Magic created two sequel products: The Great Battles of Hannibal (1997) and The Great Battles of Caesar (1998). These three games formed the Great Battles series, and were released together in the Great Battles: Collector's Edition compilation in late 1998. Their game engine was later reused in Erudite's North vs. South.

== Gameplay ==
The Battle of the Hydaspes. General Porus currently has the initiative; his command radius is indicated by the lighter-colored hexagons across the top of the battlefield.

The Great Battles of Alexander is a computer wargame. It recreates the historical military exploits of Alexander the Great via turn-based gameplay. The game takes place on a hex map, and simulates combat at the tactical level; the player navigates an army of predetermined units on discrete battlefields, in a manner that PC PowerPlay compared to chess. Ten historical engagements—such as the Battle of the Hydaspes and the Siege of Pelium—are included.

== Development ==
=== Production ===
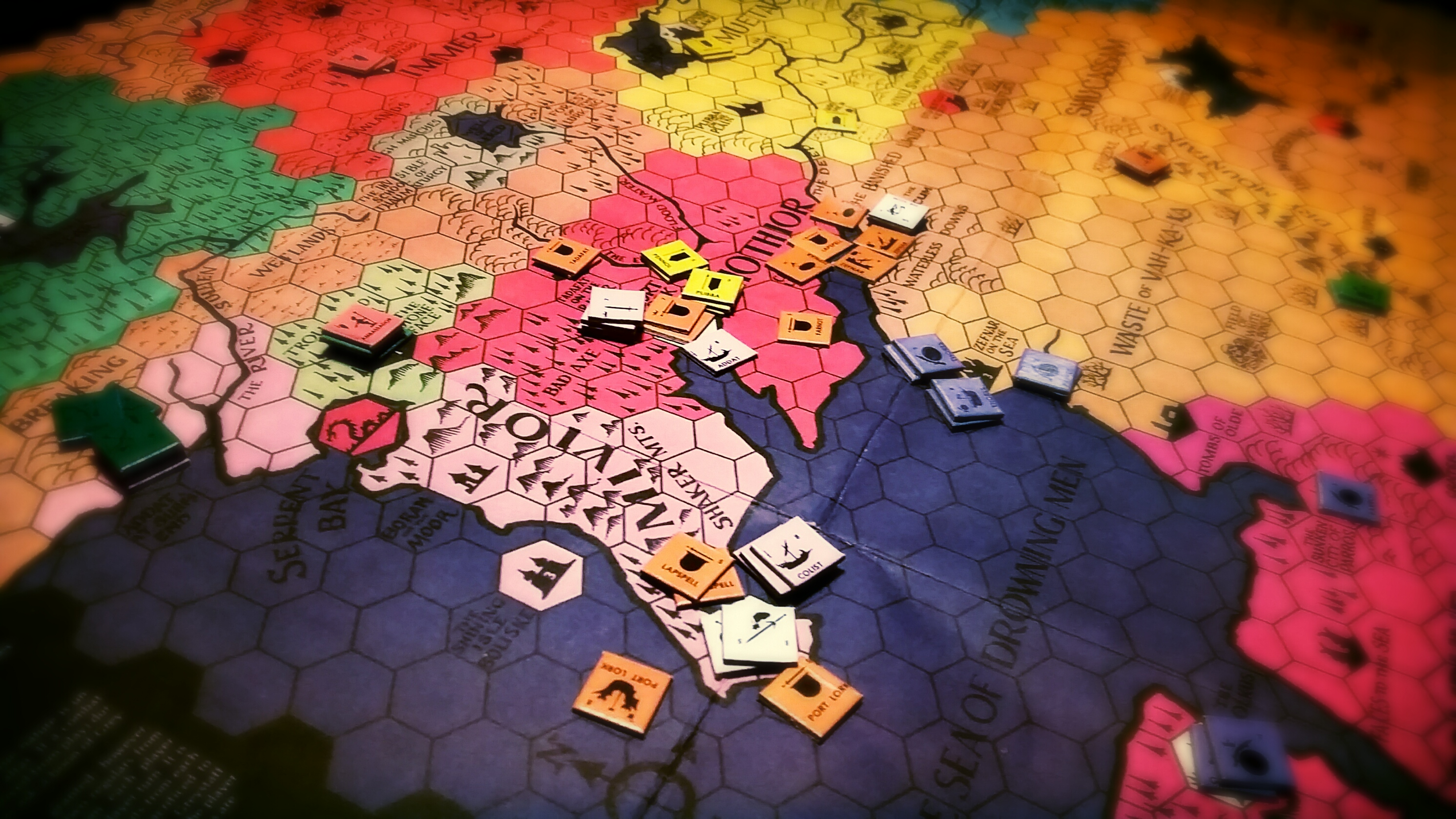
The Great Battles of Alexander was adapted from a board wargame of the same title, which had achieved commercial success in a period of declining sales for the medium.

The Great Battles of Alexander began development at Erudite Software in 1994, as an adaptation of the titular board wargame designed by Mark Herman and Richard Berg, first published by GMT Games in 1991. The physical Great Battles series was known as a commercial success in a period of falling sales for board games. Alexander's computer adaptation was first announced in late 1994, under the direction of Mark Herman, and was created with assistance from GMT. Erudite, a business software developer founded in 1990, initially hoped to self-publish the game. However, the company had partnered with publisher Strategic Simulations (SSI) by the time of Alexander's announcement. At that point, the game was set to include play-by-email (PBEM) support, and Herman explained his plan to apply artificial intelligence (AI) routines he had created originally for the United States Department of Defense. A summer 1995 release was planned.

Alexander experienced a long and troubled development cycle; Scott Udell of Computer Games Strategy Plus later called it "a 'lost child' of the computer wargaming world, moving from one publisher to another and then seeming to disappear completely." By August 1995, production delays at Erudite related to Windows 95 development had pushed the game's projected release back to the following year. As development progressed into 1996, Computer Gaming World's Terry Coleman reported that SSI had grown "tired of waiting" for Erudite to complete the game. As a result, the company dropped Alexander in the first half of the year, and the team was left to search for a new publisher. However, Coleman wrote at the time that "two other major wargame publishers" were rumored to be in talks with the developer. That May, Erudite was purchased for $12.8 million by GSE Systems, a developer of simulation programs for energy companies. The following month, the publication rights for Alexander were picked up by Interactive Magic. Udell called this an example of the publisher's trend of "giv[ing] new life to an orphan wargame product", as it had done with Harpoon Classic 97 and American Civil War: From Sumter to Appomattox.

Interactive Magic and Erudite Software released a game demo for Alexander in January 1997. Later that month, Interactive Magic declared its intent to publish the title alongside two sequel products: The Great Battles of Hannibal and The Great Battles of Caesar. These three games together formed the Great Battles computer wargame series, all produced by the publisher's S. Craig Taylor. At the time, Alexander was slated for release in early 1997; the sequels were given unspecified release dates. In May, Interactive Magic rescheduled Alexander for mid-June. Erudite completed the game on June 12, and it was ultimately released on the 22nd, at a price of roughly $50.

=== Design ===
Mark Herman described Alexander as an attempt to simulate the "interplay" between Ancient Macedonian battle tactics and the tactics of that nation's opponents, such as Persia and Greece. Based on his research into ancient war, he determined that Macedonia relied on a combined arms approach, while Persia favored ranged combat and Greece relied on infantry charges. To capture this clash via game mechanics, Herman categorized each unit into a specific tactical system: when units of rival tactical systems collide in shock combat, a bonus is awarded to the unit with the better system. He noted, "Many wargames treat all combat units as a singular entity while only varying speed and strength to show unit distinctions. I believe this approach is fundamentally wrong and removes most of what is important about tactical interactions in combat." Seeking also to capture the effects of leadership in the ancient world, he created the game's phasing turn structure, which allowed leaders to better display their initiative and range of influence in gameplay.

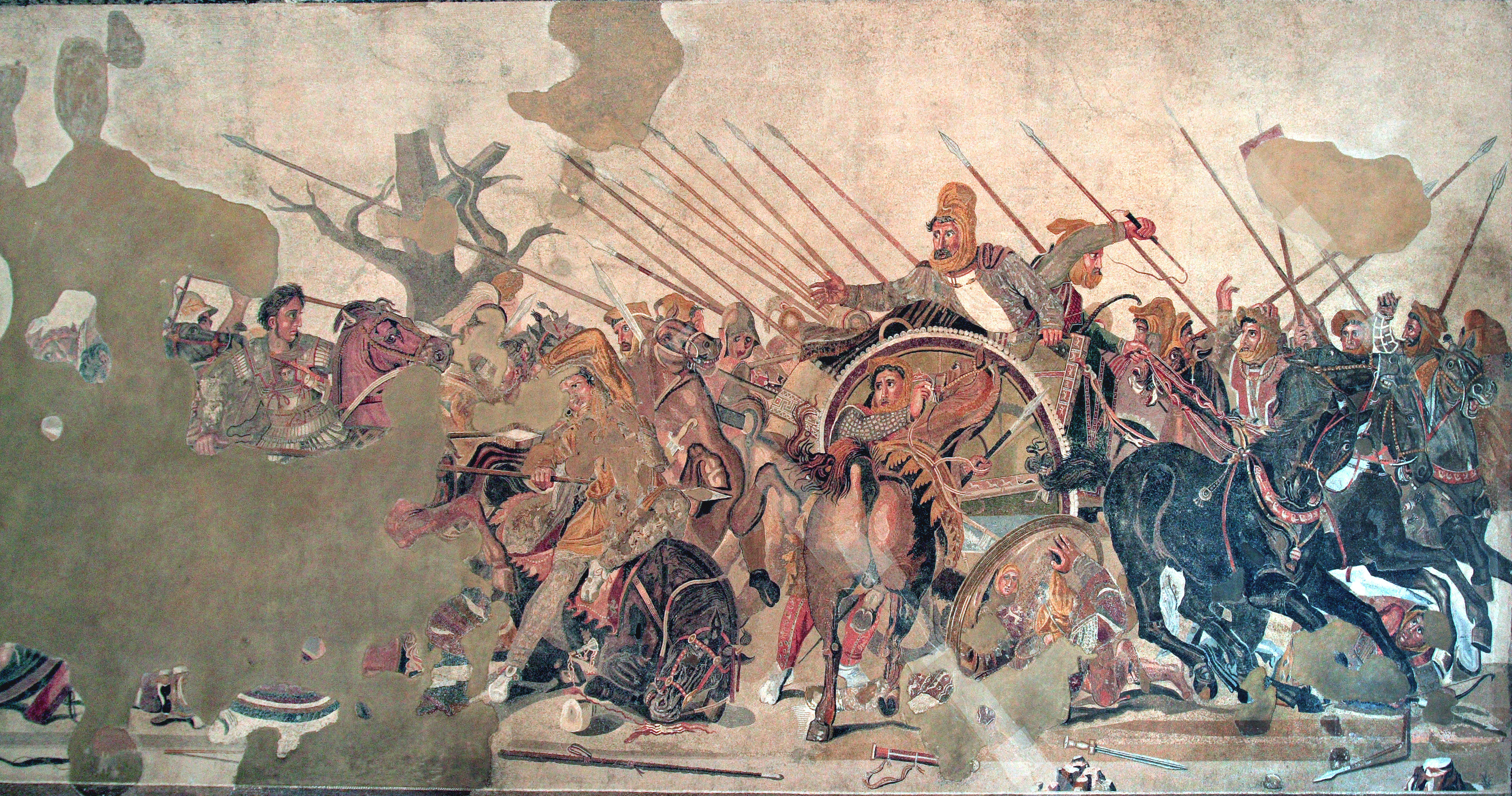
The Great Battles of Alexander was designed to simulate Ancient Macedonian battle tactics and their collision with the tactics of the nation's rivals.

Alexander was adapted from the 1995 Deluxe re-release of the board game, rather than the original 1991 version. In converting a physical game design to computers, Herman hoped to "capture the essence of [the] original intent while using the strength of the new venue [...] to its best advantage." He considered the computer adaptation to be a "simulation", and a more accurate portrayal of Alexander the Great's battles than had been possible in board form. This led him to streamline, automate or eliminate several of the board version's features, including the trumping mechanic, whereby a leader with a high initiative rating could roll dice for a chance to interrupt an enemy leader's momentum. Trumping had been created to cut down on die rolls in the original; with a computer to automate this aspect, he felt that it was no longer necessary. Features from the board game that interrupted game flow, including those that required regular notification prompts, were removed. Herman argued that adapting board rules too literally made for poor computer gameplay, and that "the less times you remind the player he is playing [on] a computer and the more times you keep the interface environment constant and uninterrupted the better".

Erudite and Interactive Magic hoped to make Alexander both accessible to wargame newcomers and appealing to hardcore enthusiasts in the genre. They sought a product "so friendly that you can jump right in and enjoy it", which offered historical accuracy for experienced players and educational value for novices, according to co-designer Gene Billingsley. A heavy focus was placed on polishing the audiovisual presentation, which Bill Stealey of Interactive Magic believed would give the game a wide appeal. Craig Taylor noted the team's choice of a miniature wargaming graphical style, in opposition to wargame visuals akin to "a few figures [pasted] to the top of a counter". Inspiration for the game's audio was drawn from an episode of You Are There, in which Walter Cronkite performs a mock interview with Alexander the Great during the Battle of Gaugamela. Taylor likened the sequence's sound design to "a really intense football game". The team also simplified and streamlined the game's interface; at the time, Billingsley criticized earlier wargames for being needlessly inaccessible to newcomers. He remarked, "We believe strongly in the Panzer General type of interface, because it was so successful in getting the game to the player."

== Reception and legacy ==
Reception

Review scores
Publication	Score
Computer Gaming World	4.5/5
PC Gamer (UK)	58%
PC Gamer (US)	86%
Computer Games Strategy Plus	4.5/5
PC PowerPlay	80%

Award
Publication	Award
Byte	Game of the Month

The Great Battles of Alexander was named Byte magazine's "Game of the Month" by columnist Jerry Pournelle. Calling it "the best classical era war game I've ever come across", Pournelle praised Alexander as a detailed and accurate portrayal of ancient war, without the time-consuming mathematical calculations required by board wargames.

The reviewer for Computer Games Strategy Plus, Robert Mayer, shared Pournelle's regard for Alexander's intuitive simplicity. "[F]or a boardgame conversion, this is as good as it gets", he argued. Mayer and Computer Gaming World's Jim Cobb offered plaudits to the game's visuals and interface, although they disagreed on the quality of the AI, about which Mayer had reservations. However, they concurred on the overall strength of the product: Cobb called Alexander "simply the best-ever ancients system", and a wargame "otherwise flawless" beyond frame rate problems and minor historical oversights.

PC Gamer US wargame columnist William R. Trotter continued the praise for Alexander's graphics and, along with Mayer, its audio. However, he echoed Cobb's complaints about its poor frame rate, while noting the "steep learning curve" and the bugs and errors within the interface. Although Trotter found these issues "minor in comparison to the overall achievement", James Weston of the magazine's British edition argued that frame rate and AI problems ruined the product. Despite enjoying the interface and campaign, he remarked that Alexander "will disappoint."

Writing for PC PowerPlay in Australia, reviewer March Stepnik compared Alexander favorably to real-time strategy titles such as Command & Conquer and Warcraft II: Tides of Darkness. Like Trotter, who considered the game to be "packed with authenticity", Stepnik singled out Alexander's "authentic feel" and deep, realistic strategy as high points. While he found the graphics mediocre and music unsuitable, he enjoyed the game overall. "Just don't be expecting any cheap and easy thrills — this will require some major investment", Stepnik concluded.

After the release of Alexander, Erudite Software and Interactive Magic launched the sequel, The Great Battles of Hannibal, in November 1997. The two games were followed by The Great Battles of Caesar early the next year. The Great Battles: Collector's Edition, which joined Alexander with its sequels, was released in December 1998. The series' game engine was later reused in North vs. South: The Great American Civil War, developed by Erudite and published by Interactive Magic.
