= Multiplayer BattleTech 3025 =

Multiplayer BattleTech: 3025
- Developer(s): Kesmai
- Genre(s): MMORPG

Multiplayer BattleTech: 3025 is a PC MMORPG developed by Kesmai during the same period as Microsoft's MechWarrior 4: Vengeance. The game occupies the fictional 31st century universe of BattleTech and focuses centrally on the large robotic war machines called BattleMechs ('Mechs) and the individuals who pilot them. The game was released as a beta in 2001 and shut down with little explanation on December 6, 2001.

== History ==
Multiplayer BattleTech: 3025 is the third online incarnation of the BattleTech series. The first was Multiplayer BattleTech: EGA, available on the GEnie game service, followed by Multiplayer BattleTech: Solaris.

Kesmai originally farmed out development of the title to Israeli developer 2 AM, but the resulting product was considered a failure and resulted in the game being pulled back into Kesmai studio under the lead of Nick Laiacona and Matt Shaw. During this period Kesmai focused on reengineering the 3D combat portion of the game to use the studio's internal K3D rendering engine. Development continued after Kesmai's purchase by Electronic Arts and included an overhaul of the galactic conquest portion of the game.

== Gameplay ==
Players of 3025 connected to an MMOG-style server, selected an affiliation in the form of a Great House, selected a planet, then descended to the surface to engage in a virtual four-on-four battle with opposing players. The results of such battles were planets being won and lost for the five major houses, shifting the borders of various factions in the Inner Sphere. 3025 used many more of the original BattleTech rules than the MechWarrior series.

== Reception ==
A Game Pressure review described the game as a MMOG with 150 types of combat robots and MMO-typical gameplay, experience tracks and in-game factions, but only awarded 2.3 out of 10 points.

GameSpot editor Trey Walker raised doubts whether Electronic Arts (E.A.) would continue developing the game in late October 2001 and noted that E.A. had announced massive layoffs of staff who worked on online content while keeping quiet on the future of BattleTech: 3025 and on the criteria they would use to determine whether they would work towards an official release version.
