= Semper =

Semper may refer to:

== Mottos ==
- Semper caveo (Latin: Always beware), a motto of the polygraph testers of the US National Security Agency
- Semper fidelis (Latin: Always faithful), a motto used by, among others, the United States Marine Corps
- Semper fortis (Latin: Always courageous), an unofficial motto of the United States Navy
- Semper Gumby (Dog Latin: Always flexible), an unofficial motto of the USCG, USMC, USPHS, CAP, Emergency Management and more
- Semper maior (Latin: Always more, always greater), a motto of Ignatius of Loyola, the founder of the Jesuits
- Semper montani liberi (Latin: Mountaineers are always free), the West Virginia state motto
- Semper paratus (Latin: Always ready), the United States Coast Guard motto
- Semper primus (always first), a Latin phrase used as a motto by several United States and Israeli military units
- Semper supra (Latin: Always above), the official motto and march of the United States Space Force
- Semper vigilans (always vigilant), a Latin phrase used as a motto by the Civil Air Patrol, several military units, and the city of San Diego, California, U.S.
- Semper vigilo (Latin: Always vigilant or Always alert), motto of Police Scotland
- Sic semper tyrannis (Latin: Thus always to tyrants), motto of Virginia
- Quas dederis solas semper habebis opes (Latin: "What thou hast given alone shall be eternal riches unto thee"), motto of Queen Mary's Grammar School, England

== People ==
- Carl Semper (1832–1893), German ethnologist and animal ecologist
- Colin Semper (1938–2022), Anglican priest
- Ene-Liis Semper (born 1969), Estonian video artist, performance artist, scenographer and theatre director
- Georg Semper (1837–1909), German entomologist
- Gottfried Semper (1803–1879), German architect, art critic, and professor of architecture
- Johannes Semper (1892–1970), Estonian writer and translator
- John Semper, American screenwriter, producer and story editor
- Manfred Semper, German architect of the second Dresden Opera House and son of Gottfried Semper
- Natalya Yevgenevna Semper (1911–1995), Soviet memoirist and Egyptologist
- Trevor Semper (born 1970), Montserratian cricketer

== Other uses ==
- Semper (food brand), Swedish brand of infant food, a member of Hero Group
- "Semper I", 2011 episode of the psychological thriller TV series Homeland
- Semperoper, an opera house in Dresden, Germany
- Semper (Property Management System), Hotel Software company based in South Africa

== See also ==
- Ea Semper, 1907 apostolic letter written by Pope Pius X
- Semper fi (disambiguation)
- Semper fidelis (disambiguation)
