= North v South (disambiguation) =

North versus South may refer to multiple topics:

== Sport ==
- North v South, an annual match in English cricket (1836–1961)
- North vs South rugby union match in New Zealand, first played in 1897
- North–South Shrine Game in American football (1948–1976)

== Film ==
- North v South (film), 2015 British crime drama

== Computer games ==
- North vs. South: The Great American Civil War, 1999
- North & South (video game), 1989 American Civil War game

== See also ==
- North and South (disambiguation)
- North of South (disambiguation)
