= Semper fi (disambiguation) =

Semper fi is a shortened form of the Latin phrase semper fidelis.

Semper fi (Semper Fi) may also refer to:

- "Semper Fi" (1988), an episode from season one of Sonny Spoon
- "Semper Fi" (1989), a 9-issue comic book series published by Marvel Comics
- "Semper Fi" (2000), a Huffamoose song from I Wanna Be Your Pants
- "Semper Fi" (2009), an episode of Kamen Rider: Dragon Knight
- "Semper Fi" (2011), a Trace Adkins song from Proud to Be Here, deluxe edition
- Semper Fi: Always Faithful (2011), a documentary film about the Camp Lejeune water contamination
- Semper Fi, a TV film in the McBride (2005) movie series
- "Semper Fi", a 1964 story by Damon Knight
- Semper Fi (film), a British film starring Jai Courtney and Nat Wolff
- Semper Fi (video game), a 1998 video game from Interactive Magic

== See also ==
- Semper fidelis (disambiguation)
- Semper Phi
