= The Great Battles of Caesar =

1998 video game

- Developer: Erudite Software
- Publisher: Interactive Magic
- Series: The Great Battles
- Release: March 26, 1998
- Genre: Computer wargame
- Modes: Single-player, multiplayer

The Great Battles of Caesar is 1998 computer wargame developed by Erudite Software and published by Interactive Magic. Based on the board wargame The Great Battles of Julius Caesar, it is the third and final entry in the Great Battles computer wargame series.

== Development ==
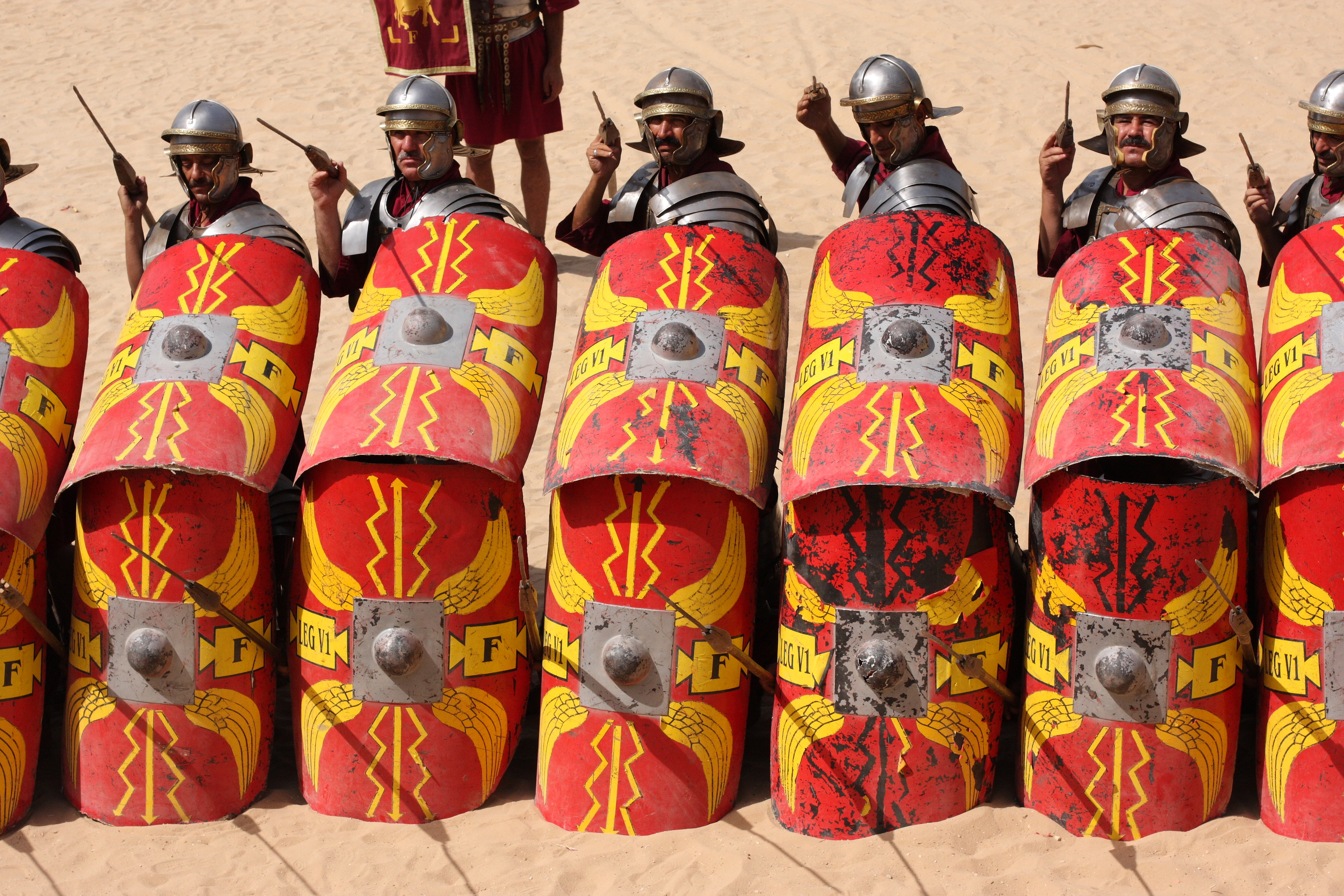
The Great Battles of Caesar depicts Roman infantry tactics after the emergence of the legionary previously attributed to the so-called "Marian reforms".

The Great Battles of Caesar was announced by publisher Interactive Magic and developer Erudite Software in early 1997, alongside its direct predecessor, Hannibal. Erudite had signed with the company in mid-1996 to publish both games' forebear, The Great Battles of Alexander, after that title's long and troubled development cycle. The publisher declared its intent to release all three games as the Great Battles series in January 1997, and assigned S. Craig Taylor to be their producer. GMT Games assisted in the creation of the series, and each entry was based on one of its board titles. Alexander launched in June, while Hannibal appeared on November 7. By mid-1997, Interactive Magic had scheduled Caesar for release in spring of the following year.

Erudite based Caesar on GMT's board wargame The Great Battles of Julius Caesar, but built it with a modified form of the mechanical game system it had previously used in Alexander and Hannibal. To simulate Roman tactics in the era following Hannibal's defeat (which scholars through much of the 20th century attributed to so-called "Marian reforms"), the team altered the series' mechanics to change the basic unit from the manipular legion, with its three lines (hastati, principes and triarii) of infantry, to the more homogeneous Marian legion. However, Erudite sought "only slightly" to represent the many tactical changes during this era, such as by mimicking the expansion of Rome's chain of command via the inclusion of section commanders. Caesar shares its predecessors' game engine, which the team updated for the project. Visual upgrades were included as well.

In early January 1998, Interactive Magic confirmed the spring release date for Caesar, and announced that it would cease publishing Great Battles titles thereafter. Computer Gaming World wargame columnist Terry Coleman lamented this decision, which he called "a real shame for fans of [GMT Games'] Samurai in particular". Later in January, the publisher gave Caesar a firmer release date of March. Erudite completed the game on March 11, and it launch on the 26th.

== Reception ==
Reception

Review scores
Publication	Score
Computer Gaming World	4/5
PC Zone	72/100
Computer Games Strategy Plus	3.5/5

Award
Publication	Award
Computer Gaming World	Best Wargame 1998 (runner-up)

The Great Battles of Caesar was the runner-up for Computer Gaming World's 1998 "Best Wargame" award, which ultimately went to The Operational Art of War. The editors wrote of Caesar, "With improved graphics, aggressive AI, a solid campaign, and an excellent scenario editor, it's the best ancients game in more than a decade for the PC."

Computer Gaming World's Jim Cobb called Caesar "not only the best of the Great Battles series to date, it's also the most realistic ancients-era game yet on the PC." While he found its graphics middling, and noted that the slow performance continued from its predecessors, Cobb summarized, "If you're willing to put up with its eccentricities, Caesar does a remarkable job of recreating ancient warfare." Mark H. Walker of Computer Games Strategy Plus wrote that Caesar is "fun, challenging, and mildly addictive", but also "annoyingly flawed and somewhat dated." Like Cobb, he criticized the game's slow performance, and called the campaign mode "as strategically challenging as a game of Chutes and Ladders." Walker summarized Caesar as "worth a look".

== Aftermath ==
Following the release of Caesar, rumors spread inside the game industry that publisher Interactive Magic intended to reuse the Great Battles game engine for another project. In June, this new game was revealed under the tentative title Rally Round the Flag, under development again by Erudite. It was designed by Craig Taylor; Erudite created only the art and code for the project. Later renamed North vs. South, the game launched in February 1999.

In July 1998, Interactive Magic announced The Great Battles: Collector's Edition, which bundled Caesar with its two predecessors. This SKU updated Hannibal and Alexander to match Caesar's visuals and programming, and includes a mission editor that allows players to create hypothetical battles. Originally set for September 1998, the Collector's Edition was ultimately released in December.
