= North and South =

North and South may refer to:

== Literature ==
- North and South (Gaskell novel), an 1854 novel by Elizabeth Gaskell
- North and South (trilogy), a series of novels by John Jakes (1982–1987)
  - North and South (Jakes novel), first novel in the series
- North & South, a 1946 poetry collection by Elizabeth Bishop
- Avatar: The Last Airbender – North and South, a 2016–2017 graphic novel trilogy

=== Magazines ===
- North & South (New Zealand magazine)
- North & South (US magazine), covering the American Civil War

== Television and movies ==
- North and South, a 1966 BBC adaptation of the novel by Elizabeth Gaskell starring Wendy Williams
- North and South, a 1975 BBC2 adaptation of the novel by Elizabeth Gaskell starring Patrick Stewart; see Patrick Stewart on stage and screen § Television
- North and South (miniseries), a 1985 and later miniseries based on the novels of John Jakes
- North & South (British serial), a 2004 BBC TV adaptation of Elizabeth Gaskell's novel with Richard Armitage as John Thornton
- North/South, a 2006 CBC television series
- North-South, or Four Buddies and the Bride, a 2015 Armenian comedy directed by David Babakhanyan
- Uttar Dakshin (lit. 'North South'), a 1987 Indian Hindi-language action drama film

== Music ==
- North & South, a late 1990s boyband who starred in the television series No Sweat
- North and South (album), an album by Gerry Rafferty and a song on the album
- North and South, a 2011 album by Milow
- "North and South", a song by the Clash from Cut the Crap (1985)
- "Uttar Dakshin" (lit. 'North South'), a song by Nusrat Fateh Ali Khan, Alka Yagnik and Sonu Nigam from the 1997 Indian film Aur Pyaar Ho Gaya

== Sport ==
- Golf tournaments at Pinehurst Resort, North Carolina, U.S.A.:
  - North and South Open, 1902–1951
  - North and South Men's Amateur Golf Championship, staged annually since 1901
  - North and South Women's Amateur Golf Championship, staged annually since 1902

== Video games ==
- North & South (computer game), a 1989 strategy title focusing on the American Civil War for multiple formats
  - The Bluecoats: North vs South, a 2012 remake of the game; see North & South (video game) § Remakes
- North vs. South: The Great American Civil War, a 1999 video game

== Orientation (geometry) ==
- Two of the four cardinal directions
- A line of longitude
- A vertical circle in astronomy

== Other ==
- North and South Railway, a defunct planned American railroad from Casper, Wyoming to Miles City, Montana
- North and South Railroad of Georgia, a bankrupt American railroad from Columbus, Georgia to Rome, Georgia
- North–south position, a ground grappling position
- North–south, a pattern of computer network traffic between client and server; see Software-defined networking § Changing traffic patterns
- North–South divide in the World, a socio-economic and political division between "North" developed countries and "South" developing countries

== See also ==
- North v South (disambiguation)
- East West
