= MegaWars =

Video game series

MegaWars was a series of real-time online multiplayer space empire building games which were hosted on CompuServe in the 1980s and lasted well into the 1990s. The original MegaWars I was a port of Decwar, originally developed at the University of Texas at Austin. A port using a basic client/server protocol and a basic graphical interface on the TRS-80 Color Computer as MegaWars II was never released. MegaWars III followed, based on an entirely different engine originally developed by Kesmai.
