= EW =

EW, Ew, or ew may refer to:

== Arts and entertainment ==
- "Ew!", a 2014 song by Jimmy Fallon and will.i.am
- "Ew", a 2020 song by Joji from Nectar
- Elsevier Weekblad, a Dutch news magazine
- Entertainment Weekly, an American magazine, published by Meredith
- Eugene Weekly, an alternative weekly newspaper published in Eugene, Oregon
- Extreme Warfare, a series of computer games

== Science and technology ==
- Electronic warfare, the use of electromagnetic energy in warfare
- Electroweak interaction, in physics
- Electrowinning, an electro-chemical process
- Entomological warfare, a type of biological warfare that uses insects to attack the enemy
- Equivalent weight, in chemistry
- Exawatt, an SI unit of power
- Extinct in the wild, a conservation status level

== Transport ==
- NZR EW Class Electric Locomotive, Electric locomotive used in the Wellington region of New Zealand

== Other uses ==
- Ew (digraph), in the English language
- Each-way (bet), a wager consisting of a win bet and a place bet
- Abbreviation for East West, comparable to "NS" for North-South or "UD" for Up-Down
- Eurowings (IATA code: EW), a German airline
- Ew, onomatopoeia to imitate disgust
- EW- It is a taxonomic classification of animals

== See also ==
- Eww (disambiguation)
