= IF/A-18E Carrier Strike Fighter =

1998 video game

iF/A-18E Carrier Strike Fighter
- Developer: Interactive Magic
- Publisher: Interactive Magic
- Platform: Microsoft Windows
- Release: NA: August 24, 1998
- Genre: Combat flight simulator
- Mode: Single-player

iF/A-18E Carrier Strike Fighter is a combat flight simulation game developed and published by Interactive Magic for Microsoft Windows in 1998.

== Reception ==
Reception

Aggregate score
Aggregator	Score
GameRankings	62%

Review scores
Publication	Score
Computer Games Strategy Plus	3/5
Computer Gaming World	2/5
GamePro	3.5/5
GameRevolution	C+
GameSpot	6/10
Hyper	72%
IGN	6.8/10
PC Gamer (UK)	73%
PC Gamer (US)	58%
PC PowerPlay	68%
PC Zone	70%

The game received mixed reviews according to the review aggregation website GameRankings.

== See also ==
- iF-22
- iF-16
