= Destiny: World Domination from Stone Age to Space Age =

1996 video game

- Developer(s): Dagger Interactive
- Publisher(s): Interactive Magic
- Producer(s): Bill Stealey
- Composer(s): Donald S. Griffin
- Platform(s): Windows 95
- Release: NA: October 15, 1996; EU: 1997
- Genre(s): 4X

Destiny: World Domination from Stone Age to Space Age is a 1996 4X video game developed by British team Dagger Interactive and published by Interactive Magic.

== Gameplay ==
The game can be played in real time and turn-based mode, on a 800x400 map.

There are 12 playable countries: the United States, the United Kingdom, China, Egypt, France, Germany, India, Israel, Italy, Japan, Russia, and Sweden. Each country's military units appear unique, rather than identical. Military units range from basic warriors armed with clubs to advanced ICBMs equipped with hydrogen bombs, with a distinction made between atomic and hydrogen bombs. Other units include trebuchets, Mongolian rockets, Hussars, cavalry, Arquebus infantry, bazookas, to biplanes, nuclear bombers, and nuclear submarines, which could launch missiles. Military battles can be commanded at the tactical level, with the player directing troop movements and such.

There are 24 types of resources, ranging from raw iron ore to armored steel.

There are six religions in the game: Paganism, Judaism, Christianity, Islam, Buddhism, and Hinduism. Each has associated buildings of worship.

The final patch released is version 1.146, released on April 29, 1997.
