= The Great Battles =

Computer wargame

- Genre(s): Wargame
- Developer(s): Erudite Software
- Publisher(s): Interactive Magic

The Great Battles is a computer wargame series based on the Great Battles of History board game series by GMT Games. The three titles in the series—The Great Battles of Alexander, The Great Battles of Hannibal and The Great Battles of Caesar—were developed by Erudite Software and published by Interactive Magic.

== Gameplay ==
The Great Battles is a historical turn-based combat series. Players control one of three military commanders depending on the title, Alexander, Hannibal, and Caesar. Alternatively, players can also control the corresponding aggressors of each military commander, such as Darius or Pompey, and fight against them. Combat in game is turn based, and players choose from a variety of militants, weapons, and strategic formations to compete with. There are over 30 historical engagements across the franchise that can be simulated.

== Games ==
- The Great Battles of Alexander (June 22, 1997)
- The Great Battles of Hannibal (November 7, 1997)
- The Great Battles of Caesar (March 26, 1998)
- The Great Battles Collector's Edition (December 1998)

== Development history ==
Erudite Software developed all three Great Battles titles with the same game engine.

== Reception ==
According to Computer Games Strategy Plus, the Great Battles games were "very well received by wargamers", and were successful enough that Interactive Magic worked with Erudite Software again to produce the wargame North vs. South. Alan Dunkin of GameSpot likewise called the series a "relative success".

The Great Battles Collector's Edition won the 1998 Charles Roberts Award for "Best Pre-Twentieth Century Computer Wargame".
