= Fierce Harmony =

1999 video game

- Developer: Indigo Moon Productions
- Publisher: Kesmai Corporation
- Platform: Windows
- Release: September 8, 1999

Fierce Harmony is a 1999 video game from Indigo Moon Productions. The game was available in trial form in April 1999.

== Gameplay ==
Fierce Harmony is a turn-based, online 3D sword-fighting strategy game set in a primitive world called the Nexus. Players create warriors by selecting key attributes and engage in ritual combat across 12 unique arenas, each with environmental traits that can help or hinder fighters.

The gameplay blends strategic planning with customizable swordplay. Players can:

- Form alliances to share power and attributes, with the strongest warrior in each group holding the most influence.
- Develop personalized combat techniques by combining motion-captured ritual attack moves.
- Adjust tactics mid-battle to exploit advantages or cover weaknesses.

The game emphasizes both individual skill and strategic depth, offering a mix of one-on-one dueling and alliance-based power dynamics.

== Development ==
Fierce Harmony was showcased at E3 1997. In June 1997, WorldPlay Entertainment acquired the exclusive global online rights to the game. The game designed by Michael Pierre Price was developed with a budget of more than $600,000.

== Reception ==
Reception

Review score
| Publication | Score |
|---|---|
| PC Joker | 42% |

PC Joker gave the game a score of 42 out of 100 stating "Fierce Harmony may be quite nice as an animation demo, but as an alternative to "Virtua Fighter 2" the game fails across the board".
