= Star Rangers (video game) =

1995 video game

- Developer(s): Interactive Magic
- Publisher(s): Interactive Magic
- Platform(s): MS-DOS
- Release: October 1995
- Genre(s): Space flight simulator

Star Rangers is a space flight simulator and strategy video game for MS-DOS developed by Interactive Magic and published in October 1995.

== Plot ==
Players take on the role of a Star Ranger, the equivalent of law enforcement in the 23rd century, a pilot of a high-tech spaceship which he uses to repel Tuareg bandits along shared borders.

== Gameplay ==
The game starts in a practice mode in which the player continually faces waves of enemies until death. This is an 'arcade' option of the game, which doesn't explore the storyline. The game offers a campaign mode which comprises a group of missions in which these encounters escalate. These missions evolve from incursion defense, to escort duty, to outright assaults.

Players are provided only the Star Ranger spaceship throughout the campaign, but are offered a fair amount of customization of loadout and tuning. The player can divert energy to defenses (shield recharge) and offense (plasma gun recharge, autocannon reload). These levels can be adjusted for maximum performance or efficiency, energy being consumed faster in the former than in the latter. Players acquire a wider variety of missiles for their arsenal as they progress, from 'sharpsticks' to torpedoes.

Strategy evolves from the mapping system built-in, where pilots can travel across a certain area of space. Enemies can attack multiple targets including friendly bases and sensor buoys. Buoys contain map information and so when destroyed or not present act as a rudimentary fog of war. The player has the option, at expense of energy, to warp and near-instantaneously travel across the map to attack, defend, or refuel at a friendly base.

== Development ==
The developers designed the game to allow players to select their next mission in an open-ended format. Producer Michael Chen explained, "We were trying to make a break from the genre that tells you where you have to be and when."
