= Thunder Brigade =

1998 video game

- Developer: Bluemoon Interactive
- Publisher: Interactive Magic
- Platform: Windows
- Release: NA: December 17, 1998; EU: 1999
- Genre: Action

Thunder Brigade is an action video game developed by Bluemoon Interactive and published by Interactive Magic and Midas Interactive Entertainment for Microsoft Windows in 1998–1999.

== Production and release ==
Excluding time for engine development, Thunder Brigade was developed over the course of 1998. The game's design was supervised by Arnold Hendrick.

While the game released on time and met the requirements of its development agreement; due to an intense development process that required sacrificing gameplay testing in favour of '"ordinary" software design tasks' and financial difficulties within Interactive Magic, the game was considered to have "sold rather poorly" by Bluemoon Interactive.

== Reception ==
Reception

Aggregate score
Aggregator	Score
GameRankings	50%

Review scores
Publication	Score
Computer Games Strategy Plus	1.5/5
Computer Gaming World	3/5
GameSpot	5.1/10
GameStar	58%
PC Accelerator	2/10
PC Gamer (US)	40%
PC Games (DE)	27%
PC PowerPlay	79%
PC Zone	60%

The game received mixed reviews according to the review aggregation website GameRankings.
