= Huffamoose (album) =

Studio album by Huffamoose
- Released: April 16, 1995
- Recorded: August 1993
- Genre: Alternative rock
- Length: 56:30
- Label: 7 Records

Huffamoose chronology
Huffamoose (1995)	We've Been Had Again (1997)

Professional ratings
Review scores
Source	Rating
AllMusic	4/5 stars

Huffamoose is the debut album by alternative rock band Huffamoose. It was released in 1995 on 7 Records.

== Track listing ==
All tracks are written by Craig Elkins.

No.	Title	Length
1.	"Everybody Else"	4:45
2.	"I Wanna Buy You a Ring"	5:17
3.	"Altar of Whatever"	5:32
4.	"Delusion"	3:44
5.	"Song About Nothing"	8:46
6.	"Celeste"	5:52
7.	"James"	6:07
8.	"Mary"	5:55
9.	"I Can't Turn Around"	4:41
10.	"Sacred Ground"	5:51
