= Air Warrior II =

1997 video game

- Developer(s): Kesmai
- Publisher(s): Interactive Magic
- Platform(s): Microsoft Windows
- Release: NA: February 11, 1997
- Genre(s): Combat flight simulator

Air Warrior II is a video game developed by American studio Kesmai Corporation and published by Interactive Magic for Windows. It is a sequel to Air Warrior.

== Gameplay ==
Air Warrior II is a flight simulator which allows dozens of international players to challenge each other.

== Development ==
Development of Air Warrior II was directly overseen by Bill Stealey, founder of the game's publisher, Interactive Magic.

== Reception ==
Next Generation gave it four stars out of five, and wrote that AWII is for WWII flight enthusiasts and an excellent choice for anyone looking for a great online multiplayer game. During the inaugural Interactive Achievement Awards, Air Warrior II received a nomination for "Online Game of the Year" by the Academy of Interactive Arts & Sciences.
