= EWW =

EWW may refer to:

- eww (web browser)
- Elinor Wonders Why
- Every Witch Way
- Ewell West railway station, Surrey, England
- Extreme wind warning

== See also ==
- EW (disambiguation)
- Disgust
