= IPanzer '44 =

1998 video game

iPanzer '44
- Developer: Charybdis Enterprises
- Publisher: Interactive Magic
- Platform: Windows
- Release: March 30, 1998
- Genre: Tank simulator

iPanzer '44 is a 1998 video game from Interactive Magic. It's a tank simulation game where WWII US Russian and German tanks pit against each other.

== Gameplay ==
iPanzer '44 is a World War II tank simulation game that places players in command of armored forces from three factions: American, Russian, and German. The game offers both single missions and dynamic campaigns set on the Eastern Front (Belorussia) and Western Front (Ardennes). Players can command an entire armored company and switch between tactical top-down views and immersive first-person perspectives inside the tanks. In first-person mode, players can assume the roles of tank commander, gunner, or driver, and switch between vehicles as needed. The game includes realism settings that allow it to be adjusted from arcade-style gameplay to a more serious simulation. Only medium tanks are featured—specifically the M4A3/76 Sherman (American), T-34/85 (Russian), and PzKw V Panther (German)—as the developers aimed to reflect the typical vehicles used by tank crews during the war.

== Development ==
The game was developed by Charybdis Enterprises, a company founded in June 1995. It was showcased at E3 1997.

== Reception ==
Reception

Review scores
Publication	Score
Computer Games Magazine	1/5/5
GameSpot	3.3/10
GameStar	68%
PC Player	63/100
PC Gamer	44%

Computer Games Magazine said "The highly detailed manual and the dynamic campaign structure hint at what this game could have been. However, the combination of outdated graphics and an AI that simply can't figure out how to move or fight make iPanzer44 a huge disappointment"
