= Huffamoose =

American rock band

Background information
- Origin: Philadelphia, Pennsylvania, United States
- Genres: Alternative rock Jazz
- Years active: 1991–present
- Labels: 7 Records, Winding Way Records, Interscope Records, Shanachie Records
- Members: Craig Elkins; Kevin Hanson; Jim Stager; Erik Johnson
- Past members: Chuck Treece
- Website: www.Huffamoose.com

Huffamoose is an American rock band from Philadelphia formed c.1992.

== History ==
Huffamoose formed in Philadelphia, with the original lineup including Craig Elkins (vocals, guitar), Kevin Hanson (guitar, vocals), Jim Stager (bass) and Erik Johnson (drums). This remained consistent until sometime in 1999, when Erik Johnson quit the band after a tour stop on the Horde Tour. He was replaced by Chuck Treece.

The group is best known for its hit single "Wait", which reached No. 34 on the Billboard Modern Rock charts in 1998.

Huffamoose released their first album in 14 years, …And That’s When the Golf Ball Hit Me in the Head on November 23, 2018 on Winding Way Records. The band returned to their original lineup for the album.

Huffamoose performed its last shows in 2018 at Ardmore Music Hall and appeared on WXPN's World Cafe Live. The band also performed at 118 North and at the Wayne Music Festival in 2017. In 2025, the band reunited for a concert at Ardmore Music Hall in Ardmore, Pennsylvania on September 11.

== Documentary ==
The documentary Here Comes Huffamoose follows the band as they made the journey from being the probable "next big thing" to their ultimate demise. It was screened at the Silver Lake Film Festival in 2003. In the March 2004 edition of Premiere, Cameron Crowe named it as one of the best rock movies of all time.

The group reunited for live shows in 2009, and continues to play sporadic shows at local venues in the Philadelphia area.

== Pop Culture ==
The song "Buy You a Ring", from We've Been Had Again, was used in television advertisements for J. C. Penney.

The song “Zero Hours”, appears in season 1 of Alias, episode 5.

== Discography ==
- Huffamoose (1993)
- We've Been Had Again (1997)
- I Wanna Be Your Pants (2000)
- Kneeslappers (2004)
- The Death of Cool (2004)
- …And That’s When the Golf Ball Hit Me in the Head (2018)
