= MegaWars III =

CompuServe video game, ran 1984–1999

MegaWars III was a massively multiplayer empire building game written by Kesmai and run continuously on CompuServe between 1984 and 1999. It was one of CompuServe's most popular games throughout its lifetime with thousands of players joining the month-long game cycles. It was only shut down after CIS was purchased by AOL and moved to the web-based "CompuServe 2000" interface that would not cleanly support it. A modified version, Stellar Emperor ran for much of the same time period on GEnie, also ending in 1999 when that service was shut down by General Electric. A new version of Stellar Emperor, sporting a new client-server GUI, was run for a short period on Kesmai's GameStorm.

== History ==
=== S ===
In 1979 University of Virginia 4th year students Kelton Flinn and John Taylor started work on a game for the Hewlett-Packard HP 2000F time sharing minicomputer. Known simply as S, the game supported up to eight players on directly connected 2400 baud terminals. Much of what would become MegaWars III was present in S, but greatly simplified. This included ship-to-ship combat, the galaxy layout and creation engine, and a simple planetary economics system. The game was much "smaller" however, supporting fewer players and a smaller 255-system "galaxy".

=== MegaWars ===
Bill Louden was in charge of games at CompuServe. In 1982 he purchased a version of DECWAR and turned it over to the programmers at Kesmai, who wrote many of CompuServe's games. While completing their doctorates, Flinn and Taylor started Kesmai, a reference to their first commercial product, Islands of Kesmai. They found that the copyright said nothing about commercial uses, and quickly produced a new version that removed any potentially lawsuit-friendly names from the Star Trek universe with more generic versions.

The new version, MegaWars, went live on CompuServe in 1983 and ran continuously until 1998, although there were a few times where they closed it down during that period only to revive it after receiving complaints from the players. Numerous additions were made during its run, notably different classes of ships, and later versions looked little like the original DECWAR.

During this period a port supporting an experimental color computer terminal being built by Motorola and Radio Shack was completed as MegaWars II. This machine was sold only briefly, under the name "VideoTex", before being withdrawn from the market, and MegaWars II was never completed. The experimental terminal would later be used as the basis for the TRS-80 Color Computer.

=== MegaWars III ===
Returning to S, CompuServe asked the game to be tied to MegaWars, which was a big hit, and the new version emerged as MegaWars III, II being a client-server version of the original MegaWars which was not released.

During the conversion, the game was greatly expanded. The maximum number of simultaneous players was increased from eight to 100, and the galaxy contained 1000 systems. However, another feature was lost; in S the player could close with an enemy ship in space and attempt to take it over, taking that ship's cargo if they were successful.

The game first went live on CIS on 19 January 1984, with this initial game running until 15 March. This was much longer than later games, which generally settled into a one-month period. From that point the game ran continually with only minor changes until 24 November 1999, when it no longer worked due to CIS turning off the "classic" text-mode interface which was needed to run the game.

=== Stellar Emperor ===
In 1985 Louden left CompuServe to form GEnie at General Electric (GE). Louden, who had been instrumental in setting up Kesmai on CIS, had convinced GE to start a similar service on their machines. Many of the Kesmai games were ported to the new systems, although with minor changes to the names and themes in keeping with the new service; MegaWars became Stellar Warrior, and MegaWars III became Stellar Emperor. Stellar Emperor was modified from the original, the most notable change being the removal of the ship customization system and its replacement with a fixed set of pre-rolled designs.

As was the case on CIS, the games became popular on GEnie and ran continually until GEnie was shut down in 1999. The game was saved from completely disappearing when Kesmai opened their own online service, GameStorm. Stellar Emperor ran on this service, but now used a 2D graphical client that made many of the interactive portions of the game a point-and-click affair. This did not save it for long; Electronic Arts purchased Kesmai in 1999, and shut the service down in 2001.

=== MegaWars III, The Rebirth ===
The loss of MegaWars III has let to a number of efforts to revive the game in various forms. MegaWars III, The Rebirth is a browser-based reincarnation of MegaWars III played on CompuServe and Stellar Emperor played on GEnie in the 1980s. Rebirth was created by David Baity, a well-known player of the original MegaWars III. Greatly enhanced performance eliminated all limitations to the number of players. Additionally, third-party applications could easily be integrated into the game and several have been written. The initial release of Rebirth took place in 2010.

== Description ==
MegaWars III is played through the terminal, using either a command-line interface or a character-graphics system that supported a wide variety of smart terminal standards. For slower links, the command line was commonly used, although the graphics version had a number of options to reduce the amount of data sent over the link.

The player assumes command of a spaceship at one of four starting planets, stated in-game to be the last remains of Earth's former empire. The galaxy measures 1000 by 1000 light-years and contains 2000 star systems. (Note: 2000 is from Version 3, earlier versions were smaller.) Using their ship, initially a "scout", the player explores other star systems looking for planets to colonize. Flight between stars uses warp drive through hyperspace, and on arrival, the ship returns to normal spacetime and uses impulse drives to move between the planets. Solar system layouts followed the basic model seen in the Earth's own, with rocky planets near the star and far from it, gas giants between, and most "good" locations closer to the sun. Typically a system had 4 to 12 planets and the inner 6 were worth examining. If a good planet is found, and the planet is currently unoccupied, the player can claim it for their own. Each player can claim up to six planets.

When a planet is claimed, 5000 colonists automatically arrive (out-of-game) and the colony begins to build out according to the game's internal economical rules. Upon reaching certain unstated thresholds, the planet becomes capable of building its own weapons and hosting a shipyard. At that point, the player can land their ship on the planet to perform upgrades. The player can also use the dockyards at the four original planets, but these are more expensive. Ship upgrades were based on the size of the parts and the amount of energy they used. The initial scout uses up all of both commodities, so to expand it the player must first add a new hull, a multi-purpose part. With this added room, they can then upgrade their power supply and then distribute that added power to various parts of the ship. Ships were classified by the number of hulls, for instance, a ship with 3 hulls is a scout, one with 6 to 11 is a cruiser.

Because the planets vary greatly in quality, competition over the best planets is fierce. A player can capture another player's planet by landing troops to overwhelm any defending troops on the planet using fighters that can also be used as shuttlecraft. Such an attempt is countered by any fighters on the planet as well anti-aircraft guns that are built as part of the planet's economic engine. These will shoot down any fighters being used for transport, so they must first be reduced by one or more waves of fighters alone. As the defending troops are being spawned by the game engine, they take time to be replaced even after a failed landing, so players can take over smaller defenses by repeatedly picking up new troops at their own planets or the imperial docks.

Ship-to-ship combat took place either in hyperspace using photon torpedoes similar to those in Star Trek, or using missiles. Torpedoes were fired along a fixed heading and had to be aimed at moving targets, while missiles followed a selected target at a fixed speed. In normal space, combat used lasers; lasers locked on and followed the target but could lose lock if the target flew out of view behind a planet or by moving into hyperspace. Adding hulls and power allowed the various systems to be upgraded, both the weapons and shields. Because the missiles and torpedoes were all the same, even small ships had some capability against larger ones, although the lower shield strength often led to short battles.

In-game money is in the form of raw metal, which is mined on the planets. The same metal is used to build the planet and ship parts, so the money available is a fixed amount of that mined which is controlled by the tax rate. Setting the rate higher takes a larger percentage of the metal to be set aside as money, but requires more people to collect it and thus reduces the rate of construction. Some planets have very high amounts of metal but are otherwise poor quality; these "metal planets" would be colonized, mined as quickly as possible, and then abandoned in favor of planets with higher growth potential. Additional money was generated by setting limits on the number of parts that would be stockpiled at the docks, with the excess being exported.

Points were awarded for population, money and successful combat. The point leader at the end of the game was named the Emperor while the team with the highest overall score was named the Court.
