= IF-16 =

1997 video game

iF-16
- Developer: Digital Integration
- Publisher: Interactive Magic
- Platform: Windows
- Release: September 1997
- Genre: Simulation

iF-16 is a 1997 video game developed by Digital Integration and published by Interactive Magic.

== Gameplay ==
iF-16 offers flight simulation experience with a detailed F-16C cockpit, including the LANTIRN infrared system. The game includes a mission editor, three campaigns (Korea, Cyprus, Israel), and multiple play modes—tutorials, scenarios, random missions. Multiplayer supports up to 16 players via IPX or modem.

== Reception ==
Reception

Review scores
Publication	Score
Computer Gaming World	2.5/5
GameSpot	7.1/10
Gamezilla	69%
PC Gamer	70%

Computer Gaming World gave the game a score of 2.5 out of 5 stating "iF-16 is essentially a marriage of the most often simulated combat aircraft in history with a slightly tweaked version of the APACHE/HIND engine. It brings almost nothing new to the table"

== See also ==
- iF-22
- iF/A-18E Carrier Strike Fighter
