= Kneeslappers =

Studio album by Huffamoose
- Released: 2004
- Genre: Alternative rock

Huffamoose chronology
I Wanna Be Your Pants (2000)	Kneeslappers (2004)	The Death of Cool (2004)

Kneeslappers is the fourth studio album by rock band Huffamoose. It was released digitally in 2004.

== Track list ==
No.	Title	Writer(s)	Length
1.	"I Can't Tell You About It"		5:36
2.	"Sometime"		3:59
3.	"Yes Man"		6:16
4.	"Sweet Thing"	Kevin Hanson	3:43
5.	"Fear of Change"		4:50
6.	"Stars Are Not"		3:51
7.	"Dying is a Foggy Dance"		3:39
8.	"Follow Me Home"		5:11
9.	"Sweet Thing" (Instrumental)	Kevin Hanson	3:44
10.	"Sweet Thing" (Alternate Recording)	Kevin Hanson
