= We've Been Had Again =

Studio album by Huffamoose
- Released: June 17, 1997
- Genre: Alternative rock
- Length: 41:54
- Label: Interscope

Huffamoose chronology
Huffamoose (1995)	We've Been Had Again (1997)	I Wanna Be Your Pants (2000)

Singles from We've Been Had Again
- 1. "Wait"

Professional ratings
Review scores
Source	Rating
AllMusic	4/5 stars
MusicHound Rock: The Essential Album Guide	3.5/5 stars

We've Been Had Again is an album by the American alternative rock band Huffamoose, released in 1997. The songs "Wait" and "James" were minor modern rock hits. The band supported the album by touring for a time with the 1998 H.O.R.D.E. Festival.

== Production ==
The band spent two years recording the album, while often disagreeing with its producers and label about the musical direction of the tracks. The album's original producer quit due to frustration over the band's fondness for jazz chords. The band finished We've Been Had Again at a studio in Ardmore, Pennsylvania, with the producer who had worked on its demo.

== Critical reception ==
The Hartford Courant wrote that "drummer Erik Johnson and guitarist Kevin Hanson, in particular, are inventive instrumentalists, and singer Craig Elkins breathes a measured soul into songs of postmodern angst." The Spokesman-Review deemed the album "so rich with guitar swaths and Jeff Buckley-like vocal dynamics, it takes more than one listen to truly plumb its depths."

The Wisconsin State Journal thought that the album "never sticks to a single style, tone, mood or perspective, and the results are unpredictable and satisfying." The St. Petersburg Times opined that Huffamoose's "dark, hip musical spirit invokes the style and imagery of Steely Dan."

== Track list ==
No.	Title	Writer(s)	Length
1.	"Wait"	Kevin Hanson	3:47
2.	"Enigmatic"	Craig Elkins	4:31
3.	"James"	Craig Elkins	4:57
4.	"We've Been Had Again"	Kevin Hanson	3:09
5.	"Like a Weed"	Craig Elkins	3:41
6.	"Shattered"	Kevin Hanson	3:38
7.	"Such a Good Look"	Craig Elkins	3:03
8.	"Speeding Bullet"	Craig Elkins	4:38
9.	"Snapshot Family"	Craig Elkins	3:57
10.	"Buy You a Ring"	Craig Elkins	4:17
11.	"Take You With"	Craig Elkins	2:16
