= IM1A2 Abrams =

1997 video game

iM1A2 Abrams
- Developer: Charybdis Enterprises
- Publisher: Interactive Magic
- Designer: Arnold Hendrick
- Platform: Microsoft Windows
- Release: March 23, 1997
- Genre: Tank simulation
- Modes: Single-player, multiplayer

iM1A2 Abrams is a simulation of the M1A2 Abrams main battle tank for the Windows 95 operating system, developed by Charybdis Enterprises, and published by Interactive Magic (also known as Imagic) in 1997. The game was released as a CD-ROM.

== Gameplay ==
iM1A2 Abrams is a simulation focusing on battlefield management as a tank commander controlling an entire company of support vehicles including infantry, artillery, and air strikes as well as the players' own tank platoon(s). Mastering the many company commands, and regular use of the real-time updated tactical map is essential for success. The player also has the ability to "jump" to each crew position (commander, gunner, driver) in every M1A2 vehicle on the battlefield and take control of each directly.

Three separate fictional campaigns are available to play: the Iranian (taking place in Iraq), Bosnian, and Ukrainian. All of the major eastern and western vehicle types were accurately modeled, and a fictional T-95 main battle tank was added to the mix to create more of a challenge for the somewhat superior M1A2 MBT.

== Development ==
The game's head designer was Arnold Hendrick, best known for designing M1 Tank Platoon. To help with the game's authenticity, Hendrick consulted with a number of contacts in General Dynamics and the United States Armed Forces, including a master gunnery sergeant who was actively training Saudis in the use of the MIA2.

== Reception ==
Publisher Interactive Magic shipped 100,000 copies of the game in preparation for its launch.

Next Generation rated it three stars out of five, and stated that "At times, it feels more like a job than a game. The designers went for keeping it true to life, and that means authenticity, not adrenaline."
