= IF-22 =

1997 combat flight simulator video game

iF-22
- Developer: Magic Labs
- Publisher: Interactive Magic
- Designer: Arnold Hendrick
- Platform: Windows
- Release: NA: July 18, 1997; EU: 1998
- Genre: Combat flight simulator
- Mode: Single-player

iF-22, sometimes known as iF-22 Raptor, iF-22: The F22 Raptor Simulator or iF-22 Air Superiority Fighter, is a video game developed by American studio Magic Labs and published by Interactive Magic for Windows. The game was first released in 1997. The game received an expansion pack, Persian Gulf, that included a new campaign. Later, a compilation was released containing the main and the expansion, titled iF-22 V5.0.

== Reception ==
Reception

Review scores
Publication	Score
CNET Gamecenter	7/10
Computer Games Strategy Plus	3/5
Computer Gaming World	3.5/5
GameRevolution	B
GameSpot	5.9/10
GameStar	71%
Next Generation	3/5
PC Gamer (US)	65%
PC PowerPlay	65%
PC Zone	75%

The game received average reviews. Next Generation said of the game, "There's a lot here for the casual pilot, and something for the flight fan, but for the hard-core sim purist, it's just not anything to shout about."

The game shipped more than 400,000 copies.

== See also ==
- iF-16
- iF/A-18E Carrier Strike Fighter
