= Decwar =

1978 video game

DECWAR is a multiplayer computer game first written in 1978 at the University of Texas at Austin for the PDP-10. It was developed from a lesser-known two-player version, WAR, adding multi-terminal support for between one and eighteen players. WAR and DECWAR are essentially multiplayer versions of the classic Star Trek game, but with added strategic elements. The game was later used, by scrubbing copyright notices and replacing them, as MegaWars on CompuServe and Stellar Warrior on GEnie. Both versions ran for years.

== History ==
=== Original versions ===
The original game that led to DECWAR was WAR, a two-player version of Star Trek for the CDC 6600. In Star Trek, a single player would hunt around the galaxy looking for an invasion force of Klingon warships, and return to a number of starbases to refit and repair. In WAR, the starbases were replaced by planets that either player could capture after attacking them, turning them "friendly". The game ended when one user captured all of the planets and destroyed his opponent's ship. The 6600 supported only one operating terminal, so the players had to take turns entering their commands.

During a port to the PDP-10 (also called DECsystem-10), the game was more heavily modified and became DECWAR. The game was no longer run as a single instance, but instead as a number of programs (or "jobs"), one for each user, communicating through a shared memory. This allowed up to 18 players to join or leave the game as they wished, the other players continuing to see the map as it was before. Another addition was a single computer-controlled Romulan ship, who would be spawned into games with less than full players in order to give the humans someone to fight. When the roster filled with players (the number depended on the version) the Romulan would not be re-spawned after being killed.

Version 1.0 of DECWAR was released in August 1978. The university would make copies available on tape for the nominal fee of $50, and it soon appeared on PDP-10s around the world. The greatly updated 2.0 was released in July 1979, and another major version, 2.3, on 20 November 1981.

=== Commercial versions ===
Bill Louden, who was in charge of games at CompuServe, purchased a version of DECWAR from UT Austin after having been told of its existence one night on CB Simulator by Merlyn Cousins. In 1982, Louden gave it to the programmers at Kesmai, who wrote many of CompuServe's games. They found that the copyright said nothing about commercial uses, and quickly produced a new version after replacing any potentially lawsuit-friendly references to the Star Trek universe with more generic references.

The new version, MegaWars, went live on CompuServe in 1983 and ran continuously until 1998, although there were a few times where they closed it down during that period only to revive it after receiving complaints from the players. Numerous additions were made during its run, notably different classes of ships, and later versions looked little like the original DECWAR.

Kesmai also worked on an extensively updated version to be known as MegaWars II, the original retroactively becoming MegaWars I. Among other features, MegaWars II was able to run in a client–server mode and was intended to be used with graphical front-ends running on a variety of popular home computers. However, the imminent release of MegaWars III ended these plans, and MegaWars II was abandoned.

In 1985 Louden left CompuServe to form GEnie at General Electric. Kesmai re-scrubbed the system for use on GEnie, producing Stellar Warrior. Like MegaWars, Stellar Warrior ran for years, and was finally killed when GEnie was shut down in 1999.

=== Other versions ===
In 1995 Harris Newman received an email with the source code modified by Compuserve. The license had requirements that required the University of Texas it's authors to give permission prior to distribution. Harris Newman arranged with the University of Texas to published this source code of Decwar. The source code is hosted at the Dolph Briscoe Center for American History and GitHub.

A clone of Decwar called decwars.com was written in Go by Harris Newman. Commands were modeled on the original game with minor variations, except the game supports unlimited players.

Later the CIS (CompuServe Information Service) version of Decwar was released to the public by The University of Texas. This version was highly modified to run on CIS's version of TOPS-10. Merlyn Cousins (Drforbin) later reverse engineered the source back to a form which would run on standard TOPS-10 and simh. This code is archived at the Briscoe Center for American History. The source is also available on GitHub.

== Description ==
The basic aim of DECWAR was to take control of a "universe" consisting of a 79 × 79 "sector" grid (in v2.3, it was smaller in earlier versions) containing a number of planets, bases and black holes. One change from the original Star Trek were the planets, which could be captured and fortified to create additional bases.

Players could join either the Federation or Klingon Empire, although the difference was purely cosmetic and each side had identical ships. In games where one team had too many players, new players would be forced onto the smaller team. When joining, the player was presented with a list of ships on each side that were not currently being played, and could re-enter the game in the same ship if they were killed. Each ship was equipped with warp and impulse engines, photon torpedoes, phasers, deflector shields, a computer, life support, sub-space radio, and a tractor beam. Each ship started with 5000 units of energy, 2500 units of shield strength, and 0 units of damage. If a ship receives 2500 points of damage it is destroyed, and a ship that loses all of its energy is likewise "dead". In addition to total damage for the ship as a whole, each hit would do damage to a part of the ship, which would be rendered inoperative if this reached 300 points.

Another change from Star Trek was that fully charged and operative shields would deflect torpedoes completely, whereas in the original they often overwhelmed the Klingon ships with a single shot. This forces the players to first reduce the enemy's shields with phaser fire before finishing them off with a torpedo. Players could also shoot at stars with their torpedoes, causing them to go nova and destroy any nearby ship.

The bases were the key strategic element of the game, allowing allied ships to be repaired and rearmed. The game ended when one team destroyed all of the opposing ships, bases, and captured their planets. Bases will fire on enemy ships within four sectors, and had massive phaser and shield power. Neutral planets were essentially small bases with a range of two sectors and less power. Bases and planets could be easily reduced by staying slightly outside their firing range; torpedoes, for instance, had a range of ten sectors.

Although, like Star Trek, each user interacted through a turn-based command line, the game as a whole was essentially real-time because any user could enter commands at any time and update the global game state. This gave the advantage to players who could interpret output and enter commands faster. To improve performance, DECWAR had three different levels of "detail" in commands and output, with the tersest mode condensing commands into a code-like format. Command structure was similar to the command structure of TOPS-10, the operating system for the PDP-10; commands could be abbreviated to their most simple and unique form. DECWAR allowed the user to enter coordinates in absolute, relative or computed format (one position +/- another). Finally, commands could be stacked on a line, allowing a list of commands to be executed at once. If the user wanted, the last command line could be re-entered by simply pressing the escape key.

== See also ==
- List of Star Trek games#Starship simulator games
