= American Civil War: From Sumter to Appomattox =

1996 video game

- Developer: Adanac Command Systems
- Publisher: Interactive Magic
- Platforms: Windows, Windows 3.x
- Release: NA: May 31, 1996
- Genres: Simulation, Strategy

American Civil War: From Sumter to Appomattox is a video game developed by the American studio Adanac Command Systems and published by Interactive Magic for Windows.

== Gameplay ==
American Civil War: From Sumter to Appomattox has hundreds of different statistical options for the player to use.

== Development ==
Interactive Magic and Adanac Command Systems collaborated on American Civil War: From Sumter to Appomattox, building from an earlier mail-order release by Adanac called The Road from Sumter to Appomattox II. Originally, the game was scheduled to be released in May. In mid-May 1996, Interactive Magic confirmed the game for a June launch date. The co-designer, Brian Davis, explained that the core "premise of the game is that you can take control of the south, win against insurmountable odds and effectively change the course of history". Edge noted that American Civil War was the only game published by Interactive Magic at the time to eschew 3D graphics.

== Reception ==
Reception

Review scores
Publication	Score
Next Generation	4/5
PC Games	C

Next Generation reviewed the PC version of the game, rating it four stars out of five, and stated that "While daunting to the historically (or statistically) challenged, American Civil War is a well-designed tactical simulation of one of the bloodiest conflicts in American history. Civil War experts should find it hard to resist." Computer Games Strategy Plus was similarly positive: "if you have any interest in simulating the strategic aspects of the War Between The States, or if you have a historical interest in that conflict, American Civil War deserves a place on your hard drive," the magazine's Jeff Lackey argued. However, writing for PC Games, Andrew Miller was let down by the game. He concluded, "I like the politics of running a country and a war just as much as the next guy, but in the end, war is about fighting, and its absence left me wanting."
