= I Wanna Be Your Pants =

Studio album by Huffamoose
- Released: July 11, 2000
- Genre: Alternative rock
- Label: Shanachie

Huffamoose chronology
We've Been Had Again (1997)	I Wanna Be Your Pants (2000)	Kneeslappers (2004)

Singles from I Wanna Be Your Pants
- 1. "My Dad's New Hit Song"

Professional ratings
Review scores
Source	Rating
AllMusic	4/5 stars
Houston Chronicle	C−
The Sun-Herald	6/10

I Wanna Be Your Pants is the third album by Huffamoose, released in 2000.

== Production ==
The album was recorded without founding drummer Erik Johnson.

== Critical reception ==
The Sun-Herald wrote that "at their prime, Philadelphia's Huffamoose deliver a reasonably punchy brand of melodic, stoner pop."

== Track list ==
No.	Title	Writer(s)	Length
1.	"My Dad's New Hit Song"	Craig Elkins	3:26
2.	"Zero Hours"	Craig Elkins	2:37
3.	"Isn't It Remarkable"	Kevin Hanson	4:07
4.	"She Don't Get It"	Craig Elkins	3:54
5.	"I Wanna Be Your Pants"	Kevin Hanson	4:06
6.	"Half Empty"	Kevin Hanson	3:40
7.	"Sunshine"	Craig Elkins	3:43
8.	"Canada"	Craig Elkins	4:20
9.	"Inspirational Song"	Craig Elkins	2:48
10.	"Johnny Depp Day"	Kevin Hanson	4:48
11.	"Sad in Your Eyes"	Craig Elkins	1:34
12.	"Him in a Magazine"	Craig Elkins	3:32
13.	"Beautiful Town"	Craig Elkins	3:03
14.	"Semper Fi"	Kevin Hanson	6:59
15.	"If You Lose Yourself" (Unlisted track)		3:42
