= North of South =

North of South may refer to:

- North of South (band), a Spanish metal band
- North of South, a 1978 travel book by Shiva Naipaul
