= Multiplayer BattleTech: Solaris =

1996 video game

- Developer(s): Kesmai
- Publisher(s): AOL, GameStorm
- Genre(s): MMORPG

Multiplayer BattleTech: Solaris is a version of the multiplayer BattleTech computer game which was available on AOL, and on Kesmai's (later named GameStorm) game service between 1996 and 2001. At its height on the AOL server, thousands of players competed simultaneously in arenas of two to eight participants, battling in team games or free-for-alls. After AOL initiated its hourly pay-for-play system, the majority of players moved to the GameStorm service, which operated for a number of years until its purchase by Electronic Arts.

During its run, the game's player-driven community grouped themselves into armies representing the various Successor States, or independent stables, or mercenary units. Though the in-game software did not support official groups, the player-driven units became close-knit communities, even after the games cancellation in 2001.

The game was a follow-up to Multiplayer BattleTech: EGA; it was in turn succeeded by Multiplayer BattleTech 3025.

== Reception ==
In 1997, Next Generation named Multiplayer BattleTech: Solaris as number two on their "Top 10 Online Game Picks", reasoning that "Kesmai's newest first-person BattleTech game may not have the glitz of MechWarrior 2, but it can stand on the same level - it is a more subtle, almost truer-to-life game ..." In 2000, Computer Games Strategy Plus named the Multiplayer Battletech series collectively one of the "10 Best Sci-Fi Simulations". The magazine's Steve Bauman called it "the definitive online BattleTech experience."

The game won a 1996 NewMedia Invision "Gold Award" for Best Online/Multi-user Game.

== See also ==
- MechWarrior
