= Semper fidelis (disambiguation) =

Semper fidelis is a Latin phrase that means "always faithful" – it serves globally as a common motto for several military units.

Semper fidelis may also refer to:

- Semper Fidelis (march), John Philip Sousa march
- Semper Fidelis, an album by German black metal band Nargaroth
- Semper Fidelis, first mission in the first-person shooter video game Battlefield 3
- Semper Fidelis Marine Corps, rename of computer game Söldner: Secret Wars

== Television ==
- "Semper Fidelis" (Daredevil)
- "Semper Fidelis", 1989 season 4 Growing Pains episode
- "Semper Fidelis" (Jericho episode), 2007 season 1 television episode
- "Semper Fidelis" (NCIS), 2008 season 6 television episode
- "Semper Fidelis", 1959 season 1 New York Confidential episode
- "Semper Fidelis", 1979 season 4 Quincy, M.E. episode

== See also ==
- Semper fi (disambiguation)
