= GameStorm =

Online gaming service

GameStorm was an online gaming service founded by Kesmai corporation in November 1997. It offered several online video games at a flat monthly fee of $10 per month, a relatively radical payment system in the age of pay-by-hour online gaming. Both Kesmai and GameStorm were sold to Electronic Arts in 1999, and shut down by Electronic Arts in 2001.

The impetus for the creation of GameStorm was AOL giving promotional control of AOL's Games channel to AOL subsidiary WorldPlay, a move which drastically changed the competition for the AOL market, resulting in a nearly 90% drop in revenue for Kesmai. Kesmai president Chris Holden said that nine months after this maneuver by AOL, "we still have more games on AOL than anyone, including WorldPlay. The problem is they are buried under WorldPlay's brand, and the control has been given over to WorldPlay." GameStorm was founded as a joint venture with Heat.net and Engage, with users granted access to services by all three companies.

GameStorm featured games developed by Kesmai, such as Air Warrior, Multiplayer Battletech: Solaris, Stellar Emperor and Legends of Kesmai, along with games developed by several other companies. Legends of Kesmai was the 2d graphical version of Kesmai's groundbreaking Islands of Kesmai MUD from 1985, and may be regarded as an important step in the genre leap from MUDs to MMORPGs. GameStorm's payment method was massively popular for the emerging persistent online gaming genres that rewarded players for time invested, but were too expensive for many people to pay $2/hour for on AOL or other gaming services. Mythic Entertainment (Now EA-Mythic), widely known for the Dark Age of Camelot MMORPG, was one of Gamestorms major developers. Mythic offered several licensed RPG and persistent non-RPG games to Gamestorm's library, including Dragon's Gate. Starship Troopers Battlespace, Magestorm, Aliens Online, Splatterball, Godzilla Online, Silent Death Online, Darkness Falls, and Darkness Falls: The Crusade.
