= Semper Fi (video game) =

1998 video game

- Developer: Stanley Associates
- Publisher: Interactive Magic
- Platform: Windows
- Release: February 1998
- Modes: Single-player, multiplayer

Semper Fi is a 1998 strategy video game developed by Stanley Associates and published by Interactive Magic.

== Gameplay ==
Semper Fi is a turn-based strategy game in which the player commands a Marine battalion. This platoon‑level, turn‑based wargame is set on a hex‑based map where each turn represents about seven minutes and each hex covers roughly 300 meters. Players control either U.S. Marine forces or Opposing Forces, using an action‑phase system in which initiative—driven by morale and readiness—determines which side acts during each phase. Units have limited activations per turn for movement or firing, and available movement and firing ranges are displayed directly on the map. Combat incorporates factors such as combined assaults, concentrated fire, terrain, morale, ammunition, leadership, command proximity, and support from off‑board assets like artillery and naval fire. The game includes scenario and AI editors that allow modification of computer behavior and creation of new missions. Built‑in content consists of 15 scenarios and three linked campaigns, with scenario outcomes based on casualty levels and objective completion. Campaigns progress through connected scenarios with some continuity of units. A full printed manual provides core instructions, while editor documentation is supplied in Adobe Acrobat format on the CD‑ROM.

== Development ==
The game was developed by Stanley Associates, a company founded in 1966.

== Reception ==
Reception

Review scores
Publication	Score
Computer Games Magazine	2/5
Computer Gaming World	3.5/5
GameSpot	6.8/10
PC Joker	39%
PC Gamer	75%

GameSpot gave the game a score of 6.8 out of 10 rating stating, "The truth of the matter is, if you can take the 'Semper Fi' slogan and the USMC logos and replace them with pretty much anything else, you'd still have nothing more than an OK game struggling to be something much better."
