= East West =

East West, East and West, or East vs. West may refer to:

== Arts and entertainment ==
=== Books, journals and magazines ===
- East, West, an anthology of short stories written by Salman Rushdie
- East and West, by C. Northcote Parkinson
- East and West (book), 1998, by Christopher Patten, the last British governor of Hong Kong
- East and West, a quarterly English-language journal published 1950 to 2009 by the Istituto Italiano per l'Africa e l'Oriente
- Ost und West, a German magazine

=== Film, TV and theatre ===
- East and West (film), a 1923 Austrian silent drama
- East/West (also known as Est-Ouest), a 1999 film by Régis Wargnier
- East West Players, an Asian American theatre organization
- East West 101, an Australian television drama series
- Purab Aur Pachhim (East and West), a 1970 Bollywood movie
- "East/West" (Fargo), a television episode
- Celebrity Chef: East vs West, a television show

=== Music ===
- East-West (The Butterfield Blues Band album), 1966
- East West (Julia Fordham album), 1997
- East West (East West album), 2003
- East/West (album), 2005, by Bill Frisell
- East West (band), a Christian metal band
- East and West (album), a 1963 jazz album by Toshiko Akiyoshi and Charlie Mariano
- East West Records, an American record label
- "East West", a 1966 single by Herman's Hermits, later covered by Morrissey
- "East West", a 1988 single by Jay Strongman

=== Games ===
- East vs. West: Berlin 1948, a 1989 video game
- East vs. West – A Hearts of Iron Game, a cancelled video game

== Companies and institutions ==
- East-West Airlines (India), a former airline
- East-West Airlines (Australia), a former airline
- East West Bank, a Chinese American bank in California
- East West Bus Company, a bus and coach operator in Melbourne, Australia
- East-West Seed, a vegetable seed company
- East West University, Dhaka, Bangladesh
- East–West University, Chicago, Illinois, US
- East and West Railroad of Alabama, a railroad in the US states of Alabama and Georgia
- East and West Riding Regiment, British Territorial Army
- EastWest Bank, a Philippine commercial bank
- EastWest Institute (EWI), a former international conflict resolution not-for-profit
- EastWest Sounds, an American company that develops and markets virtual instruments
- EastWest Studios, a recording studio in Hollywood, California, US

== Other uses ==
- The East–West dichotomy, the contrast between Eastern and Western society or culture
- East–West cultural debate, historical Chinese debate on East vs West
- Two of the four cardinal directions
- A prime vertical direction
- East–West Highway (New England), a proposed highway corridor
- East West Line (disambiguation)
- The East–West Schism, the 1054 break between the Roman Catholic and Eastern Orthodox churches
- East–West Shrine Game, an annual college football game
- East–west traffic, computer network traffic within a data center
- USAFL East vs West, an Australian rules football tournament

== See also ==
- West and East, a 2010 alternate history book by Harry Turtledove
- East Coast–West Coast hip hop rivalry, a 1990s feud between American hip hop enthusiasts
- East Germany–West Germany football rivalry
- Philosophy East and West, an international, interdisciplinary academic journal
- North and South (disambiguation)
