= Air Warrior III =

1997 video game

- Developer: Kesmai
- Publishers: NA: Interactive Magic; EU: Midas Interactive Entertainment
- Platform: Windows
- Release: NA: December 15, 1997; EU: 1997
- Genre: Combat flight simulator
- Modes: Single-player, multiplayer

Air Warrior III, known as Air Warrior 3 in Europe, is a video game developed by Kesmai Studios and published by Interactive Magic and Midas Interactive Entertainment for Microsoft Windows in 1997. The game had been scheduled to be released in January 1998, before being pushed forward for December 15, 1997.

== Gameplay ==
Air Warrior III screenshot

Air Warrior III had as one playing area a map of northern Europe, besides many small playing fields with some real-life features labeled. Berlin, the Kiel Canal, and Peenemünde were unmarked in the game. There was also a playing area map that included a hodgepodge of Pacific islands and the coast of Australia. The player could design custom missions on any of these playing fields. Fans of the online competition developed a tool that enabled the players to paint their own aircraft. Screenshots could be taken in combat, and even videos, which could be distributed over the Internet. Douglas C-47s could be used to carry paratroops to take enemy air bases.

There were many ships and a few buildings to attack, including V-2s at Peenemünde, a bridge near Westminster's Parliament House, and the Brandenburg Gate of Berlin. However, targets that were destroyed soon re-appeared. Besides aircraft, the player could control a Jeep, a tank, a truck, or a Flakpanzer. The player could also drive through the fence surrounding after destroying it with a tank. The aircraft carriers and other ships were fixed at their places.

== Reception ==
Reception

Aggregate score
Aggregator	Score
GameRankings	76%

Review scores
Publication	Score
AllGame	3.5/5
Computer Games Strategy Plus	3/5
Computer Gaming World	3.5/5
GameRevolution	C
GameSpot	7.3/10
GameStar	65%
Génération 4	3/6
Next Generation	3/5
PC Gamer (US)	86%
PC Zone	80%

The game received favorable reviews according to the review aggregation website GameRankings. Next Generation was generally positive despite noting a bug when using Sound Blaster AWE32 and Sound Blaster AWE64 cards and the lack of online features in the retail product, saying that the game has an incredibly realistic flight engine and a huge number of missions to fly.

Air Warrior III was named as a finalist by the Academy of Interactive Arts & Sciences for "Online Action/Strategy Game of the Year" at the 2nd Annual Interactive Achievement Awards, which ultimately went to Starsiege: Tribes.
