= Island of Kesmai =

- Developer: Kesmai
- Publisher: CompuServe
- Release: 1985
- Genre: Fantasy MUD
- Mode: Multiplayer

Legends of Kesmai
- Developer: Kesmai
- Publishers: AOL, GameStorm
- Release: 1996
- Genre: Fantasy MUD
- Mode: Multiplayer

Island of Kesmai is a discontinued multi-user dungeon (MUD) online game. An early entry in the genre, the game was innovative in its use of roguelike pseudo-graphics. It is considered a major forerunner of modern massively multiplayer online role-playing games (MMORPGs).

== Launch date ==
In the summer of 1980 University of Virginia classmates John Taylor and Kelton Flinn wrote Dungeons of Kesmai, a six player game inspired by Dungeons & Dragons which used Roguelike ASCII graphics. They founded the Kesmai company in 1982 and in 1985 an enhanced version of Dungeons of Kesmai, Island of Kesmai, was launched on CompuServe. Later, its 2-D graphical descendant Legends of Kesmai was launched on AOL in 1996. The games were retired commercially in 2000.

== Price to play ==
The game was available on CompuServe for no additional charge, but CompuServe charged $6 per hour for 300 baud or $12 per hour for 1200 baud access rates. The game processed one command every 10 seconds, which equates to 1 2/3 cents per command. Players could also order an optional 181-page game manual from Compuserve for $16.50.

== Game characteristics ==
After logging into Compuserve and selecting to play Island of Kesmai, the user was allowed to create a character. After creating a character, the next step was to enter the chat room. From the chat room, the user could enter the virtual world.

The game interface was two dimensional and scrolled unless you downloaded and installed a GUI. The interface has often been called roguelike in that it borrowed features of game-play from a game called Rogue. The game used a Dungeons & Dragons-like turn-based play. Players moved in tiles on a grid utilizing short commands or key presses. Items could be found on the floor of the dungeon as symbols — as could mobs to fight.

The game let players complete quests for rewards.[3] The questing system has been described as an early example of those later used in MMORPGs such as EverQuest and World of Warcraft.

=== Setting ===
The island of Kesmai was divided into five regions that totalled 62,000 discrete locations, was populated by 2500 creatures and non-player characters, and could support up to 100 simultaneous players.

In 1988, with many players approaching the maximum character level, the new lands of Torii and Annwn were introduced. Promotional material promised "more powerful weapons, tougher monsters, and a variety of treasures". Players could only travel to those lands when they had reached the island's maximum character level, and once they had travelled to the new regions, they could never return to the island.

== Legends of Kesmai ==
Legends of Kesmai (LOK) was among the first successful graphical multi-player online role-playing games. It was based on a slightly stripped down version of Island of Kesmai with 2D sprites replacing IoK's roguelike pseudo-graphics, and was available for play at America Online and GameStorm. Prior to that, Kesmai corporation ran a long open beta for the game, as well as hosting the game for a short period of time in the mid 1990s. In 1999 Electronic Arts bought Kesmai and in 2000 closed the business.

== Reception ==
Patricia Fitzgibbons reviewed the game for Computer Gaming World, and stated that "even telegamers who have become jaded with D&D-type programs perk up when they're adventuring with a party of real people. The best MP games allow players to interact and cooperate as well as compete with one another. IOK is a prime example of this facility".

In the December 1987 edition of Dragon (Issue 128), Cheryl Peterson gave an in-depth examination of the game, noting it could be used by "anyone with a personal computer and a modem" and that it was unique at that point in time due to the interaction between players. She also noted that this was a game where "there is no real winner in any session. The point is for players to enjoy themselves and have fun".
