= Air Warrior (video game) =

- Developer: Kesmai
- Publisher: Konami (Air Warrior SVGA)
- Platforms: Windows, 3DO, Amiga, Atari ST, CDTV, FM Towns, Mac OS
- Release: 1987
- Genre: Air combat simulation
- Modes: Single-player, multiplayer

Air Warrior is a discontinued multiplayer online combat flight simulation game launched by Kesmai in 1987. It was hosted on GEnie and used that service as a server for client software running on a variety of personal computers. It underwent continual improvement through its decade-long lifetime with Kesmai, appearing on new platforms and host services. Electronic Arts purchased Air Warrior in 1999, and became provider of the game, but it was discontinued in 2001. Sequels Air Warrior II and Air Warrior III were both released in 1997 and published by Interactive Magic.

Air Warrior was one of the first massive online games, hosting hundreds of users during busy periods. It inspired WarBirds, which in turn inspired Aces High, while other members of the Warbirds team went on to produce World War II Online. Today there are a number of similar games, like WarThunder, most of them based on a freemium model.

== History ==
Introduced in 1988 by Kesmai, Air Warrior was played over modems and hosted on the GEnie online service provider. Players could choose one of a number of World War II aircraft to fly, along with ground vehicles, and play in a multiplayer "arena" with hundreds of other players. The game focused mostly on dogfighting, with a secondary strategic role of capturing forward airbases near the center of the map. Several updated versions were released, and additional service providers were added over time.

The original version of Air Warrior ran on Apple Macintosh, Commodore Amiga, and Atari ST computers, had simple black and white wireframe graphics, and cost over $10 per hour to play. Over time, Kesmai produced improved versions of the game, starting with SVGA Air Warrior in 1993, and continuing with Air Warrior for Windows in 1996, Air Warrior II in early 1997, Air Warrior III later in 1997, and finally Air Warrior III Millennium Version in 2000. Development of Air Warrior II was directly overseen by Bill Stealey, founder of the game's publisher, Interactive Magic.

Kesmai also did business deals to provide access to Air Warrior through additional on-line services, including Delphi, CRIS, CompuServe, America Online, Earthlink, Gamestorm and CompuLink. A version of Air Warrior for Windows was ported back to the Macintosh in 1997 in an Internet open beta, and then later moved to America Online. In 1999, Electronic Arts purchased Air Warrior, and became provider of the latest version of the game, only to discontinue it in 2001.

== Reception ==
Computer Gaming World in 1990 called Air Warrior "the most exciting [wargame] I've played", warning players to "be resigned to spending some money on it, though, because time flies while you do". 1991 and 1993 surveys in the magazine of strategy and war games gave it three and a half stars out of five. The magazine in 1993 praised the flight models' accuracy, stating that it forced pilots to choose correctly when selecting aircraft to fly against other humans. The magazine suggested that if Kesmai were to add some upgrades to the offline single-player mode it would "blow away any of the competition". In a 1994 survey of wargames the magazine gave the title four stars out of five, noting its high cost but reporting that it was "continually being revised and updated".

In 1997 Next Generation named Air Warrior as number six on their "Top 10 Online Game Picks". They noted that Air Warrior provided a multiplayer flight sim online with a persistent environment.

== Sources ==
- Anderson, Brooke P. (1997). How to Fly and Fight in Air Warrior, Appendix: History of Air Warrior.
- Air Warrior II at MobyGames
- Brooks, M. Evan (2001). - dates of release for some versions of Air Warrior.
- Book of MacDweeb, 1999, a satirical history of Air Warrior for Macintosh in the spirit of the Wingless Cafe.
