= Multiplayer BattleTech: EGA =

1991 video game

- Developer: Kesmai
- Publisher: GEnie
- Platform: PC online
- Release: 1991
- Genre: MMORPG

Multiplayer BattleTech is a PC MMORPG BattleTech game developed by Kesmai and featured on the now defunct GEnie online gaming network.

== Gameplay ==
It featured a text-based chat component for roleplaying, team development and battle planning and a 3D battle simulator component. The game engine was based on a heavily modified version of the original MechWarrior. Multiplayer BattleTech was followed by Multiplayer BattleTech: Solaris.

== Reception ==
Reception

Review score
Publication	Score
Computer Gaming World	4/5

Award
Publication	Award
Computer Gaming World	Online Game of the Year, June 1994

Computer Gaming World in 1993 stated that "fans of MechWarrior will not want to miss this next generation of the classic simulation ... both addicting and satisfying". A 1994 survey of strategic space games set in the year 2000 and later gave the game four stars out of five, stating that "the licensed BattleTech universe is put to good use here ... the long-term satisfaction of role-playing combined with the quick-playing thrill of a simulation".

In June 1994 Multiplayer BattleTech won Computer Gaming World's "Online Game of the Year" award. The editors called it a simulation that looks like Activision's classic MechWarrior, but performs significantly better with real human 'mech pilots on player's flanks.
