= North vs. South: The Great American Civil War =

1999 video game

- Developer: Erudite Software
- Publisher: Interactive Magic
- Release: 1999
- Genre: Computer Wargame

North vs. South: The Great American Civil War is a 1999 computer wargame developed by Erudite Software and published by Interactive Magic.

== Development ==
=== Origins ===
Following the March 1998 release of developer Erudite Software's The Great Battles of Caesar, rumors spread inside the game industry that publisher Interactive Magic intended to reuse the Great Battles game engine for another project. Speculation arose initially that it would take place in feudal Japan. In June, this new game was revealed under the tentative title Rally Round the Flag, under development again by Erudite. Designed by S. Craig Taylor, who had produced the Great Battles series and designed the board wargame Wooden Ships and Iron Men, the game was announced as a Civil War-era computer wargame with a release date of October 1998. Despite using an upgraded version of Great Battles' technology, the game could not be marketed under the series' name for legal reasons: while Erudite's earlier titles were adaptations of GMT Games board products, Rally was not. In early July, Rally Round the Flag was renamed North vs. South: The Eastern Campaigns of the Civil War.

=== Production ===
Erudite created only the art and code for North vs. South; Interactive Magic researched, designed and published the game. Although Taylor was a Civil War history enthusiast, and had worked on eight physical games set during the period, North vs. South was his first return to the topic since designing the 1988 version of Gettysburg.

== Reception ==
Reception

Review scores
Publication	Score
Computer Games Strategy Plus	3.5/5
Computer Gaming World	1.5/5
CNET Gamecenter	8/10

CNET Gamecenter rated the game 8/10, and Computer Gaming World gave it a 2 and a half star rating.
