= Kesmai =

American publisher of video games (1981–2001)

- Type: Subsidiary
- Industry: Video games
- Founded: 1981; 45 years ago
- Founders: Kelton Flinn; John Taylor
- Defunct: 2001; 25 years ago
- Fate: Dissolved
- Parent: News Corp. (1994–1999); Electronic Arts (1999–2001)

Kesmai was a pioneering game developer and online game publisher, founded in 1981 by Kelton Flinn and John Taylor. The company was best known for the combat flight sim Air Warrior on the GEnie online service, one of the first graphical MMOGs, launched in 1987. They also developed an ASCII-based MUD, Island of Kesmai, and empire building game, MegaWars III, which ran on CompuServe, and later, GEnie.

== History ==
The company was acquired by Rupert Murdoch's News Corp. in 1994. The company continued to develop massively multiplayer games such as Air Warrior 2 and Legends of Kesmai. They distributed their games through AOL and eventually a new gaming service formed with three other publishers, GameStorm.

AOL purchased CompuServe in 1997 and retooled its AOL Games Channel in a way that placed Kesmai unfavorably compared to its own games division, WorldPlay. Kesmai sued AOL for monopolistic practices. The suit was settled out of court with undisclosed terms.

In 1999, the company was sold to Electronic Arts, and the company's studios were subsequently closed in 2001. Upon closure a number of the Kesmai staff went to work for Lodestone Games, also located in Charlottesville, Virginia; while others remained in the former Kesmai offices but became part of EA.com and later Maxis East.

Flinn selected the name Kesmai from a set of names that were output by a random name generator that he wrote for in-game use.

== Games ==
Year	Title	Platform(s)	Notes
Developed titles
1982	MegaWars	Terminal	
1984	MegaWars III	Terminal	
1988	Air Warrior	Terminal	
1990	Air Warrior	Amiga	
1991	Air Warrior	Atari ST	
1992	Air Warrior	CDTV	
1992	Air Warrior	DOS	
1996	MultiPlayer BattleTech: Solaris	Microsoft Windows	
1997	Air Warrior II	Microsoft Windows	
1997	Air Warrior III	Microsoft Windows	
1997	CatchWord	Microsoft Windows	Assisted Ant Software
1997	Legends of Kesmai	Microsoft Windows	
1998	Aliens Online	Microsoft Windows	Assisted Mythic Entertainment
Published titles
1998	Starship Troopers: Battlespace	Microsoft Windows	
1999	Fierce Harmony	Microsoft Windows	
