= IEntertainment Network =

American video game company

- Founded: 1995
- Number of employees: 19 (2001)

IEntertainment Network (IENT, stylized as iEntertainment Network and formerly known as Interactive Magic, iMagic, and iMagiconline) is an American video game company founded by Bill Stealey, the co-founder and former CEO of MicroProse Software, in 1995. It is chiefly a developer and publisher of simulation computer games.

The company was noted for hiring many industry outsiders, i.e. skilled software engineers with no prior experience in making games. Interactive Magic went public in 1998 and was sold to a venture capitalist in 1999, when Bill Stealey left the company; Stealey returned in the early 2000s.

== Games published ==
- Air Warrior II
- Air Warrior III
- American Civil War: From Sumter to Appomattox
- Apache
- Capitalism
- Destiny: World Domination from Stone Age to Space Age
- Fallen Haven
- Hind
- iPanzer '44
- iF-16
- iF-22
- iF/A-18E Carrier Strike Fighter
- iM1A2 Abrams
- Industry Giant
- Knights and Merchants: The Shattered Kingdom
- Liberation Day
- North vs. South: The Great American Civil War
- Seven Kingdoms
- Spearhead
- Star Rangers
- Semper Fi
- The Great Battles (series)
- Thunder Brigade
- Vangers
- War Inc.
- WarBirds (series)
