= 2000s =

Decade of the Gregorian calendar (2000–2009)

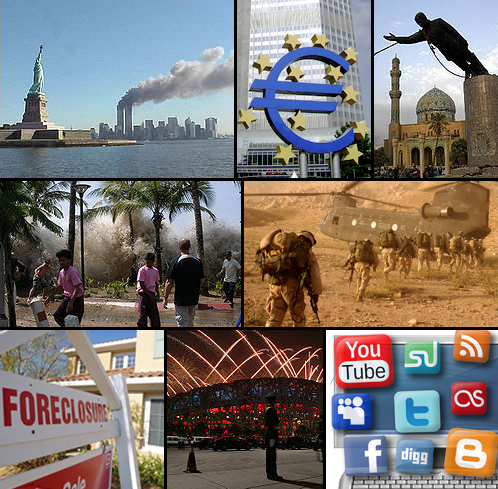
Clockwise from top-left: The Twin Towers of the original World Trade Center burning and the Statue of Liberty on the left during the terrorist attacks on September 11, 2001; The euro enters into European currency in 2002; A statue of Saddam Hussein being toppled during the Iraq War in 2003, and in 2006, Saddam would be executed for crimes against humanity; U.S. troops heading toward an army helicopter in Afghanistan as part of the war on terror; Social media platforms and the internet become widely popular; A Chinese soldier gazes at the 2008 Summer Olympics commencing in Beijing; The 2008 financial crisis, the largest financial crisis since the Great Depression; A tsunami from the Indian Ocean earthquake kills over 230,000 in 2004, and becomes the strongest earthquake since the 1964 Alaska earthquake.

The 2000s (pronounced "two-thousands"; shortened to the '00s) was the decade that began on January 1, 2000, and ended on December 31, 2009.

During this decade, the world population grew from 6.1 to 6.9 billion people. Approximately 1.35 billion people were born, and 550 million people died. The early part of the decade saw the long-predicted breakthrough of economic giants in Asia, like India and China, which had double-digit growth during nearly the whole decade. These two most populous countries became an increasing economic force. The rapid catching-up of emerging economies with developed countries sparked protectionist tensions during the period and was partly responsible for an increase in energy and food prices at the end of the decade. The economic developments towards the end of the decade were dominated by a worldwide economic downturn, which started with the crisis in housing and credit in the US in 2007 and led to the bankruptcy of major banks and other financial institutions. The outbreak of the 2008 financial crisis sparked the Great Recession, beginning in the United States and affecting most of the industrialized world.

The decade saw the rise of the Internet, which grew from covering 7% to 26% of the world population. This contributed to globalization, which allowed faster communication among people around the world; social networking sites arose as a new way for people to stay in touch from distant locations, as long as they had internet access. Myspace was the most popular social networking website until June 2009, when Facebook overtook it in number of American users. Email continued to be popular and began to replace "snail mail" as the primary way of sending messages to people. Google, YouTube, Ask.com and Wikipedia emerged to become among the top 10 most popular websites. Amazon overtook eBay as the most-visited e-commerce site in 2008. AOL significantly declined in popularity throughout the decade, falling from being the most popular website to no longer being within the top 10. Excite and Lycos fell outside the top 10, and MSN fell from second to sixth. Yahoo! maintained relatively stable popularity, remaining the most popular website for most of the decade.

The war on terror and War in Afghanistan began after the September 11 attacks in 2001. The International Criminal Court was formed in 2002. In 2003, a United States-led coalition invaded Iraq, and the Iraq War led to the end of Saddam Hussein's rule as Iraqi President and the Ba'ath Party. Al-Qaeda and affiliated Islamist militant groups performed terrorist acts throughout the decade. The war on terror exacerbated global autocratization. The Second Congo War, the deadliest conflict since World War II, ended in 2003. Further wars that ended included the Algerian Civil War, the Angolan Civil War, the Sierra Leone Civil War, the Second Liberian Civil War, the Nepalese Civil War, and the Sri Lankan Civil War. Wars that began included the conflict in the Niger Delta, the Houthi insurgency, and the Mexican drug war.

Climate change and global warming became common concerns in the 2000s. Prediction tools made significant progress, UN-sponsored organizations such as the IPCC gained influence, and studies such as the Stern Review influenced public support for paying the political and economic costs of countering climate change. The global temperature kept climbing during the decade. In December 2009, the World Meteorological Organization (WMO) announced that the 2000s may have been the warmest decade since records began in 1850, with four of the five warmest years since 1850 having occurred in this decade. The WMO's findings were later echoed by the NASA and the NOAA. Major natural disasters included Cyclone Nargis in 2008 and earthquakes in Pakistan and China in 2005 and 2008, respectively. The deadliest natural disaster (Note: Pandemics, such as the COVID-19 pandemic, are typically classified in their own category whilst natural disasters include earthquakes, storms, volcanic eruptions, floods, etc.) and most powerful earthquake of the 21st century occurred in 2004 when a 9.1–9.3 M_{w} earthquake and its subsequent tsunami struck multiple nations in the Indian Ocean, killing 230,000 people.

Usage of computer-generated imagery became more widespread in films produced during the 2000s, especially with the success of 2001's Shrek and 2003's Finding Nemo, the latter becoming the best-selling DVD of all time. Anime films gained more exposure outside Japan with the release of Spirited Away. 2009's Avatar became the highest-grossing film. Documentary and mockumentary films, such as March of the Penguins, Super Size Me, Borat and Surf's Up, were popular in the 2000s. 2004's Fahrenheit 9/11 by Michael Moore was the highest grossing documentary of all time. Online films became popular, and conversion to digital cinema started. Video game consoles released in this decade included the PlayStation 2, Xbox, GameCube, Wii, PlayStation 3 and Xbox 360; while portable video game consoles included the Game Boy Advance, Nintendo DS and PlayStation Portable. Wii Sports was the decade's best-selling console video game, while New Super Mario Bros. was the decade's best-selling portable video game. J. K. Rowling was the best-selling author thanks to the Harry Potter book series, although she did not pen the best-selling individual book, being second to The Da Vinci Code. Eminem was named the music artist of the decade by Billboard.

== Name for the decade ==
Orthographically, the decade can be written as the "2000s" or the "'00s". In the English-speaking world, a name for the decade was not immediately accepted as it had been for other decades such as the 1980s and 1990s ('80s, '90s).

The aughts (American English) or noughties (British English) arise from the words aught and nought respectively, both meaning zero. The noughties became a common name for the decade in the United Kingdom and in New Zealand and Australia.

Although use of the word aught to refer to zero is not widespread in the United States, the use of aughts to identify the decade became common there.

Other spoken-word possibilities included "two-thousands", "twenty hundreds", "ohs", "oh ohs", "double ohs", "zeros", and "double zeros". The years of the decade can be referred to as '01, '02, '03, etc., pronounced oh-one, oh-two, oh-three, etc.

== Demographics ==
Year	United States Census Bureau (2017)	Population Reference Bureau (1973–2016)	United Nations Department of Economic and Social Affairs (2015)	Maddison (2008)	HYDE (2007)
2000	6,088,571,383	6,067,000,000	6,127,700,428	6,076,558,000	6,145,000,000
2001	6,165,219,247	6,137,000,000	6,204,147,026	6,154,791,000	
2002	6,242,016,348	6,215,000,000	6,280,853,817	6,231,704,000	
2003	6,318,590,956	6,314,000,000	6,357,991,749	6,308,364,000	
2004	6,395,699,509	6,396,000,000	6,435,705,595	6,374,056,000	
2005	6,473,044,732	6,477,000,000	6,514,094,605	6,462,987,000	
2006	6,551,263,534	6,555,000,000	6,593,227,977	6,540,214,000	
2007	6,629,913,759	6,625,000,000	6,673,105,937	6,616,689,000	
2008	6,709,049,780	6,705,000,000	6,753,649,228	6,694,832,000	
2009	6,788,214,394	6,809,972,000	6,834,721,933	6,764,086,000 (projected)	

== Politics and wars ==
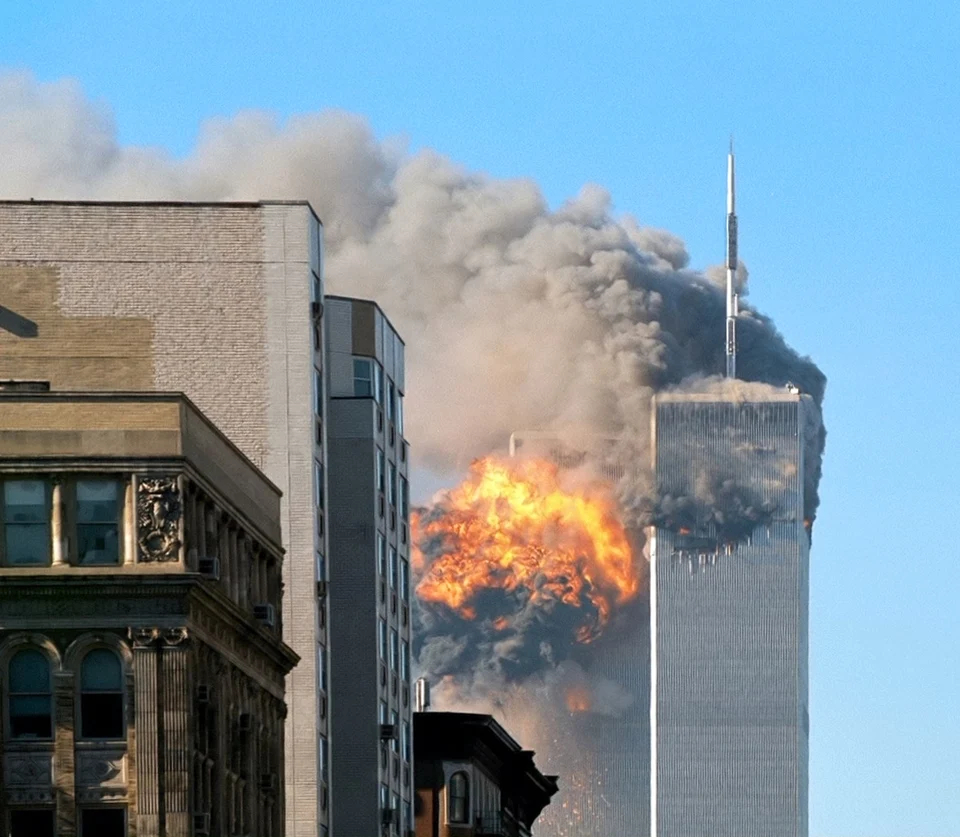
United Airlines Flight 175 striking the South Tower of the World Trade Center on September 11, 2001

The war on terror and War in Afghanistan began after the September 11 attacks in 2001. The International Criminal Court was formed in 2002. In 2003 a United States-led coalition invaded Iraq, and the Iraq War led to the end of Saddam Hussein's rule as Iraqi President and the Ba'ath Party in Iraq. Al-Qaeda and affiliated Islamist militant groups performed terrorist acts throughout the decade. These acts included the 2004 Madrid train bombings, 7/7 London bombings in 2005, and the 2008 Mumbai attacks related to al-Qaeda. The European Union expanded its sanctions amid Iran's failure to comply with its transparency obligations under the Treaty on the Non-Proliferation of Nuclear Weapons and United Nations resolutions.

The war on terror generated extreme controversy around the world, with questions regarding the justification for certain U.S. actions leading to a loss of support for the American government, both in and outside the United States. The additional armed conflict occurred in the Middle East, including between Israel and Hezbollah, then with Israel and Hamas. The most significant loss of life due to natural disasters came from the 2004 Indian Ocean earthquake, which caused a tsunami that killed around one quarter-million people and displaced well over a million others.

=== Terrorist attacks ===
The most prominent terrorist attacks committed against the civilian population during the decade include:

- September 11 attacks in New York City; The Pentagon in Arlington County, Virginia, Washington, D.C.; and Shanksville, Pennsylvania (nearly 3,000 killed)
- 2001 anthrax attacks in the United States (5 killed, 17 infected)
- 2002 Moscow theater hostage crisis in Russia (171 killed)
- 2002 Bali bombings in Indonesia (202 killed)
- 2003 Casablanca bombings in Morocco (45 killed)
- 2003 Istanbul bombings in Turkey (57 killed)
- 2004 Madrid train bombings in Spain (192 killed)
- 2004 Beslan school hostage crisis in Russia (334 killed)
- 2005 London bombings in England (56 killed)
- 2007 Yazidi communities bombings in Iraq (796 killed)
- 2008 Mumbai attacks in India (175 killed)
- 2009 Boko Haram uprising in Nigeria (1000+ killed)

=== Wars ===
The most prominent armed conflicts of the decade include:

==== International wars ====
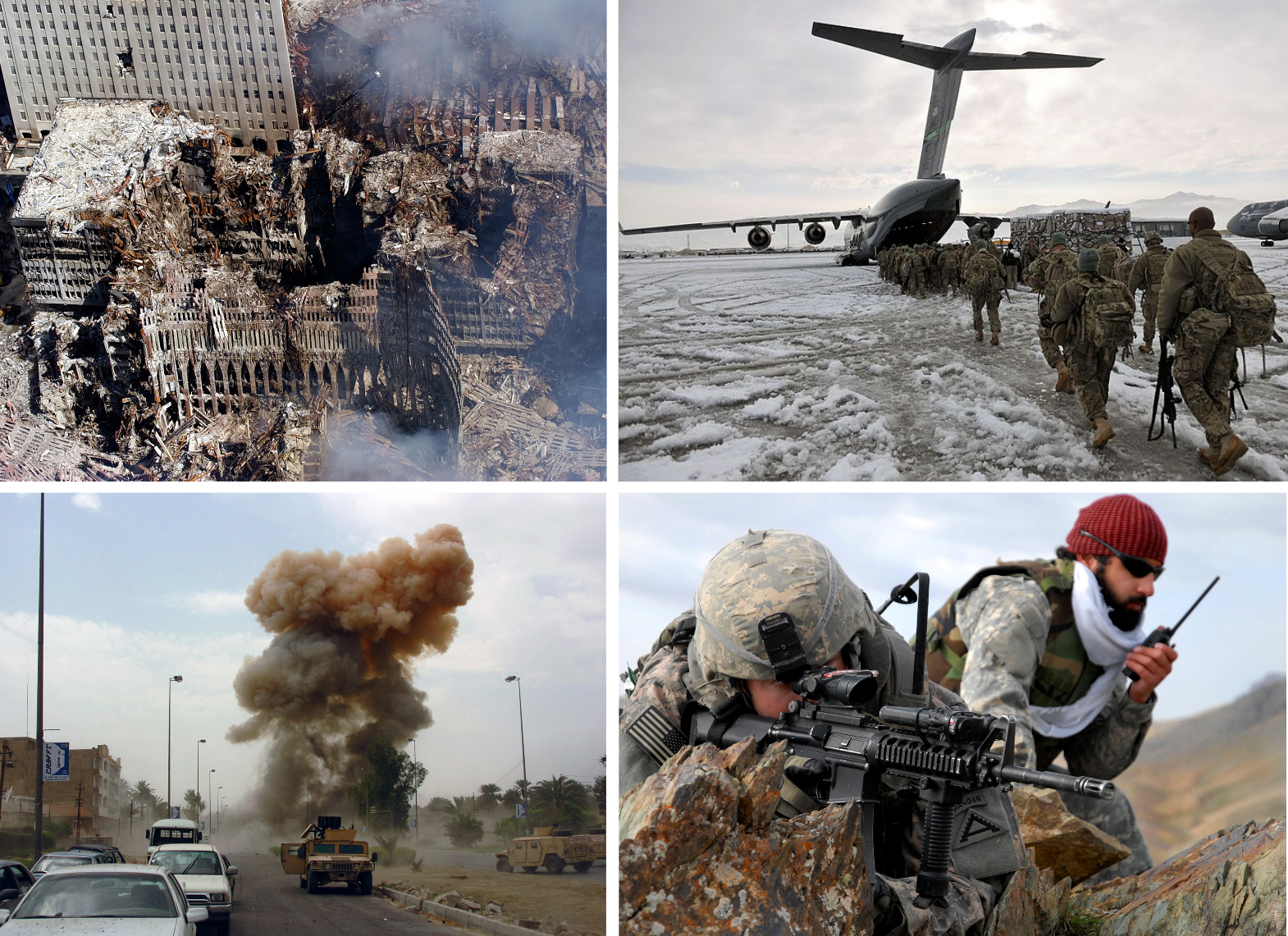
The war on terror

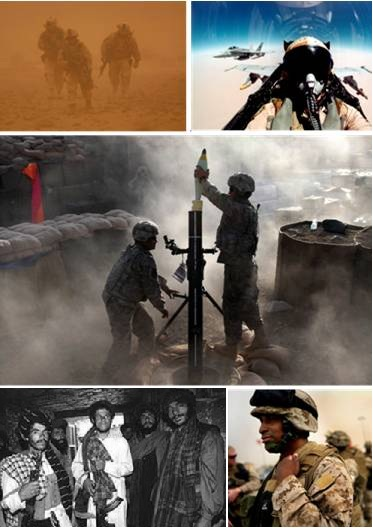
The War in Afghanistan

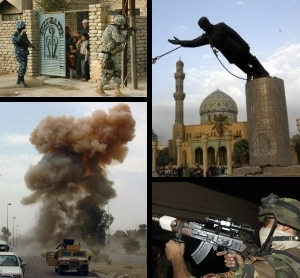
The Iraq War

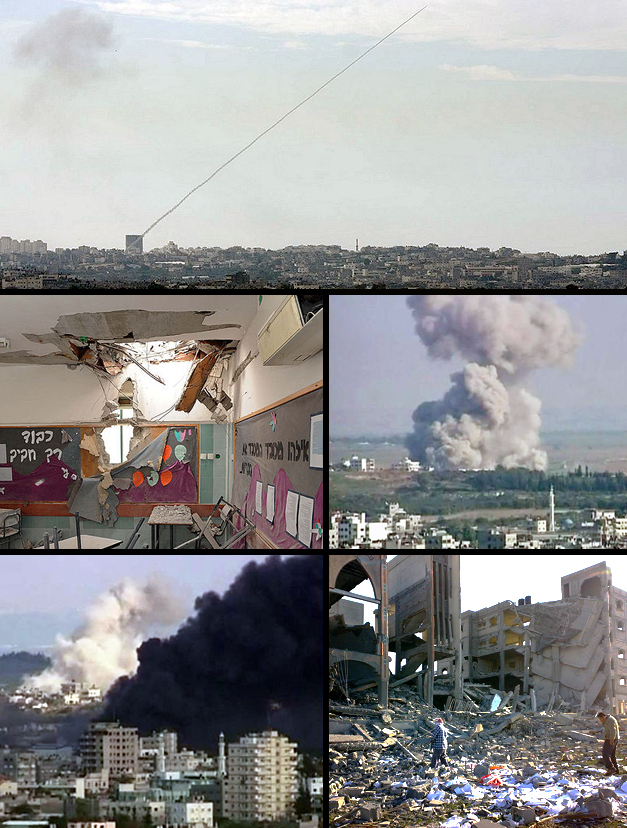
The Gaza War (2008–2009)

- War on terror (2001–present) – refers to several ideological, military, and diplomatic campaigns aimed at putting an end to international terrorism by preventing groups defined by the U.S. and its allies as terrorist (mostly Islamist groups such as al-Qaeda, Hezbollah, and Hamas) from posing a threat to the U.S. and its allies, and by putting an end to state sponsorship of terrorism. The campaigns were launched by the United States, with support from NATO and other allies, following the September 11 attacks that were carried out by al-Qaeda. Today the term has become mostly associated with Bush administration-led wars in Afghanistan and Iraq.
  - War in Afghanistan (2001–2021) – In 2001, the United States, the United Kingdom, Italy, Spain, Canada, and Australia invaded Afghanistan seeking to oust the Taliban and find al-Qaeda mastermind Osama bin Laden. In 2011, the US government claimed Navy Seals had killed Bin Laden and buried his body at sea. Fatalities of coalition troops: 1,553 (2001 to 2009).
  - Iraq War (2003–2011) – In 2003, the United States, the United Kingdom, Spain, Australia, and Poland invaded and occupied Iraq. Claims that Iraq had weapons of mass destruction at its disposal were later found to be unproven. The war, which ended the rule of Saddam Hussein's Ba'ath Party, also led to violence against the coalition forces and between many Sunni and Shia Iraqi groups and al-Qaeda operations in Iraq. Casualties of the Iraq War: Approximately 110,600 between March 2003 to April 2009. Hussein was eventually sentenced to death and hanged on December 30, 2006.
- Arab–Israeli conflict (1948 – present)
  - 2006 Lebanon War (summer 2006) – took place in southern Lebanon and northern Israel. The principal parties were Hezbollah paramilitary forces and the Israeli military. The war that began as a military operation in response to the abduction of two Israeli reserve soldiers by the Hezbollah gradually strengthened and became a wider confrontation.
  - Israeli–Palestinian conflict (Early 20th century – present)
    - Second Intifada (2000–2005) – After the signing of the Oslo Accords failed to bring about a Palestinian state, in September 2000, the Second Intifada (uprising) broke out, a period of intensified Palestinian-Israeli violence, which has been taking place until the present day. As a result of the significant increase of suicide bombing attacks within Israeli population centers during the first years of the Al-Aqsa Intifada, in June 2002 Israel began the construction of the West Bank Fence along the Green Line border arguing that the barrier is necessary to protect Israeli civilians from Palestinian terrorism. The significantly reduced number of incidents of suicide bombings from 2002 to 2005 has been partly attributed to the barrier. The barrier's construction, which has been highly controversial, became a significant issue of contention between the two sides. The Second Intifada has caused thousands of victims on both sides, both among combatants and among civilians – The death toll, including both military and civilian, is estimated to be 5,500 Palestinians and over 1,000 Israelis, as well as 64 foreign citizens. Many Palestinians consider the Second Intifada to be a legitimate war of national liberation against foreign occupation, whereas many Israelis consider it to be a terrorist campaign.
    - Gaza War (2008–2009) – the frequent Hamas Qassam rocket and mortar fire launched from within civilian population centers in Gaza towards the Israeli southern civilian communities led to an Israeli military operation in Gaza, which had the stated aim of reducing the Hamas rocket attacks and stopping the arms smuggling into the Gaza Strip. Throughout the conflict, Hamas further intensified its rocket and mortar attacks against Israel, hitting civilian targets and reaching major Israeli cities Beersheba and Ashdod, for the first time. The intense urban warfare in densely populated Gaza combined with the use of massive firepower by the Israeli side and the intensified Hamas rocket attacks towards populated Israeli civilian targets led to a high toll on the Palestinian side and among civilians.
- The Second Congo War (1998–2003) – took place mainly in the Democratic Republic of the Congo. The widest interstate war in modern African history, it directly involved nine African nations, as well as about twenty armed groups. It earned the epithet of "Africa's World War" and the "Great War of Africa." An estimated 3.8 million people died, mostly from starvation and disease brought about by the deadliest conflict since World War II. Millions more were displaced from their homes or sought asylum in neighboring countries.
- Russo-Georgian War (2008) – Russia invaded Georgia in response to Georgian aggression towards civilians and attack on South Ossetia. Both Russia and Georgia were condemned internationally for their actions.
- The Second Chechen War (1999–2000) – the war was launched by the Russia on August 26, 1999, in response to the war in Dagestan and the 1999 Russian apartment bombings, which were blamed on the Chechens. During the war, Russian forces largely recaptured the separatist region of Chechnya. The campaign largely reversed the outcome of the First Chechen War, in which the region gained de facto independence as the Chechen Republic of Ichkeria.
- The Eritrean–Ethiopian War came to a close in 2000.
- Kivu conflict (2004–2009) – armed conflict between the military of the Democratic Republic of the Congo (FARDC) and the Hutu Power group Democratic Forces for the Liberation of Rwanda (FDLR).
- 2009 Boko Haram uprising – an armed conflict between Boko Haram, a militant Islamist group, and Nigerian security forces.

==== Civil wars and guerrilla wars ====
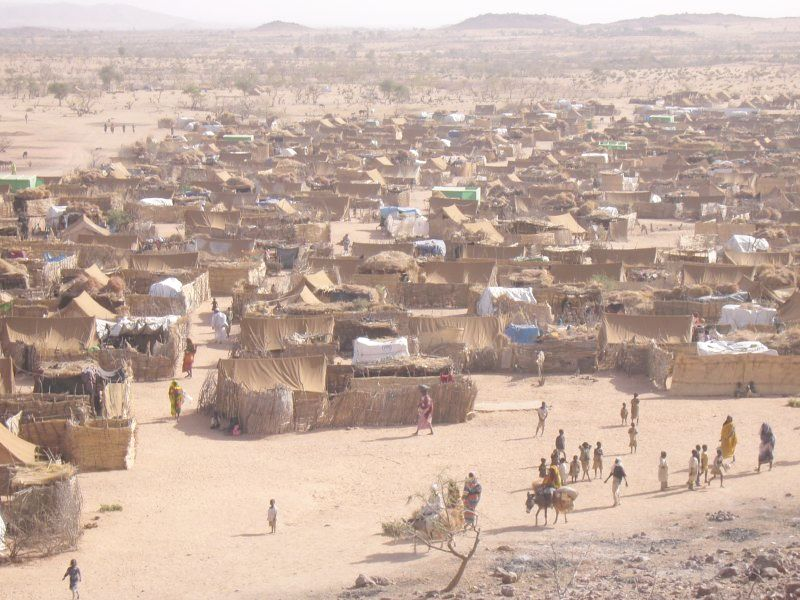
Darfur refugee camp in Chad

- War in Darfur (2003–2020) – an armed conflict in the Darfur region of western Sudan. The conflict began when the Sudan Liberation Movement/Army (SLM/A) and Justice and Equality Movement (JEM) in Darfur took up arms, accusing the government of oppressing black Africans in favor of Arabs. One side was composed mainly of the Sudanese military and the Sudanese militia group Janjaweed, recruited mostly from the Afro-Arab Abbala tribes of the northern Rizeigat region in Sudan. The other side was made up of rebel groups, notably the Sudan Liberation Movement/Army and the Justice and Equality Movement, recruited primarily from the non-Arab Muslim Fur, Zaghawa, and Masalit ethnic groups. Millions of people were displaced from their homes during the conflict. There are various estimates on the number of human casualties – Sudanese authorities claim a death toll of roughly 19,500 civilians while certain non-governmental organizations, such as the Coalition for International Justice, claim that over 400,000 people have been killed during the conflict. Former U.S. President George W. Bush called the events in Darfur a genocide during his presidency. The United States Congress unanimously passed House Concurrent Resolution 467, which declared the situation in Darfur a state-sponsored genocide by the Janjaweed. In 2008, the International Criminal Court charged Omar al-Bashir with genocide for his role in the War in Darfur.
- Mexican drug war (2006–present) – an armed conflict fought between rival drug cartels and the Mexican Armed Forces. Although Mexican drug cartels, or drug trafficking organizations, have existed for quite some time, they have become more powerful since the demise of Colombia's Cali and Medellín cartels in the 1990s. Mexican drug cartels now dominate the wholesale illicit drug market in the United States. Arrests of key cartel leaders, particularly in the Tijuana and Gulf cartels, have led to increasing drug violence as cartels fight for control of the trafficking routes into the United States. Roughly more than 16,851 people in total were killed between December 2006 until November 2009.
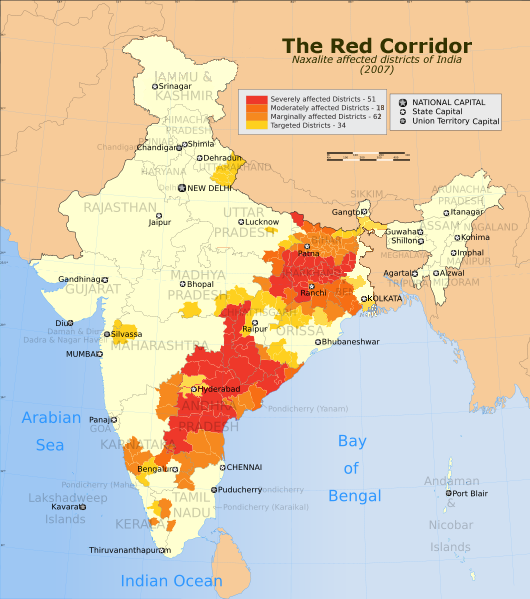
- Map showing the districts where the Naxalite movement is active (2007)
  In India, Naxalite–Maoist insurgency (1967–present) has grown alarmingly with attacks such as April 2010 Maoist attack in Dantewada, Jnaneswari Express train derailment, and Rafiganj train disaster. Naxalites are a group of far-left radical communists, supportive of Maoist political sentiment and ideology. It is presently the longest continuously active conflict worldwide. In 2006 Prime Minister Manmohan Singh called the Naxalites "The single biggest internal security challenge ever faced by our country." In 2009, he said the country was "losing the battle against Maoist rebels". According to standard definitions the Naxalite–Maoist insurgency is an ongoing conflict between Maoist groups, known as Naxalites or Naxals, and the Indian government. On April 6, 2010, Maoist rebels killed 75 security forces in a jungle ambush in central India in the worst-ever massacre of security forces by the insurgents. On the same day, Gopal, a top Maoist leader, said the attack was a "direct consequence" of the government's Operation Green Hunt offensive. This raised some voices of use of Indian Air Force against Naxalites, which were, however, declined, citing "We can't use oppressive force against our own people".
- The Colombian conflict continues causing deaths and terror in Colombia. Beginning in 1964, the FARC and ELN narcoterrorist groups were taking control of rural areas of the country by the beginning of the decade, while terrorist paramilitaries grew in other places as businesspeople and politicians thought the State would lose the war against guerrillas. However, after the failure of the peace process and the activation of Plan Colombia, Álvaro Uribe was elected president in 2002, starting a massive attack on terrorist groups, with cooperation from civil population, foreign aid and legal armed forces. The AUC paramilitary organization disbanded in 2006, while ELN guerrillas have been weakened. The Popular Liberation Army demobilized while the country's biggest terrorist group, FARC has been weakened and most of their top commanders have been killed or died during the decade. During the second half of the decade, a new criminal band has been formed by former members of AUC who did not demobilize, calling themselves "Aguilas Negras". Although the Colombian State has taken back control over most of the country, narcoterrorism still causes pain in the country. Since 2008, the Internet has become a new field of battle. Facebook has gained nationwide popularity and has become the birthplace of many civil movements against narcoterrorism such as "Colombia Soy Yo" (I am Colombia) or "Fundación Un Millón de Voces" (One Million Voices Foundation), responsible for the international protests against illegal groups during the last years.
- The Sierra Leone Civil War (1991–2002) came to an end when the Revolutionary United Front (RUF) finally laid down their arms. More than two million people were displaced from their homes because of the conflict (well over one-third of the population) many of whom became refugees in neighboring countries. Tens of thousands were killed during the conflict.
- The Sri Lankan Civil War (1983–2009) came to an end after the government defeated the Liberation Tigers of Tamil Eelam. Over 80,000 people were killed during the course of the conflict.
- Insurgency in Khyber Pakhtunkhwa (2004–present) – an armed conflict between the Pakistani Armed Forces and Islamic militants made up of local tribesmen, the Taliban, and foreign Mujahideen (Holy Warriors). It began in 2004 when tensions rooted in the Pakistani Army's search for al-Qaeda members in Pakistan's mountainous Waziristan area (in the Federally Administered Tribal Areas) escalated into armed resistance by local tribesmen. The violence has displaced 3.44 million civilians and led to more than 7,000 civilians being killed.
- The Angolan Civil War (1975–2002), once a major proxy conflict of the Cold War, the conflict ended after the anti-Communist organization UNITA disbanded to become a political party. By the time the 27-year conflict was formally brought to an end, an estimated 500,000 people had been killed.
- Shia insurgency in Yemen (2004–present) – a civil war in the Sada'a governorate of Yemen. It began after the Shia Zaidiyyah sect launched an uprising against the Yemeni government. The Yemeni government has accused Iran of directing and financing the insurgency. Thousands of rebels and civilians have been killed during the conflict.
- Somali Civil War (1991–present)
  - War in Somalia (2006–2009) – involved largely Ethiopian and Somali Transitional Federal Government (TFG) forces who fought against the Somali Islamist umbrella group, the Islamic Court Union (ICU), and other affiliated militias for control of the country. The war spawned pirates who hijacked hundreds of ships off the coast of Somalia, holding ships and crew for ransom often for months (see also Piracy in Somalia). 1.9 million people were displaced from their homes during the conflict and the number of civilian casualties during the conflict is estimated at 16,724.
  - Somali civil war (2009–present) – involved largely the forces of the Somali Somali Transitional Federal Government (TFG) assisted by African Union peacekeeping troops, whom fought against various militant Islamist factions for control of the country. The violence has displaced thousands of people residing in Mogadishu, the nation's capital. 1,739 people in total were killed between January 1, 2009, and January 1, 2010.
- Conflict in the Niger Delta (2004–present) – an ongoing conflict in the Niger Delta region of Nigeria. The conflict was caused due to the tensions between the foreign oil corporations and a number of the Niger Delta's minority ethnic groups who felt they were being exploited, particularly the Ogoni and the Ijaw. The competition for oil wealth has led to an endless violence cycle between innumerable ethnic groups, causing the militarization of nearly the entire region that was occupied by militia groups as well as Nigerian military and the forces of the Nigerian Police.
- Algerian Civil War (1991–2002) – the conflict effectively ended with a government victory, following the surrender of the Islamic Salvation Army and the 2002 defeat of the Armed Islamic Group. It is estimated that more than 100,000 people were killed during the course of the conflict.
- Civil war in Chad (1998–present)
  - Chadian Civil War (1998–2002) – involved the Movement for Justice and Democracy in Chad (MDJT) rebels that skirmished periodically with government troops in the Tibesti region, resulting in hundreds of civilian, government, and rebel casualties.
  - Chadian Civil War (2005–2010) – involved Chadian government forces and several Chadian rebel groups. The Government of Chad estimated in January 2006 that 614 Chadian citizens had been killed in cross-border raids. The fighting still continues despite several attempts to reach agreements.
- Nepalese Civil War (1996–2006) – the conflict ended with a peace agreement was reached between the government and the Maoist party in which it was set that the Maoists would take part in the new government in return for surrendering their weapons to the UN. It is estimated that more than 12,700 people were killed during the course of the conflict.
- Second Liberian Civil War (1999–2003) – The conflict began in 1999 when a rebel group Liberians United for Reconciliation and Democracy (LURD), with support from the Government of Guinea, took over northern Liberia through a coup. In early 2003, a different rebel group, the Movement for Democracy in Liberia, emerged in the south. As a result, by June–July 2003, president Charles Taylor's government controlled only a third of the country. The capital Monrovia was besieged by LURD, and that group's shelling of the city resulted in the deaths of many civilians. Thousands of people were displaced from their homes as a result of the conflict.
- Insurgency in the Maghreb (2002–present) – Algeria has been the subject of an Islamic insurgency since 2002 waged by the Sunni Islamic Jihadist militant group Salafist Group for Preaching and Combat (GSPC). GSPC allied itself with the Al-Qaeda Organization in the Islamic Maghreb against the Algerian government. The conflict has since spread to other neighboring countries.
- Ituri conflict (1999–2007) – a conflict fought between the Lendu and Hema ethnic groups in the Ituri region of northeastern Democratic Republic of Congo (DRC). While there have been many phases to the conflict, the most recent armed clashes ran from 1999 to 2003, with a low-level conflict continuing until 2007. More than 50,000 people have been killed in the conflict and hundreds of thousands forced from their homes.
- Central African Republic Bush War (2004–2007) – began with the rebellion by the Union of Democratic Forces for Unity (UFDR) rebels, after the current president of the Central African Republic, François Bozizé, seized power in a 2003 coup. The violence has displaced around 10,000 civilians and has led to hundreds of civilians being killed.
- Afghan Civil War (1996–2001) – an armed conflict that continued after the capture of Kabul by the Taliban, in which the formation of the Afghan Northern Alliance attempted to oust the Taliban. It proved largely unsuccessful, as the Taliban continued to make gains and eliminated much of the Alliance's leadership.

=== Coups ===
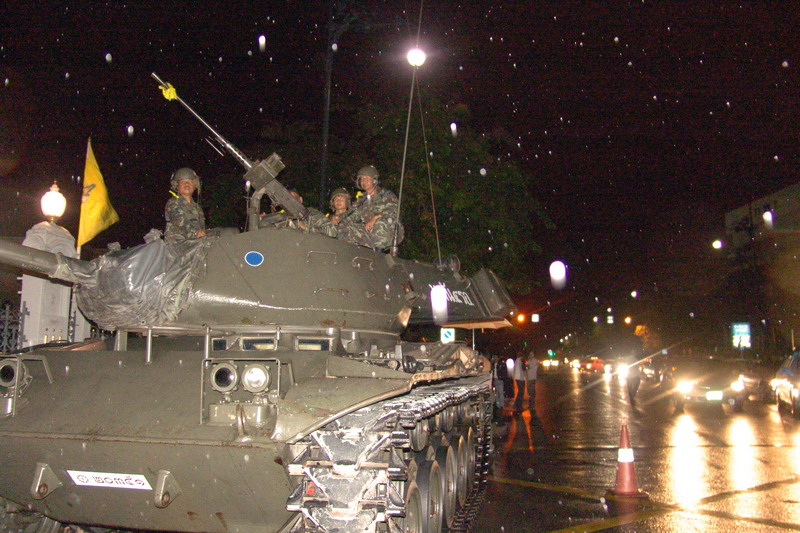
2006 Thai coup d'état

The most prominent coups d'état of the decade include:

- 2000 overthrow of Slobodan Milošević in the Federal Republic of Yugoslavia – after Slobodan Milošević was accused by opposition figures of winning the 2000 election through electoral fraud, mass protests led by the opposition movement Otpor! pressure Slobodan Milošević to resign. Milošević was later arrested in 2001 and sent to the Hague to face war crimes charges for his alleged involvement in war crimes of the Yugoslav Wars.
- 2002 Venezuelan coup attempt – a failed military coup d'état on April 11, 2002, which aimed to overthrow the president of Venezuela Hugo Chávez. During the coup Hugo Chávez was arrested and Pedro Carmona became the interim president for 47 hours. The coup led to a pro-Chávez uprising that the Metropolitan Police attempted to suppress. The pro-Chávez Presidential Guard eventually retook the Miraflores presidential palace without firing a shot, leading to the collapse of the Carmona government.
- 2004 Haitian coup d'état – a conflict fought for several weeks in Haiti during February 2004 that resulted in the premature end of President Jean-Bertrand Aristide's second term, and the installment of an interim government led by Gérard Latortue.
- 2006 Thai coup d'état – on September 19, 2006, while the elected Thai prime minister Thaksin Shinawatra was in New York for a meeting of the UN, Army Commander-in-Chief Lieutenant General Sonthi Boonyaratglin launched a bloodless coup d'état.
- Fatah–Hamas conflict (2006–present) – an armed conflict fought between the two main Palestinian factions, Fatah and Hamas with each vying to assume political control of the Palestinian territories. In June 2007, Hamas took control of the entire Gaza Strip, and established a separate government while Fatah remained in control of the West Bank. This in practice divided the Palestinian Authority into two. Various forces affiliated with Fatah engaged in combat with Hamas, in numerous gun battles. Most Fatah leaders eventually escaped to Egypt and the West Bank, while some were captured and killed.
- 2009 Honduran coup d'état – The armed forces of the country entered the president's residence and overthrew president Manuel Zelaya. (see 2009 Honduran constitutional crisis).

=== Nuclear threats ===
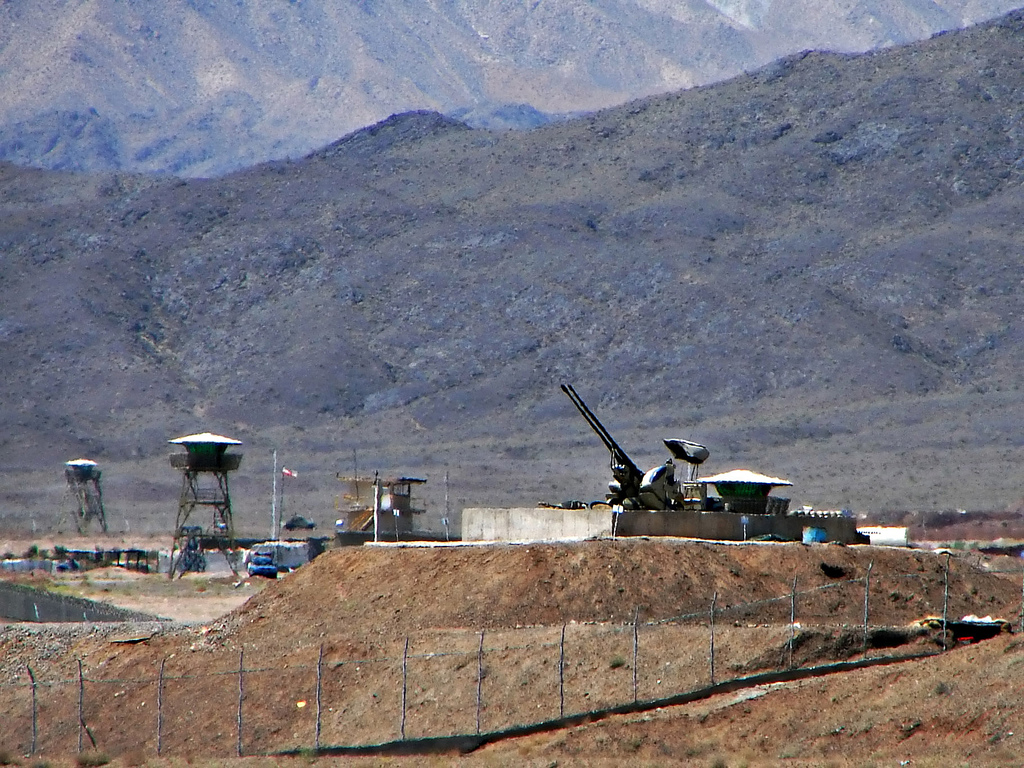
Anti-aircraft guns guarding Natanz Nuclear Facility in Iran

- Since 2005, Iran's nuclear program has become the subject of contention with the Western world due to suspicions that Iran could divert the civilian nuclear technology to a weapons program. This has led the UN Security Council to impose sanctions against Iran on select companies linked to this program, thus furthering its economic isolation on the international scene. The U.S. Director of National Intelligence said in February 2009 that Iran would not realistically be able to a get a nuclear weapon until 2013, if it chose to develop one.
- In 2003, the United States invaded Iraq over allegations that its leader Saddam Hussein was stockpiling weapons of mass destruction including chemical and biological weapons or was in the process of creating them. None were found, spawning multiple theories.
- North Korea successfully performed two nuclear tests in 2006 and 2009.
- Operation Orchard – during the operation, Israel bombed what was believed to be a Syrian nuclear reactor on September 6, 2007, which was thought to be built with the aid of North Korea. The White House and Central Intelligence Agency (CIA) later declared that American intelligence indicated the site was a nuclear facility with a military purpose, though Syria denies this.
- The Doomsday Clock, the symbolic representation of the threat of nuclear annihilation, moved four minutes closer to midnight: two minutes in 2002 and two minutes in 2007 to 5 minutes to midnight.

=== Decolonization and independence ===
- East Timor regains independence from Indonesia in 2002. Portugal granted independence to East Timor in 1975, but it was soon after invaded by Indonesia, which only recognized East Timorese independence in 2002.
- Montenegro gains independence from Serbia in 2006, ending the 88-year-old Yugoslavia.
- Kosovo declares independence from Serbia in 2008, though its independence still remains unrecognized by many countries.
- On August 23, 2005, Israel's unilateral disengagement from 25 Jewish settlements in the Gaza Strip and West Bank ends.
- On August 26, 2008, Russia formally recognises the disputed Georgian regions of Abkhazia and South Ossetia as independent states. The vast majority of United Nations member states maintain that the areas belong to Georgia.

=== Political trends ===
==== American party system ====
During the 2000s, the expectations and unspoken rules for acceptable conduct among American politicians affiliated with the Republican or Democratic Parties changed due to the decline of political bosses in the previous 4 decades and the momentous events in America that happened during the decade.

Generally, American presidential candidates abided by and respected the established procedures of both major parties' presidential nomination process.

==== Peaceful transfers of power ====
During this decade, the peaceful transfer of power through elections first occurred in Mexico, Indonesia, Taiwan, and several other countries. (See below.)

=== Deaths ===
Prominent deaths of sitting leaders include:

- June 10, 2000: Hafez al-Assad, President of Syria (1971–2000).
- January 16, 2001: Laurent-Desire Kabila, President of Republic of Congo (1997–2001) was assassinated.
- March 11, 2003: Zoran Djindjic, Prime Minister of Serbia and Montenegro (2001–03) was assassinated.
- February 26, 2004: Boris Trajkovski, President of Macedonia (1999–2004) was killed plane crash.
- July 6, 2004: Thomas Klestil, President of Austria (1992–2004)
- November 2, 2004: Zayed bin Sultan Al Nahyan, President of the United Arab Emirates (1971–2004).
- November 11, 2004:, Yasser Arafat, President of Palestine (1994–2004).
- February 3, 2005: Zurab Zhvania, Prime Minister of Georgia (2004–2005).
- February 5, 2005: Gnassingbé Eyadéma, President of Togo (1967–2005).
- April 2, 2005: Pope John Paul II, Pope (1978–2005).
- April 6, 2005: Rainier III, Prince of Monaco (1949–2005).
- August 1, 2005, Fahd, King of the Saudi Arabia (1982–2005).
- January 15, 2006: Jaber Al-Ahmad Al-Sabah, Emir of Kuwait (1977–2006).
- January 21, 2006: Ibrahim Rugova, President of Kosovo (2002–2005).
- December 21, 2006 Saparmurat Niyazov, President of Turkmenistan (1991–2006).
- August 19, 2008: Levy Mwanawasa, President of Zambia (2002–2008).
- December 22, 2008: Lansana Conté, President of Guinea (1984–2008).
- March 2, 2009: João Bernardo Vieira, President of Guinea-Bissau (2005–2009) was assassinated.
- June 8, 2009: Omar Bongo, President of Gabon (1967–2009).

Prominent deaths of former leaders include:

- January 4, 2000: Spyridon Markezinis, Prime Minister of Greece (1973).
- January 19, 2000: Bettino Craxi, Prime Minister of Italy (1983–87), died while was in exile.
- September 28, 2000: Pierre Trudeau, Prime Minister of Canada (1968–79, 1980–84).
- October 10, 2000: Sirimavo Bandaranaike, Prime Minister of Sri Lanka (1960–1965, 1970–1977, 1994–2000) and the First female head of government in history.
- November 9, 2001: Giovanni Leone, Prime Minister of Italy (1963, 1968), President of Italy (1971–78)
- March 12, 2002: Spyros Kyprianou, President of Cyprus (1977–1988)
- June 24, 2002: Pierre Werner, Prime Minister of Luxembourg, (1959–1974, 1979–1984)
- June 5, 2004: Ronald Reagan, 40th president of the United States (1981–89)
- July 10, 2004: Maria de Lourdes Pintasilgo, Prime Minister of Portugal (1979–1980)
- 23 December, 2004: P.V. Narasimha Rao, Prime Minister of India (1991–1996)
- February 14, 2005: Rafik Hariri, Prime Minister of Lebanon (1992–98, 2000–04), was assassinated.
- March 26 & July 17, 2005: James Callaghan and Edward Heath, Prime Ministers of the United Kingdom (1976–79 and 1970–74 respectively).
- September 13, 2005: Julio César Turbay Ayala, President of Colombia (1978-1982)
- March 11, 2006: Slobodan Milosevic, the last leader of Yugoslavia, died on the Prison
- March 14, 2006: Lennart Meri, President of Estonia (1992–2001)
- March 15, 2006: Georgios Rallis, Prime Minister of Greece (1980–81)
- December 10, 2006: Augusto Pinochet, Dictator of Chile (1973–90)
- December 26, 2006: Gerald Ford, 38th president of the United States (1974–77)
- December 30, 2006: Saddam Hussein, Dictator of Iraq (1979–2003) was executed
- April 23, 2007: Boris Yeltsin, President of Russia (1991–99)
- June 14, 2007: Kurt Waldheim, President of Austria (1986–92)
- July 11, 2007: Alfonso López Michelsen, President of Colombia (1974–78)
- August 25, 2007: Raymond Barre, Prime Minister of France (1976–1981)
- December 27, 2007: Benazir Bhutto, Prime Minister of Pakistan (1988–90, 1993–96), was assassinated.
- January 27, 2008: Suharto, President of Indonesia (1967–98)
- April 12, 2008: Patrick Hillery, President of the Republic of Ireland (1976–90)
- May 3, 2008: Leopoldo Calvo Sotelo, Prime Minister of Spain (1981–82)
- December 12, 2008: Tassos Papadopoulos, President of Cyprus (2003–08)
- March 31, 2009: Raul Alfonsin, President of Argentina (1983–89)
- May 23, 2009: Ro Moo-hyun, President of South Korea (2003, 2004–08)
- August 1, 2009: Corazon Aquino, President of Philippines (1986–92)
- August 18, 2009: Kim Dae Jung, President of South Korea (1998–2003)
- December 30, 2009: Abdurrahman Wahid, President of Indonesia (1999-2001)

=== Prominent political events ===
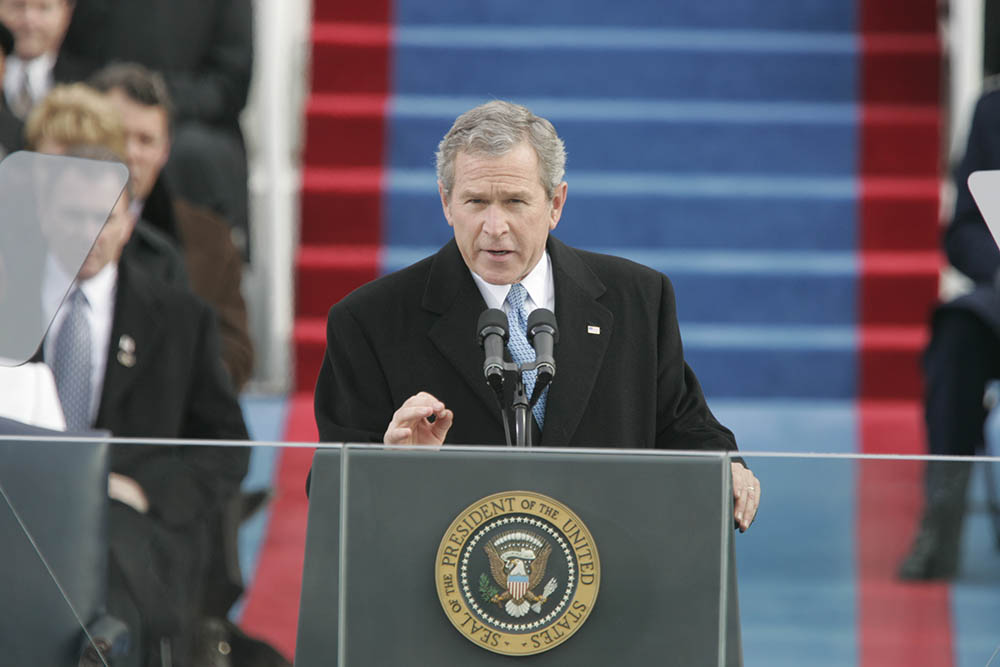
George W. Bush, the 43rd president of the United States, 2001–2009

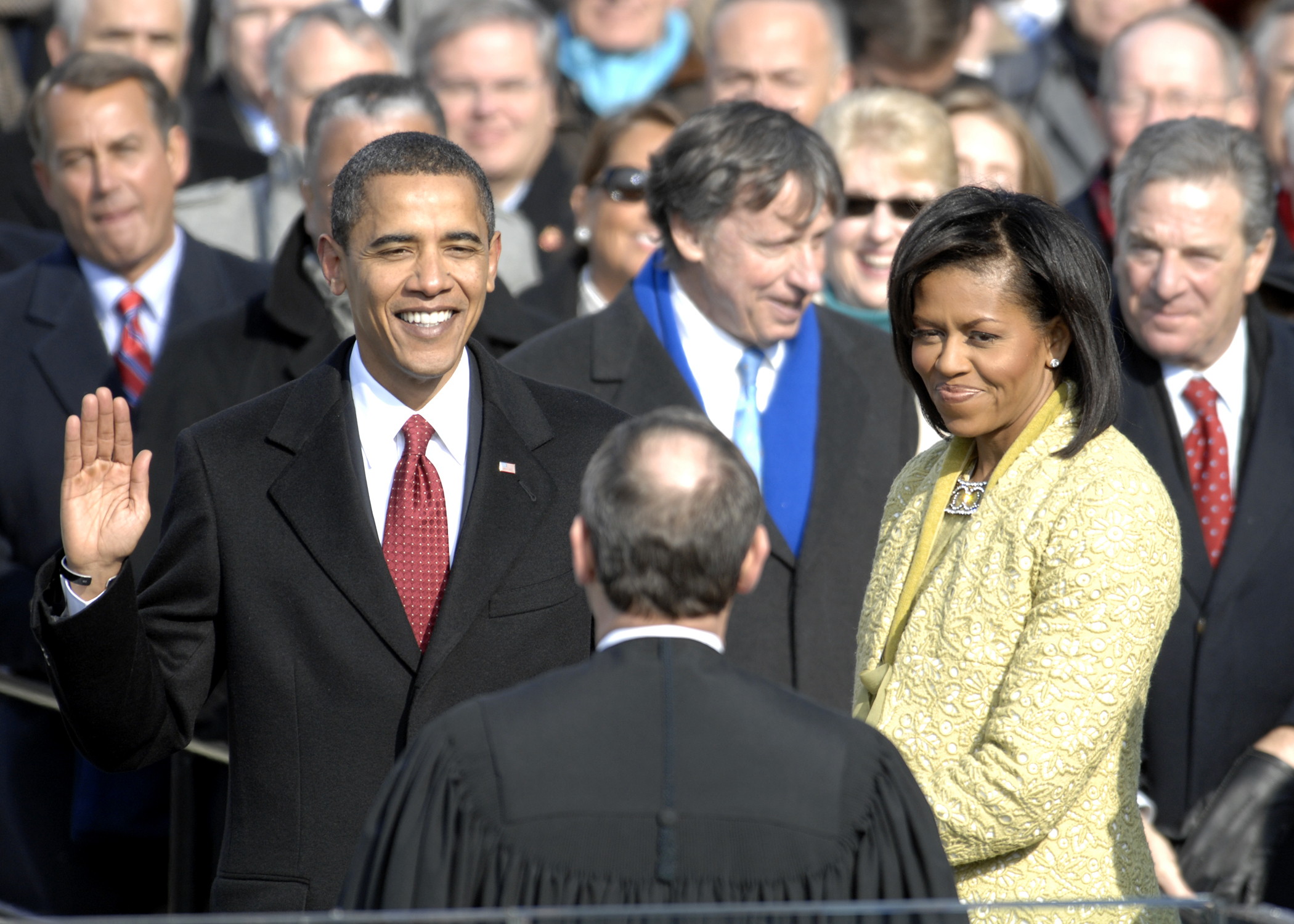
Barack Obama, the first African American president of the United States, was inaugurated in 2009

The prominent political events of the decade include:

==== North America ====
===== Canada =====
- Paul Martin replaces Jean Chrétien as Prime Minister of Canada in 2003 July 23 by becoming the new leader of the Liberal Party. Stephen Harper was elected prime minister in 2006 following the defeat of Paul Martin's government in a motion of no confidence.

===== Greenland =====
- Greenland was granted further Self-governance (or "self-rule") within the Kingdom of Denmark on June 21, 2009.

===== Mexico =====
- Vicente Fox was elected President of Mexico in the 2000 presidential election, making him the first president elected from an opposition party in 71 years, defeating the then-dominant Institutional Revolutionary Party (PRI).

===== United States =====
- George W. Bush was sworn in succeeding Bill Clinton as the 43rd president of the United States on January 20, 2001, following a sharply contested election.
- On October 26, 2001, U.S. president George W. Bush signed the USA PATRIOT Act into law.
- On February 15, 2003, anti-war protests broke out around the world in opposition to the U.S. Invasion of Iraq, in what the Guinness Book of World Records called the largest anti-war rally in human history. In reaction, The New York Times writer Patrick Tyler wrote in a February 17 article that: ...the huge anti-war demonstrations around the world this weekend are reminders that there may still be two superpowers on the planet: the United States and world public opinion.
- On June 5, 2004, Ronald Reagan, the 40th president of the United States, died after having suffered from Alzheimer's disease for nearly a decade. His seven-day state funeral followed, spanning June 5–11. The general public stood in long lines waiting for a turn to view the casket. People passed by the casket at a rate of about 5,000 per hour (83.3 per minute, or 1.4 per second) and the wait time was about three hours. In all, 104,684 passed through when Reagan lay in state.
- Barack Obama was sworn in as the 44th president of the United States in 2009, becoming the nation's first African American president.

==== South America ====
- November 19, 2000 – Peruvian dictator/president Alberto Fujimori resigns via fax. Valentín Paniagua is named temporary president.
- Álvaro Uribe is elected President of Colombia in 2002, the first political independent to do so in more than a century and a half, creating the right-wing political movement known as uribism. Uribe was re-elected in 2006.
- In 2006, Michelle Bachelet is elected as the first female president of Chile.
- Pink tide: Left-wing governments emerge in South American countries. These governments include those of Hugo Chávez in Venezuela since 1999, Fernando Lugo in Paraguay, Rafael Correa in Ecuador, and Evo Morales in Bolivia. With the creation of the ALBA, Fidel Castro—leader of Cuba between 1959 and 2008—and Hugo Chávez reaffirmed their opposition to the aggressive militarism and imperialism of the United States.
- Luiz Inácio Lula da Silva was elected (2002) and reelected (2006) President of Brazil.
- In 2003, Néstor Kirchner was elected as President of Argentina. And in 2007, he was later succeeded by his wife, Cristina Fernández de Kirchner, who became the first directly elected female president of Argentina.
- May 23, 2008 – The Union of South American Nations, a supranational union, is made from joining the Andean Community and Mercosur.

==== Asia ====
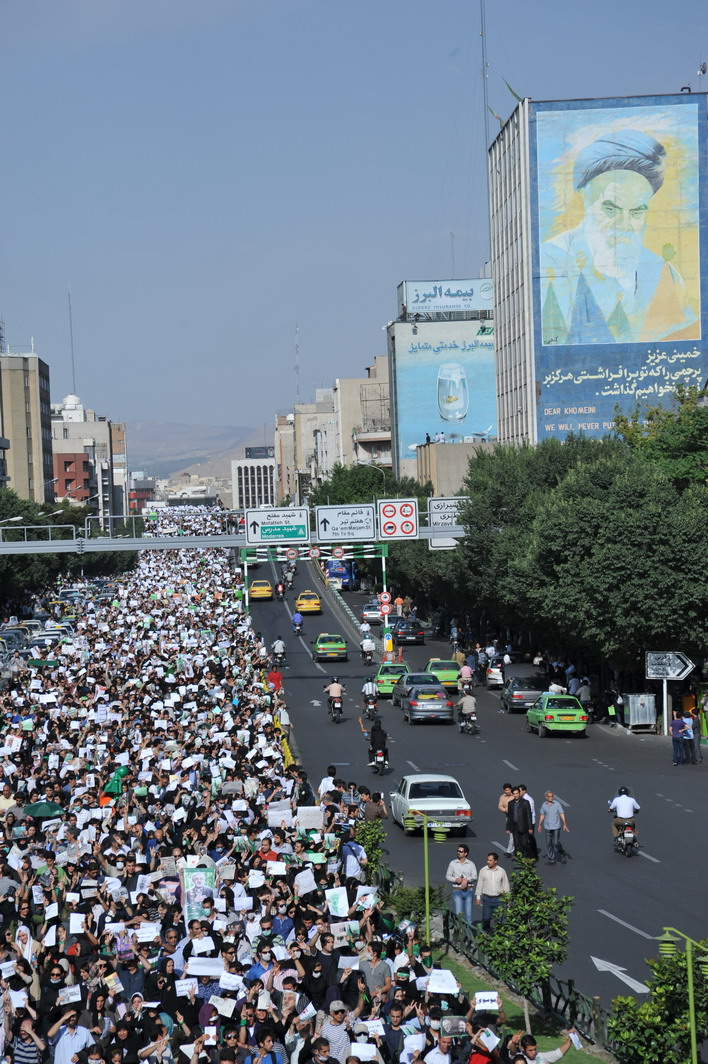
Protesters in Tehran during the 2009 Iranian election protests

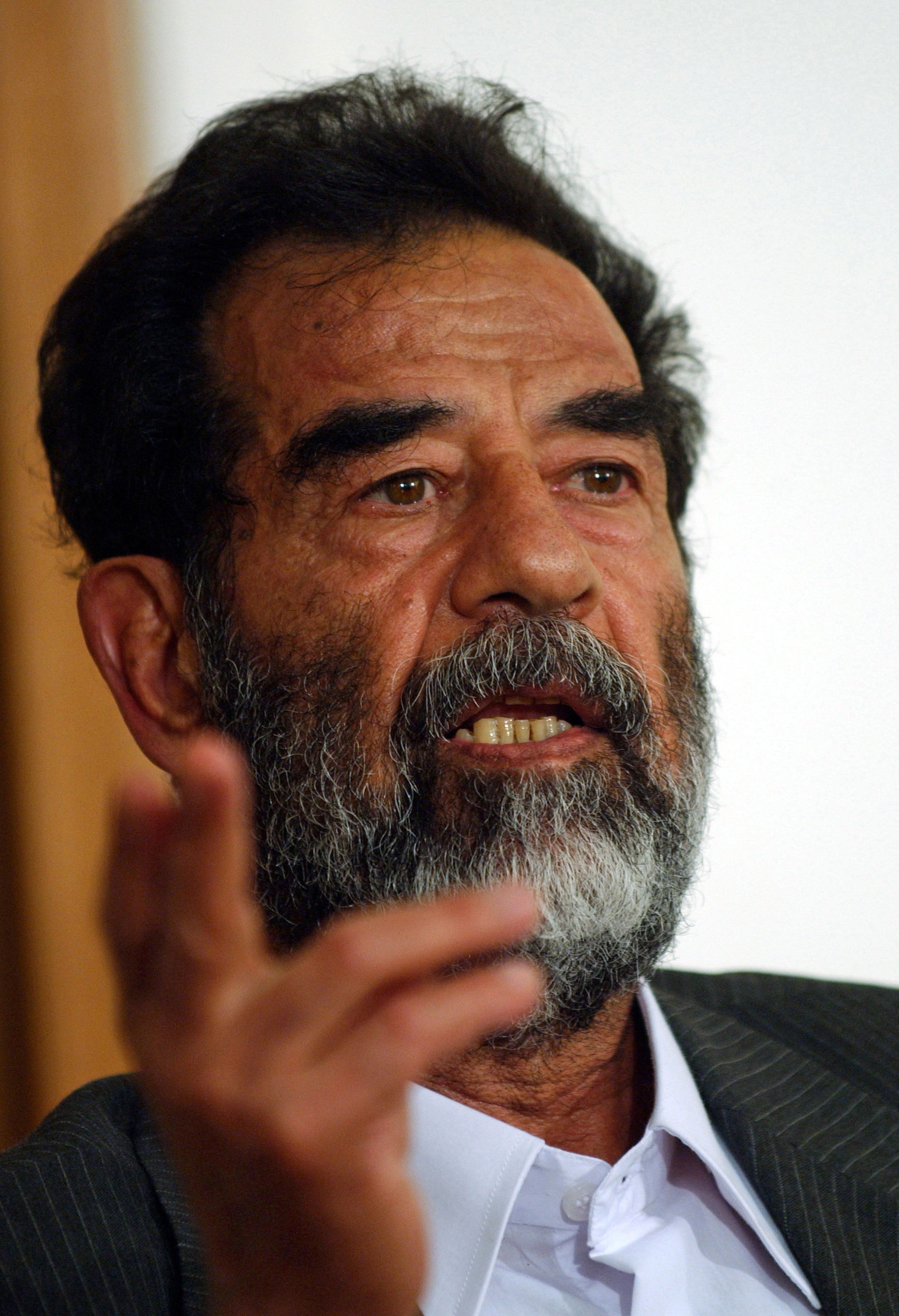
Saddam Hussein

- On May 18, 2000, Chen Shui-bian was elected as the president of Taiwan, ending the half-century rule of the KMT on the island, and became the first president of the DPP.
- Israeli withdrawal from the Israeli security zone in southern Lebanon – on May 25, 2000, Israel withdrew IDF forces from the Israeli occupation of southern Lebanon in southern Lebanon after 22 years.
- In July 2000 the Camp David 2000 Summit was held which was aimed at reaching a "final status" agreement between the Palestinians and the Israelis. The summit collapsed after Yasser Arafat would not accept a proposal drafted by American and Israeli negotiators. Barak was prepared to offer the entire Gaza Strip, a Palestinian capital in a part of East Jerusalem, 73% of the West Bank (excluding eastern Jerusalem) raising to 90–94% after 10–25 years, and financial reparations for Palestinian refugees for peace. Arafat turned down the offer without making a counter-offer.
- January 20, 2001 – June 30, 2010 – Joseph Estrada resigns as 13th president of the Philippines amid an ongoing impeachment trial and protests; Gloria Macapagal Arroyo takes office as the 14th president of the Philippines.
- 2002 – Recep Tayyip Erdoğan was elected as Prime Minister of Turkey. Abdullah Gül was elected as President of Turkey.
- March 15–16, 2003 – CPC general secretary, President Hu Jintao and Premier Wen Jiabao, replaced former People's Republic of China leaders Jiang Zemin and Zhu Rongji.
- 2003 – the 12-year self-government in Iraqi Kurdistan ends, developed under the protection of the UN "No-fly zone" during the now-ousted Saddam Hussein regime.
- 2003 – Prime minister of Malaysia Mahathir Mohamad resigns in October, he was succeeded by Abdullah bin Ahmad Badawi.
- Manmohan Singh was elected (2004) and reelected (2009) Prime Minister in India. He is the only Prime Minister since Jawaharlal Nehru to return to power after completing a full five-year term. Singh previously carried out economic reforms in India in 1991, during his tenure as the Finance Minister.
- January 9, 2005 – Mahmoud Abbas is elected to succeed Yasser Arafat as Palestinian Authority President.
- August 1, 2005 – Fahd, the king of Saudi Arabia from 1982 to 2005, died and is replaced by King Abdullah.
- January 4, 2006 – Powers are transferred from Israeli prime minister Ariel Sharon to his deputy, Vice Prime Minister Ehud Olmert, after Sharon suffers a massive hemorrhagic stroke.
- January 25, 2006 – Hamas wins the 2006 Palestinian legislative election.
- December 30, 2006 – Former leader of Iraq Saddam Hussein is executed.
- 2007 – The king of Nepal is suspended from exercising his duties by the newly formed interim legislature on January 15, 2007.
- 2007 political crisis in Pakistan, Pervez Musharraf resigns as Chief of Army Staff after the assassination of Benazir Bhutto.
- 2008 – Nepal becomes the youngest democracy of the world by transforming from a constitutional monarchy to a socialist republic on May 28, 2008.
- 2008–10 Thai political crisis and 2010 Thai political protests by "red shirts" demonstrations.
- 2009 Iranian election protests – The 2009 Iranian presidential election sparked massive protests in Iran and around the world against alleged electoral fraud and in support of defeated candidate Mir-Hossein Mousavi. During the protests the Iranian authorities closed universities in Tehran, blocked web sites, blocked cell phone transmissions and text messaging, and banned rallies. Several demonstrators in Iran were killed or imprisoned during the protests. Dozens of human casualties were reported or confirmed.
- Death and funeral of Corazon Aquino – Former president Corazon Aquino of the Philippines died of cardiorespiratory arrest on August 1, 2009, at the age of 76 after being in hospital from June 2009, and being diagnosed with colorectal cancer in March 2008.

==== Europe ====
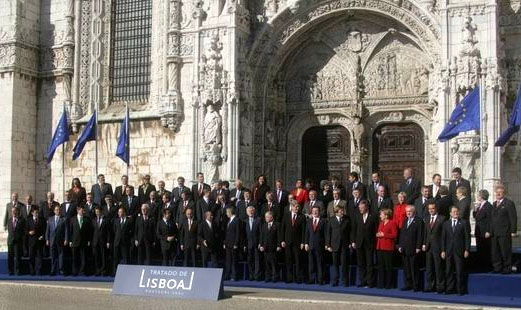
Treaty of Lisbon

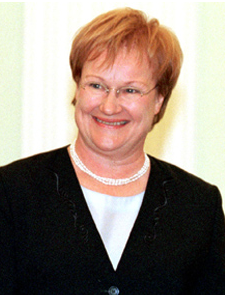
Tarja Halonen served as Finland's 11th President and the first female head of state from 2000 to 2012.

- The mayor of London is an elected politician who, along with the London Assembly of 25 members, is accountable for the strategic government of Greater London. The role, created in 2000 after the London devolution referendum, was the first directly elected mayor in the United Kingdom.
- The Netherlands becomes the first country in the world to fully legalize same-sex marriage on April 1, 2001.
- Silvio Berlusconi becomes Prime Minister of Italy in 2001 and again in 2008, after two years of a government held by Romano Prodi, dominating the political scene for more than a decade and becoming the longest-serving post-war prime minister.
- European integration makes progress with the definitive circulation of the euro in twelve countries in 2002 and the widening of European Union to 27 countries in 2007. A European Constitution bill is rejected by French and Dutch voters in 2005, but a similar text, the Treaty of Lisbon, is drafted in 2007 and finally adopted by the 27 members countries.
- June 1–4, 2002 – The Golden Jubilee of Queen Elizabeth II was the international celebration marking the 50th anniversary of the accession of Elizabeth II to the thrones of seven countries.
- Color revolutions: The Rose Revolution in Georgia leads to the ousting of Eduard Shevardnadze and the end of the Soviet era of leadership in the country.
- José Luis Rodríguez Zapatero replaced José María Aznar as President of the Government of Spain in 2004.
- Color revolutions: The Orange Revolution in Ukraine occurs in the aftermath of the 2004 Ukrainian presidential election.
- Pope John Paul II dies on April 2, 2005. Pope Benedict XVI is elected on April 19, 2005.
- Angela Merkel becomes the first female chancellor of Germany in 2005.
- The St Andrews Agreement signed in St Andrews, Fife, Scotland to restore the Northern Ireland Assembly and bring in the principle of policing by consent with the Police Service of Northern Ireland with all parties in 2006.
- Nicolas Sarkozy is elected President of France in 2007. succeeding Jacques Chirac, who had held the position for 12 years.
- Gordon Brown succeeds Tony Blair as Prime Minister of the United Kingdom in 2007.
- Tony Blair was officially confirmed as Middle East envoy for the United Nations, European Union, United States, and Russia in 2007.
- Dmitry Medvedev succeeded Vladimir Putin as the president of Russia in 2008.
- Parties broadly characterised by political scientists as being right-wing populist soar throughout the 2000s, in the wake of increasing anti-Islam and anti-immigration sentiment in most Western European countries. By 2010, such parties (albeit often significant differences between them) were present in the national parliaments of Belgium, the Netherlands, Denmark, Norway, Sweden, Finland, Switzerland, Austria, Italy and Greece. In Austria, Italy and Switzerland, the Freedom Party of Austria, Lega Nord and Swiss People's Party, respectively, were at times also part of the national governments, and in Denmark, the Danish People's Party tolerated a right-liberal minority government from 2001 throughout the decade. While not being present in the national parliaments of France and the United Kingdom, Jean-Marie Le Pen of the National Front came second in the first round of the 2002 French presidential elections, and in the 2009 European Parliament election, the UK Independence Party came second, beating even the Labour Party, while the British National Party managed to win two seats for the first time.

== Assassinations and attempts ==
Prominent assassinations, targeted killings, and assassination attempts include:

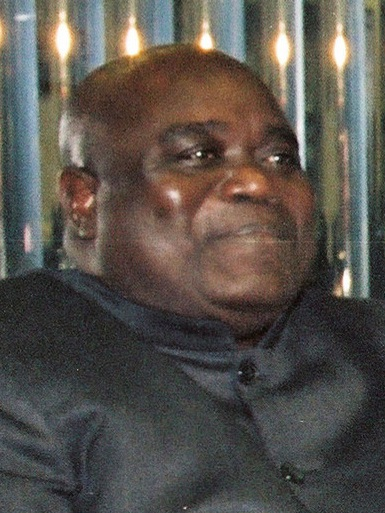
Laurent-Désiré Kabila

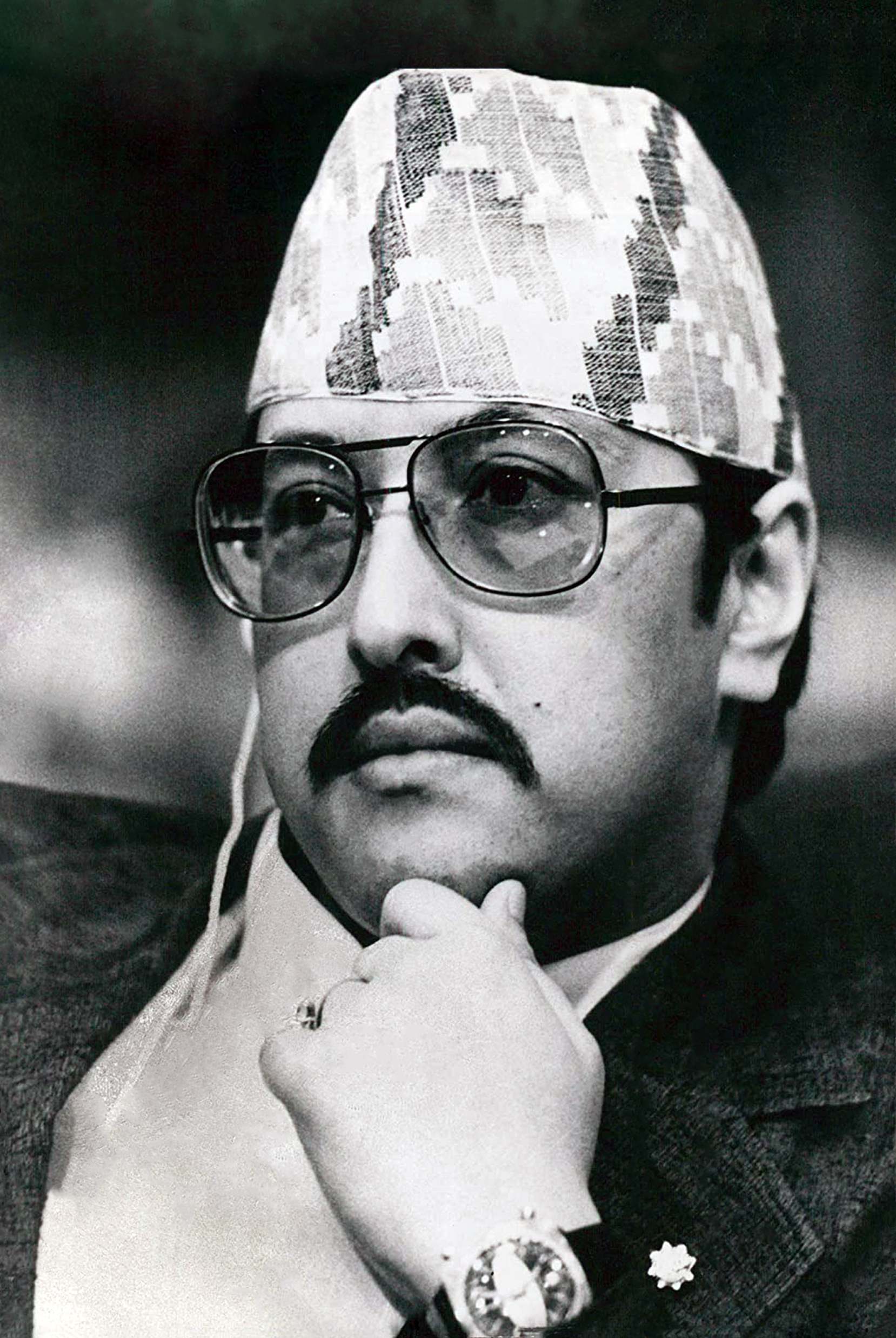
Birendra of Nepal

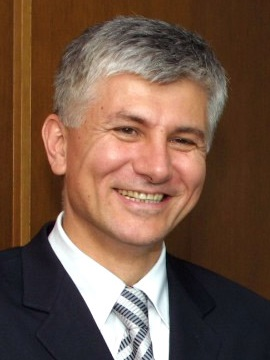
Zoran Djindjic

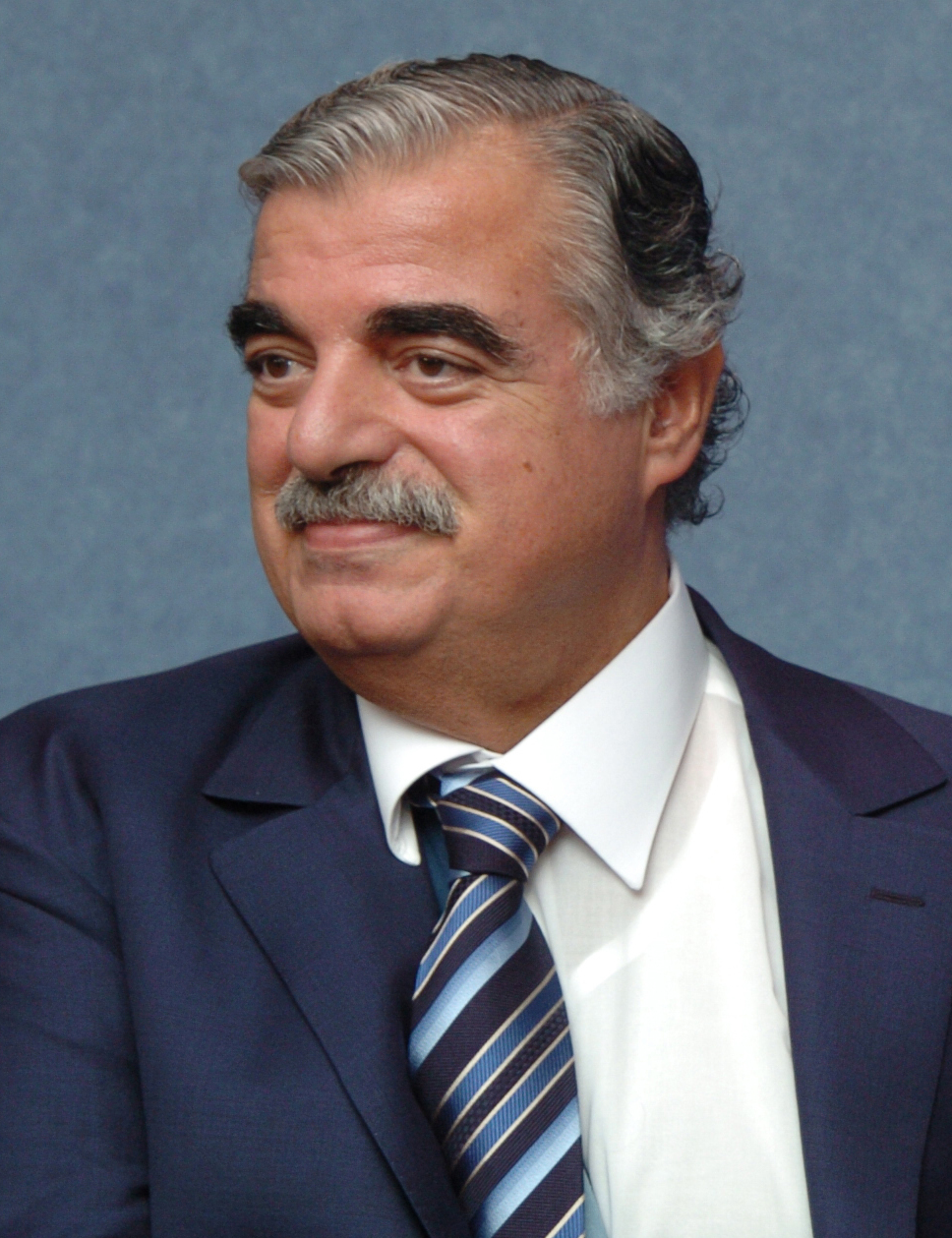
Rafic Hariri

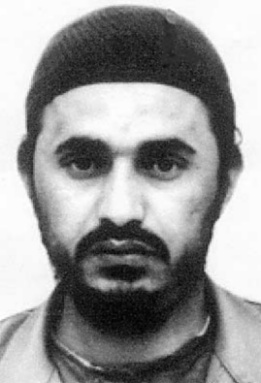
Abu Musab al-Zarqawi

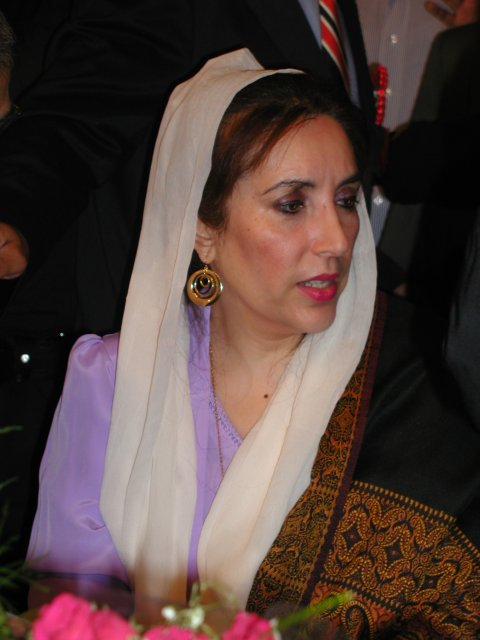
Benazir Bhutto

Date	Description
January 16, 2001	Laurent-Désiré Kabila, the president of the Democratic Republic of the Congo was assassinated by a bodyguard. The motive remains unexplained.
June 1, 2001	King Birendra of Nepal, along with eight other royals, are killed by Nepal's crown prince Diprendra who then shoots himself. Nepal's laws regarding succession allows the comatose Dipendra to rule for three days before he succumbs to his injuries.
September 9, 2001	Ahmad Shah Massoud, guerilla commander of the Northern Alliance against the Soviet invasion and against the Taliban regime, was killed in Khwaja Bahauddin, Takhar Province, Afghanistan by Al-Qaeda operatives, days before the September 11 attacks.
October 17, 2001	Israeli Minister of Tourism Rehavam Ze'evi was assassinated by three Palestinian assailants, members of the Popular Front for the Liberation of Palestine.
May 6, 2002	Pim Fortuyn, Dutch politician, was assassinated by environmentalist activist Volkert van der Graaf.
March 12, 2003	Zoran Đinđić, Serbian and Montenegrin Prime Minister, is assassinated by Zvezdan Jovanović, a soldier of Milorad Ulemek, the former commander of the Special Operations Unit of Yugoslavia's secret police.
September 10, 2003	Anna Lindh, Swedish foreign minister, was assassinated after being stabbed in the chest, stomach, and arms by Serbian and Montenegrin national Mijailo Mijailović while shopping in a Stockholm department store.
March 22, 2004	Ahmed Yassin, the founder and spiritual leader of the militant Islamist group Hamas, was assassinated in the Gaza Strip by the Israeli Air Force.
November 2, 2004	Theo van Gogh, Dutch filmmaker and critic of Islamic culture, was assassinated in Amsterdam by Mohammed Bouyeri.
February 14, 2005	Rafic Hariri, former prime minister of Lebanon, was assassinated when explosives equivalent to around 1,000 kg of TNT were detonated as his motorcade drove past the St. George Hotel in Beirut. The assassination attempt also killed at least 16 other people and injured 120 others.
June 7, 2006	Abu Musab al-Zarqawi, Jordanian-born Jihadist, was killed in a targeted killing in an isolated safe house in the north of Baqubah, Iraq, by two U.S. Air Force F-16C jets, 5 others were reportedly killed.
December 27, 2007	Benazir Bhutto, former Pakistani prime minister, was assassinated at an election rally in Rawalpindi by a bomb blast. The assassination attempt also killed at least 80 other people.
March 2, 2009	João Bernardo Vieira, President of Guinea-Bissau, was assassinated during an armed attack on his residence in Bissau.
April 30, 2009	Seven people are killed when a vehicle rams through a crowd watching the Koninginnedag parade in Apeldoorn in an attempt to target Queen Beatrix of the Netherlands, Crown Prince Willem-Alexander and other members of the Dutch royal family. The assailant dies a day later due to injuries sustained in the attack.

== Disasters ==
=== Natural disasters ===
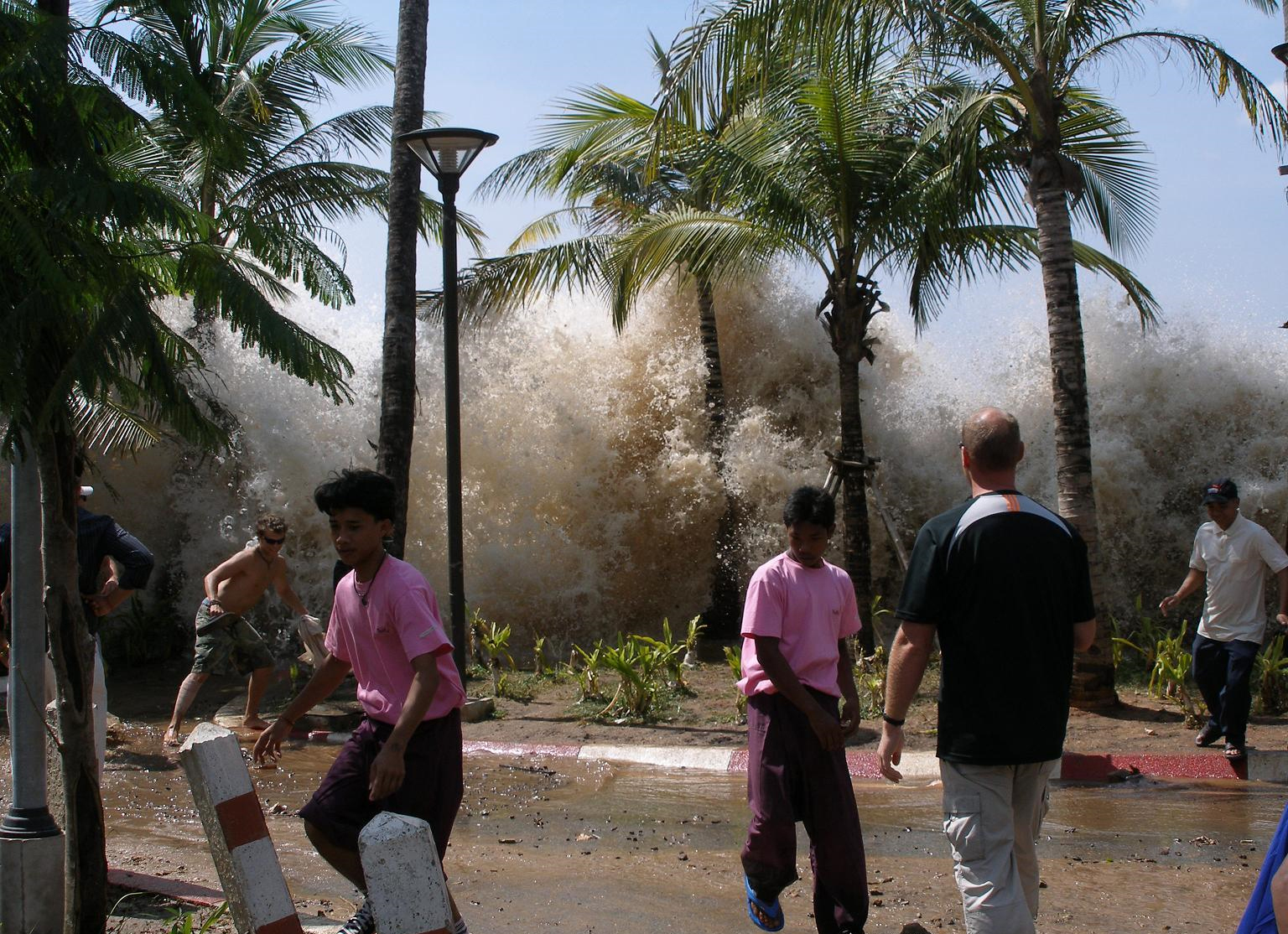
2004 Indian Ocean earthquake. The tsunami caused by the December 26, 2004, earthquake strikes Ao Nang, Thailand.

The 2000s experienced some of the worst and most destructive natural disasters in history.

==== Earthquakes (including tsunamis) ====
- On January 13, 2001, a 7.6-magnitude earthquake strikes El Salvador, killing 944 people and injuring 5,565 people.
- On January 26, 2001, an earthquake hits Gujarat, India, killing more than 12,000.
- On February 28, 2001, the Nisqually earthquake hits the Seattle metro area. It caused major damage to the old highway standing in the urban center of Seattle.
- On February 13, 2001, a 6.6-magnitude earthquake hits El Salvador, killing at least 400.
- On May 21, 2003, an earthquake in the Boumerdès region of northern Algeria kills 2,200.
- On December 26, 2003, the massive 2003 Bam earthquake devastates southeastern Iran; over 40,000 people are reported killed in the city of Bam.
- On December 26, 2004, one of the worst natural disasters in recorded history hits southeast Asia, when the largest earthquake in 40 years hits the entire Indian Ocean region. The massive 9.3 magnitude earthquake, epicentered just off the west coast of the Indonesian island of Sumatra, generates enormous tsunami waves that crash into the coastal areas of a number of nations including Thailand, India, Sri Lanka, the Maldives, Malaysia, Myanmar, Bangladesh, and Indonesia. The official death toll from the Boxing Day tsunami in the affected countries with over 230,000 people dead.
- On October 8, 2005, the 2005 Kashmir earthquake killed over 80,000 people.
- On May 12, 2008, over 69,000 are killed in central south-west China by the Wenchuan quake, an earthquake measuring 7.9 on the moment magnitude scale. The epicenter was 90 kilometers (56 mi) west-northwest of the provincial capital Chengdu, Sichuan province.

==== Tropical cyclones, other weather, and bushfires ====
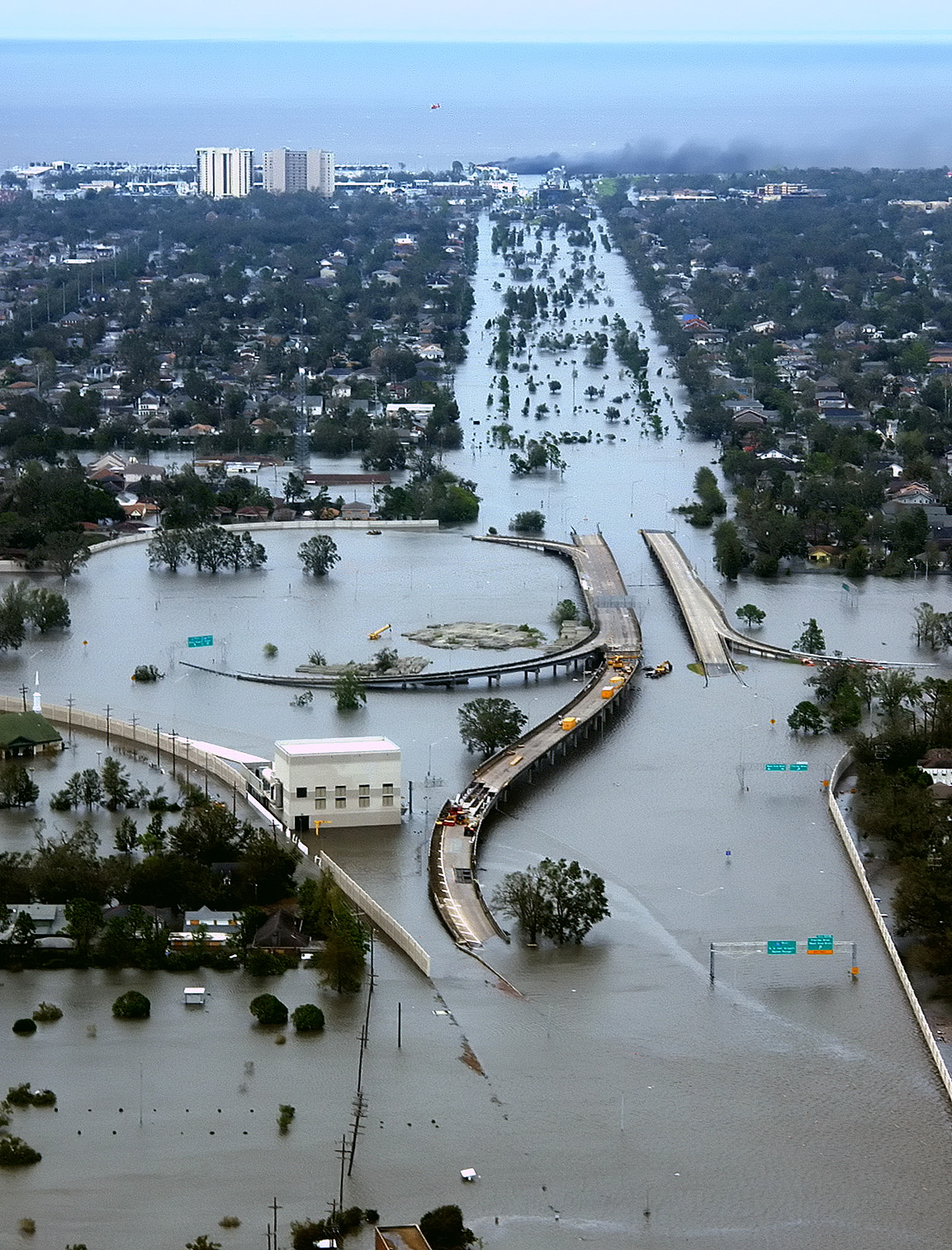
2005 flooding in New Orleans, caused by Hurricane Katrina.

- July 7–11, 2005 – Hurricane Dennis caused damage in the Caribbean and southeastern United States. Dennis killed a total of 88 people and caused $3.71 billion in damages.
- August 28–29, 2005 – Hurricane Katrina made landfall in Louisiana and Mississippi, devastating the city of New Orleans and nearby coastal areas. Katrina was recognized as the costliest natural disaster in the United States at the time, after causing a record $108 billion in damages (a record later surpassed by Hurricane Harvey in 2017). Katrina caused over 1,200 deaths.
- September 25, 2006 – Typhoon Xangsane (known in the Philippines as Super Typhoon Milenyo) struck the Philippines, Vietnam and Thailand, killing over 300 and caused $747 million in damage.
- November 30, 2006 – Typhoon Durian (known in the Philippines as Typhoon Reming) affected the Philippines' Bicol Region, and together with a concurrent eruption of Mayon Volcano, caused mudflows and killed more than 1,200 people.
- August 30, 2007 – Group of Croatian firefighters who were flown in on the island Kornat as part of the 2007 coast fires firefighting efforts perished. Twelve out of thirteen men who found themselves surrounded by fire were killed in the event which was the biggest loss of lives in the history of Croatian firefighting.
- May 3, 2008 – Cyclone Nargis had an extreme impact in Myanmar, causing nearly 140,000 deaths and $10 billion in damages.
- June 21, 2008 – Typhoon Fengshen (called Typhoon Frank in the Philippines) struck the central Philippines, causing over 1,400 deaths and $480 million in damage. The cyclone also caused the sinking of the ferry MV Princess of the Stars, killing more than 800 on Board.
- February 7 – March 14, 2009 – The Black Saturday bushfires, the deadliest bushfires in Australian history, took place across the Australian state of Victoria during extreme bushfire-weather conditions, killing 173 people, injuring more than 500, and leaving around 7,500 homeless. The fires came after Melbourne recorded the highest-ever temperature (46.4 °C or 115.5 °F) of any capital city in Australia. The majority of the fires were caused by either fallen or clashing power lines, or arson.
- September–October 2009 – Typhoon Ketsana (known in the Philippines as Tropical Storm Ondoy) caused flooding in Luzon, Philippines, mostly in Metro Manila, killing nearly 700 people in total. Flood levels reached a record of 20 ft (6.1 m) in rural areas. Days after Ketsana left the Philippines, Typhoon Parma (known as Typhoon Pepeng in the Philippines) made landfall three times, causing widespread flooding in northern Luzon; 500 were killed and damage totaled $560 million.
- Winter of 2009–2010 – The winter of 2009–2010 saw abnormally cold temperatures in Europe, Asia, and America. A total of 21 people were reported to have died as a result of the cold in the British Isles. On December 26, 2009, Saint Petersburg, Russia, was covered by 35 cm of snow, the largest December snowfall recorded in the city since 1881.

==== Epidemics ====
Antibiotic resistance is a serious and growing phenomenon in contemporary medicine and has emerged as one of the eminent public health concerns of the 21st century, particularly as it pertains to pathogenic organisms (the term is not especially relevant to organisms which don't cause disease in humans).

The outbreak of foot-and-mouth disease in the United Kingdom in 2001 caused a crisis in British agriculture and tourism. This epizootic saw 2,000 cases of the disease in farms across most of the British countryside. Over 6 million sheep and cattle were killed.

Between November 2002 and July 2003, an outbreak of severe acute respiratory syndrome (SARS) occurred in Hong Kong, with 8,273 cases and 775 deaths worldwide (9.6% fatality) according to the World Health Organization (WHO). Within weeks, SARS spread from Hong Kong to infect individuals in 37 countries in early 2003.

Methicillin-resistant Staphylococcus aureus: the Office for National Statistics reported 1,629 MRSA-related deaths in England and Wales during 2005, indicating a MRSA-related mortality rate half the rate of that in the United States for 2005, even though the figures from the British source were explained to be high because of "improved levels of reporting, possibly brought about by the continued high public profile of the disease" during the time of the 2005 United Kingdom General Election. MRSA is thought to have caused 1,652 deaths in 2006 in UK up from 51 in 1993.

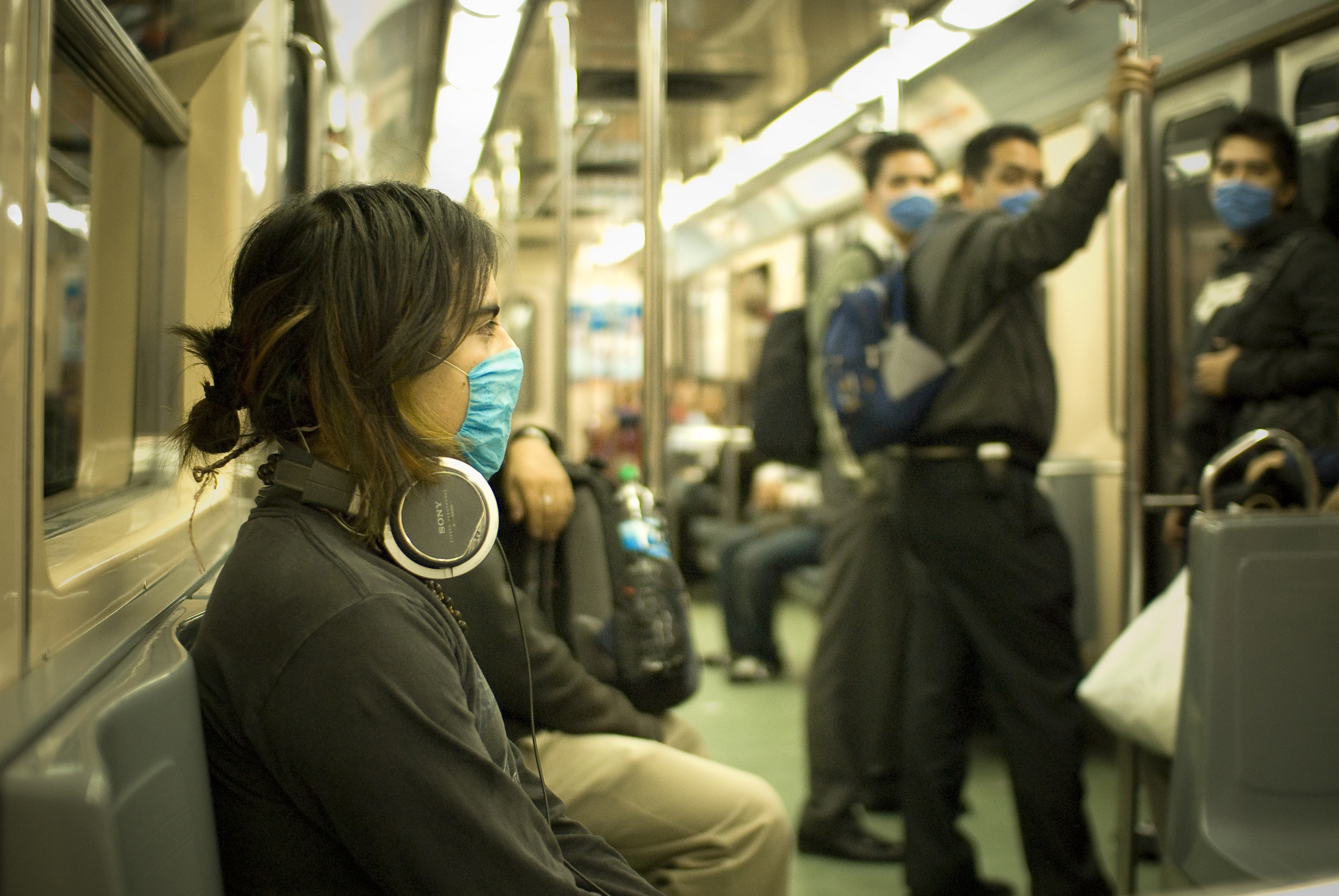
People in Mexico City wear masks on a train due to the swine flu outbreak, April 2009

The 2009 H1N1 (swine flu) flu pandemic was also considered a natural disaster. On October 25, 2009, U.S. president Barack Obama officially declared H1N1 a national emergency. Despite President Obama's concern, a Fairleigh Dickinson University PublicMind poll found in October 2009 that an overwhelming majority of New Jerseyans (74%) were not very worried or not at all worried about contracting the H1N1 flu virus.

A study conducted in coordination with the University of Michigan Health Service is scheduled for publication in the December 2009 American Journal of Roentgenology warning that H1N1 flu can cause pulmonary embolism, surmised as a leading cause of death in this current pandemic. The study authors suggest physician evaluation via contrast enhanced CT scans for the presence of pulmonary emboli when caring for patients diagnosed with respiratory complications from a "severe" case of the H1N1 flu.

As of May 30, 2010, as stated by the World Health Organization, more than 214 countries and overseas territories or communities have reported laboratory confirmed cases of pandemic influenza H1N1 2009, including over 18,138 deaths.

=== Non-natural disasters ===
==== Vehicular wrecks ====
- On January 31, 2000, Alaska Airlines Flight 261 crashed into the Pacific Ocean off the coast of California after the plane's jackscrew failed, killing all 88 on board.
- On July 25, 2000, Air France Flight 4590, a Concorde aircraft, crashed into a hotel in Gonesse just after takeoff from Paris, killing all 109 aboard and 4 in the hotel. This was the only Concorde accident in which fatalities occurred. It was the beginning of the end for Concorde as an airliner; the type was retired three years later.
- On August 12, 2000, the Russian submarine K-141 Kursk sank in the Barents Sea, killing all 118 men on board.
- On November 11, 2000, the Kaprun disaster occurred. 155 people perished in a fire that broke out on a train in the Austrian Alps.
- On October 8, 2001, two aircraft collided on a runway at the Linate Airport in Milan, Italy, killing all 114 people aboard both aircraft and 4 people on the ground.
- On November 12, 2001, American Airlines Flight 587 crashed into a neighborhood in Queens, New York City, killing all 260 aboard and 5 people on the ground.
- On May 25, 2002, China Airlines Flight 611 broke up in mid-air and plunged into the Taiwan Strait, killing all 225 people on board.
- On July 1, 2002, a Tupolev Tu-154 passenger airliner and a Boeing 757 cargo plane collided above the German town of Überlingen. All 71 people on both aircraft died.
- On July 27, 2002, a Sukhoi Su-27 fighter jet crashed at an air show in Ukraine, killing 77 and injuring 543, making it the worst air show disaster in history.
- On September 26, 2002, the ferry MV Le Joola sank off the coast of Gambia, killing at least 1,863 people.
- On February 1, 2003, at the conclusion of the STS-107 mission, the Space Shuttle Columbia disintegrated during reentry over Texas, killing all seven astronauts on board.
- On February 19, 2003, an Ilyushin Il-76 military aircraft crashed outside the Iranian city of Kerman, killing 275.
- On August 14, 2005, Helios Airways Flight 522 crashed into a mountain north of Marathon, Greece, while flying from Larnaca, Cyprus, to Athens, Greece. All 115 passengers and six crew on board the aircraft were killed.
- On August 16, 2005, West Caribbean Airways Flight 708 crashed in a remote region of Venezuela, killing 160.
- On September 29, 2006, Gol Transportes Aéreos Flight 1907 collided with a new Embraer Legacy 600 business jet over the Brazilian Amazon and crashed, killing all 154 people on board. The Embraer aircraft made an emergency landing at a nearby military outpost with no harm to its seven occupants.
- On December 30, 2006, the ferry MV Senopati Nusantara sank in a storm in the Java Sea, killing between 400 and 500 of the 628 people aboard. Two days later, Adam Air Flight 574 crashed in the same storm, killing all 102 people on board.
- On July 17, 2007, TAM Airlines Flight 3054 skidded off the runway at Congonhas-São Paulo Airport and crashed into a nearby warehouse, leaving 199 people dead.
- On February 12, 2009, Colgan Air Flight 3407 crashed on approach in Buffalo, New York, killing 50.
- On June 1, 2009, Air France Flight 447 crashed into the southern Atlantic Ocean after instrument failure disoriented the crew. All 228 people on board perished.
- On June 30, 2009, Yemenia Flight 626 crashed into the Indian Ocean near the Comoros islands. Of the 153 people on board, only 12-year-old Bahia Bakari survived.

==== Crowd crushes and collapses ====
- Two separate crowd collapses (in 2004 and 2006 respectively) during the annual Hajj in Mecca, Saudi Arabia killed 245 and 345 pilgrims respectively.
- January 25, 2005: 291 pilgrims died after a fatal crowd collapse at a Hindu temple in Maharashtra, India.
- August 31, 2005 – 953 people died following a stampede on Al-Aaimmah bridge, which crosses the Tigris river in the Iraqi capital of Baghdad.
- September 30, 2008: Rumors of a bomb planted inside a Hindu temple in Jodhpur, India caused a crowd crush killing 224 pilgrims and injuring 425 others.

== Economics ==
The most significant evolution of the 2000s in the economic landscape was the long-time predicted breakthrough of economic giant China, whose GDP grew from 1.21 trillion to 5.1 trillion (in 2022 USD). To a lesser extent, India also benefited from an economic boom (growing from 438.39 billion to 1.34 trillion) which saw the two most populous countries becoming an increasingly dominant economic force. The rapid catching-up of emerging economies with developed countries sparked some protectionist tensions during the period and was partly responsible for an increase in energy and food prices at the end of the decade. The economic developments in the latter third of the decade were dominated by a worldwide economic downturn, which started with the crisis in housing and credit in the United States in late 2007, and led to the bankruptcy of major banks and other financial institutions. The outbreak of the 2008 financial crisis sparked a global recession, beginning in the United States and affecting most of the industrialized world.

- A study by the World Institute for Development Economics Research at United Nations University reports that the richest 1% of adults alone owned 40% of global assets in the year 2000. The three richest people possess more financial assets than the lowest 48 nations combined.

The combined wealth of the "10 million dollar millionaires" grew to nearly $41 trillion in 2008.

- The sale of UK gold reserves, 1999–2002 was a policy pursued by HM Treasury when gold prices were at their lowest in 20 years, following an extended recession. The period itself has been dubbed by some commentators as the Brown Bottom or Brown's Bottom.

The period takes its name from Gordon Brown, the then UK chancellor of the exchequer (who later became Prime Minister), who decided to sell approximately half of the UK's gold reserves in a series of auctions. At the time, the UK's gold reserves were worth about US$6.5 billion, accounting for about half of the UK's US$13 billion foreign currency net reserves.

- The 2001 AOL merger with Time Warner (a deal valued at $350 billion; which was the largest merger in American business history) was 'the biggest mistake in corporate history', believes Time Warner chief Jeff Bewkes
- February 7, 2004 – EuroMillions transnational lottery, launched by France's Française des Jeux, Spain's Loterías y Apuestas del Estado, and the United Kingdom's Camelot.
- In 2007, it was reported that in the UK, one pound in every seven spent went to the Tesco grocery and general merchandise retailer.
- On October 9, 2007, the Dow Jones Industrial Average closed at the record level of 14,164.53. Two days later on October 11, the Dow would trade at its highest intra-day level ever, at the 14,198.10 mark. In what would normally take many years to accomplish; numerous reasons were cited for the Dow's extremely rapid rise from the 11,000 level in early 2006, to the 14,000 level in late 2007. They included future possible takeovers and mergers, healthy earnings reports particularly in the tech sector, and moderate inflationary numbers; fueling speculation the Federal Reserve would not raise interest rates. Roughly on par with the 2000 record when adjusted for inflation, this represented the final high of the cyclical bull. The index closed 2007 at 13,264.82, a level it would not surpass for nearly five years.

=== Economic growth in the world ===
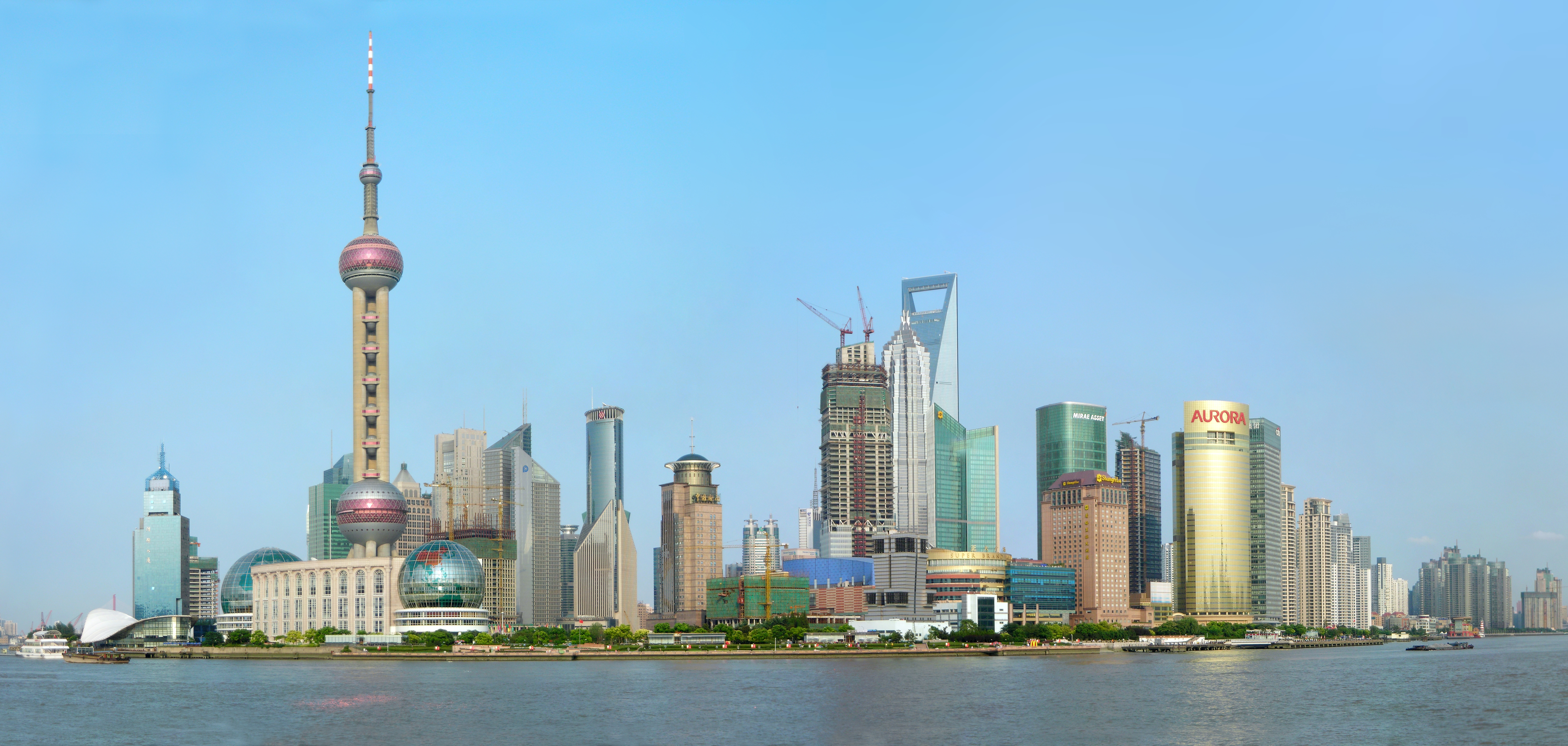
Shanghai becomes a symbol of the recent economic boom of China.

Between 1999 and 2009, according to the World Bank statistics for GDP:

- The world economy by nominal GDP almost doubled in size from U.S. $30.21 trillion in 1999 to U.S. $58.23 trillion in 2009. This figure is not adjusted for inflation. By PPP, world GDP rose 78%, according to the IMF. But inflation adjusted nominal GDP rose only 42%, according to IMF constant price growth rates. The following figures are not inflation adjusted nominal GDP and should be interpreted with extreme caution:
- The United States (U.S. $14.26 trillion) retained its position of possessing the world's largest economy. However, the size of its contribution to the total global economy dropped from 28.8% to 24.5% by nominal price or a fall from 23.8% to 20.4% adjusted for purchasing power.
- Japan (U.S. $5.07 trillion) retained its position of possessing the second largest economy in the world, but its contribution to the world economy also shrank significantly from 14.5% to 8.7% by nominal price or a fall from 7.8% to 6.0% adjusted for purchasing power.
- China (U.S. $4.98 trillion) went from being the sixth largest to the third largest economy, and in 2009 contributed to 8.6% of the world's economy, up from 3.3% in 1999 by nominal price or a rise from 6.9% to 12.6% adjusted for purchasing power.
- Germany (U.S. $3.35 trillion), France (U.S. $2.65 trillion), United Kingdom (U.S. $2.17 trillion) and Italy (U.S. $2.11 trillion) followed as the 4th, 5th, 6th and 7th largest economies, respectively in 2009.
- Brazil (U.S. $1.57 trillion) retained its position as the 8th largest economy, followed by Spain (U.S. $1.46 trillion), which remained at 10th.
- Other major economies included Canada (U.S. $1.34 trillion; 10th, down from 9th), India (U.S. $1.31 trillion; remaining at 11th from 12th), Russia (U.S. $1.23 trillion; from 16th to 12th) Mexico (U.S. $875 billion; 14th, down from 11th), Australia (U.S. $925 billion; from 14th to 13th) and South Korea (U.S. $832 billion; 15th, down from 13th).
- In terms of purchasing power parity in 2009, the ten largest economies were the United States (U.S. $14.26 trillion), China (U.S. $9.10 trillion), Japan (U.S. $4.14 trillion), India (U.S. $3.75 trillion), Germany (U.S. $2.98 trillion), Russia (U.S. $2.69 trillion), United Kingdom (U.S. $2.26 trillion), France (U.S. $2.17 trillion), Brazil (U.S. $2.02 trillion), and Italy (U.S. $1.92 trillion).
- The average house price in the UK, increased by 132% between the fourth quarter of 2000, and 91% during the decade; but the average salary increased only by 40%.

=== Globalization and its discontents ===
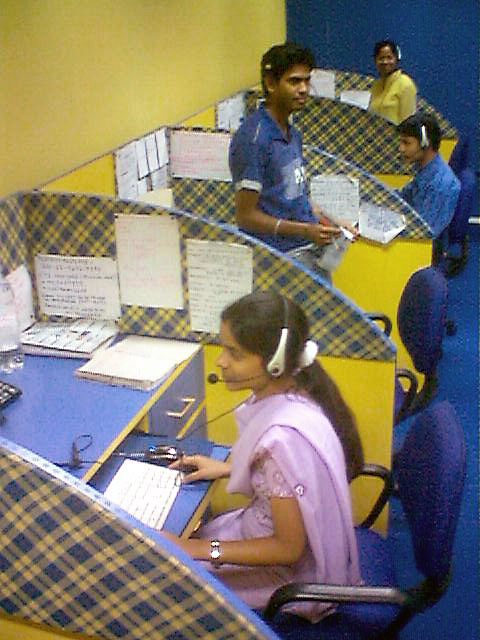
Offshore outsourcing of jobs, such as this call centre in India, significantly increased during the decade as many multinational corporations moved their manufacturing and services from western countries to developing countries.

The removal of trade and investment barriers, the growth of domestic markets, artificially low currencies, the proliferation of education, the rapid development of high tech and information systems industries and the growth of the world economy lead to a significant growth of offshore outsourcing during the decade as many multinational corporations significantly increased subcontracting of manufacturing (and increasingly, services) across national boundaries in developing countries and particularly in China and India, due to many benefits and mainly because the two countries which are the two most populous countries in the world provide huge pools from which to find talent and as because both countries are low cost sourcing countries. As a result of this growth, many of these developing countries accumulated capital and started investing abroad. Other countries, including the United Arab Emirates, Australia, Brazil and Russia, benefited from increased demand for their mineral and energy resources that global growth generated. The hollowing out of manufacturing was felt in Japan and parts of the United States and Europe which had not been able to develop successful innovative industries. Opponents point out that the practice of offshore outsourcing by countries with higher wages leads to the reduction of their own domestic employment and domestic investment. As a result, many customer service jobs as well as jobs in the information technology sectors (data processing, computer programming, and technical support) in countries such as the United States and the United Kingdom have been or are potentially affected.

While global trade rose in the decade (partially driven by China's entry into the WTO in 2001), there was little progress in the multilateral trading system. International trade continued to expand during the decade as emerging economies and developing countries, in particular China and South-Asian countries, benefited low wages costs and most often undervalued currencies. However, global negotiations to reduce tariffs did not make much progress, as member countries of the World Trade Organization did not succeed in finding agreements to stretch the extent of free trade. The Doha Round of negotiations, launched in 2001 by the WTO to promote development, failed to be completed because of growing tensions between regional areas. Nor did the Cancún Conference in 2003 find a consensus on services trade and agricultural subsidies.

The comparative rise of China, India, and other developing countries also contributed to their growing clout in international forums. In 2009, it was determined that the G20, originally a forum of finance ministers and central bank governors, would replace the G8 as the main economic council.

2007 Chinese export recalls – in 2007, a series of product recalls and import bans were imposed by the product safety institutions of the United States, Canada, the European Union, Australia and New Zealand against products manufactured in and exported from the mainland of the People's Republic of China (PRC) because of numerous alleged consumer safety issues.

Events in the confidence crisis included recalls on consumer goods such as pet food, toys, toothpaste, lipstick, and a ban on certain types of seafood. Also included are reports on the poor crash safety of Chinese automobiles, slated to enter the American and European markets in 2008. This created adverse consequences for the confidence in the safety and quality of mainland Chinese manufactured goods in the global economy.

=== The age of turbulence ===
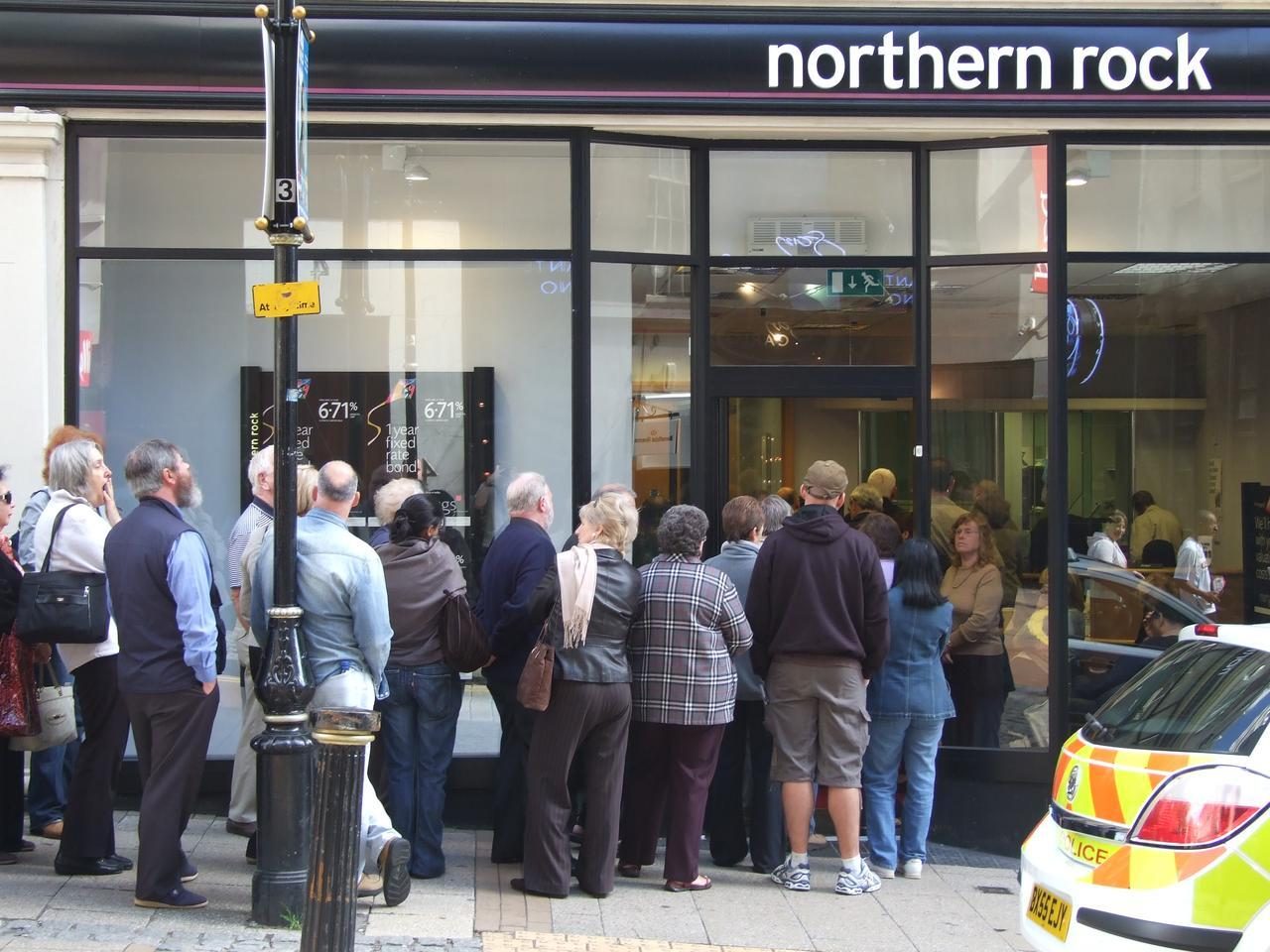
People queuing outside a Northern Rock bank branch in Birmingham, United Kingdom on September 15, 2007, to withdraw their savings because of the Subprime mortgage crisis.

The decade was marked by two financial and economic crises. In 2001, the Dot-com bubble burst, causing turmoil in financial markets and a decline in economic activity in the developed economies, in particular in the United States. However, the impact of the crisis on the activity was limited thanks to the intervention of the central banks, notably the U.S. Federal Reserve System. Indeed, Alan Greenspan, leader of the Federal Reserve until 2006, cut the interest rates several times to avoid a severe recession, allowing an economic revival in the U.S.

As the Federal Reserve maintained low interest rates to favor economic growth, a housing bubble began to appear in the United States. In 2007, the rise in interest rates and the collapse of the housing market caused a wave of loan payment failures in the U.S. The subsequent subprime mortgage crisis caused the 2008 financial crisis, because the subprime mortgages had been securitized and sold to international banks and investment funds. Despite the extensive intervention of central banks, including partial and total nationalization of major European banks, the crisis of sovereign debt became particularly acute, first in Iceland, though as events of the early 2010s would show, it was not an isolated European example. Economic activity was severely affected around the world in 2008 and 2009, with disastrous consequences for carmakers.

In 2007, the UK's chancellor of the exchequer Gordon Brown, delivered his final Mansion House speech as Chancellor before he moved into Number 10. Addressing financiers: "A new world order has been created", Everyone needed to follow the city's "great example", "an era that history will record as the beginning of a new Golden Age".

Reactions of governments in all developed and developing countries against the economic slowdown were largely inspired by keynesian economics. The end of the decade was characterized by a Keynesian resurgence, while the influence and media popularity of left-wing economists Joseph Stiglitz and Paul Krugman (Nobel Prize recipients in 2001 and 2008, respectively) did not stop growing during the decade. Several international summits were organized to find solutions against the economic crisis and to impose greater control on the financial markets. The G20 became in 2008 and 2009 a major organization, as leaders of the member countries held two major summits in Washington in November 2008 and in London in April 2009 to regulate the banking and financial sectors, and also succeeding in coordinating their economic action and in avoiding protectionist reactions.

=== Energy crisis ===
Increase in oil prices

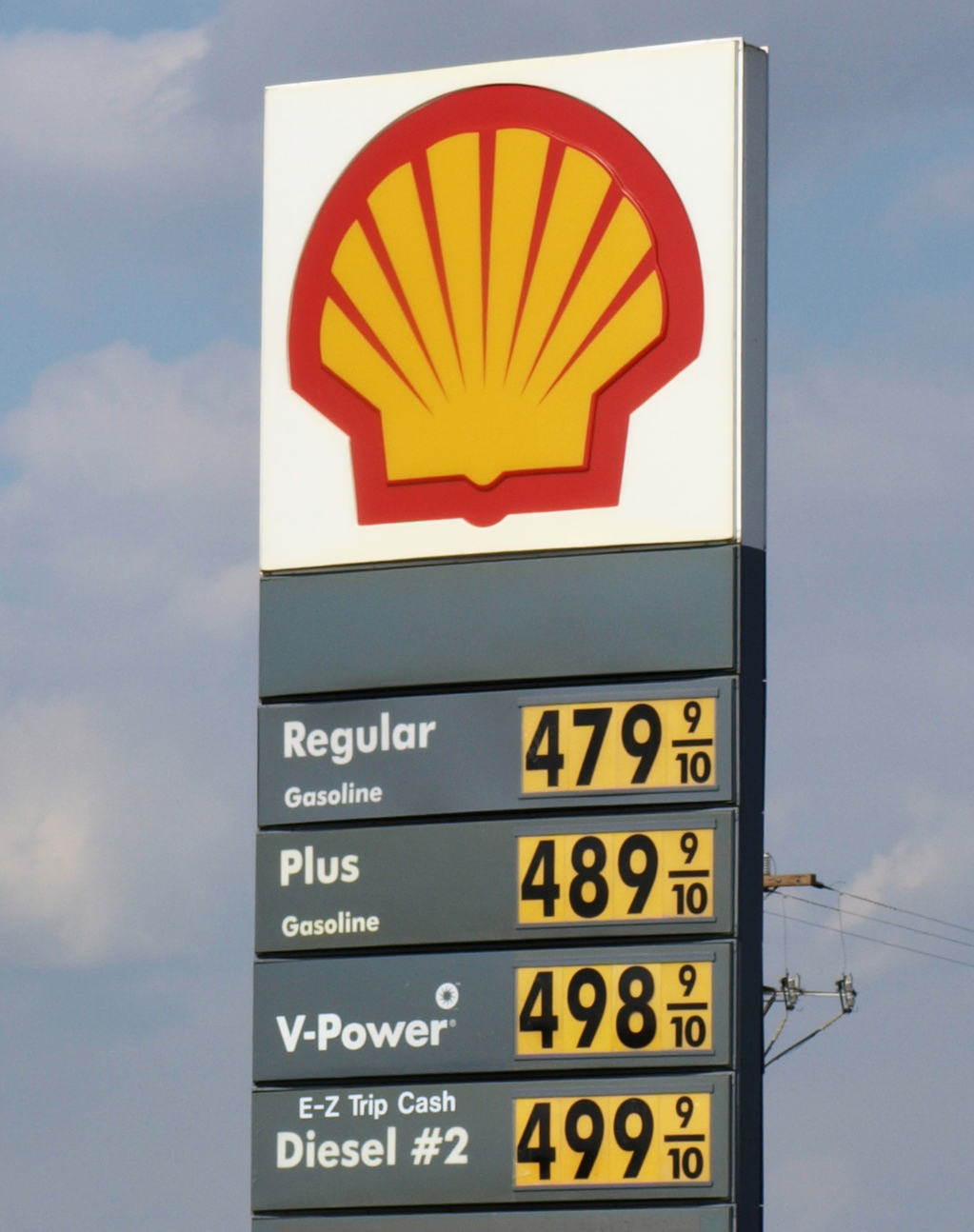
Gas prices in late May 2008

From the mid-1980s to September 2003, the inflation-adjusted price of a barrel of crude oil on NYMEX was generally under $25/barrel. During 2003, the price rose above $30, reached $60 by August 11, 2005, and peaked at $147.30 in July 2008. Commentators attributed these price increases to many factors, including reports from the United States Department of Energy and others showing a decline in petroleum reserves, worries over peak oil, Middle East tension, and oil price speculation.

For a time, geopolitical events and natural disasters indirectly related to the global oil market had strong short-term effects on oil prices. These events and disasters included North Korean missile tests, the 2006 conflict between Israel and Lebanon, worries over Iranian nuclear plants in 2006 and Hurricane Katrina. By 2008, such pressures appeared to have an insignificant impact on oil prices given the onset of the global recession. The recession caused demand for energy to shrink in late 2008 and early 2009 and the price plunged as well. However, it surged back in May 2009, bringing it back to November 2008 levels.

Many fast-growing economies throughout the world, especially in Asia, also were a major factor in the rapidly increasing demand for fossil fuels, which—along with fewer new petroleum finds, greater extraction costs, and political turmoil—forced two other trends: a soar in the price of petroleum products and a push by governments and businesses to promote the development of environmentally friendly technology (known informally as "green" technology). However, a side-effect of the push by some industrial nations to "go green" and utilize biofuels was a decrease in the supply of food and a subsequent increase in the price of the same. It partially caused the 2007 food price crisis, which seriously affected the world's poorer nations with an even more severe shortage of food.

=== The rise of the euro ===
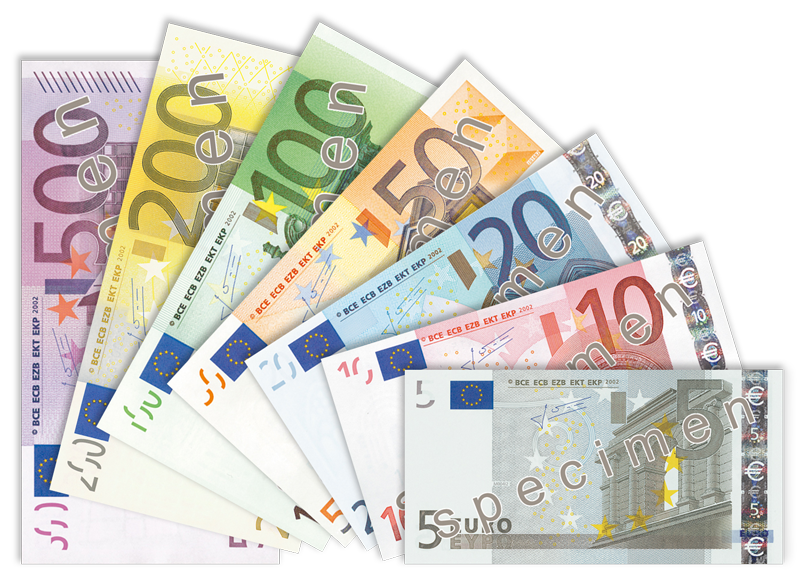
The euro became the currency of members of the Eurozone.

A common currency for most EU member states, the euro, was established electronically in 1999, officially tying all the currencies of each participating nation to each other. The new currency was put into circulation in 2002 and the old currencies were phased out. Only three countries of the then 15 member states decided not to join the euro (the United Kingdom, Denmark and Sweden). In 2004 the EU undertook a major eastward enlargement, admitting 10 new member states (eight of which were former communist states). Two more, Bulgaria and Romania, joined in 2007, establishing a union of 27 nations.

The euro has since become the second largest reserve currency and the second most traded currency in the world after the US$. As of October 2009, with more than €790 billion in circulation, the euro was the currency with the highest combined value of banknotes and coins in circulation in the world, having surpassed the US$. (Note: As of October 30, 2009: Total EUR currency (coins and banknotes) in circulation 771.5 (banknotes) + 21.032 (coins) =792.53 billion EUR *1.48 (exchange rate) = 1,080 billion USD Total USD currency (coins and banknotes) in circulation 859 billion USD: "Table 2: Euro banknotes, values (EUR billions, unless otherwise indicated, not seasonally adjusted)" (PDF). ECB. Archived from the original (PDF) on February 22, 2010. "2009, October: Total banknotes: 771.5 (billion EUR)"; "Table 4: Euro coins, values (EUR millions, unless otherwise indicated, not seasonally adjusted)" (PDF). ECB. Archived from the original (PDF) on February 22, 2010. "2009, October: Total coins: 21,032 (million EUR)"; "Money Stock Measures". Federal Reserve Statistical Release. Board of Governors of the Federal Reserve System. Archived from the original on December 9, 2009. "Table 5: Not Seasonally Adjusted Components of M1 (Billions of dollars), not seasonally adjusted, October 2009: Currency: 859.3 (billion USD)"; "Euro foreign exchange reference rates". ECB. Archived from the original on March 25, 2014. "Exchange rate October 30, 2009: 1 EUR = 1.48 USD")

== Science and technology ==
=== Science ===
==== Scientific Marks by Field ====
===== Archaeology =====
- 2003 – Fossils of a new dwarf species of human, Homo floresiensis, were discovered on the island of Flores, Indonesia. (report published initially October 2004).
- 2009 – Discovery of Ardipithecus ramidus' a species of Hominin classified as an australopithecine of the genus Ardipithecus. A. kadabba was considered to be a subspecies of A. ramidus until 2004.

===== Biology =====
- 2001 – The world's first self-contained artificial heart was implanted in Robert Tools.
- 2002 – The 2002–2004 SARS outbreak occurred in China and Hong Kong.
- 2003 – The Human Genome Project was completed, with a 92% accuracy.
- 2005 – National Geographic Society and IBM established The Genographic Project, which aims to trace the ancestry of every living human down to a single male ancestor.
- 2005 – Surgeons in France carried out the first successful partial human face transplant.
- 2005 – Equipped with genome data and field observations of organisms from microbes to mammals, biologists made huge strides toward understanding the mechanisms by which living creatures evolve.
- 2006 – Australian scientist Ian Frazer developed a vaccine for the Human Papillomavirus, a common cause of cervical cancer.
- 2007 – RNA, long upstaged by its more glamorous sibling, DNA, is turning out to have star qualities of its own. Science hails these electrifying discoveries, which are prompting biologists to overhaul their vision of the cell and its evolution.
- 2008 – By inserting genes that turn back a cell's developmental clock, researchers are gaining insights into disease and the biology of how a cell decides its fate.
- 2008 – Launch of the 1000 Genomes Project an international research effort to establish by far the most detailed catalogue of human genetic variation.
- 2009 – Launch of the Human Connectome Project to build a network map that will shed light on the anatomical and functional connectivity within the healthy human brain, as well as to produce a body of data that will facilitate research into brain disorders.
- 2009 – A new strain of H1N1 virus first detected in Mexico spread to the world, resulting in the 2009 swine flu pandemic.

===== Mathematics =====
- 2006 – Grigori Perelman is a Russian mathematician who has made landmark contributions to Riemannian geometry and geometric topology. In 2003, he proved Thurston's geometrization conjecture. This consequently solved in the affirmative the Poincaré conjecture, posed in 1904, which before its solution was viewed as one of the most important and difficult open problems in topology. In August 2006, Perelman was awarded the Fields Medal for "his contributions to geometry and his revolutionary insights into the analytical and geometric structure of the Ricci flow." Perelman declined to accept the award or to appear at the congress, stating: "I'm not interested in money or fame, I don't want to be on display like an animal in a zoo." On December 22, 2006, the journal Science recognized Perelman's proof of the Poincaré conjecture as the scientific "Breakthrough of the Year", the first such recognition in the area of mathematics. The Poincaré conjecture is one of the seven Millennium Problems and the first to be solved.

===== Physics =====
- 2001 – Scientists assembled molecules into basic circuits, raising hopes for a new world of nanoelectronics. If researchers can wire these circuits into intricate computer chip architectures, this new generation of molecular electronics will undoubtedly provide computing power to launch scientific breakthroughs for decades.
- 2008 – CERN's Large Hadron Collider, the world's largest and highest-energy particle accelerator ever made, was completed in 2008.

===== Space =====
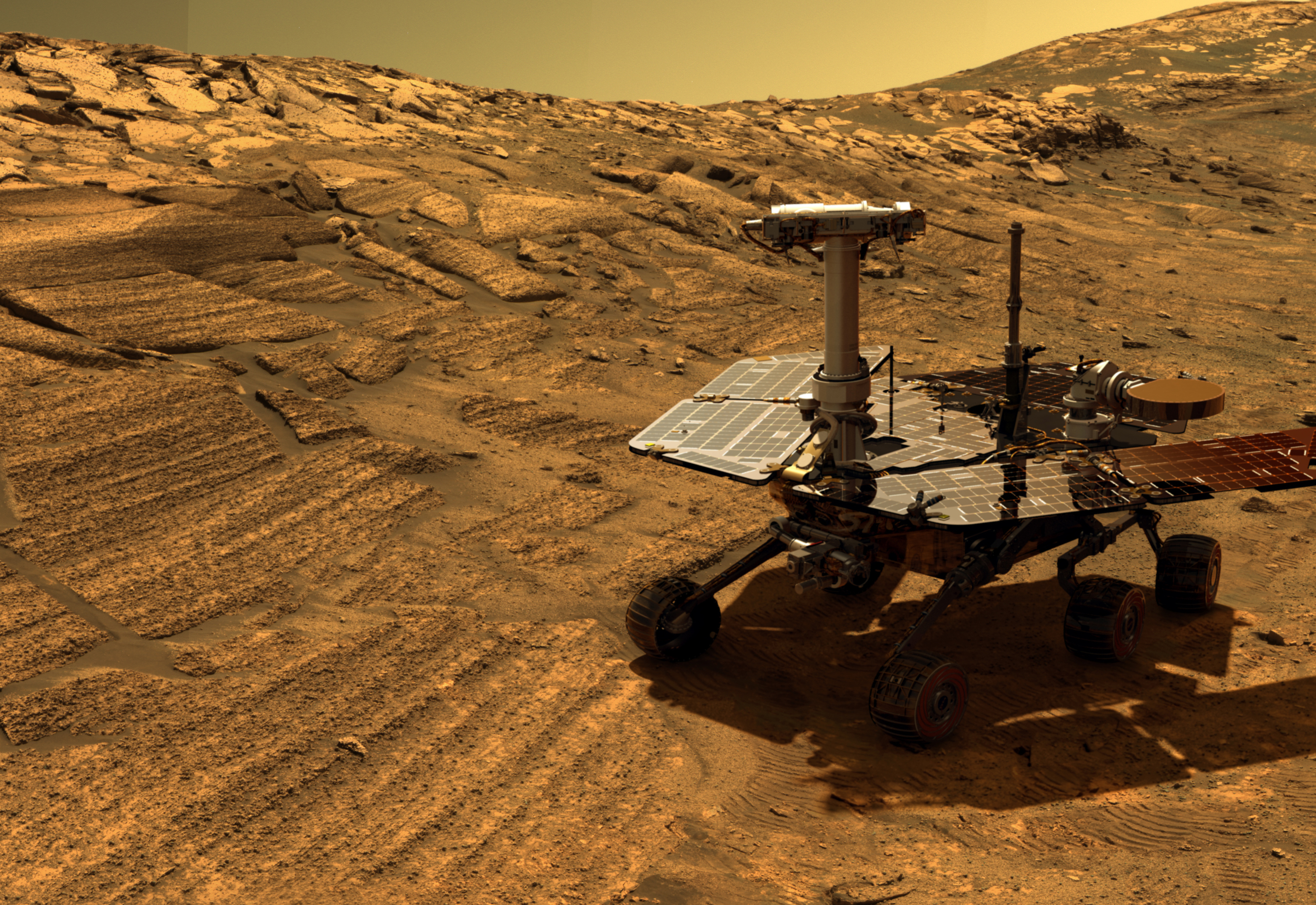
Artist Concept of the NASA Mars Exploration Rover Opportunity on Mars

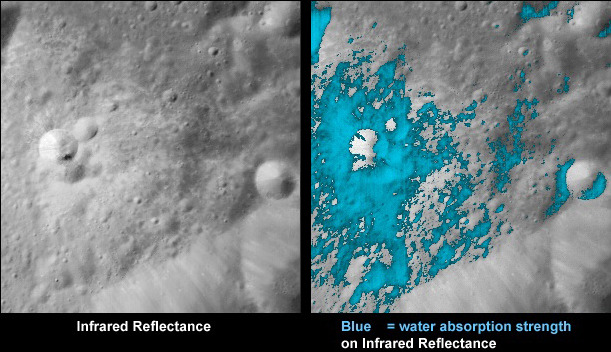
These images show water in a very young lunar crater on the side of the Moon that faces away from Earth.

- 2000 – Beginning on November 2, 2000, the International Space Station has remained continuously inhabited. The Space Shuttles helped make it the largest space station in history, despite one of the Shuttles disintegrating upon re-entry in 2003. By the end of 2009 the station was supporting 5 long-duration crew members.
- 2001 – Space tourism/Private spaceflight begins with American Dennis Tito, paying Russia US$20 million for a week-long stay to the International Space Station.
- 2004 – The Mars Exploration Rover (MER) Mission successfully reached the surface of Mars in 2004, and sent detailed data and images of the landscape there back to Earth. Opportunity discovers evidence that an area of Mars was once covered in water. Both rovers were each expected to last only 90 days, however both completely exceeded expectations and continued to explore through the end of the decade and beyond.
- 2004 – Scaled Composites' SpaceShipOne becomes the first privately built and operated crewed spacecraft to achieve spaceflight.
- 2004 – Cassini-Huygens becomes the first space probe to orbit Saturn, with Huygens landing on the moon Titan in 2005.
- 2004 – The astrophysicist and radio astronomer Naomi McClure-Griffiths identifies a new spiral arm of the Milky Way galaxy
- 2006 – As a result of the discovery of Eris, a Kuiper Belt object larger than Pluto, Pluto is demoted to a "dwarf planet" after being considered a planet for 76 years, redefining the Solar System to have eight planets and three dwarf planets.
- 2009 – After having analyzed the data from the LCROSS lunar impact, in 2009 NASA announced that the discovery of a "significant" quantity of water in the Moon's Cabeus crater.
- 2009 – Astrophysicists studying the universe confirm its age at 13.7 billion years, discover that it will most likely expand forever without limit, and conclude that only 4% of the universe's contents are ordinary matter (the other 96% being still-mysterious dark matter, dark energy, and dark flow).

=== Technology ===
==== Automobiles ====
- Automotive navigation systems become widely popular making it possible to direct vehicles to any destination in real-time as well as detect traffic and suggest alternate routes with the use of GPS navigation devices.
- Greater interest in future energy development due to global warming and the potential exhaustion of crude oil. Photovoltaics increase in popularity as a result.
- The Hybrid vehicles market, which became somewhat popular towards the middle of the decade, underwent major advances notably typified by such cars as the Toyota Prius, Ford Escape, and the Honda Insight though by December 2010 they accounted for less than 0.5% of the world cars.
- Many more computers and other technologies were implemented in vehicles throughout the decade such as: Xenon HID headlights, GPS, DVD players, self-diagnosing systems, memory systems for car settings, back-up sensors and cameras, in-car media systems, MP3 player compatibility, USB drive compatibility, keyless start and entry, satellite radio, voice-activation, cellphone connectivity, HUD (Head-Up-Display) and infrared cameras. In addition, more safety features were implemented in vehicles throughout the decade such as: advanced pre-collision safety systems, Backup cameras, Blind spot monitor, Adaptive cruise control, Adaptive headlamps, Automatic parking, Lane departure warning systems and the Advanced Automatic Collision Notification system Onstar (on all GM models).
- The sale of Crossovers (CUVs), a type of car-based unibody sports utility vehicle, increased in the 2000s. By 2006, the segment came into strong visibility in the U.S., when crossover sales "made up more than 50% of the overall SUV market".
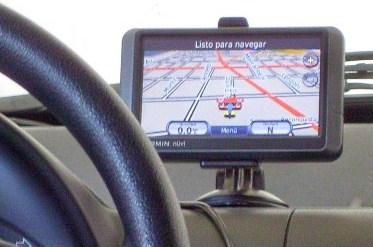
  GPS devices for automobiles gained massive popularity during the decade
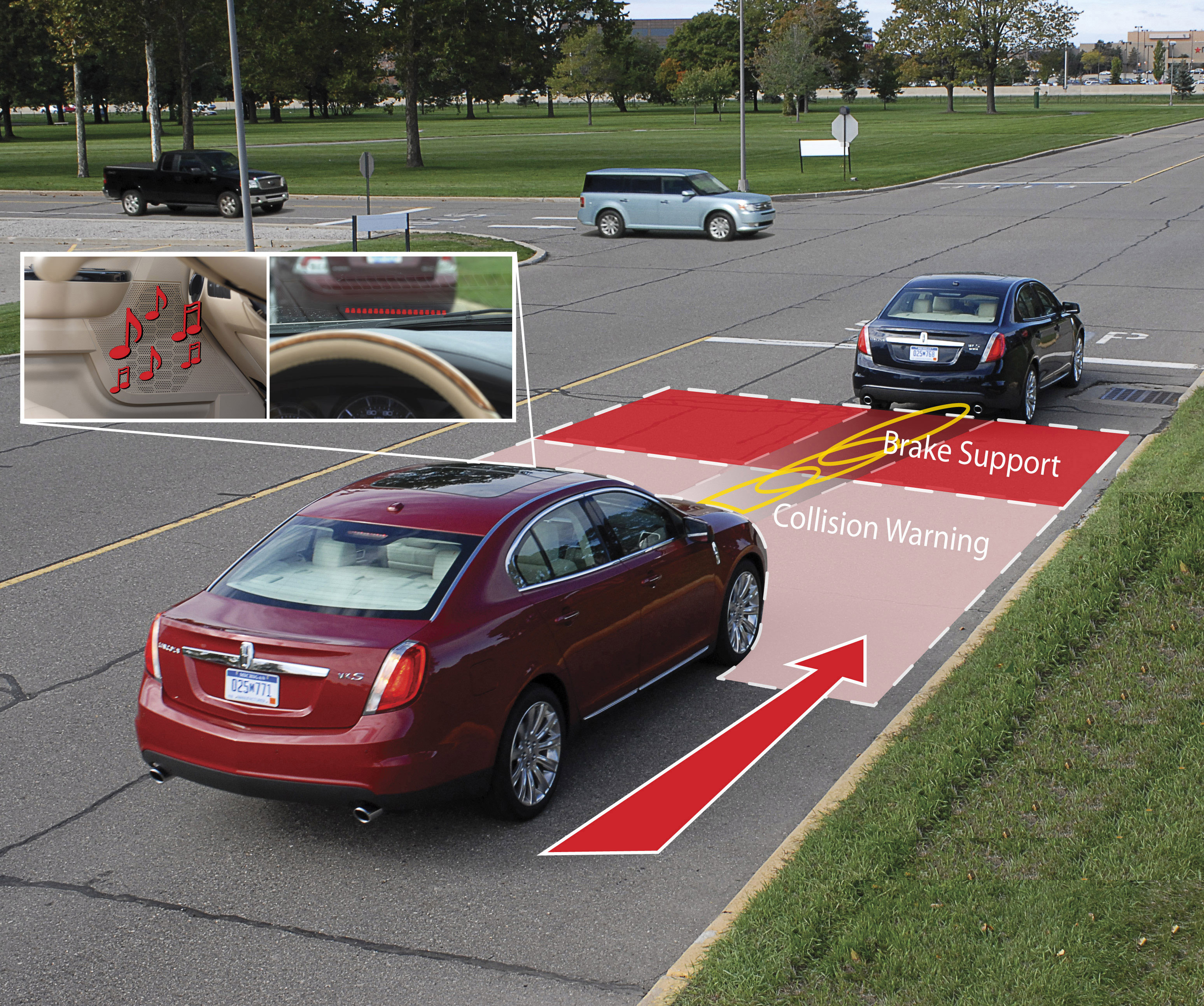
  Collision Warning with Brake Support on the 2009 Lincoln MKS
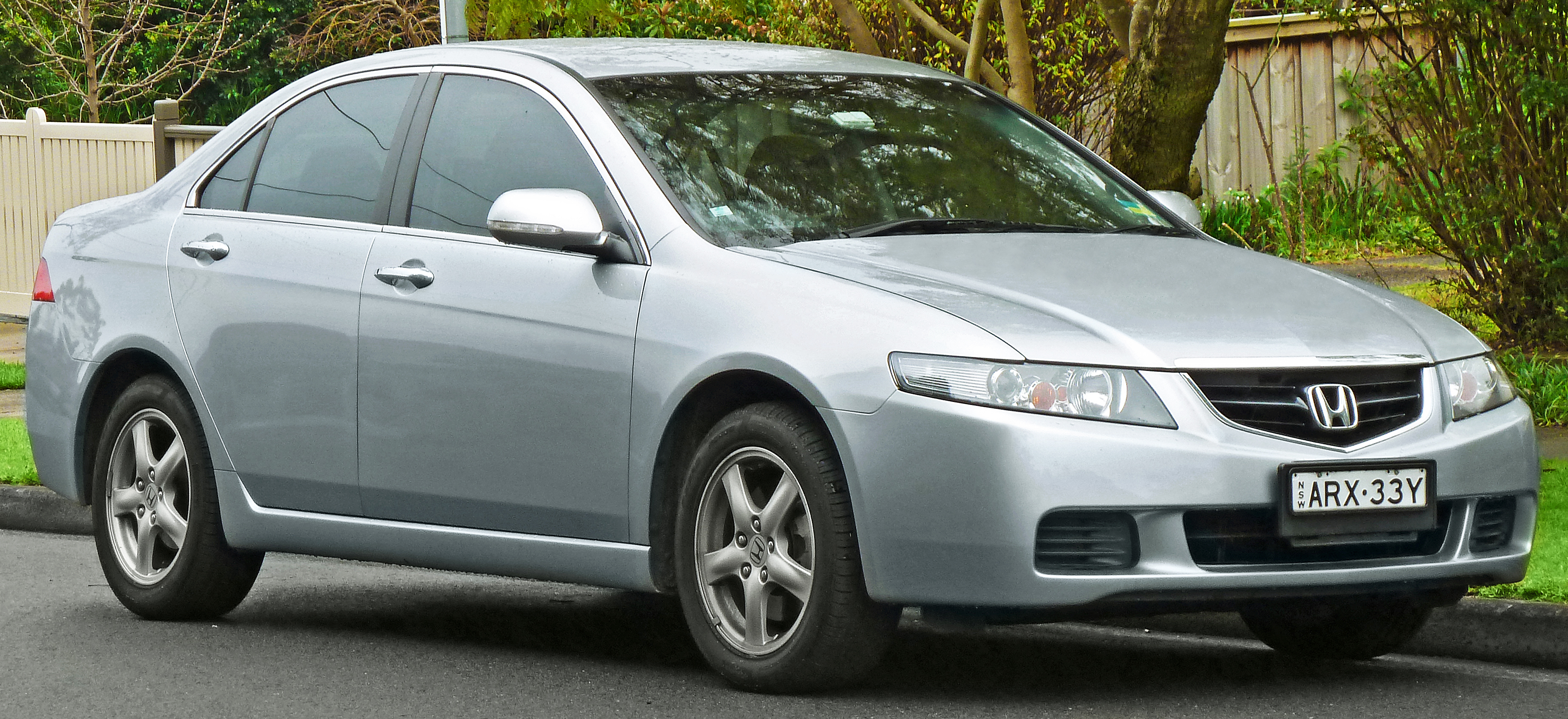
  2004 Honda Accord Euro sedan. A typical mid-2000s car.

==== Communications ====
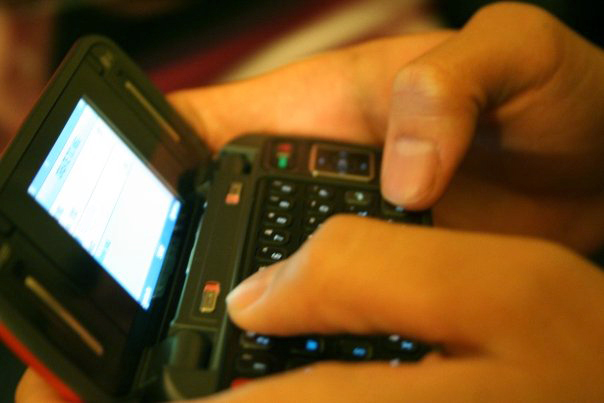
The popularity of mobile phones and text messaging surged in the 2000s in the Western world.

- The popularity of mobile phones and text messaging surged in the 2000s in the Western world. The advent of text messaging made possible new forms of interaction that were not possible before, leading to positive implications such as having the ability to receive information on the move. Nevertheless, it also led to negative social implications such as "cyberbullying" and the rise of traffic collisions caused by drivers who were distracted as they were texting while driving.
- Mobile internet, first launched in Japan with the i-mode in 1999, became increasingly popular with people in developed countries throughout the decade, thanks to improving cell phone capabilities and advances in mobile telecommunications technology, such as GPRS and 3G.
- E-mail continued to be popular throughout the decade. It began to replace "snail mail" (also known, more neutrally, as paper mail, postal mail, land mail, or simply mail or post) as the primary way of sending letters and other messages to people in faraway locations, though it has been available since 1971.
- Social networking sites arose as a new way for people to stay in touch no matter where they are, as long as they have an internet connection. The earliest social networking sites were Friendster, Myspace, Facebook, and Twitter in 2002, 2003, 2004, and 2006, respectively. Myspace was the most popular social networking website until June 2009 when Facebook overtook Myspace in the number of American users.
- Smartphones, which combine mobile phones with the features of personal digital assistants and portable media players, first emerged in the 1990s but did not become popular until the late 2000s. Smartphones are rich in features and often have high resolution touchscreens and web browsers. The first modern smartphone was the iPhone 2G, one of the earliest smartphones to not include a physical keyboard, solely utilizing a touch screen and a home button, which would later become standard across the industry. It was released in June 2007 in the United States, and in November 2007 in a number of territories in Western Europe.
- Due to the major success of broadband Internet connections, VoIP starts to gain popularity as a replacement for traditional telephone lines. VoIP was largely popularized by Skype.

==== Computing and Internet ====
In the 2000s, the Internet became a mainstay, strengthening its grip on Western society while becoming increasingly available in the developing world. The share of the world population using the internet grew from 6.7% to 25.7%.

Google becomes the Internet's most visited website.

- A huge jump in broadband internet usage globally – for example, from 6% of U.S. internet users in June 2000 to what one mid-decade study predicted would be 62% by 2010. By February 2007, over 80% of U.S. Internet users were connected via broadband and broadband internet has been almost a required standard for quality internet browsing.
- Wireless internet became prominent by the end of the decade, as well as internet access in devices besides computers, such as mobile phones and gaming consoles.
- Email became a standard form of interpersonal written communication, with popular addresses available to the public on Hotmail (now Outlook.com), Gmail and Yahoo! Mail.
- Normalisation became increasingly important as massive standardized corpora and lexicons of spoken and written language became widely available to laypeople, just as documents from the paperless office were archived and retrieved with increasing efficiency using XML-based markup.
- Peer-to-peer technology gained massive popularity with file sharing systems enabling users to share any audio, video and data files or anything in digital format, as well as with applications which share real-time data, such as telephony traffic.
- VPNs (virtual private networks) became likewise accessible to the general public, and data encryption remained a major issue for the stability of web commerce.
- Boom in music downloading and the use of data compression to quickly transfer music over the Internet, with a corresponding rise of portable digital audio players. As a result, the entertainment industry struggled through the decade to find digital delivery systems for music, movies, and other media that reduce copyright infringement and preserve profit.
- The USB flash drive replaces the floppy disk as the preferred form of low-capacity mobile data storage.
- In February 2003, Dell announced floppy drives would no longer be pre-installed on Dell Dimension home computers, although they were still available as a selectable option and purchasable as an aftermarket OEM add-on. On January 29, 2007, PC World stated that only 2% of the computers they sold contained built-in floppy disk drives; once present stocks were exhausted, no more standard floppies would be sold.
- During the decade, Windows 2000, XP, Microsoft Office 2003, Vista and Office 2007 (and later Windows 7) become the ubiquitous industry standards in personal computer software until the end of the decade, when Apple began to slowly gain market share. Windows ME and Microsoft Office XP were also released during the decade.
- With the advent of the Web 2.0, dynamic technology became widely accessible, and by the mid-2000s, PHP and MySQL became (with Apache and nginx) the backbone of many sites, making programming knowledge unnecessary to publish to the web. Blogs, portals, and wikis become common electronic dissemination methods for professionals, amateurs, and businesses to conduct knowledge management typified by success of the online encyclopedia Wikipedia which launched on January 15, 2001, grew rapidly and became the largest and most popular general reference work on the Internet as well as the best known wiki in the world and the largest encyclopedia in the world.
- Open-source software, such as the Linux operating system, the Mozilla Firefox web browser and VLC media player, gain ground.
- Internet commerce became standard for reservations; stock trading; promotion of music, arts, literature, and film; shopping; and other activities.
- During this decade certain websites and search engines became prominent worldwide as transmitters of goods, services and information. Some of the most popular and successful online sites or search engines of the 2000s included Google, Yahoo!, Wikipedia, Amazon, eBay, MySpace, Facebook, Twitter, and YouTube.
- More and more businesses began providing paperless services, clients accessing bills and bank statements directly through a web interface.
- In 2007, the fast food chain McDonald's announced the introduction of free high speed wireless internet access at most of its 1,200 restaurants by the end of the year in a move which will make it the UK's biggest provider of such a service.

==== Popular websites ====
Google, YouTube, Ask.com and Wikipedia emerged as popular websites, becoming the 2nd, 3rd, 7th and 9th most popular websites by the end of the decade respectively. Amazon overtook eBay as the most-visited e-commerce site in 2008. AOL significantly declined in popularity throughout the decade, falling from being the most popular website to no longer being within the top 10. Excite and Lycos fell outside the top 10, and MSN fell from the second to sixth most popular site, though it quadrupled its monthly visits (going from 325 to 1.2 billion monthly visits). Yahoo! maintained relatively stable popularity, remaining the most popular website for most of the decade.

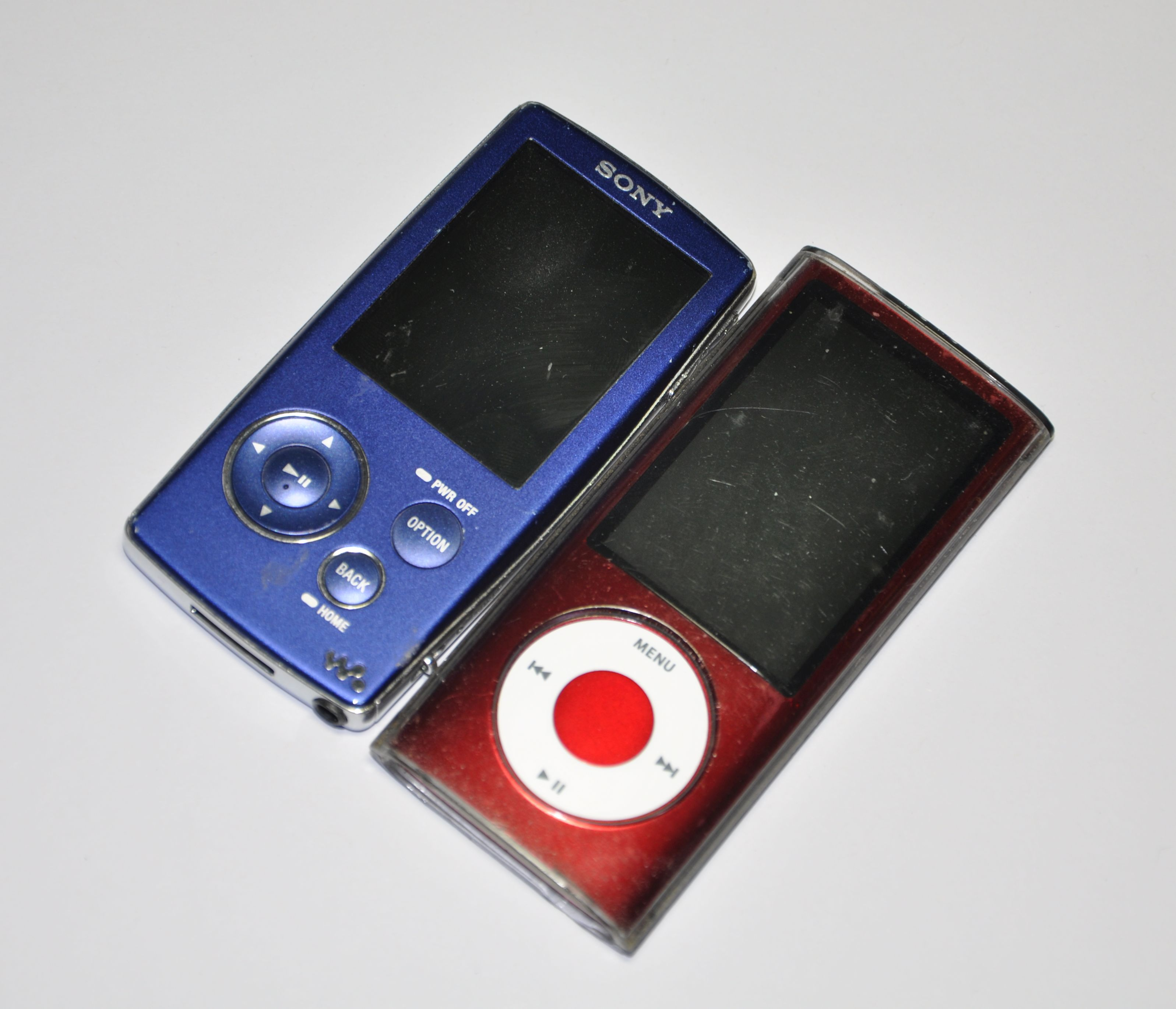
The rise of MP3 players, downloadable music, and cellular ringtones in the mid-2000s ended the decade-long dominance that the CD held up to that point.

==== Electronics ====
- GPS (Global Positioning System) became very popular especially in the tracking of items or people, and the use in cars (see Automotive navigation systems). Games that utilized the system, such as geocaching, emerged and became popular.
- Green laser pointers appeared on the market circa 2000, and are the most common type of DPSS lasers (also called DPSSFD for "diode pumped solid state frequency-doubled").

In late 2004 and early 2005, came a significant increase in reported incidents linked to laser pointers – see Lasers and aviation safety. The wave of incidents may have been triggered in part by "copycats" who read press accounts of laser pointer incidents. In one case, David Banach of New Jersey was charged under federal Patriot Act anti-terrorism laws, after he allegedly shone a laser pointer at aircraft.

- Chip and PIN is the brand name adopted by the banking industries in the United Kingdom and Ireland for the rollout of the EMV smart card payment system for credit, debit and ATM cards.

Chip and PIN was trialled in Northampton, England from May 2003, and as a result was rolled out nationwide in the United Kingdom in 2004 with advertisements in the press and national television touting the "Safety in Numbers" slogan.

- In 2009, Tesco (a British multinational grocery and general merchandise retailer) opened its first UK branch at which service robots were the only option at the checkout, in Kingsley, Northampton – its US chain, Fresh & Easy, already operates several branches like this.
- September 7, 2009, an EU watchdog warns of an "alarming increase" in cash machine fraud by organised criminal gangs across Europe using sophisticated skimming technology, together with an explosion in ram-raiding attacks on ATMs.

ATM crime in Europe jumped to €485m (£423m) in 2008 following a 149% rise in attacks on cash machines. Gangs are turning to Bluetooth wireless technology to transmit card and personal identification number (PIN) details to nearby laptops and using increasingly sophisticated techniques to skim cards.

Portable laptops became popular during the late 2000s.

More conventional smash-and-grab attacks are also on the rise, says Enisa, the European Network and Information Security Agency. It reports a 32% rise in physical robberies on ATMs, ranging from ram raids to the use of rotary saws, blowtorches and diamond drills. It blames the increase on criminal gangs from eastern Europe.

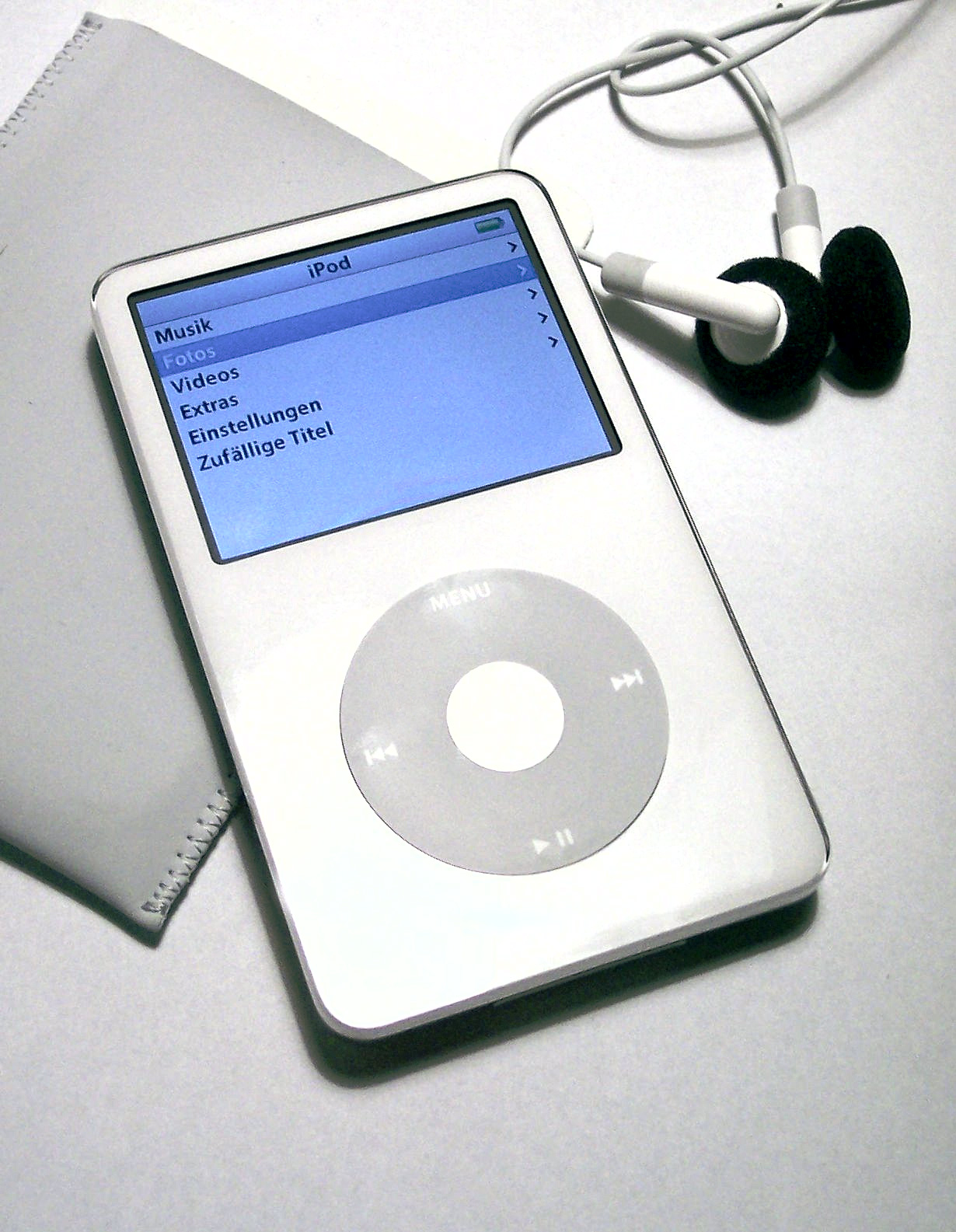
Digital audio players, especially the iPod, gained massive popularity during the decade

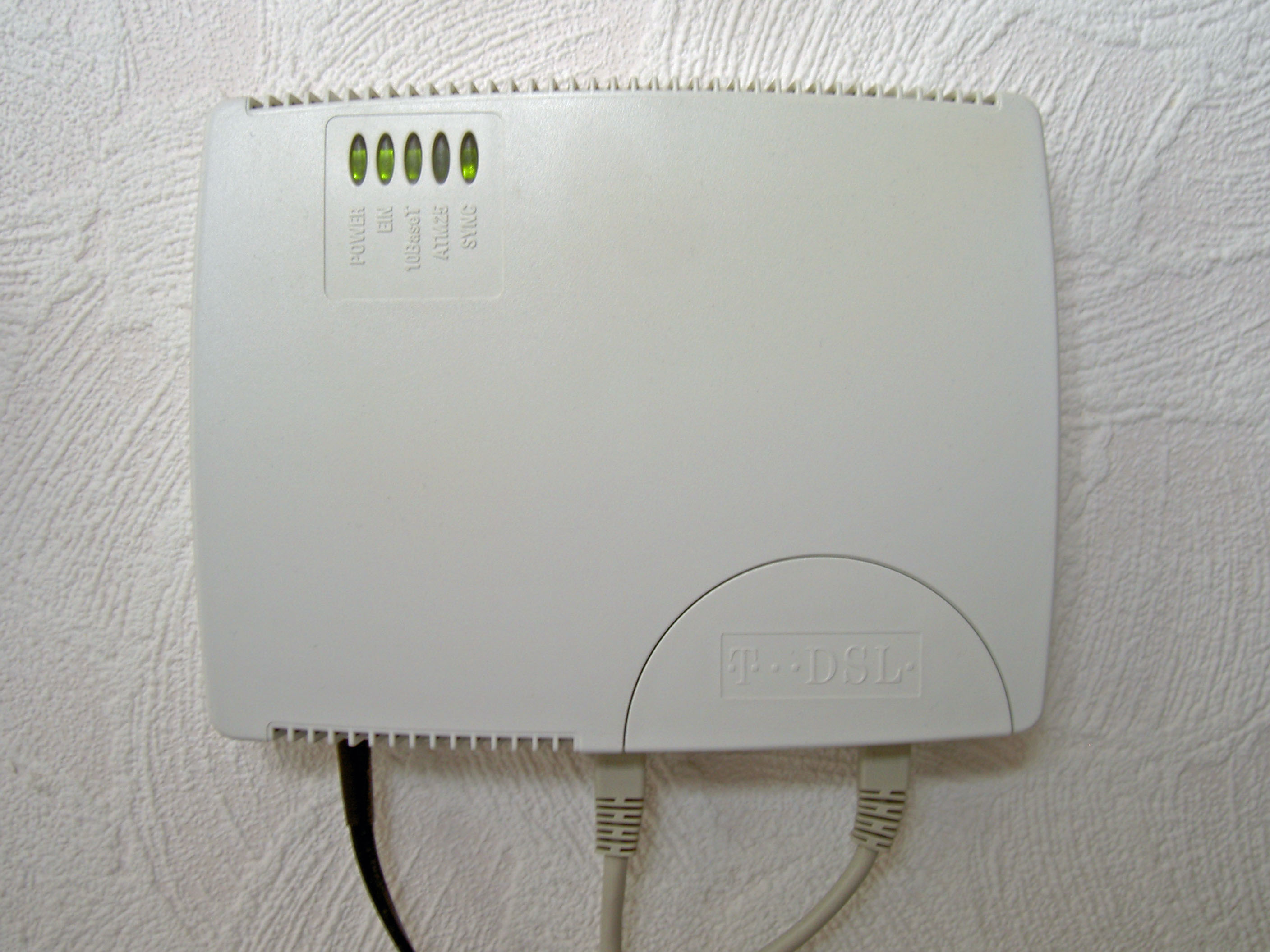
A DSL modem from the 2000s. During the decade broadband Internet connection gained massive popularity around the world and gradually replaced internet connection via telephone lines.

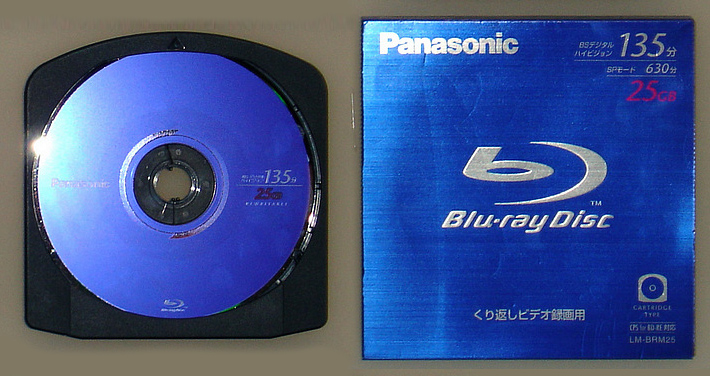
During the decade the Blu-ray format became dominant successor of to the DVD format

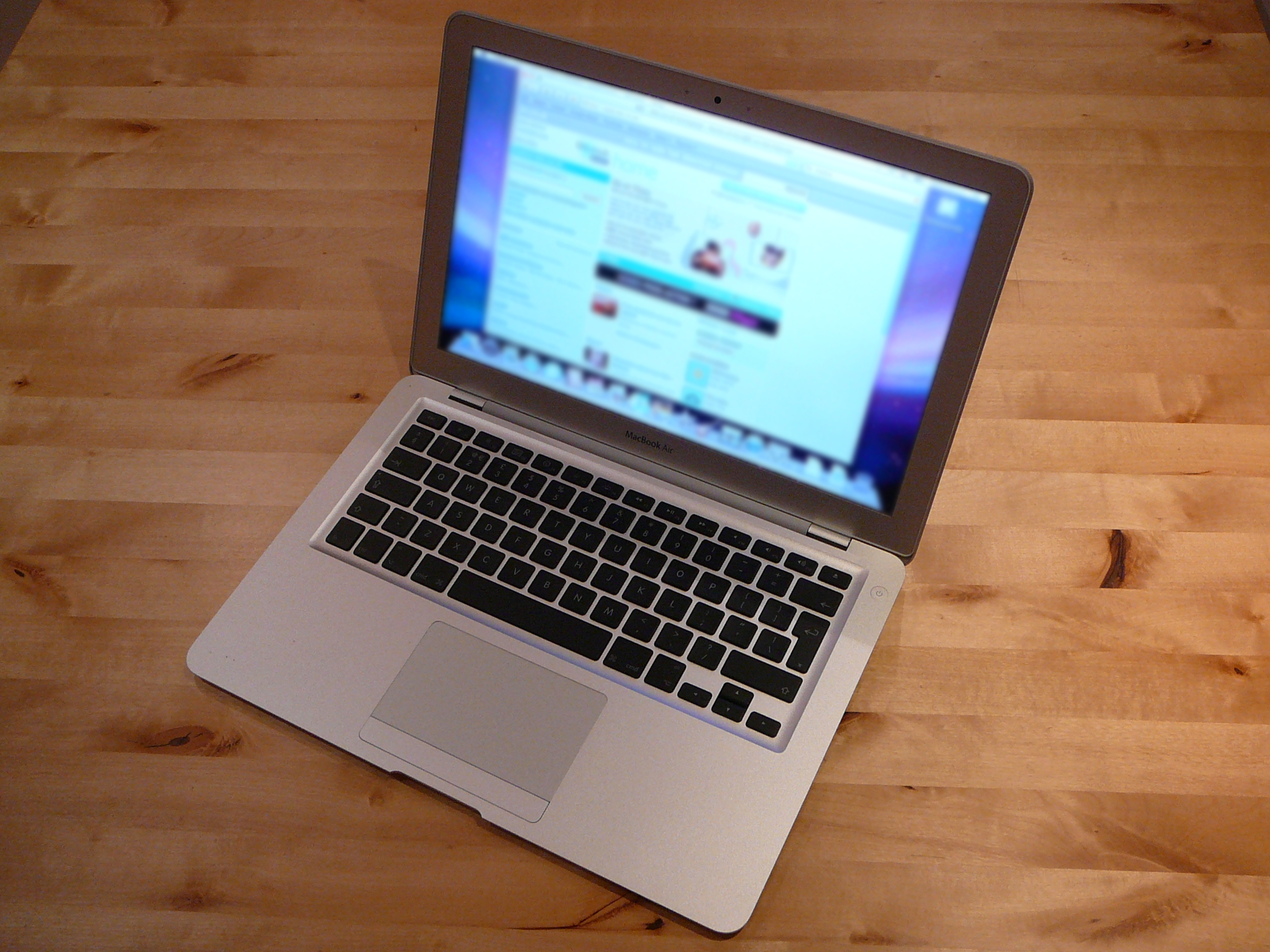
The MacBook Air also saw popularity in the late 2000s

==== Robotics ====
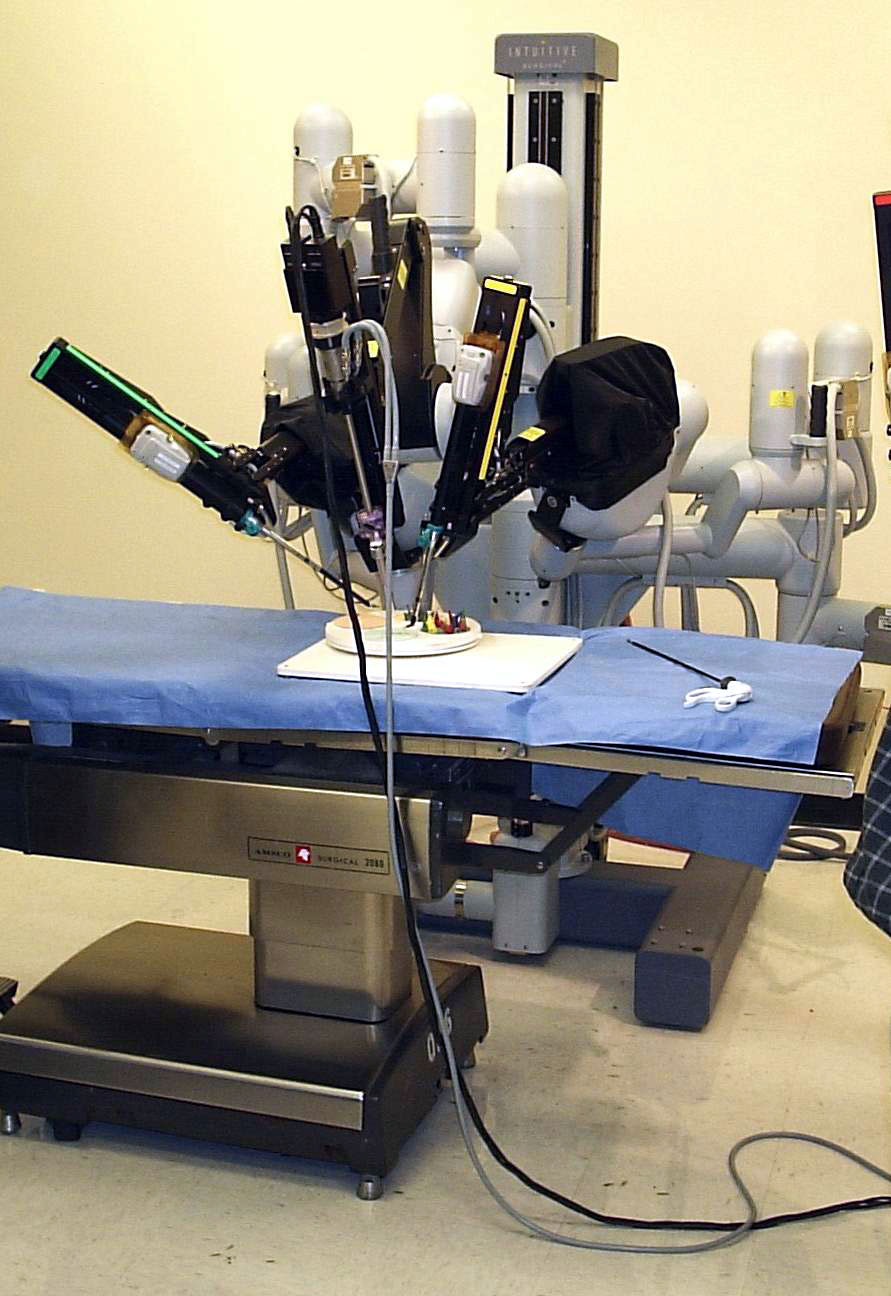
The Da Vinci surgical robot which enables doing accurate robotic surgeries was introduced in the 2000s

- The U.S. Army used increasingly effective unmanned aerial vehicles in war zones, such as Afghanistan.
- Emerging use of robotics, especially telerobotics in medicine, particularly for surgery.
- Home automation and home robotics advance in North America; iRobot's "Roomba" is the most successful domestic robot and has sold 1.5 million units.

==== Transportation ====
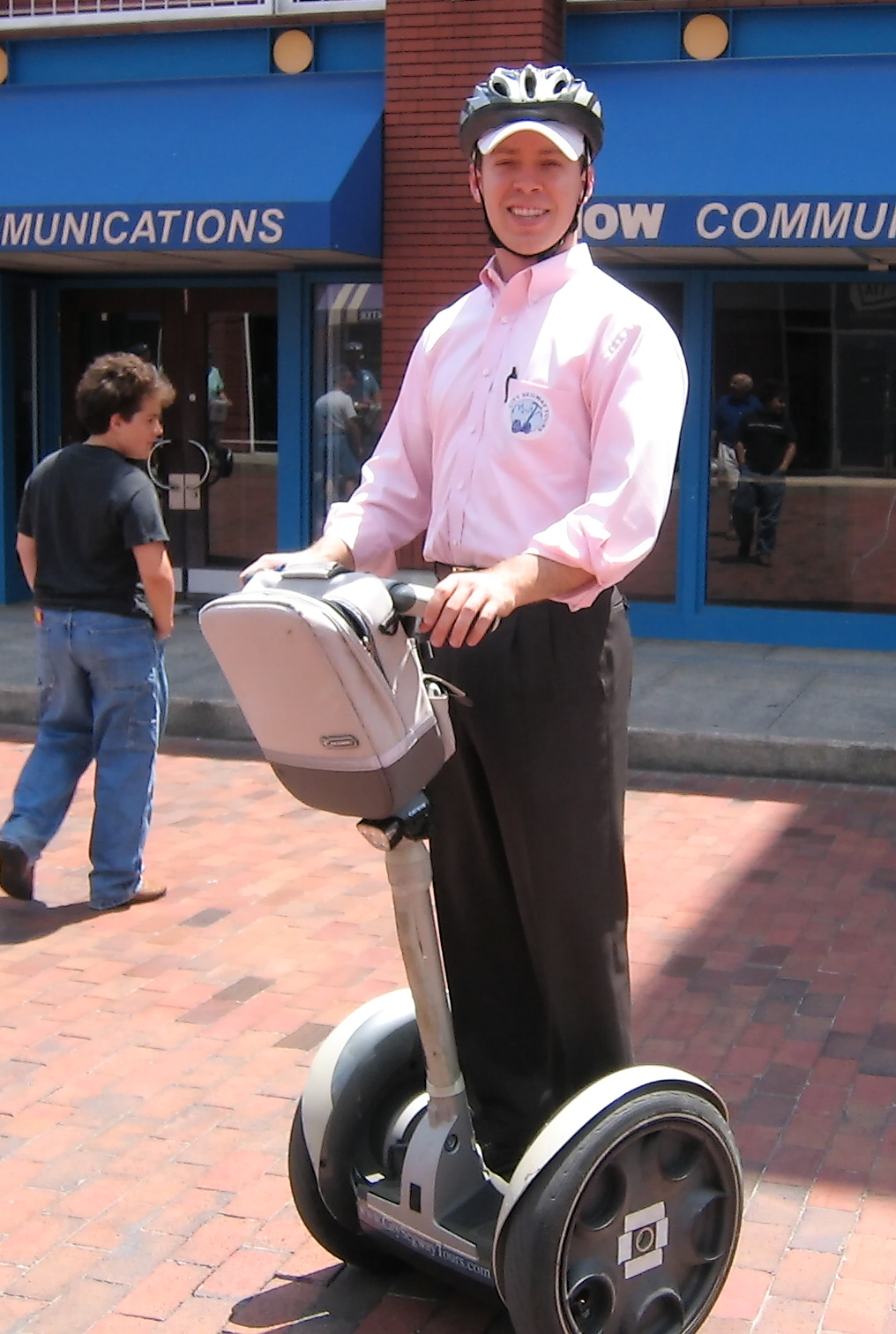
The Segway was unveiled in December 2001

- Competition between Airbus and Boeing, the two largest remaining airliner manufacturers, intensified, with pan-European Airbus outselling American Boeing for the first time during this decade.
  - Airbus launched the double-decker Airbus A380, the largest passenger aircraft ever to enter production.
  - The Boeing 787 Dreamliner, the first mass-production aircraft manufactured primarily with composite materials, had its maiden flight.
  - Production of the Boeing 757, Boeing's largest single-aisle airliner, ended with no replacement.
- The Concorde, a turbojet-powered supersonic passenger airliner or supersonic transport (SST), was retired in 2003 due to a general downturn in the aviation industry after the type's only crash in 2000, the 9/11 terrorist attacks in 2001 and a decision by Airbus, the successor firm of Aerospatiale and BAC, to discontinue maintenance support.
- December 9, 2005 – The London Transport Executive AEC Routemaster double-decker bus was officially withdrawn from 51 years general service in the UK. In the 2008 London mayoral election campaign, prospective mayor Boris Johnson made several commitments to change the London Buses vehicle policy, namely to introduce a new Routemaster, and remove the bendy buses.
- High-speed rail projects opened across Asia and Europe, and rail services saw record passenger numbers.
  - The Acela Express, the first full high-speed service in North America, started on the Northeast Corridor in 2000.
  - The Qinhuangdao–Shenyang High-Speed Railway opened, becoming the first high-speed railway in China.
  - High Speed 1, the first true high-speed line in the United Kingdom, opened in stages between 2003 and 2007, cutting travel times between Paris, Brussels and London considerably.
  - Taiwan High Speed Rail opened in 2007, connecting cities down the island's west coast.
  - HSL-Zuid opened in 2009, linking Amsterdam to the European high-speed network for the first time.

==== Video ====
- Digital cameras become widely popular due to rapid decreases in size and cost while photo resolution steadily increases. As a result, the digital cameras largely supplanted the analog cameras and the integration into mobile phones increase greatly. Since 2007, digital cameras started being manufactured with the face recognition feature built in.
- Flat panel displays started becoming widely popular in the second half of the decade displacing cathode-ray tubes.
- Handheld projectors enter the market and are then integrated into cellphones.
- DVR devices such as TiVo became popular, making it possible to record television broadcasts to a hard drive-based digital storage medium and allowing many additional features including the option to fast-forward through commercials or to use an automatic Commercial skipping feature. This feature created controversy, with major television networks and movie studios claiming it violates copyright and should be banned. With the commercial skipping feature, many television channels place advertisements on the bottom on the TV screen.
- VOD technology became widely available among cable users worldwide, enabling the users to select and watch video content from a large variety of available content stored on a central server, as well as gaining the possibility to freeze the image, as well as fast-forward and rewind the VOD content.
- DVDs, and subsequently Blu-ray Discs, replace VCR technology as the common standard in homes and at video stores.
- Free Internet video portals like YouTube, Hulu, and Internet TV software solutions like Joost became new popular alternatives to TV broadcasts.
- In March 2007, Verizon Wireless launched V CAST Mobile TV, which delivered television broadcasts, including full-length comedy, sports and news programming, to mobile phones.
- "High-definition television" becomes very popular towards the second half of the decade, with the increase of HD television channels and the conversion from analog to digital signals.
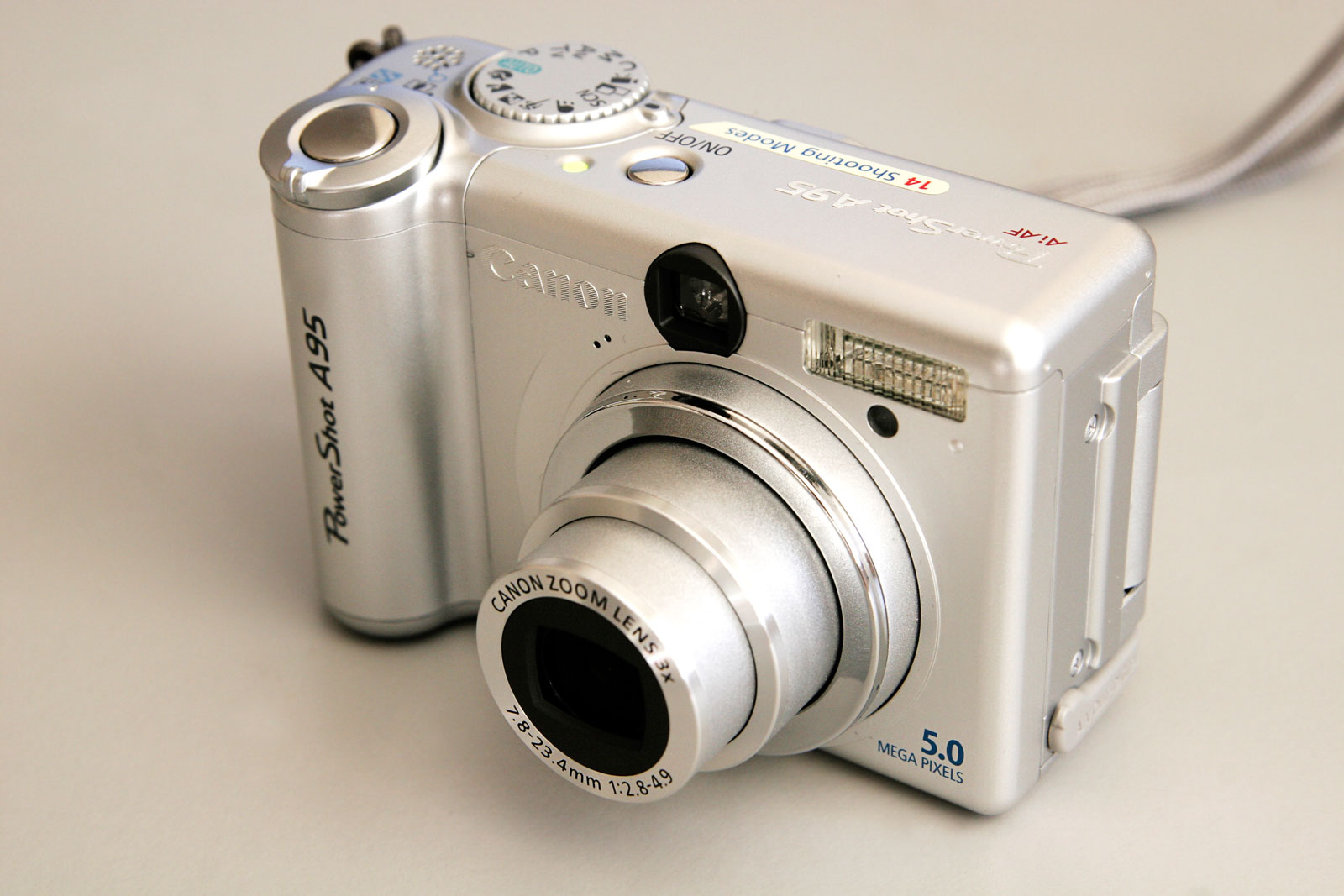
Digital cameras gained massive popularity during the decade

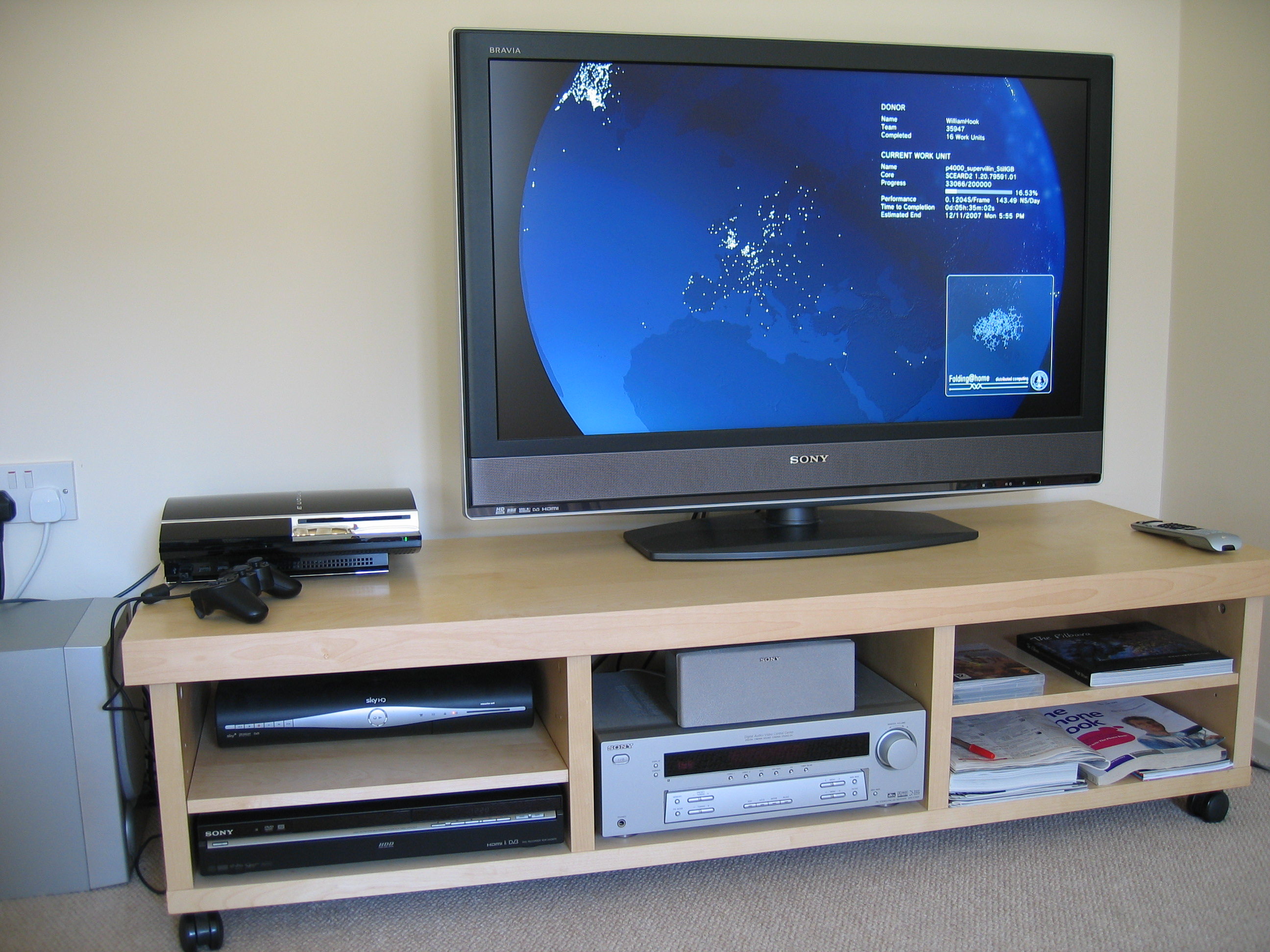
Flat panel displays begin to displace cathode ray tubes

==== Miscellaneous ====
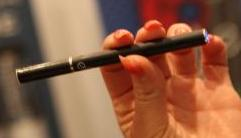
In 2003, the vape was invented by Chinese pharmacist, Hon Lik

- The vape was invented in 2003 by Chinese pharmacist, Hon Lik.

== Religion and irreligion ==
Prominent events and trends during the 2000s:

- Increasing Islamophobia and Islamophobic incidents during the 2000s associated with the September 11 attacks or with the increased presence of Muslims in the Western world.
- In 2000, the Italian Supreme Court ruled that Scientology is a religion for legal purposes.
- In 2001, lawsuits were filed in the United States and Ireland, alleging that some priests had sexually abused minors and that their superiors had conspired to conceal and otherwise abet their criminal misconduct. In 2004, the John Jay report tabulated a total of 4,392 priests and deacons in the U.S. against whom allegations of sexual abuse had been made.
- The French law on secularity and conspicuous religious symbols in schools bans wearing conspicuous religious symbols in French public (i.e. government-operated) primary and secondary schools; and came into effect on September 2, 2004.
- June 27, 2005, – The Supreme Court of the United States ruled on in a 5–4 decision, that a Ten Commandments display at the McCreary County courthouse in Whitley City, Kentucky and a Ten Commandments display at the Pulaski County courthouse—were unconstitutional: McCreary County v. American Civil Liberties Union
- France created in 2006 the first French parliamentary commission on cult activities which led to a report registering a number of cults considered as dangerous. Supporters of such movements have criticized the report on the grounds of the respect of religious freedom. Proponents of the measure contend that only dangerous cults have been listed as such, and state secularism ensures religious freedom in France.
- November 2009 – Minaret controversy in Switzerland: A referendum, a constitutional amendment banning the construction of new Mosque minarets was approved, sparking reactions from governments and political parties throughout of the world.
- 2009 – In Pope Benedict XVI's third encyclical Caritas in Veritate, he warns that a purely technocrat mindset where decisions are made only on grounds of efficiency will not deliver true development. Technical decisions must not be divorced from ethics. Benedict discusses bioethics and states that practices such as abortion, eugenics and euthanasia are morally hazardous and that accepting them can lead to greater tolerance for various forms of moral degradation. He turns to another consequence of the technocratic mindset, the viewing of people's personalities in purely psychological terms at the exclusion of the spiritual, which he says can lead to people feeling empty and abandoned even in prosperous societies.

== Population and social issues ==
- The decade saw further expansion of LGBTQ+ rights, with many European, Oceanic, and American countries recognizing civil unions and partnerships and a number of countries extending civil marriage to same-sex couples. The Netherlands was the first country in the world to legalize same-sex marriage in 2001. By the end of 2009, same-sex marriage was legal and performed in 10 countries worldwide, although only in some jurisdictions in Mexico and the United States. In 2009, Jóhanna Sigurðardóttir, an Icelandic politician, becomes the first openly LGBTQ head of government in the world.
- Population continued to grow in most countries, in particular in developing countries, though overall the rate slowed. According to United Nations estimates, world population reached six billion in late 1999, and continued to climb to 6.8 billion in late 2009. In 2007 the population of the United States reached 300 million inhabitants, and Japan's population peaked at 127 million before going into decline.
- Obesity is a leading preventable cause of death worldwide, with increasing prevalence in adults and children, and authorities view it as one of the most serious public health problems of the 21st century.
- In 2001, 46.4% of people in sub-Saharan Africa were living in extreme poverty. Nearly half of all Indian children are undernourished, however, even among the wealthiest fifth one third of children are malnourished.
- 5 A Day is the name of a number of programs in countries such as the United States, the United Kingdom and Germany, to encourage the consumption of at least five portions of fruit and vegetables each day, following a recommendation by the World Health Organization that individuals consume at least 400 g of vegetables daily.
- The programme was introduced by the UK Department of Health in the winter of 2002–2003, and received some adverse media attention because of the high and rising costs of fresh fruit and vegetables. After ten years, research suggested that few people were meeting the target.
- The London congestion charge is a fee charged on most motor vehicles operating within the Congestion Charge Zone (CCZ) in central London between 07:00 and 18:00 Monday to Friday. It is not charged at weekends, public holidays or between Christmas Day and New Year's Day (inclusive). The charge, which was introduced on February 17, 2003, remains one of the largest congestion charge zones in the world.
- On December 3, 2003, New Zealand passed legislation to progressively implement a smoking ban in schools, school grounds, and workplaces by December 2004. On March 29, 2004, Ireland implemented a nationwide ban on smoking in all workplaces. In Norway, similar legislation was put into force on June 1 the same year. Smoking was banned in all public places in the whole of the United Kingdom in 2007, when England became the final region to have the legislation come into effect (the age limit for buying tobacco was also raised from 16 to 18 on October 1, 2007). From 2004 to 2009, the UK's Merseyside police officers, conducted 1,389 section 60 stop and searches (without reasonable suspicion), rising to 23,138 within five years.
- In 2005 the cost of alcohol dependence and abuse was estimated to cost the US economy approximately 220 billion dollars per year, more than cancer and obesity.
- The number of antidepressants prescribed by the NHS in the United Kingdom almost doubled during one decade, authorities reported in 2010. In 2009, 39.1 million prescriptions for drugs to tackle depression were issued in England, compared with 20.1 million issued in 1999.
- In the United States a 2005 independent report stated that 11% of women and 5% of men in the non-institutionalized population (2002) take antidepressants. The use of antidepressants in the United States doubled over one decade, from 1996 to 2005.
- Antidepressant drugs were prescribed to 13 million in 1996 and to 27 million people by 2005. In 2008, more than 164 million prescriptions were written.
- In the UK, the number of weddings in 2006 was the lowest for 110 years.
- Jamie Oliver, is a British chef, restaurateur, media personality, known for his food-focused television shows and cookbooks. In 2006, Oliver began a formal campaign to ban unhealthy food in British schools and to get children eating nutritious food instead. Oliver's efforts to bring radical change to the school meals system, chronicled in the series Jamie's School Dinners, challenged the junk-food culture by showing schools they could serve healthy, cost-efficient meals that kids enjoyed eating. Jamie's efforts brought the subject of school dinners to the political forefront and changed the types of food served in schools.
- In 2006, nearly 11 million Plastic surgery procedures were performed in the United States alone. The number of cosmetic procedures performed in the United States has increased over 50 percent since the start of the century.
- In November 2006, the Office of Communications (Ofcom) announced that it would ban television advertisements for junk food before, during and after television programming aimed at under-16s in the United Kingdom. These regulations were originally outlined in a proposal earlier in the year. This move has been criticized on both ends of the scale; while the Food and Drink Federation labelled the ban "over the top", others have said the restrictions do not go far enough (particularly due to the fact that soap operas would be exempt from the ban). On April 1, 2007, junk food advertisements were banned from programmes aimed at four to nine-year-olds. Such advertisements broadcast during programmes "aimed at, or which would appeal to," ten to fifteen-year-olds will continue to be phased out over the coming months, with a full ban coming into effect on January 1, 2009.
- November 10, 2006 – referring to the UK's annual poppy appeal, British journalist and presenter Jon Snow condemned the attitude of those who insist remembrance poppies are worn. He claimed: there is a rather unpleasant breed of poppy fascism out there.
- In January 2007, the British Retail Consortium announced that major UK retailers, including Asda, Boots, Co-op, Iceland, Marks and Spencer, Sainsbury's, Tesco and Waitrose intended to cease adding trans fatty acids to their own products by the end of 2007.
- In October 2008 AFP reported on the further expansion of killings of albinos to the Ruyigi region of Burundi. Body parts of the victims are then smuggled to Tanzania, where they are used for witch doctor rituals and potions. Albinos have become "a commercial good", commented Nicodeme Gahimbare in Ruyigi, who established a local safe haven in his fortified house.
- A 2009 study found a 30% increase in Chinese diabetes over 7 years.
- AIDS continued to expand during the decade, mainly in Sub-Saharan Africa. New diseases of animal origin appeared for a short time, such as the bird flu in 2007. Swine flu was declared a pandemic by the World Health Organization in 2009.

== Environment and climate change ==
Climate change and global warming became household words in the 2000s. Predictions tools made significant progress during the decade, UN-sponsored organisations such as the IPCC gained influence, and studies such as the Stern report influenced public support for paying the political and economic costs of countering climate change.

The global temperature kept climbing during the decade. In December 2009, the World Meteorological Organization (WMO) announced that the 2000s might have been the warmest decade since records began in 1850, with four of the five warmest years since 1850 having occurred in this decade. The NASA and the NOAA later echoed the WMO's findings.

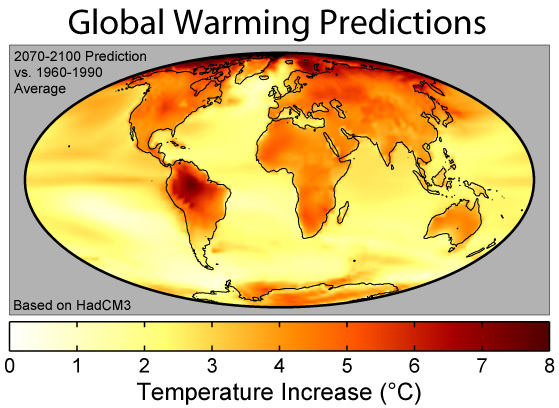
Scientific studies on climate helped establish a consensus.

Major natural disasters became more frequent and helped change public opinion. One of the deadliest heat waves in human history happened during the 2000s, mostly in Europe, with the 2003 European heat wave killing 37,451 people over the summer months. In February 2009, a series of highly destructive bushfires started in Victoria, Australia, lasting into the next month. While the fires are believed to have been caused by arson, they were widely reported as having been fueled by an excessive heatwave that was due in part to climate change. It has also been alleged that climate change was a cause of increased storms intensity, notably in the case of Hurricane Katrina.

=== International actions ===
Climate change became a major issue for governments, populations and scientists. Debates on global warming and its causes made significant progress, as climate change denials were refuted by most scientific studies. Decisive reports such as the Stern Review and the 2007 IPCC Report almost established a climate change consensus. NGOs' actions and the commitment of political personalities (such as former U.S. vice president Al Gore) also urged to international reactions against climate change. Documentary films An Inconvenient Truth and Home may have had a decisive impact.

Under the auspices of The UN Convention on Climate Change the Kyoto Protocol (aimed at combating global warming) entered into force on February 16, 2005. As of November 2009, 187 states have signed and ratified the protocol. In addition The UN Convention on Climate Change helped coordinate the efforts of the international community to fight potentially disastrous effects of human activity on the planet and launched negotiations to set an ambitious program of carbon emission reduction that began in 2007 with the Bali Road Map. However, the representatives of the then 192 member countries of the United Nations gathered in December 2009 for the Copenhagen Conference failed to reach a binding agreement to reduce carbon emissions because of divisions between regional areas.

However, as environmental technologies were to make up a potential market, some countries made large investments in renewable energies, energy conservation and sustainable transport. Many governments launched national plans to promote sustainable energy. In 2003, the European Union members created an emission trading scheme, and in 2007 they assembled a climate and energy package to reduce further their carbon emission and improve their energy-efficiency. In 2009, the United States Obama administration set up the Green New Deal, a plan to create millions of jobs in sectors related to environmentalism.

The Household Waste Recycling Act 2003 requires local authorities in England to provide every household with a separate collection of at least two types of recyclable materials by 2010.

== Culture ==
=== Architecture ===
Commercialization and globalization resulted in mass migration of people from rural areas to urban areas resulting in high-profile skyscrapers in Asia and Europe. In Asia skyscrapers were constructed in India, China, Thailand, South Korea, and Japan.

- The Millennium Bridge, London officially known as the London Millennium Footbridge, is a steel suspension bridge for pedestrians crossing the River Thames in London, England, linking Bankside with the city. Londoners nicknamed the bridge the "Wobbly Bridge" after participants in a charity walk on behalf of Save the Children to open the bridge felt an unexpected, and, for some, uncomfortable, swaying motion on the first two days after the bridge opened. The bridge was closed later that day, and after two days of limited access the bridge was closed for almost two years while modifications were made to eliminate the wobble entirely. It was reopened in 2002.
- 30 St Mary Axe (informally also known as "the Gherkin" and previously the Swiss Re Building) is a skyscraper in London's financial district, the City of London, completed in December 2003 and opened at the end of May 2004. The building has become an iconic symbol of London and is one of the city's most widely recognised examples of modern architecture.
- Wembley Stadium is a football stadium located in Wembley Park, in the Borough of Brent, London, England. It opened in 2007 and was built on the site of the previous 1923 Wembley Stadium. The earlier Wembley stadium, originally called the Empire Stadium, was often referred to as "The Twin Towers" and was one of the world's most famous football stadia until its demolition in 2003.
- A major redevelopment of London's Trafalgar Square led by WS Atkins with Foster and Partners as sub-consultants was completed in 2003. The work involved closing the main eastbound road along the north side, diverting the traffic around the other three sides of the square, demolishing the central section of the northern retaining wall and inserting a wide set of steps leading up to a pedestrianised terrace in front of the National Gallery. The construction includes two lifts for disabled access, public toilets, and a small café. Previously, access between the square and the Gallery was by two crossings at the northeast and northwest corners of the square.
- Taipei 101 became the tallest building in the world ever built after it officially opened on December 31, 2004, a record it held until the opening of the Burj Khalifa (Formerly known as Burj Dubai) in January 2010, standing at 828 m (2,717 ft).

=== Fine arts ===
- Lucian Freud was a German-born British painter. Known chiefly for his thickly impastoed portrait and figure paintings, he was widely considered the pre-eminent British artist of his time.
  - During a period from May 2000 to December 2001, Freud painted Queen Elizabeth II. There was criticism of this portrayal of the queen in some sections of the British media. The highest-selling tabloid newspaper, The Sun, was particularly condemnatory, describing the portrait as "a travesty".
- The Hockney–Falco thesis is a controversial theory of art history, advanced by artist David Hockney and physicist Charles M. Falco, suggesting that advances in realism and accuracy in the history of Western art since the Renaissance were primarily the result of optical aids such as the camera obscura, camera lucida, and curved mirrors, rather than solely due to the development of artistic technique and skill. In a 2001 book, Secret Knowledge: Rediscovering the Lost Techniques of the Old Masters, Hockney analyzed the work of the Old Masters and argued that the level of accuracy represented in their work is impossible to create by "eyeballing it". Since then, Hockney and Falco have produced a number of publications on positive evidence of the use of optical aids, and the historical plausibility of such methods.
- Rolf Harris was an Australian entertainer. He was a musician, a singer-songwriter, a composer, a painter, and a television personality.
  - In 2005 he painted an official portrait of Queen Elizabeth II, which was the subject of a special episode of Rolf on Art.
  - Harris's portrait of the queen was voted by readers of the Radio Times the third favourite portrait of her. The royal portrait was exhibited at Buckingham Palace, the Palace of Holyroodhouse in Edinburgh, and was exhibited on a tour of public galleries in the UK.
- In April–June 2003, the English visual artists often known as The Chapman Brothers, held a solo show at Modern Art Oxford entitled The Rape of Creativity in which "the enfants terribles of Britart, bought a mint collection of Goya's most celebrated prints – and set about systematically defacing them". The Francisco Goya prints referred to his Disasters of War set of 80 etchings. The duo named their newly defaced works Insult to Injury. BBC described more of the exhibition's art: "Drawings of mutant Ronald McDonalds, a bronze sculpture of a painting showing a sad-faced Hitler in clown make-up and a major installation featuring a knackered old caravan and fake dog turds." The Daily Telegraph commented that the Chapman brothers had "managed to raise the hackles of art historians by violating something much more sacred to the art world than the human body – another work of art"
  - As a protest against this piece, Aaron Barschak (who later gate-crashed Prince William's 21st birthday party dressed as Osama bin Laden in a frock) threw a pot of red paint over Jake Chapman during a talk he was giving in May 2003.
- On May 5, 2004, a 1905 painting titled Garçon à la Pipe (English: Boy with a Pipe) by Pablo Picasso was sold for US$104,168,000 at Sotheby's auction in New York City. At the time, it broke the record for the amount paid for an auctioned painting (when inflation is ignored). The amount, US$104 million, includes the auction price of US$93 million plus the auction house's commission of about US$11 million. Many art critics have stated that the painting's high sale price has much more to do with the artist's name than with the merit or historical importance of the painting. The Washington Post's article on the sale contained the following characterisation of the reaction:
  Picasso expert Pepe Karmel, reached in New York the morning after the sale, was waxing wroth about the whole affair. "I'm stunned," he said, "that a pleasant, minor painting could command a price appropriate to a real masterwork by Picasso. This just shows how much the marketplace is divorced from the true values of art."
- On May 24, 2004, more than 100 artworks from the famous collection of art collector and sponsor of the Young British Artists (YBAs) Charles Saatchi's were destroyed in a warehouse fire on an industrial estate in Leyton, east London. Modern art classics such as Tracey Emin's tent and works by Damien Hirst, Sarah Lucas and Gary Hume were lost.
  - Works by Patrick Caulfield, Craigie Horsfield and 20 pieces by Martin Maloney were also destroyed. They represent some of the cream of the so-named "Britart" movement of celebrated modern artists.
- In 2004, during Channel 5 (UK)'s 'Big Art Challenge' television program, despite declaring: "I hold video and photography in profound contempt." English art critic Brian Sewell, noted for artistic conservatism and having been described as "Britain's most famous and controversial art critic", went on to at least 3 times hail video artist (and ultimately the competition's winner) Chris Boyd (aged 21) a "genius".
- In June 2007, the English artist, entrepreneur and art collector Damien Hirst gained the European record for the most expensive work of art by a living artist, when his Lullaby Spring, (a 3-metre-wide steel cabinet with 6,136 pills) sold for 19.2 million dollars.
  - In September 2008, Damien Hirst took an unprecedented move for a living artist by selling a complete show, Beautiful Inside My Head Forever, at Sotheby's by auction and by-passing his long-standing galleries. The auction exceeded all predictions, raising £111 million ($198 million), breaking the record for a one-artist auction.
- December 9, 2009 – when the most expensive drawing by an Old Master ever, was sold in an auction. Titled 'Head of a Muse' by Raphael; costing £29,200,000 ($47,788,400), at Christie's, London, UK.

=== Literature ===
- Carol Ann Duffy, CBE, FRSL (born December 23, 1955) is a British poet and playwright. She is Professor of Contemporary Poetry at Manchester Metropolitan University, and was appointed Britain's poet laureate in May 2009. She is the first woman, the first Scot, and the first openly LGBT person to hold the position.
- The phenomenally successful Harry Potter series by J. K. Rowling is concluded in July 2007 (having been first published in 1997), although the film franchise continues until 2011; several spin-off productions are announced in the early 2010s. The Harry Potter series is to date the best-selling book series in world history, with only seven main volumes (and three supplemental works) published and four hundred and fifty million copies sold. The film franchise is also currently the third highest-grossing film franchise in history, with eight films (all but the final two of which were released in the 2000s) and $8,539,253,704 in sales.

== Popular culture ==
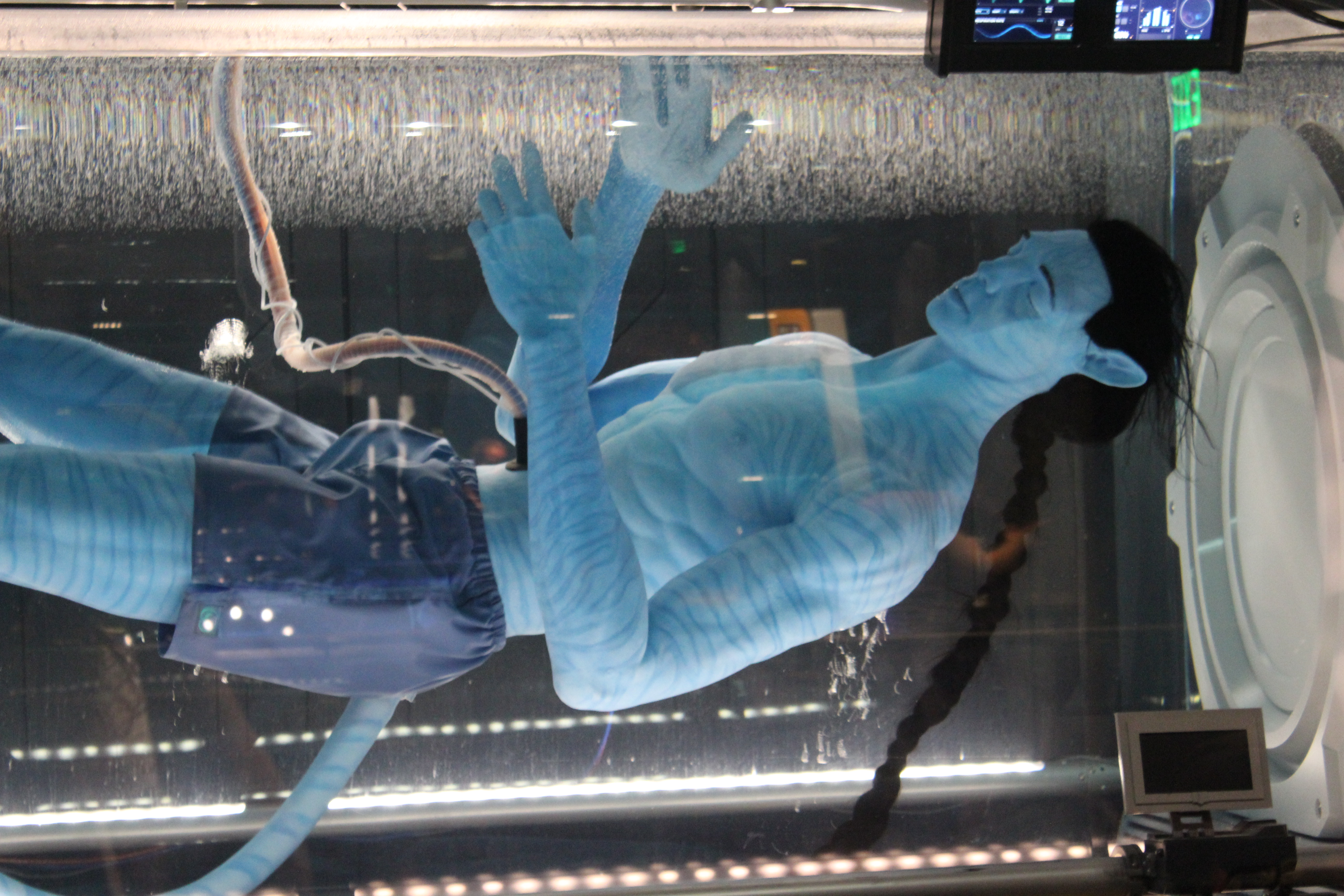
Popular films of the decade included Avatar, The Lord of the Rings: The Return of the King,Harry Potter and the Philosopher's Stone, Spider-Man, The Dark Knight, Gladiator, Pirates of the Caribbean: The Curse of the Black Pearl, and Transformers, many of which became critical and commercial landmarks of the decade.

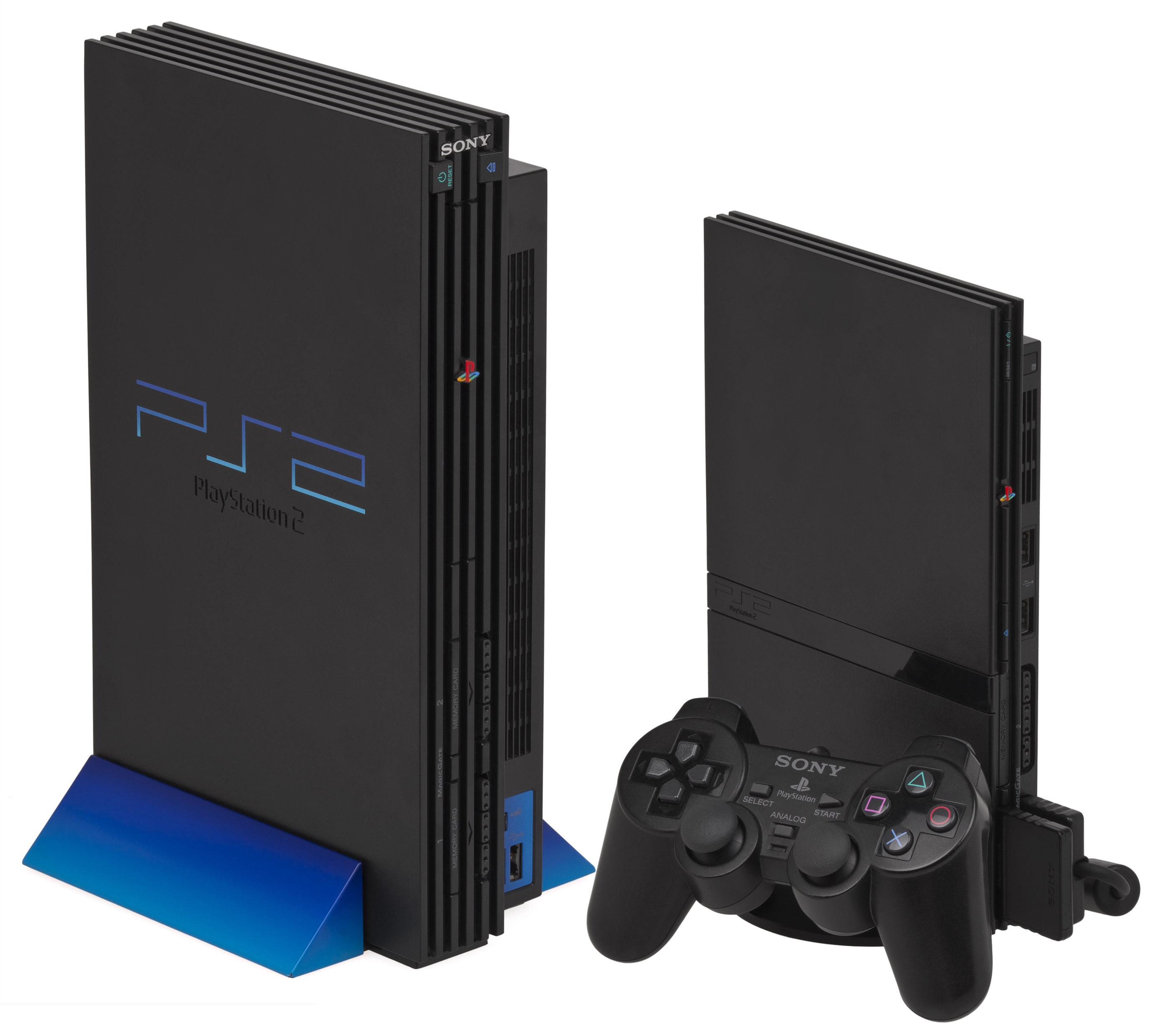
The sixth and seventh generation of video game consoles like PlayStation 2 (pictured), Xbox, GameCube, and Wii were a hit in the 2000s. Popular video games such as Grand Theft Auto: San Andreas, Tony Hawk's Pro Skater 3, Super Smash Bros. Melee, Super Mario Galaxy, The Legend of Zelda: Twilight Princess, and Mario Kart: Double Dash.

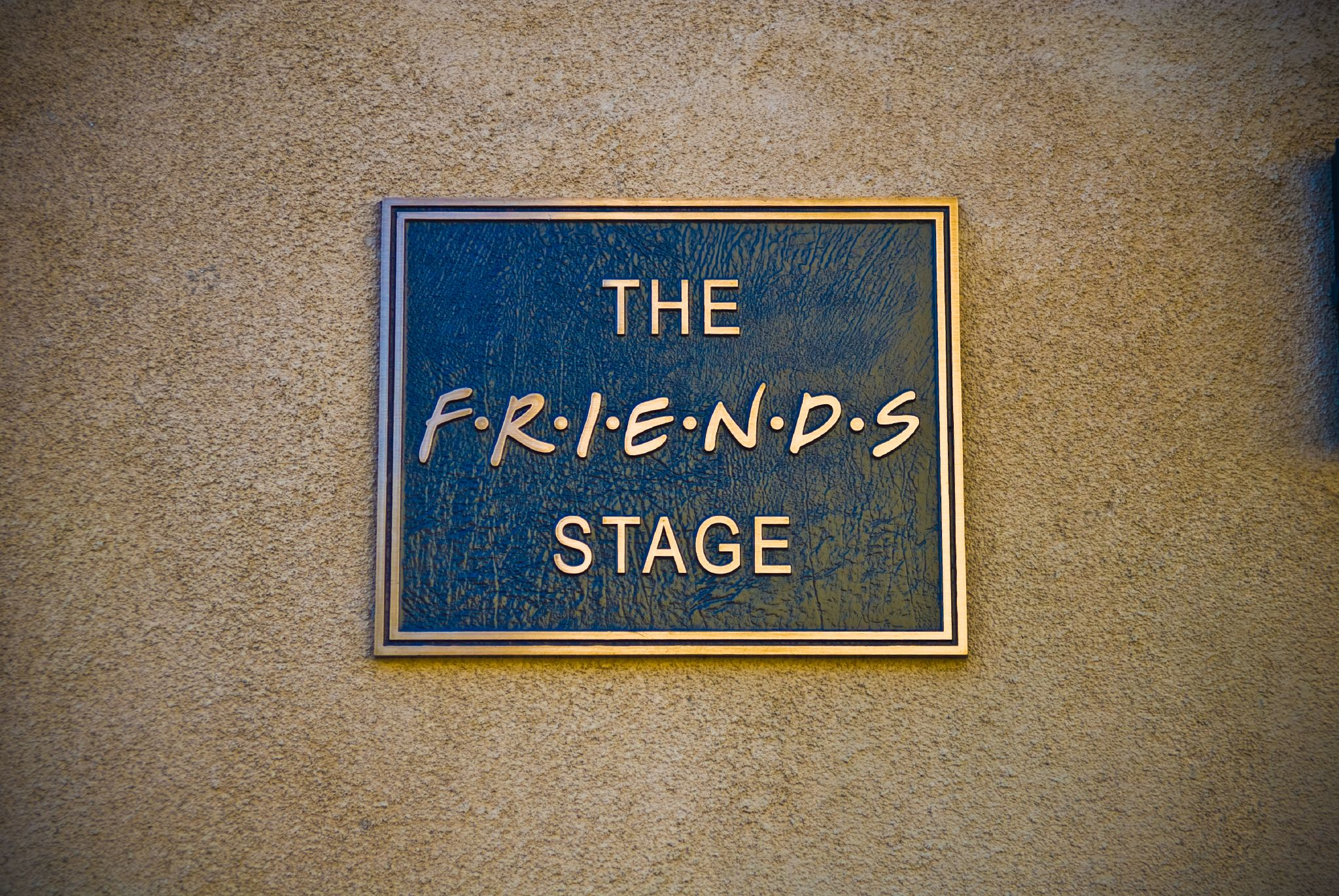
Stage 24 at Warner Bros. studio, named after the television show Friends. The final episode of Friends aired in 2004 with over 52 million viewers in the United States, and the character of Joey remained on television in his own spin-off until 2006.

The Sopranos and Curb Your Enthusiasm were popular on HBO. TV shows of varying genres such as Breaking Bad, The Office, Gilmore Girls, Sex and the City, The Wire, CSI: Crime Scene Investigation, Scrubs, Two and a Half Men, Grey's Anatomy, Six Feet Under, and Arrested Development were popular in the 2000s.

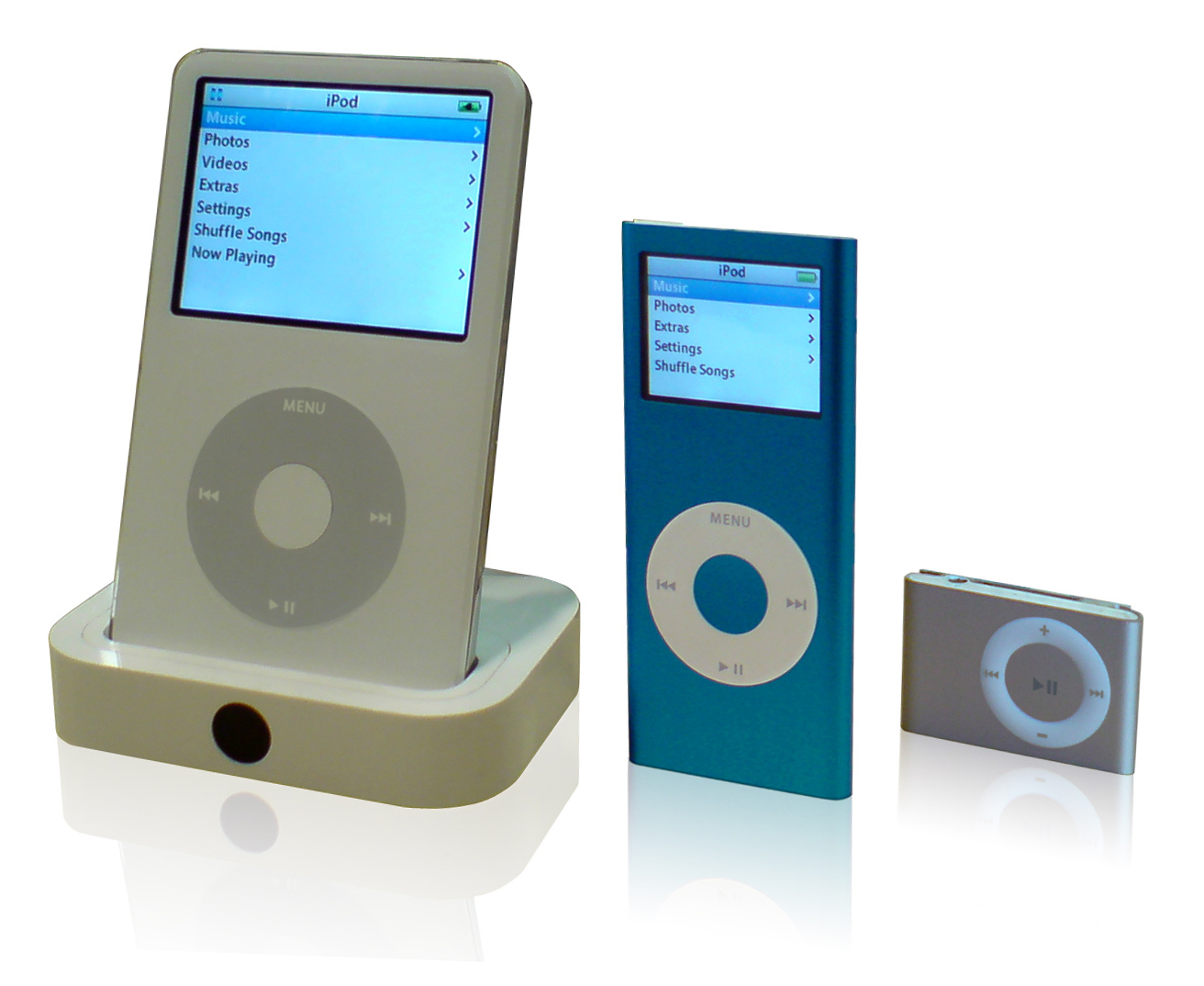
The iPod became a hit in the 2000s. iPods were digital music players that had click wheels and stored songs, the first iteration releasing in 2001.

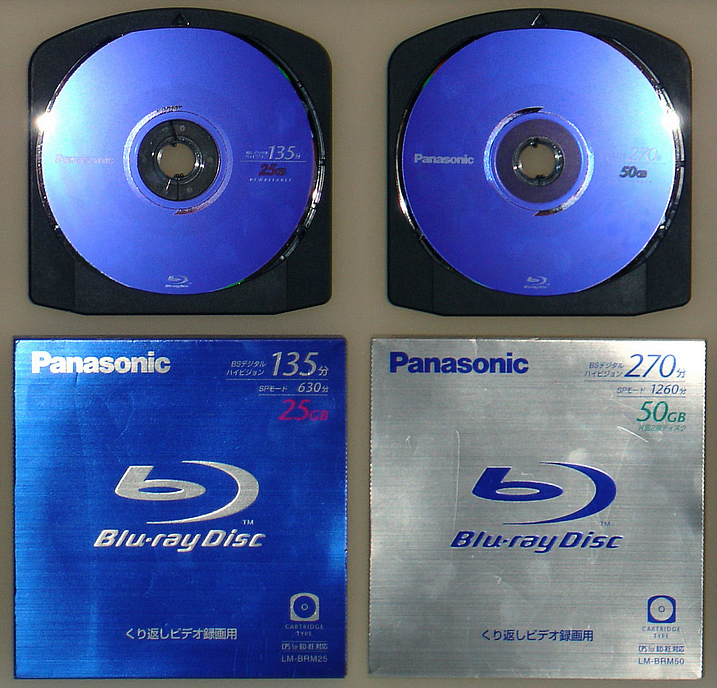
By the early 2000s, DVDs had begun to eclipse the use of videotapes, which in some regards were still somewhat prevalent.

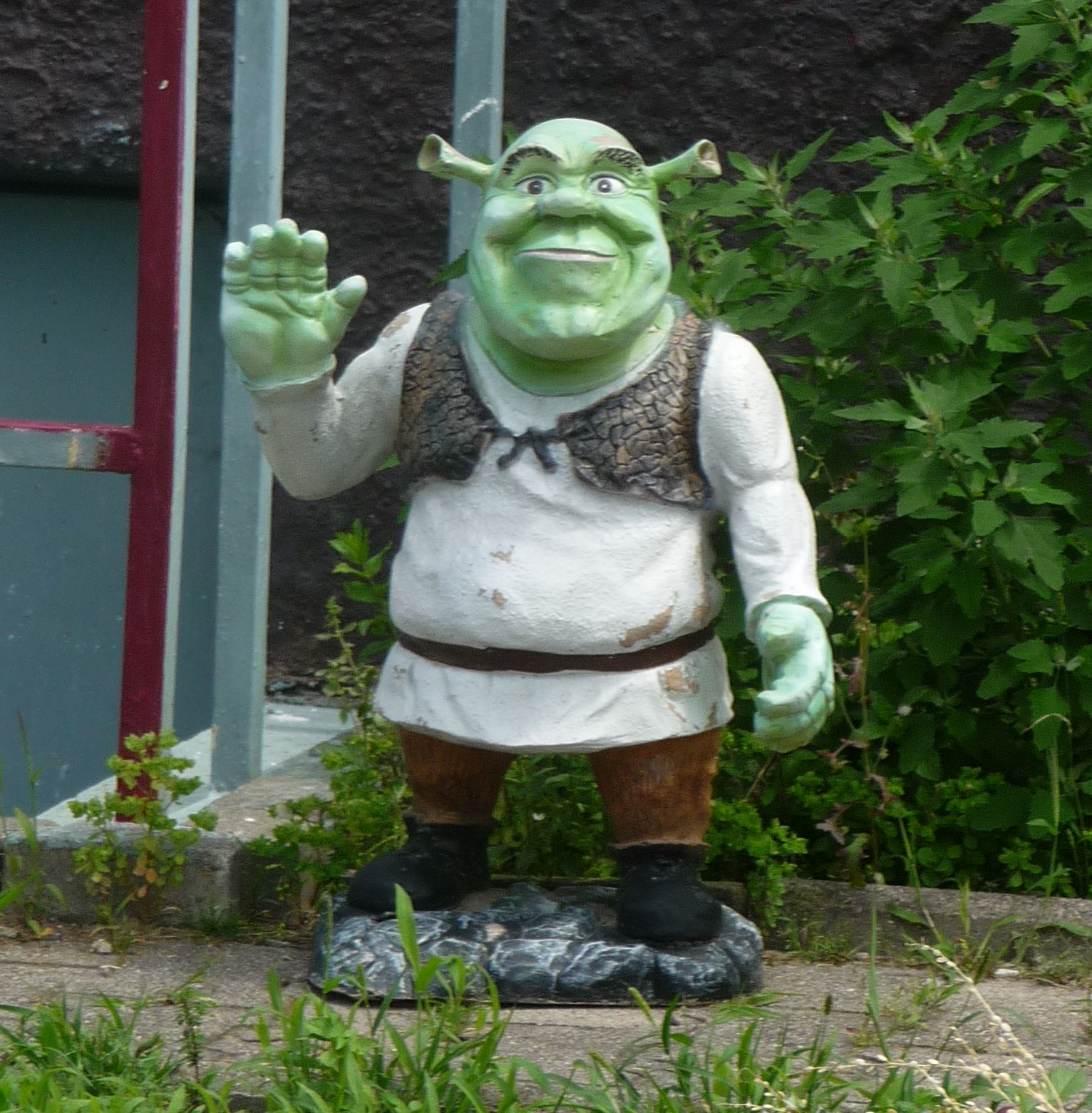
With the advancements and rise in computer technologies, computer-animated films like Shrek, Monsters, Inc., Finding Nemo, The Incredibles, Madagascar, Ratatouille, Kung Fu Panda, WALL-E, and Up were produced by DreamWorks Animation, and Disney-Pixar took over the declining traditionally animated movie industry.

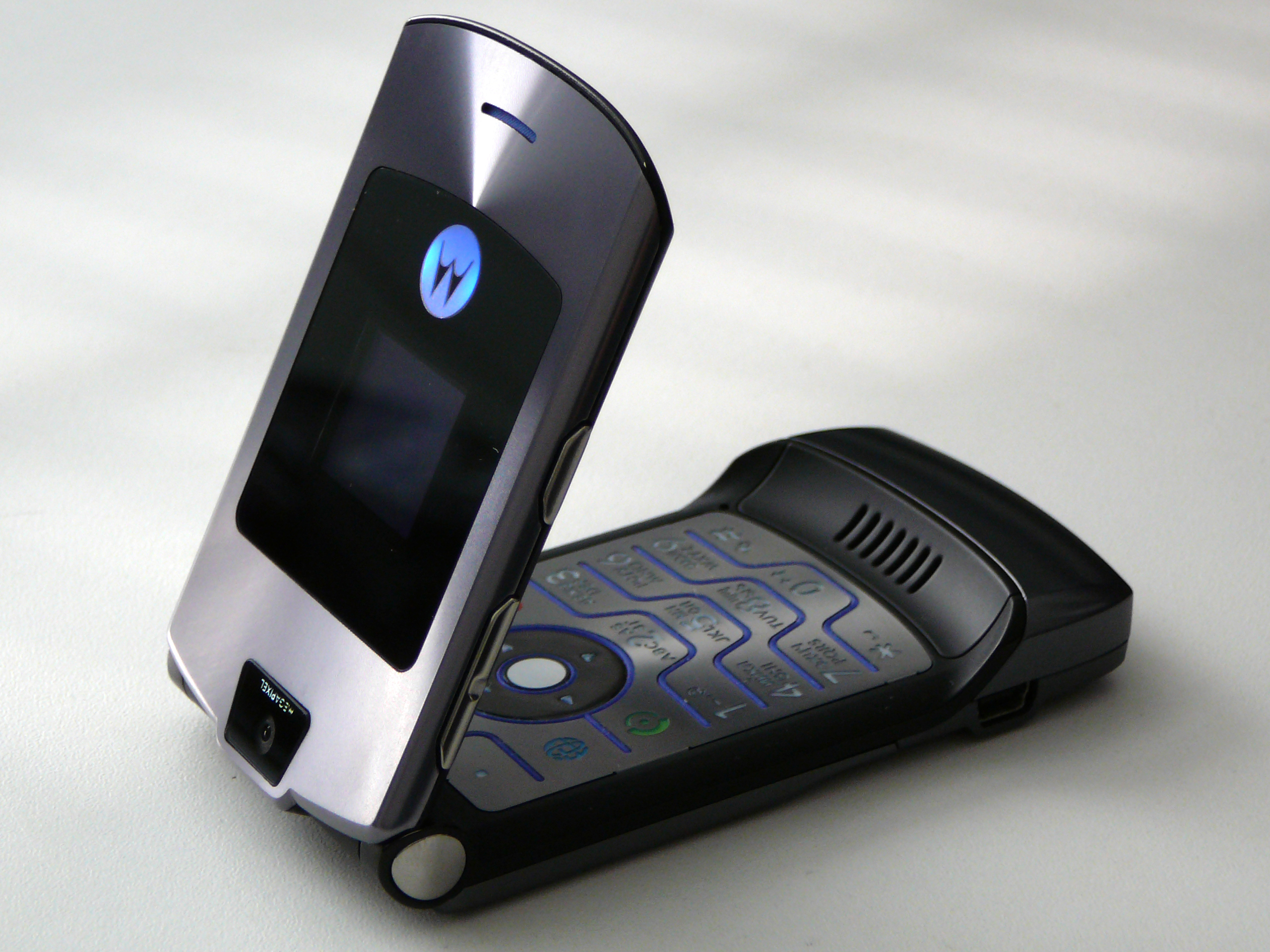
Flip phones (such as the Motorola Razr V3i pictured here), PDAs, and keyboard phones were commonplace throughout the decade, like BlackBerry and Motorola phones. By the 2010s, newly-released smartphones like the iPhone was launches in 2007 had replaced flip-phones, PDAs, and keyboard phones.

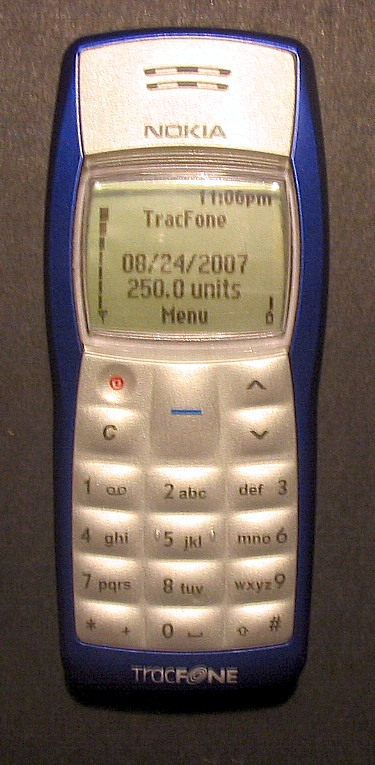
Over 250 million Nokia 1100s were sold since its launch in late 2003 up through 2009, making it the world's best-selling mobile phone and the best-selling consumer electronics device in the world at the time. Home telephones such as Landlines and Cordless telephones were also used in the 2000s.

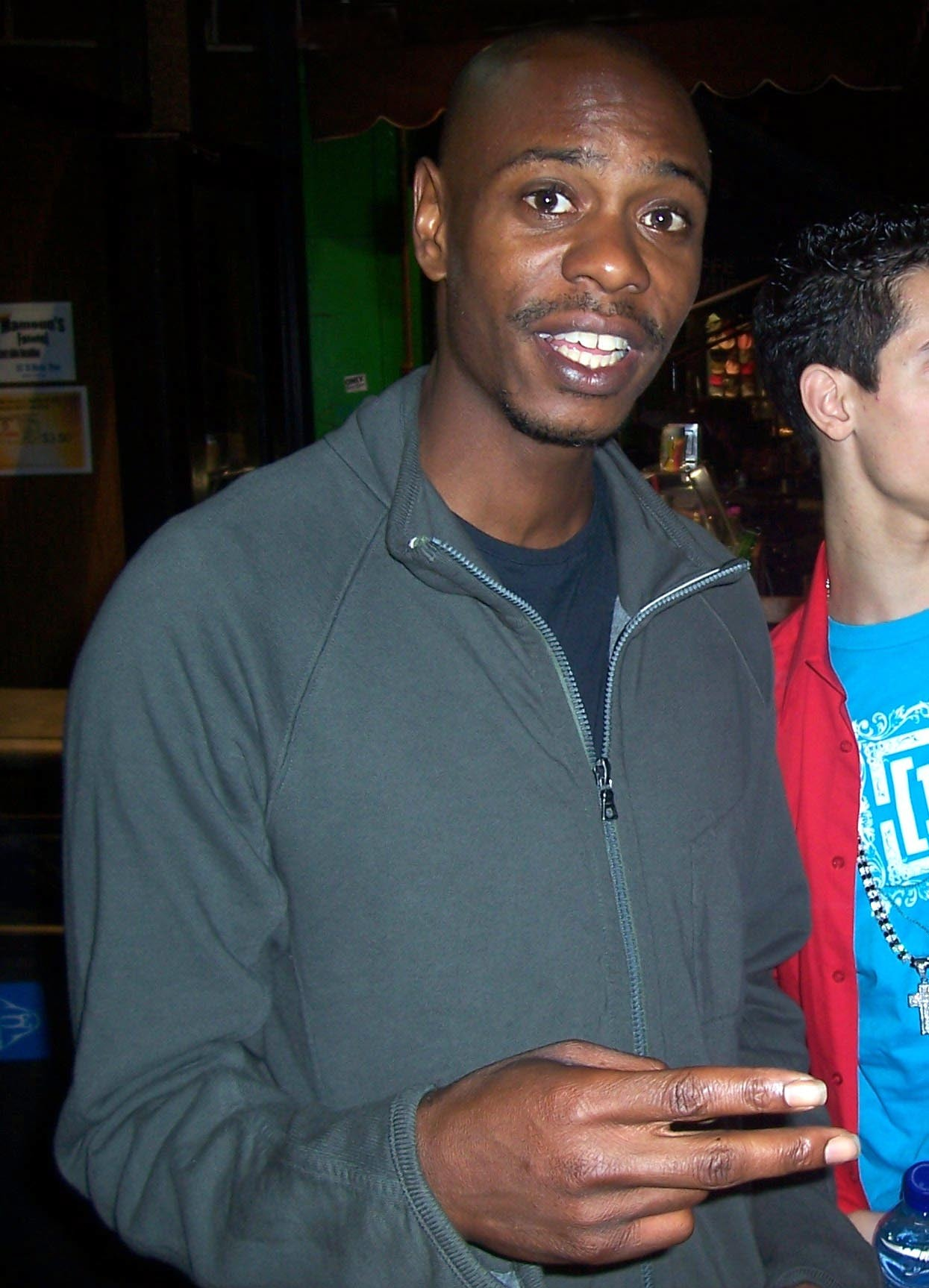
Comedian Dave Chappelle rose to fame during the mid-2000s with his satirical sketch show Chappelle's Show (2003–2006). Other popular comedy shows during the mid-2000s included The Bernie Mac Show and Everybody Hates Chris.

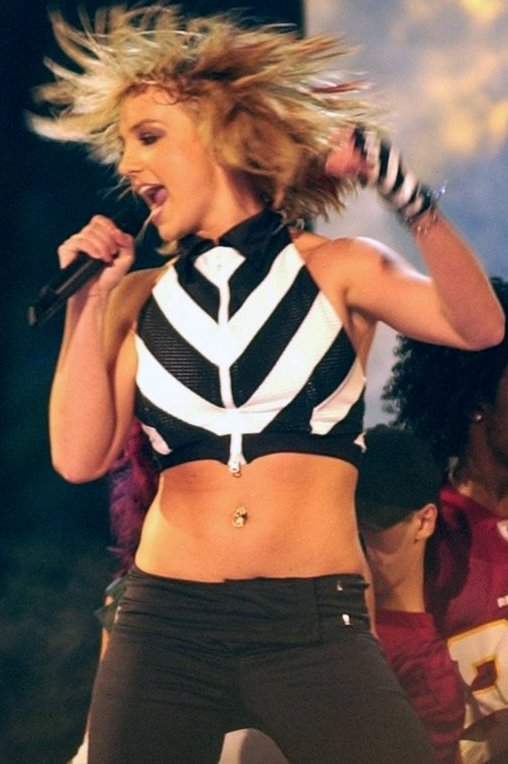
Popular female singers like Britney Spears, Christina Aguilera, Kylie Minogue, Miley Cyrus, Avril Lavigne, and Beyoncé; The became a global phenomenon in pop music and best-selling artists in the Millenial generation.

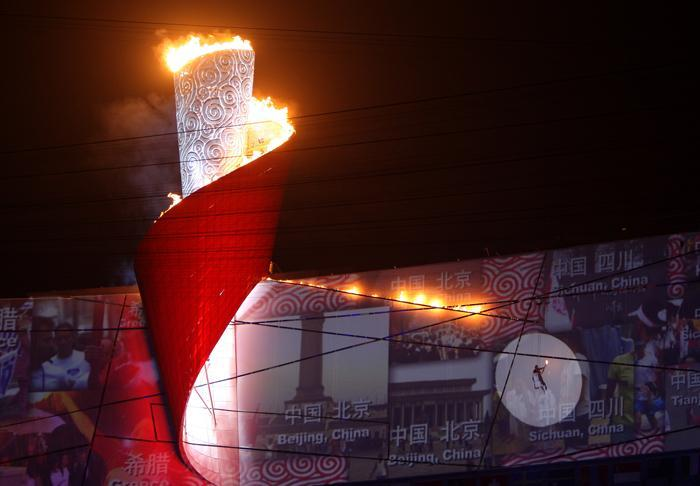
Five Olympic Games were held in the 2000s, Sydney in 2000, Salt Lake City in 2002, Athens in 2004, Turin in 2006 and Beijing in 2008.

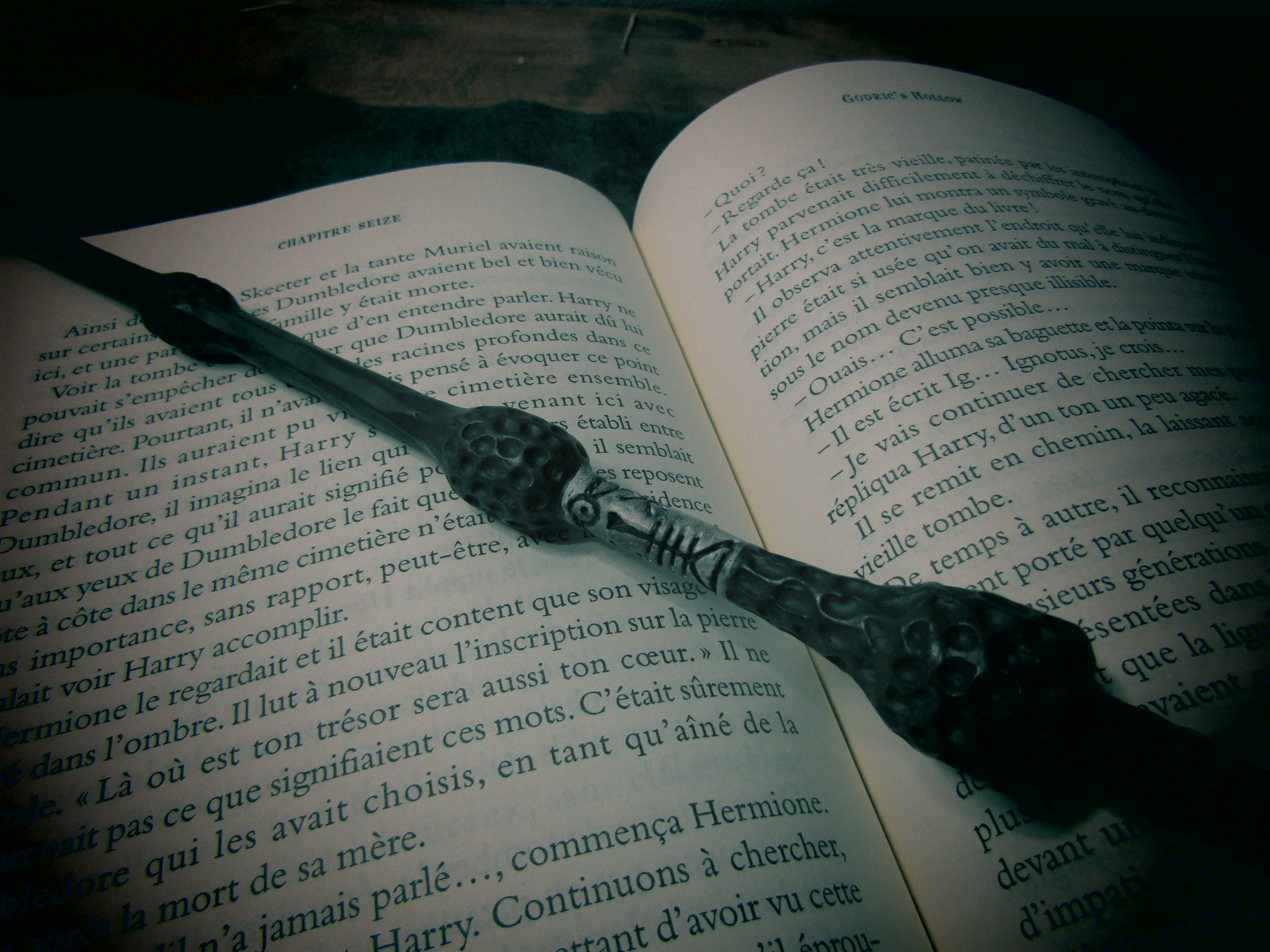
Warner Bros.' Harry Potter and The Lord of the Rings were the highest-grossing fantasy film series during the decade, based on J. K. Rowling's and J. R. R. Tolkien's novel series respectively. The final Harry Potter book released in 2007.

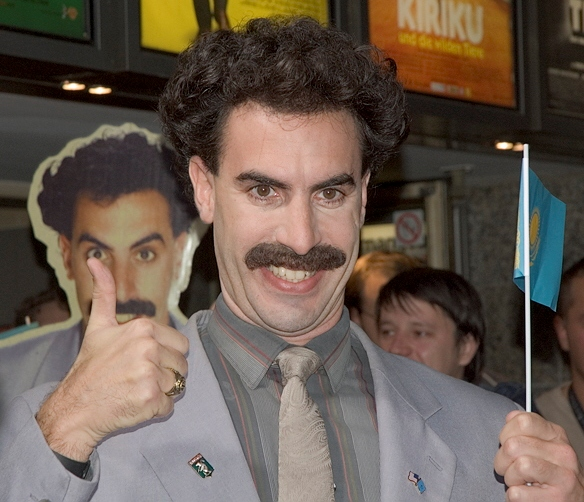
Mockumentaries grew in the 2000s, with mockumentary films such as Borat in 2006, and documentaries like Super Size Me, Bowling for Columbine, and Fahrenheit 9/11 were popular in the 2000s.

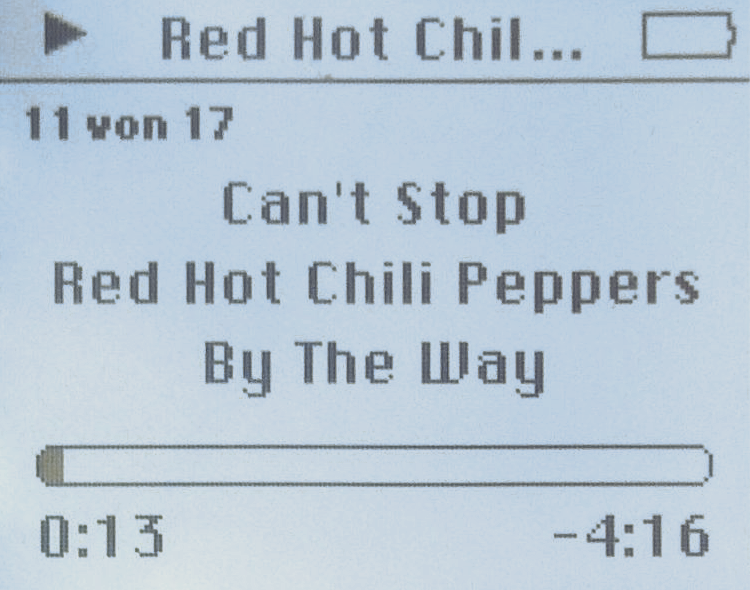
The Y2K aesthetic was popular in the late 1990s and early 2000s, named after the Y2K bug scare that caused concern between 1999 and 2000. This period was defined by then-new technology such as the 2001 iPod Classic, digital cameras, and fashion such as shiny metallic clothing.

The 2000s saw the rise of the Big Tech companies like Alphabet (Google), Amazon, Apple, Meta (then Facebook), and Microsoft, all headquartered in the West Coast of the United States.

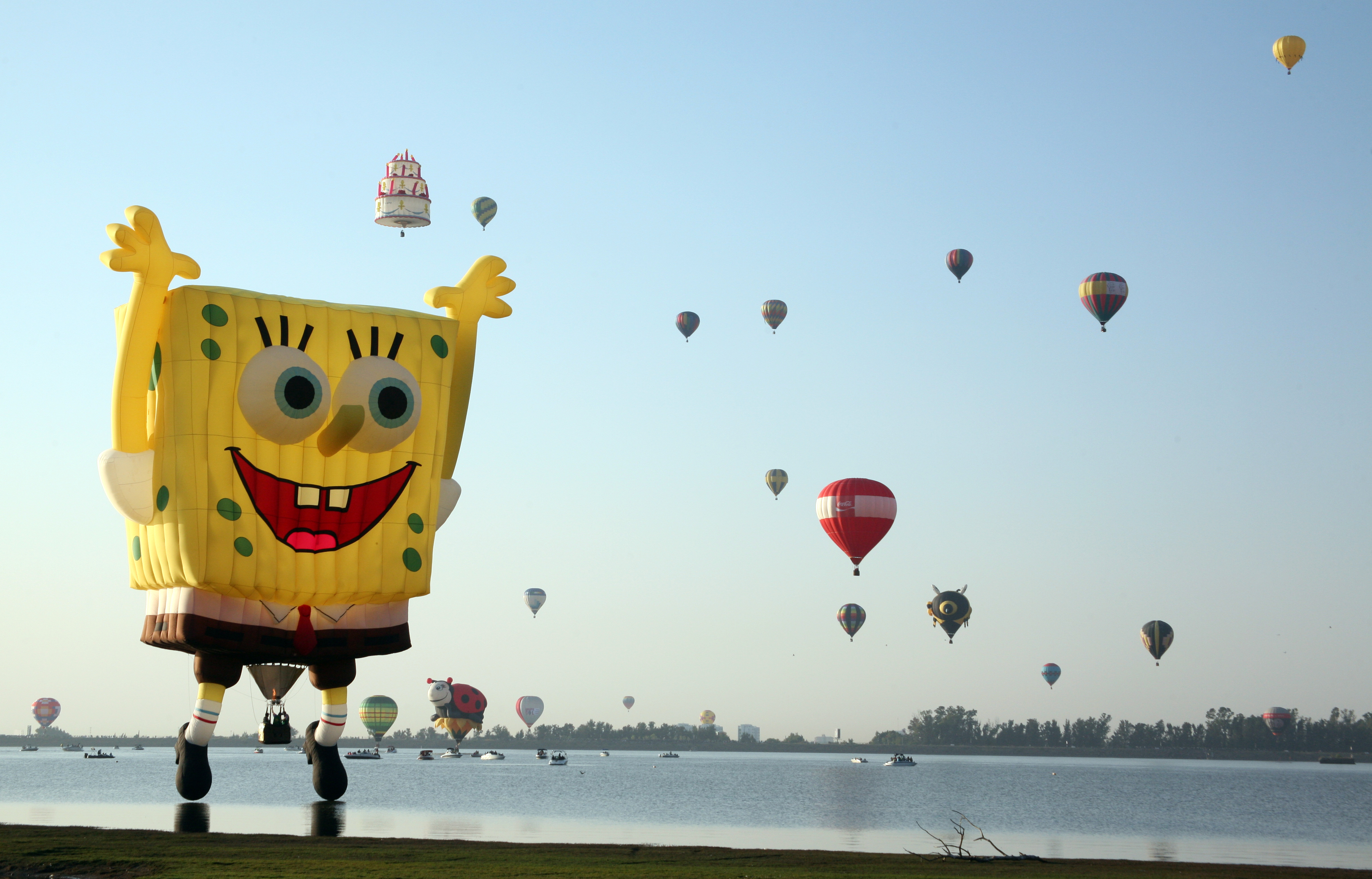
SpongeBob SquarePants and other cartoons like Avatar: The Last Airbender, Phineas and Ferb, Kim Possible, Dora the Explorer, Teen Titans, The Fairly OddParents, Ben 10, Totally Spies! and more were very popular throughout the 2000s.

George W. Bush was president of the United States for a majority of the 2000s (2001–2009), during the Post-Cold War era. Illinois senator Barack Obama was elected and succeeded as president in 2008.

=== Film ===
Live-action films

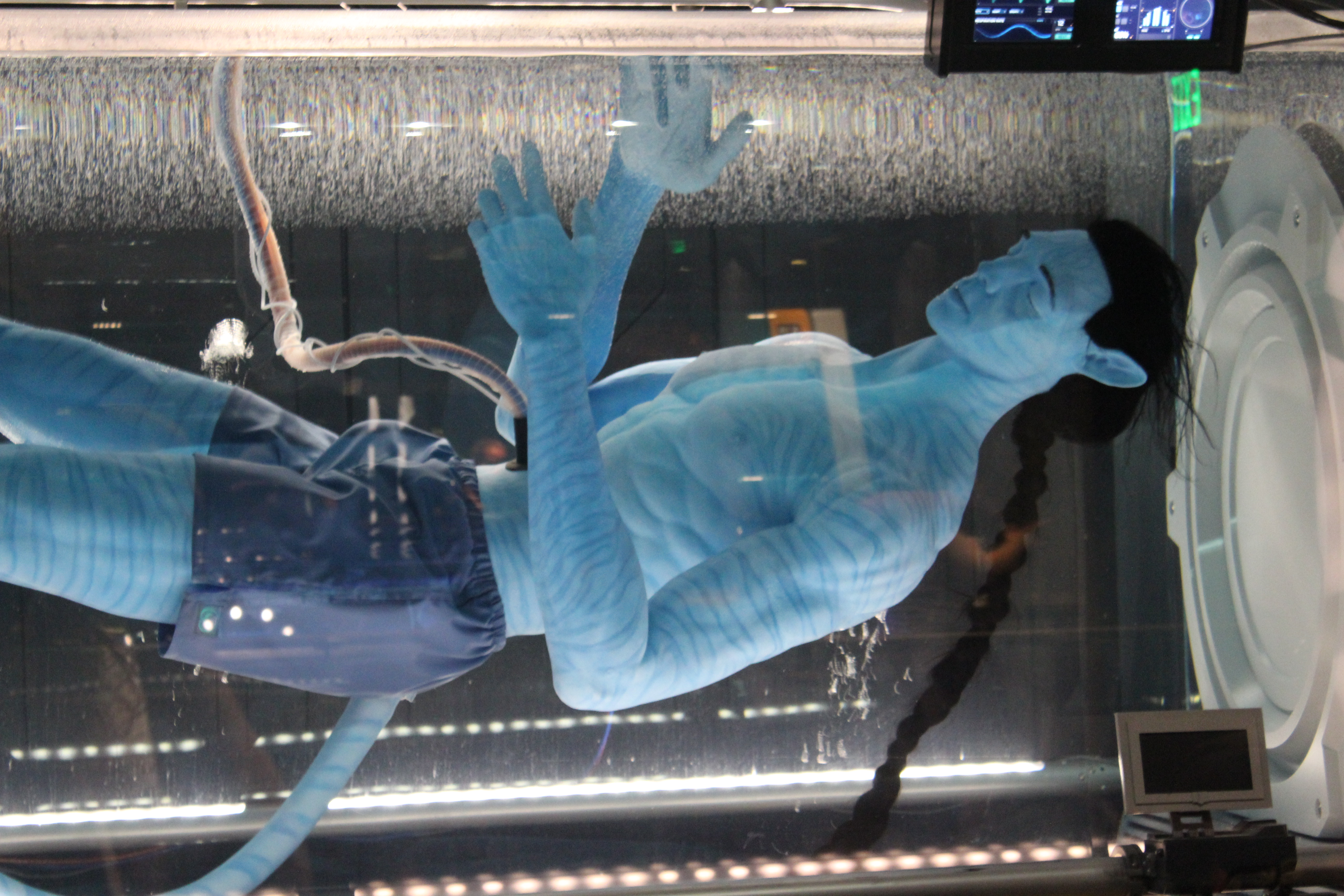
The highest-grossing film of the decade was Avatar (2009)

The usage of computer-generated imagery became more widespread in films during the 2000s. Documentary and mockumentary films, such as March of the Penguins, Borat, and Super Size Me, were popular in the 2000s. 2004's Fahrenheit 9/11 by Michael Moore is the highest-grossing documentary of all time. Online films became popular, and conversion to digital cinema started. Critically acclaimed movies released in the decade including highlights such as Eternal Sunshine of the Spotless Mind and Lost in Translation.

Other films from the 2000s that gained popularity included 300, Anchorman: The Legend of Ron Burgundy, Napoleon Dynamite, Saw, Zoolander, Shaun of the Dead (the first Three Flavours Cornetto film), Elf, Love Actually, The Room, The Hangover, and Billy Elliot. It also saw Musical films becoming widely successful such as Moulin Rouge!, 8 Mile, Chicago, Dreamgirls, Sweeney Todd: The Demon Barber of Fleet Street, and Mamma Mia!.

December 2009's Avatar, an American science fiction film written and directed by James Cameron, made extensive use of cutting edge motion capture filming techniques, and was released for traditional viewing, 3D viewing (using the RealD 3D, Dolby 3D, XpanD 3D, and IMAX 3D formats). It was also released in "4D" in select South Korean theaters.

3D films became more and more successful throughout the 2000s, culminating in the unprecedented success of 3D presentations of Avatar.

- Roger Ebert, described by Forbes as "the most powerful pundit in America", was skeptical of the resurgence of 3D effects in film, which he found unrealistic and distracting.
- In August 2004, American horror author Stephen King, in a column, criticized what he saw as a growing trend of leniency towards films from critics. His main criticism was that films, citing Spider-Man 2 as an example, were constantly given four star ratings that they did not deserve: "Formerly reliable critics who seem to have gone remarkably soft – not to say softhearted and sometimes softheaded – in their old age."

The Lord of the Rings: The Return of the King, a 2003 epic fantasy-drama film directed by Peter Jackson based on the second and third volumes of J. R. R. Tolkien's The Lord of the Rings, was nominated for eleven Academy Awards and won all the categories for which it was nominated. The film is tied for largest number of awards won with Ben-Hur (1959) and Titanic (1997).

The Passion of the Christ, a 2004 American film directed by Mel Gibson and starring Jim Caviezel as Jesus Christ, was highly controversial and received mixed reviews; however, it was a major commercial hit, grossing in excess of $600 million worldwide during its theatrical release.

The superhero film genre experienced renewed and intense interest throughout the 2000s. With high ticket and DVD sales, several new superhero films were released every year, including X-Men, Spider-Man and its sequel Spider-Man 2, Batman Begins and its sequel The Dark Knight, and Iron Man (which started the Marvel Cinematic Universe). Some media commentators attributed the increased popularity of such franchises to the social and political climate in Western society since the September 11th attacks, although others argued advances in special effects technology played a more significant role.

Animated films

Computer animated films became hugely popular following the release of Toy Story in the mid-1990s, as the production of traditional 2D animated films slowly started to decline, with several either underperforming or bombing at the box office.

Pixar and DreamWorks Animation proved themselves to be the most successful, yet rivaling, studios throughout the 2000s. Pixar enjoyed the critical and commercial successes of their features Monsters, Inc., Finding Nemo, The Incredibles, Cars, Ratatouille, WALL-E, and Up, while DreamWorks found its big break following the success of Shrek (which won the first Academy Award for Best Animated Feature in 2002), leading to them producing and releasing other films like Spirit: Stallion of the Cimarron, Shrek 2, Madagascar, Kung Fu Panda, and Monsters vs. Aliens. Disney Animation, meanwhile, saw several of its traditional 2D animated films underperforming, with the exception of films like The Emperor's New Groove, Lilo & Stitch, and The Princess and the Frog, leading to the studio beginning work on computer animated films, as they would continue to do so into the next two decades.

Other successful films included Ice Age and its first two sequels, The SpongeBob SquarePants Movie, The Polar Express, Happy Feet, The Simpsons Movie, and Cloudy with a Chance of Meatballs.

Stop motion animated films in that decade which mostly use live-action or computer animation methods included Chicken Run, Team America: World Police, Wallace & Gromit: The Curse of the Were-Rabbit, Corpse Bride, Flushed Away, Coraline, Fantastic Mr. Fox, Mary and Max, and A Town Called Panic. Anime films in the 2000s included Spirited Away, Tokyo Godfathers, Howl's Moving Castle, Paprika, and Ponyo. Independent animated works in that decade included Waking Life, The Triplets of Belleville, A Scanner Darkly, Persepolis, Sita Sings the Blues, Waltz with Bashir, and The Secret of Kells.

Award winners

Award	2000	2001	2002	2003	2004	2005	2006	2007	2008	2009
Academy Award for Best Picture winners	Gladiator	A Beautiful Mind	Chicago	The Lord of the Rings: The Return of the King	Million Dollar Baby	Crash	The Departed	No Country for Old Men	Slumdog Millionaire	The Hurt Locker
Palme d'Or winners at the Cannes Film Festival	Dancer in the Dark	The Son's Room	The Pianist	Elephant	Fahrenheit 9/11	L'Enfant	The Wind That Shakes the Barley	4 Months, 3 Weeks and 2 Days	The Class	The White Ribbon
César Award for Best Film winners	The Taste of Others	Amélie	The Pianist	The Barbarian Invasions	Games of Love and Chance	The Beat That My Heart Skipped	Lady Chatterley	The Secret of the Grain	Séraphine	A Prophet
Golden Lion winners at the Venice Film Festival	The Circle	Monsoon Wedding	The Magdalene Sisters	The Return	Vera Drake	Brokeback Mountain	Still Life	Lust, Caution	The Wrestler	Lebanon
Empire Award for Best Film	Gladiator	The Lord of the Rings: The Fellowship of the Ring	The Lord of the Rings: The Two Towers	The Lord of the Rings: The Return of the King	The Bourne Supremacy	King Kong	Casino Royale	The Bourne Ultimatum	The Dark Knight	Avatar
Best films of the Sight & Sound annual poll	N/A	N/A	N/A	N/A	N/A	Brokeback Mountain	Caché	4 Months, 3 Weeks and 2 Days	Hunger	A Prophet

=== Music ===
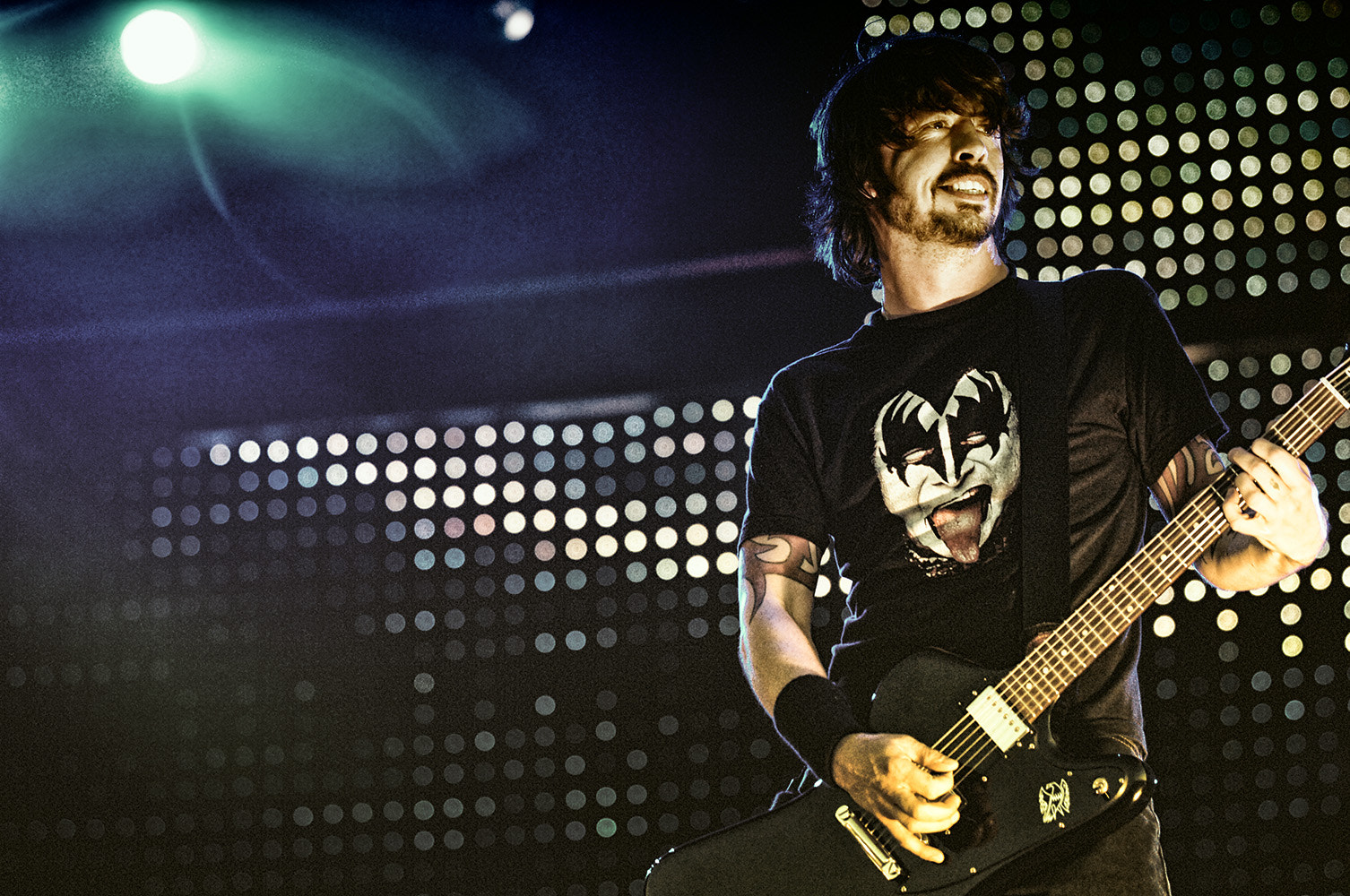
Dave Grohl of Foo Fighters performing in 2005. Foo Fighters are widely regarded as one of the most culturally significant rock bands of the 2000s. The decade saw Foo Fighters win the Grammy Award for Best Rock Album a record-breaking three times; in 2001, 2004, and 2008.

In the 2000s, the Internet allowed consumers unprecedented access to music. The Internet also allowed more artists to distribute music relatively inexpensively and independently without the previously necessary financial support of a record label. Music sales began to decline following the year 2000, a state of affairs generally attributed to unlicensed uploading and downloading of sound files to the Internet, a practice which became more widely prevalent during this time. Business relationships called 360 deals—an arrangement in which a company provides support for an artist, and, in exchange, the artist pays the company a percentage of revenue earned not only from sales of recorded music, but also live performances and publishing—became a popular response by record labels to the loss of music sales attributed to online copyright infringement.

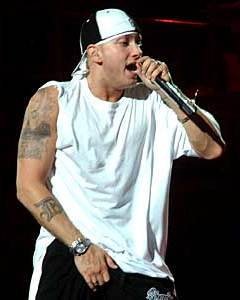
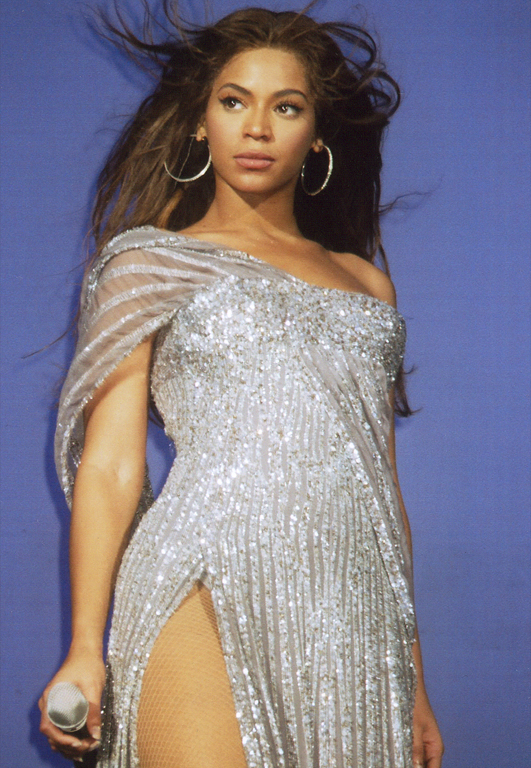
Eminem (left) and Beyoncé were two of the best-selling musical artists and most-culturally significant figures of the decade, pictured here in 2003 and 2007 respectively.

In the 2000s, hip-hop reached a commercial peak and heavily influenced various aspects of popular culture, dominating the musical landscape of the decade. The best-selling musical artist of the decade was American rapper Eminem, who sold 32 million albums. Other popular hip-hop artists included Jay-Z, Nas, Busta Rhymes, Kanye West, Ludacris, Common, Ja Rule, Mos Def, DMX, Missy Elliott, OutKast, Lil Jon, Fat Joe, Cam'ron, Pharrell, Gorillaz, Snoop Dogg, Twista, 50 Cent, Nelly, Lil Wayne, T.I., Young Jeezy and The Game. The genre was diverse stylistically, including subgenres such as gangsta rap and crunk.

R&B also gained prominence throughout the decade, and included artists such as D'Angelo, Aaliyah, Usher, Akon, Black Eyed Peas, R. Kelly, Amy Winehouse, Mary J. Blige, Jamie Foxx, Chris Brown, John Legend and Alicia Keys.

In alternative rock, the garage rock revival and post-punk revival entered the mainstream, with bands such as The Strokes, Interpol, The Killers, Arctic Monkeys, Bloc Party, Yeah Yeah Yeahs and The White Stripes seeing commercial success. Indie rock also saw a proliferation in the 2000s with numerous bands experiencing commercial success, including Modest Mouse, TV on the Radio, Franz Ferdinand, Death Cab for Cutie, Arcade Fire, Vampire Weekend, LCD Soundsystem, The Shins, Wilco, Bright Eyes, Spoon, The Decemberists, Broken Social Scene, Grizzly Bear and Fleet Foxes.

Other genres such as post-grunge, post-Britpop, nu metal and metalcore also achieved notability during the decade. Popular metal or hard rock bands consisted of Avenged Sevenfold, Bullet for My Valentine, Disturbed, Breaking Benjamin, Linkin Park, Slipknot, Mudvayne, Tenacious D, Incubus, System of a Down, Mastodon, The Mars Volta, Foo Fighters, Queens of the Stone Age, Three Days Grace, Godsmack, Shinedown, Limp Bizkit, Killswitch Engage, Evanescence, Tool, Deftones, Opeth, and Seether.

Pop-punk and emo-pop became popular in the decade, with bands like Blink-182, The Offspring, Green Day, Good Charlotte, My Chemical Romance, Fall Out Boy and Panic! at the Disco.

In the early and mid 2000s, disco-inspired dance genres became popular; french house and funky house songs broke into the charts. Popular tracks such as Daft Punk's "One More Time" Fonzerelli's "Moonlight Party", Kylie Minogue's "Spinning Around", Jamiroquai's "Little L", Michael Gray's "The Weekend" and Freemasons "Love on My Mind".

For Latin music Shakira dominated the charts with Fijación Oral, Vol. 1 being the 2nd best-selling Spanish album of all-time and the best-selling Spanish album of the 2000s being 11× platinum to date.

Billboard magazine named Eminem as the "artist of the decade" with the best performance on the Billboard charts (Note: Billboard awards are based on album and digital songs sales, radio airplay, streaming, touring and social engagement.) and Beyoncé as the "female artist of the decade", with Nickelback as the "band of the decade". In the UK, the biggest selling artist of the decade was Robbie Williams and the biggest selling band of the decade was Westlife.

On August 25, 2001, Aaliyah Haughton – a recording artist, dancer, actress and model – as well as eight others onboard were killed in an airplane crash in The Bahamas after filming the music video for the single "Rock the Boat". On November 29, 2001, George Harrison – best known as a member of the Beatles, one of the most popular bands in history – died of lung cancer at the age of 58. On April 25, 2002, Lisa Lopes (aka Left Eye) – a rapper, dancer and singer-songwriter best known as a member of the R&B/hip-hop girl group TLC – was killed in a car crash in La Ceiba, Honduras. On October 30, 2002, Jason William Mizell (aka Jam Master Jay) – a member of the pioneering hip-hop group Run-D.M.C – was shot and killed in a Merrick Boulevard recording studio in Jamaica, Queens. On December 25, 2006, James Brown – a recording artist known as the "Godfather of Soul" – died of pneumonia at the age of 73. On September 12, 2003, Johnny Cash – a country musician known as the "Man in Black" – died of diabetes at the age of 71. On June 10, 2004, Ray Charles – one of the pioneers of soul music – died of liver failure at the age of 73. On June 25, 2009, recording artist and dancer Michael Jackson – one of the highest-selling musicians of all time – died of a drug overdose, creating the largest global public mourning since the death of Diana, Princess of Wales in 1997. Other notable deaths of musical artists in the 2000s were Joey Ramone and Chet Atkins in 2001, Waylon Jennings in 2002, Maurice Gibb and Elliott Smith in 2003, Rick James and Ol' Dirty Bastard in 2004, J Dilla in 2006, Ike Turner and Dan Fogelberg in 2007, and Les Paul in 2009.

In 2002, Robbie Williams signed a record-breaking £80 million contract with EMI, the biggest music deal in British history.

The 2000s gave rise to a new trend in music production with the growing use of auto-tune. The effect was first popularized in the early 2000s by Eiffel 65 with their 1998 hit song "Blue (Da Ba Dee)", which came to global prominence in 2000. It was also used in certain tracks off critically acclaimed 2001 albums from Daft Punk (with Discovery) and Radiohead (with Amnesiac). By 2008, auto-tune was part of the music mainstream with artists such as Lil Wayne, T-Pain and Kanye West utilizing it in their hit albums Tha Carter III, Three Ringz and 808s & Heartbreak respectively. Towards the end of the decade, electronic dance music began to dominate western charts (as it would proceed to in the following decade), and in turn helped contribute to a diminishing amount of rock music in the mainstream. Hip-hop also saw a decline in the mainstream in the late 2000s because of electronic music's rising popularity.

According to The Guardian, music styles during the 2000s changed very little from how they were in the latter half of the 1990s. The 2000s had a profound impact on the condition of music distribution. Recent advents in digital technology have fundamentally altered industry and marketing practices as well as players in unusual rapidity. According to Nielsen Soundscan, by 2009 CDs accounted for 79 percent of album sales, with 20 percent coming from digital, representing both a 10 percent drop and gain for both formats in 2 years.

Grime is a style of music that emerged from Bow, East London, England in the early 2000s, primarily as a development of UK garage, drum & bass, hip-hop and dancehall. Pioneers of the style include English rappers Dizzee Rascal, Wiley, Roll Deep and Skepta.

Michael Jackson's final album, Invincible, released on October 30, 2001, and costing $30m to record, was the most expensive record ever made.

The end of the 2000s decade also saw the dramatic rise of new pop stars such as Rihanna, Taylor Swift, Justin Bieber, Katy Perry, Nicki Minaj and Lady Gaga, all of whom would go on to become some of the best-selling musicians in history.

The general socio-political fallout of Iraq War also extended to popular music. In July 2002, the release of English musician George Michael's song "Shoot the Dog" proved to be controversial. It was critical of George W. Bush and Tony Blair in the lead up to the 2003 invasion of Iraq. The video showed a cartoon version of Michael astride a nuclear missile in the Middle East and Tony and Cherie Blair in bed with President Bush. The Dixie Chicks are an American country music band. During a London concert ten days before the 2003 invasion of Iraq, lead vocalist Maines said, "we don't want this war, this violence, and we're ashamed that the President of the United States [George W. Bush] is from Texas". The positive reaction to this statement from the British audience contrasted with the boycotts that ensued in the U.S., where "the band was assaulted by talk-show conservatives", while their albums were discarded in public protest. The original music video for the title song from American pop singer Madonna's American Life album was banned as music television stations thought that the video, featuring violence and war imagery, would be deemed unpatriotic since America was then at war with Iraq. She also made her widely considered "comeback" album with her tenth studio album Confessions on a Dance Floor which topped the charts worldwide in a record 40 countries. As of 2016 the album has sold more than 11 million copies worldwide. Madonna also made history by completing her Sticky & Sweet Tour which became the highest-grossing tour by a female artist and the tenth highest-grossing tour by an artist during 2008–2009.

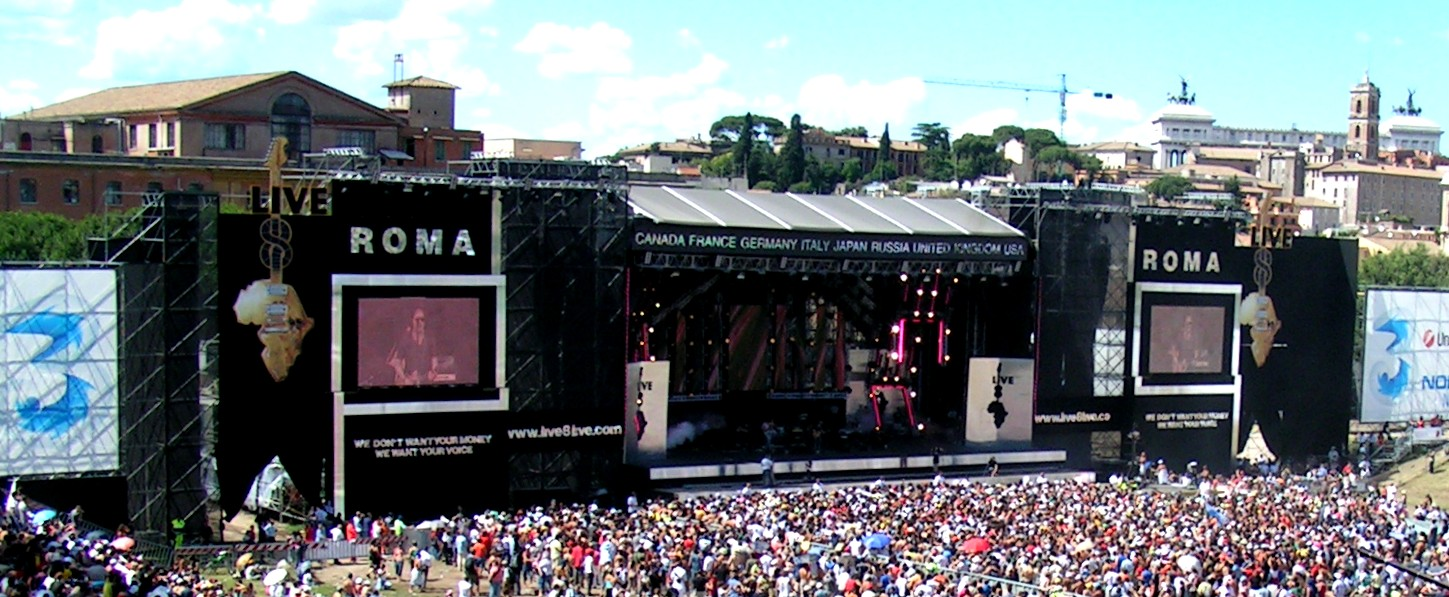
Live 8 concert in Rome, Italy, 2005

Live 8 was a string of benefit concerts that took place on July 2, 2005, in the G8 states and in South Africa. They were timed to precede the G8 conference and summit held at the Gleneagles Hotel in Auchterarder, Scotland from July 6 to 8, 2005; they also coincided with the 20th anniversary of Live Aid. Run in support of the aims of the UK's Make Poverty History campaign and the Global Call for Action Against Poverty, ten simultaneous concerts were held on July 2 and one on July 6. On July 7, the G8 leaders pledged to double 2004 levels of aid to poor nations from US$25 billion to US$50 billion by the year 2010. Half of the money was to go to Africa. More than 1,000 musicians performed at the concerts, which were broadcast on 182 television networks and 2,000 radio networks.

In November 2006, the Rolling Stones' 'A Bigger Bang' tour was declared the highest-grossing tour of all time, earning $437 million.

In December 2009, a campaign was launched on Facebook by Jon and Tracy Morter, from South Woodham Ferrers, which generated publicity in the UK and took the 1992 Rage Against the Machine track "Killing in the Name" to the Christmas Number One slot in the UK Singles Chart, which had been occupied the four consecutive years from 2005 by winners from the TV show The X Factor. Rage's Zack de la Rocha spoke to BBC One upon hearing the news, stating that:

"...We want to thank everyone that participated in this incredible, organic, grass-roots campaign. It says more about the spontaneous action taken by young people throughout the UK to topple this very sterile pop monopoly."

During the late 2000s, a new wave of chiptune culture took place. This new culture has much more emphasis on live performances and record releases than the demoscene and tracker culture, of which the new artists are often only distantly aware. Much of 2000s hip-hop was characterized as the "bling era", following the success of B.G.'s 1999 single Bling Bling, referring to forms of opulence and the material commodities that were popular from the early-to-mid part of the decade in hip-hop culture. However, by the end of the decade, an antecedent emotional rap subgenre gained prominence, with musical projects like Kanye West's fourth studio album 808s & Heartbreak (2008), Kid Cudi's debut album Man on the Moon: The End of Day (2009), and Drake's career catalyzing mixtape So Far Gone (2009) garnering significant popularity and ushering in a new era of hip-hop.

==== Reunions ====
The original five members of the English new wave band Duran Duran reunited in the early 2000s.

On February 23, 2003, Simon and Garfunkel reunited to perform in public for the first time in a decade, singing "The Sound of Silence" as the opening act of the Grammy Awards.

On May 9, 2006, British five-piece vocal pop Take That returned to the recorded music scene after more than ten years of absence, signing with Polydor Records. The band's comeback album, Beautiful World, entered the UK album chart at no. 1.

On December 10, 2007, English rock band Led Zeppelin reunited for the one-off Ahmet Ertegun Tribute Concert at The O2 Arena in London. According to Guinness World Records 2009, Led Zeppelin set the world record for the "Highest Demand for Tickets for One Music Concert" as 20 million requests for the reunion show were rendered online.

=== Internet ===
- Prominent websites and apps launched during the decade were Wikipedia (2001), Google Earth (2001), Internet Archive (2001), iTunes (2001), MySpace (2003), 4chan (2003), Facebook (2004), Flickr (2004), Mozilla Firefox (2004), YouTube (2005), Google Maps (2005), Reddit (2005), Twitter (2006), Pornhub (2007), Google Chrome (2008), Spotify (2008), Waze (2009).
- Wisdom of the crowd – during the decade, the benefits of the "Wisdom of the crowd" are pushed into the spotlight by social information sites such as Wikipedia, Yahoo! Answers, Reddit and other web resources that rely on human opinion.

In early 2001, Wikipedia was launched, which quickly became the largest and most popular online encyclopedia, and one of the most viewed sites on the web. In 2003, the first beta version of the Skype telephony software was launched. By the end of the decade, Skype will have over 600 million users. In 2004, the social network Facebook was launched. By the end of the decade, the site will be ranked 7th in its popularity on the web, and will have over 350 million active users worldwide. Co-founder Mark Zuckerberg pictured above in the site's infancy. YouTube was launched in 2005 and it quickly became the main site for video sharing, MySpace was one of the most popular social media sites in the 2000s but declined after the popularity of Facebook in 2008. Facebook launched in 2004. In 2008, Facebook surpassed MySpace as the most used social network. Facebook was mostly used by college students. Twitter was founded in 2006, and by 2009, moved up to the third-highest-ranking social networking site. WhatsApp, founded in 2009, rose to success and was eventually purchased by Facebook in the next decade.

The 2000s saw the rise of the podcast, a term first used in 2004. By 2009, one in four Americans had downloaded a podcast.

=== Fashion ===
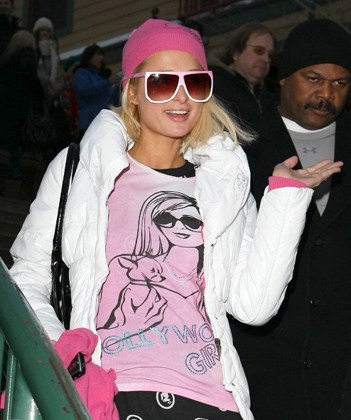
Paris Hilton was a fashion icon of the 2000s.

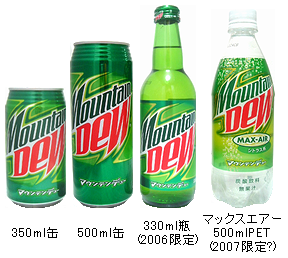
Mountain Dew bottles and cans from the 2000s decade, c. 2007

Fashion trends of the decade drew much inspiration from 1960s, 1970s and 1980s styles. Hair styles included the bleached and spiked hair for boys and men and long and straight hair for girls and women continued, as well as other hairstyles from the mid-late 1990s. Kelly Clarkson made chunky highlights fashionable in 2002 on American Idol and lasted until about 2007. Both women and men highlighted their hair until the late 2000s.

The decade started with the futuristic Y2K fashion which was built on hype surrounding the new millennium. This dark, slinky style remained popular until 9/11 occurred and casual fashions had made a comeback once again. Low rise pants were the go-to for women in the early to mid 2000s. Baggy cargo pants were extremely popular among both sexes throughout the early and mid 2000s until about late 2007. Bell-bottoms were the dominant pant style for women until about 2006 when fitted pants began rising in popularity. The late 1990s-style baggy pants remained popular throughout the early 2000s, but by 2003 boot-cut pants and jeans became the standard among men until about 2008.

The 2000s saw a revival of 1980s fashion trends such as velour tracksuits in the early 2000s (an early 1980s fashion), and tapered pants in the later years (a late 1980s fashion). Skinny jeans became a staple clothing for young women and men. By 2009 with the Jerkin' movement playing a large part in the popularization of skinny jeans. Mass brands Gap and Levi launched their own lines for skinny jeans.

Throughout the early and mid 2000s, adults and children wore Skechers shoes. The company used celebrities to their advantage, including Britney Spears, Christina Aguilera, Carrie Underwood, and Ashlee Simpson. By the late 2000s, flatter and more compact shoes came into style as chunky sneakers were no longer the mode.

"Geek chic" refers to a minor fashion trend that arose in the mid-2000s in which young individuals adopted stereotypically "geeky" fashions, such as oversized black Horn-rimmed glasses, suspenders/braces, and highwater trousers. The glasses—worn with non-prescription lenses or without lenses—quickly became the defining aspect of the trend, with the media identifying various celebrities as "trying geek" or "going geek" for their wearing such glasses, such as David Beckham, Justin Timberlake and Myleene Klass. Meanwhile, in the sports world, many NBA players wore "geek glasses" during post-game interviews, drawing comparisons to Steve Urkel.

Emo fashion became popular amongst teenagers for most of the 2000s, associated with the success of bands tied to the subculture (many of whom started at the beginning of the 2000s and rose to fame during the middle part of the decade, such as Brand New, The Used, Hawthorne Heights, My Chemical Romance, Fall Out Boy, Paramore, Panic! at the Disco and more). The style is commonly identified with wearing black/dark coloured skinny jeans, T-shirts bearing the name of emo music groups and long side-swept bangs, often covering one or both eyes. The Scene subculture that emerged in the mid-late 2000s drew much inspiration from Emo style.

Hip hop fashion was popular throughout the 2000s with clothing and shoe brands such as Rocawear, Phat Farm, G-Unit clothing, Billionaire Boys Club, Dipset clothing, Pelle Pelle, BAPE, Nike, Fubu, and Air Jordan. Followers of Hip Hop wore oversized shorts, jewelry, NFL and NBA jerseys, pants, and T-shirts. By the late 2000s this gave way more to fitted and vibrantly colored clothing, with men wearing skinny jeans as influenced by the Hyphy and Jerkin' movements.

In cosmetic applications, a Botox injection, consisting of a small dose of Botulinum toxin, can be used to prevent development of wrinkles by paralyzing facial muscles. As of 2007, it is the most common cosmetic operation, with 4.6 million procedures in the United States, according to the American Society of Plastic Surgeons.

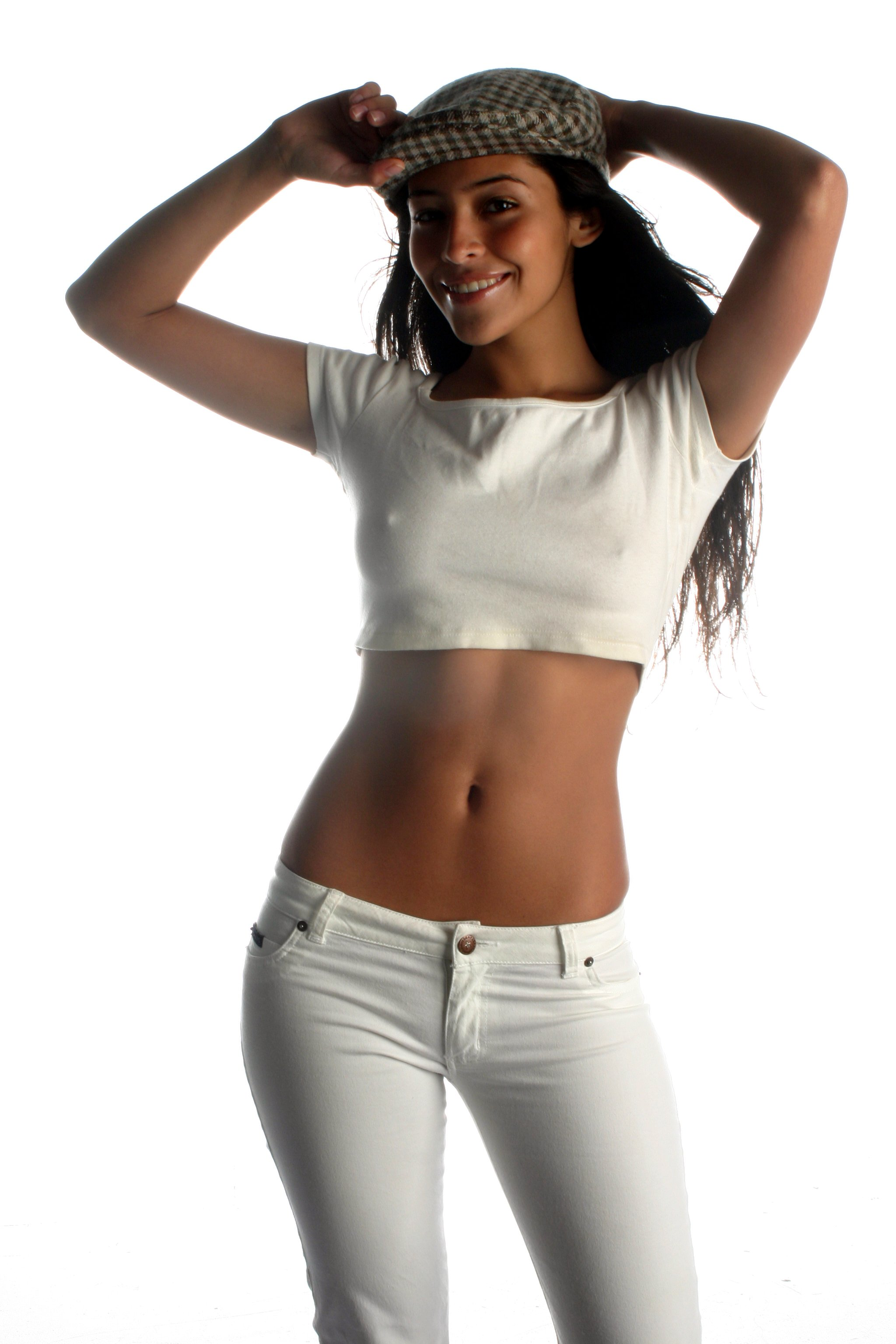
Caps with crop tops and low-rise pants were popular as women's wear throughout the early and mid 2000s

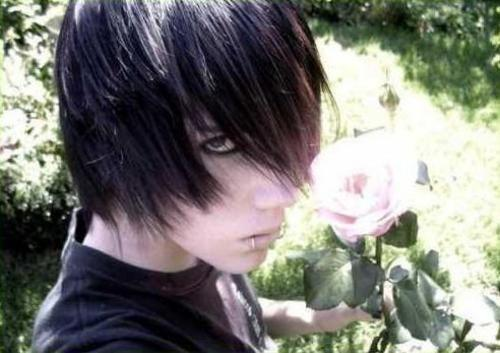
Typical 2000s emo hairstyle

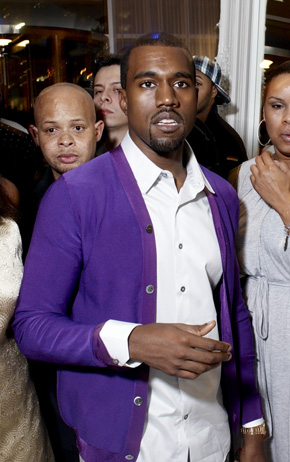
Cardigans regained popularity in the later part of the decade, worn here by Kanye West in 2007

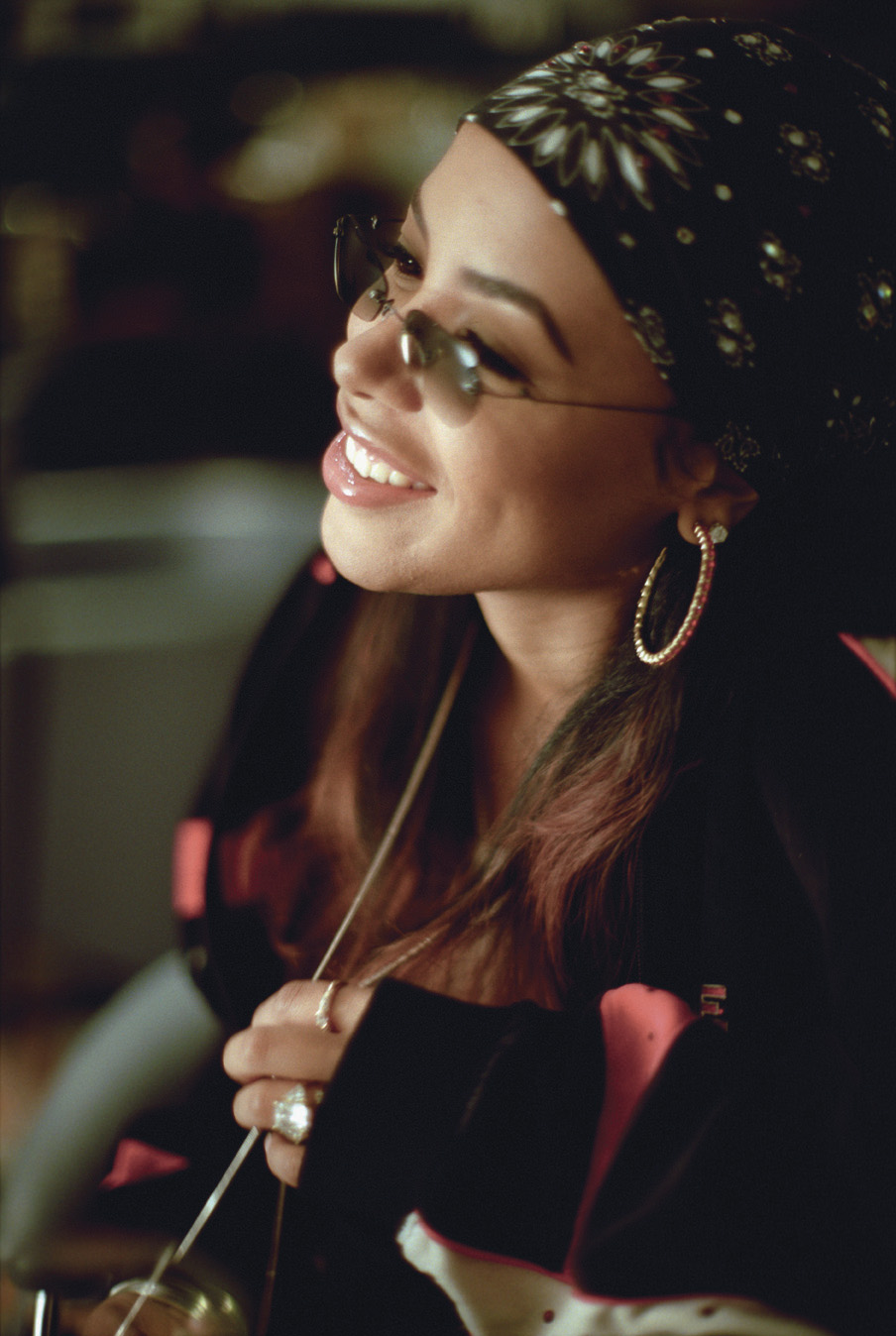
Bandanas, large hoop earrings and wireframe rectangle sunglasses were fashion trends in the early-2000s, as modeled here by R&B artist Aaliyah in 2000

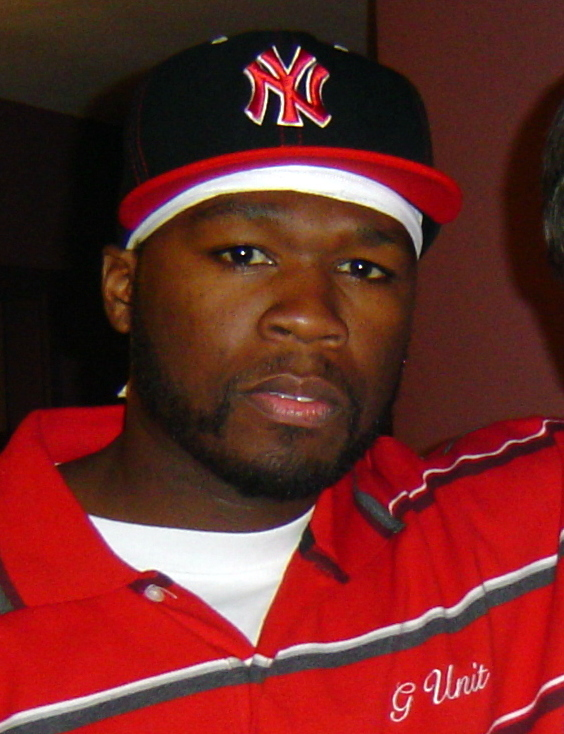
Durags, snapbacks and polo shirts were popular in the 2000s as men's wear, shown here by rapper 50 Cent in 2006

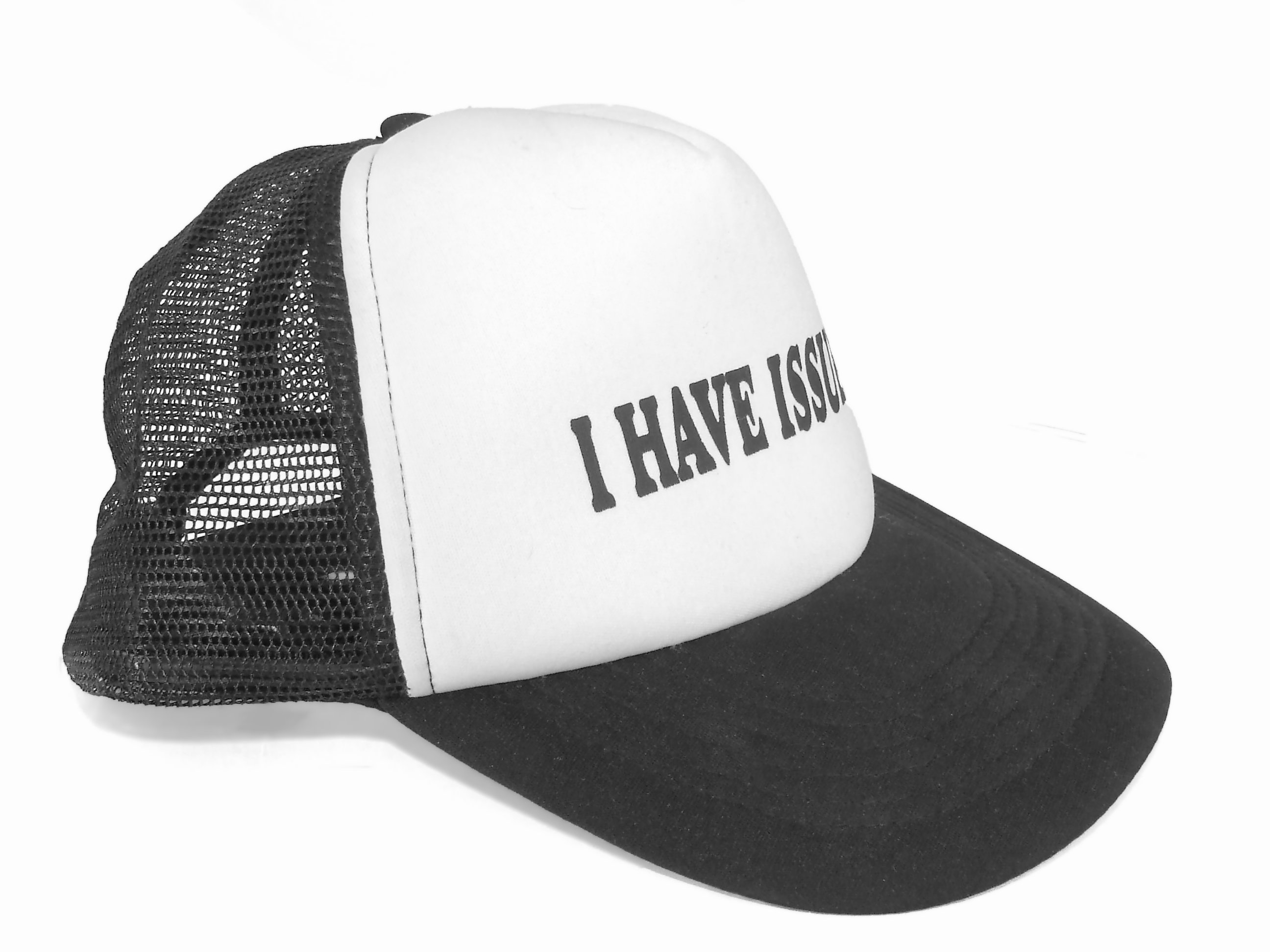
Trucker hats became popular in the early-to-mid 2000s

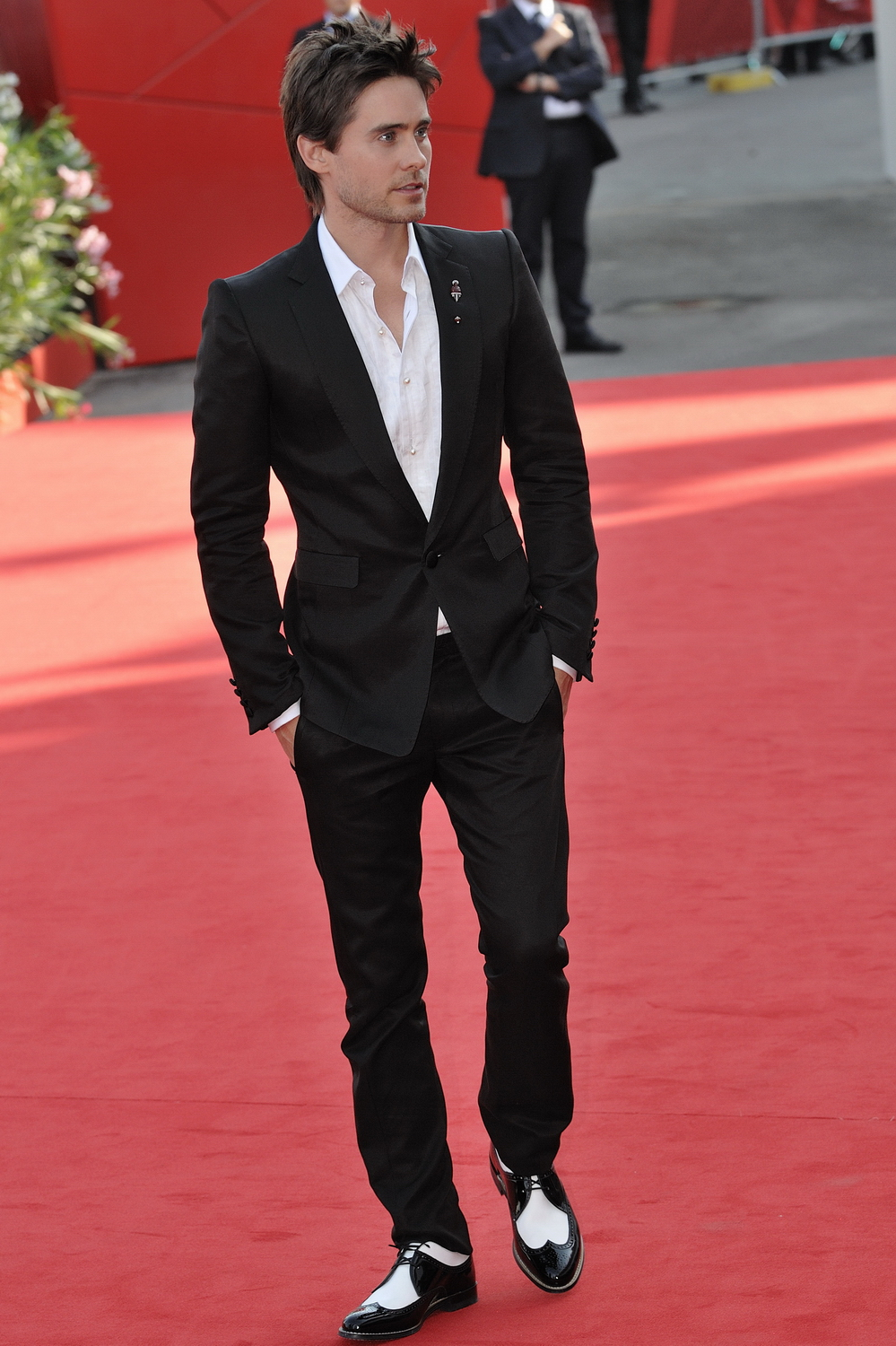
Jared Leto wearing slim-fit formal wear, popular from 2008 onwards

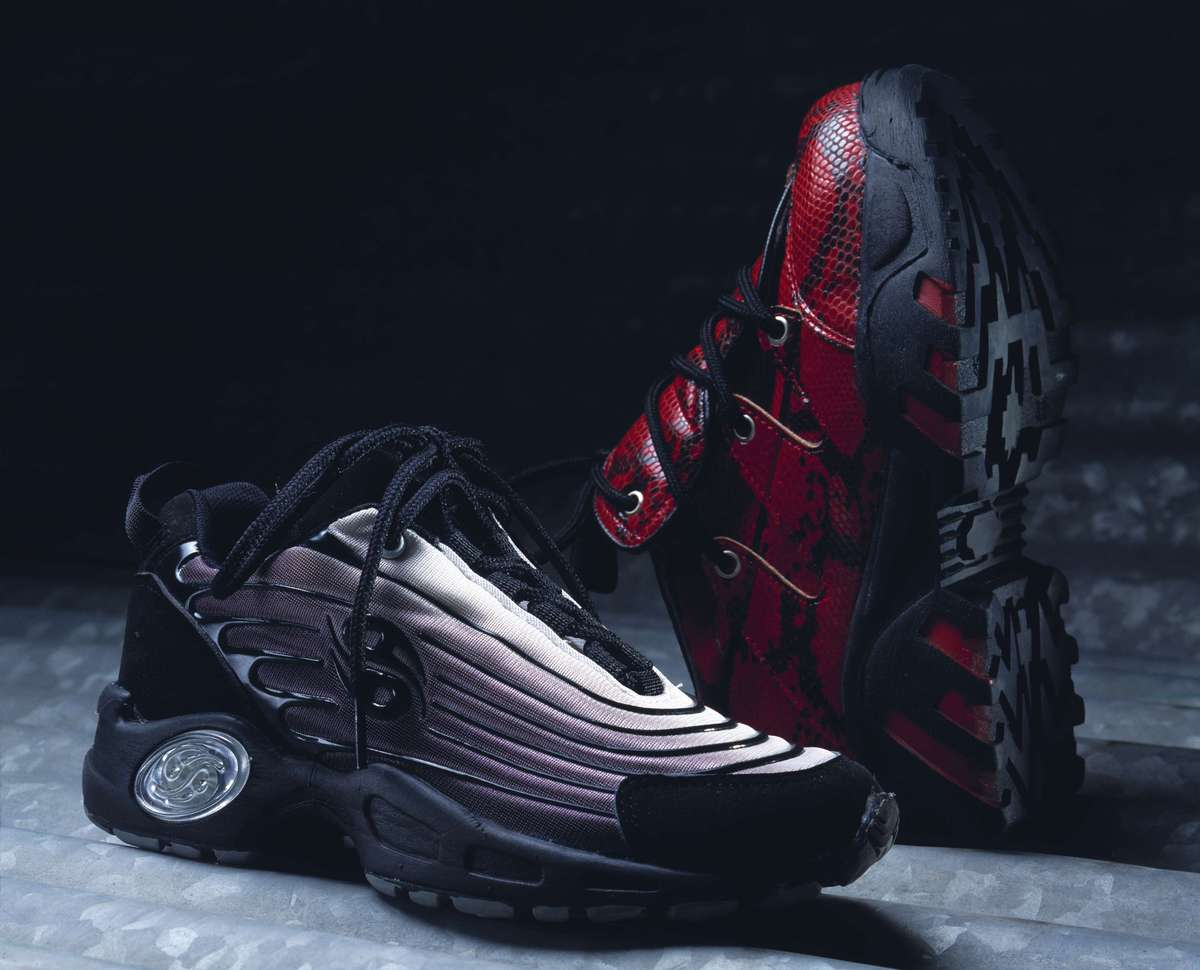
Chunky sneakers of the early 2000s

=== Journalism ===
- "It was, we were soon told, 'the day that changed everything', the 21st century's defining moment, the watershed by which we would forever divide world history: before, and after, 9/11." ~ The Guardian
- The BBC's foreign correspondent John Simpson on Rupert Murdoch (March 15, 2010):
  I do think that he and the newspapers he's run have introduced an uglier side, an abusive side, into journalism and life in general in this country.
  He says this Murdochisation of national discourse, which was at its height in the UK with The Sun in the 1980s, has now migrated to the US. "Murdoch encouraged an ugly tone, which he has now imported into the US and which we see every day on Fox News, with all its concomitant effects on American public life – that fierce hostility between right and left that never used to be there, not to anything remotely like the same extent."
- October 2001, Canadian author and social activist known for her political analyses Naomi Klein's book titled Fences and Windows:
  On September 11, [2001] watching TV replays of the buildings exploding over and over again in New York and Washington, I couldn't help thinking about all the times media coverage has protected us from similar horrors elsewhere. During the Gulf War, for instance, we didn't see real buildings exploding or people fleeing, we saw a sterile Space Invader battlefield, a bomb's-eye view of concrete targets – there and then none. Who was in those abstract polygons? We never found out.
- May 15, 2003, Fox News Channel's (which grew during the late 1990s and 2000s to become the dominant cable news network in the United States.) political commentator Bill O'Reilly's "The Talking Points Memo", from his The O'Reilly Factor television talk show:
  So, Talking Points urges the Pentagon to stop the P.R. dance and impose strict rules of conduct for the Iraqi people to follow. Law-abiding Iraqis want that. It's only the gangsters and the fanatics who don't. Shoot looters to kill, and aim well.
  And that's The Memo.
- A poll released in 2004, by the Pew Research Center for the People and the Press, found that 21 percent of people aged 18 to 29 cited The Daily Show (an American late night satirical television program airing each Monday through Thursday) and Saturday Night Live (an American late-night live television sketch comedy and variety show) as a place where they regularly learned presidential campaign news. By contrast, 23 percent of the young people mentioned ABC, CBS or NBC's nightly news broadcasts as a source. When the same question was asked in 2000, Pew found only 9 percent of young people pointing to the comedy shows, and 39 percent to the network news shows. One newspaper, Newsday, has The Daily Show's host Jon Stewart, listed atop a list of the 20 media players who will most influence the upcoming presidential campaign. Random conversations with nine people, aged 19 to 26, waiting to see a taping of The Daily Show, revealed two who admitted they learned much about the news from the program. None said they regularly watched the network evening news shows.
- The Guardian, is a British national daily newspaper. In August 2004, for the US presidential election, The Guardian's daily "G2" supplement launched an experimental letter-writing campaign in Clark County, Ohio, an average-sized county in a swing state. G2 editor Ian Katz bought a voter list from the county for $25 and asked readers to write to people listed as undecided in the election, giving them an impression of the international view and the importance of voting against US president George W. Bush. The paper scrapped "Operation Clark County" on October 21, 2004, after first publishing a column of complaints from Bush supporters about the campaign under the headline "Dear Limey assholes". The public backlash against the campaign likely contributed to Bush's victory in Clark County.
- March 2005 – Twenty MPs signed a British House of Commons motion condemning the BBC Newsnight presenter Jeremy Paxman for saying that "a sort of Scottish Raj" was running the UK. Mr Paxman likened the dominance of Scots at Westminster to past British rule in India.
- August 1, 2007 – News Corp. and Dow Jones entered into a definitive merger agreement. The US$5 billion sale added the largest newspaper in the United States, by circulation The Wall Street Journal to Rupert Murdoch's news empire.
- Ann Coulter is an American conservative social and political commentator, eight-time best-selling author, syndicated columnist, and lawyer. She frequently appears on television, radio, and as a speaker at public and private events. As the 2008 US presidential campaign was getting under way, Coulter was criticised for statements she made at the 2007 Conservative Political Action Conference about presidential candidate John Edwards:
  I was going to have a few comments on the other Democratic presidential candidate, John Edwards, but it turns out that you have to go into rehab if you use the word 'faggot,' so I'm... so, kind of at an impasse, can't really talk about Edwards, so I think I'll just conclude here and take your questions.
- In December 2008, Time magazine named Barack Obama as its Person of the Year for his historic candidacy and election, which it described as "the steady march of seemingly impossible accomplishments".

=== Print media ===
- The decade saw the steady decline of sales of print media such as books, magazines, and newspapers, as the main conveyors of information and advertisements, in favor of the Internet and other digital forms of information.
- News blogs grew in readership and popularity; cable news and other online media outlets became competitive in attracting advertising revenues and capable journalists and writers are joining online organizations. Books became available online, and electronic devices such as Amazon Kindle threatened the popularity of printed books.
- According to the National Endowment for the Arts (NEA), the decade showed a continuous increase in reading, although circulation of newspapers has declined.

=== Radio ===
The 2000s saw a decrease in the popularity of radio as more listeners starting using MP3 players in their cars to customize driving music. Satellite radio receivers started selling at a much higher rate, which allowed listeners to pay a subscription fee for thousands of ad-free stations. Clear Channel Communications was the largest provider of radio entertainment in the United States with over 900 stations nationwide. Many radio stations began streaming their content over the Internet, allowing a market expansion beyond the reaches of a radio transmitter.

During the 2000s, FM radio faced its toughest competition ever for in-car entertainment. iPod, satellite radio, and HD radio were all new options for commuters. CD players had a steady decline in popularity throughout the 2000s but stayed prevalent in most vehicles, while cassette tapes became virtually obsolete.

- August 27, 2001 – Hot 97 shock jock Star (real name Troi Torain) was suspended indefinitely for mocking R&B singer Aaliyah's death on the air. by playing a tape of a woman screaming while a crash is heard in the background. Close to 32,000 people signed a "No More Star" online petition.
- In a 2008 edition of his (American) radio show, John Gibson commented on Australian actor Heath Ledger's death the day before. He opened the segment with funeral music and played a clip of Jake Gyllenhaal's famous line "I wish I knew how to quit you" from Ledger's film Brokeback Mountain; he then said "Well, I guess he found out how to quit you." Among other remarks, Gibson called Ledger a "weirdo" with "a serious drug problem". The next day, he addressed outcry over his remarks by saying that they were in the context of jokes he had been making for months about Brokeback Mountain, and that "There's no point in passing up a good joke." Gibson later apologized on his television and radio shows.

=== Television ===
Live-action television

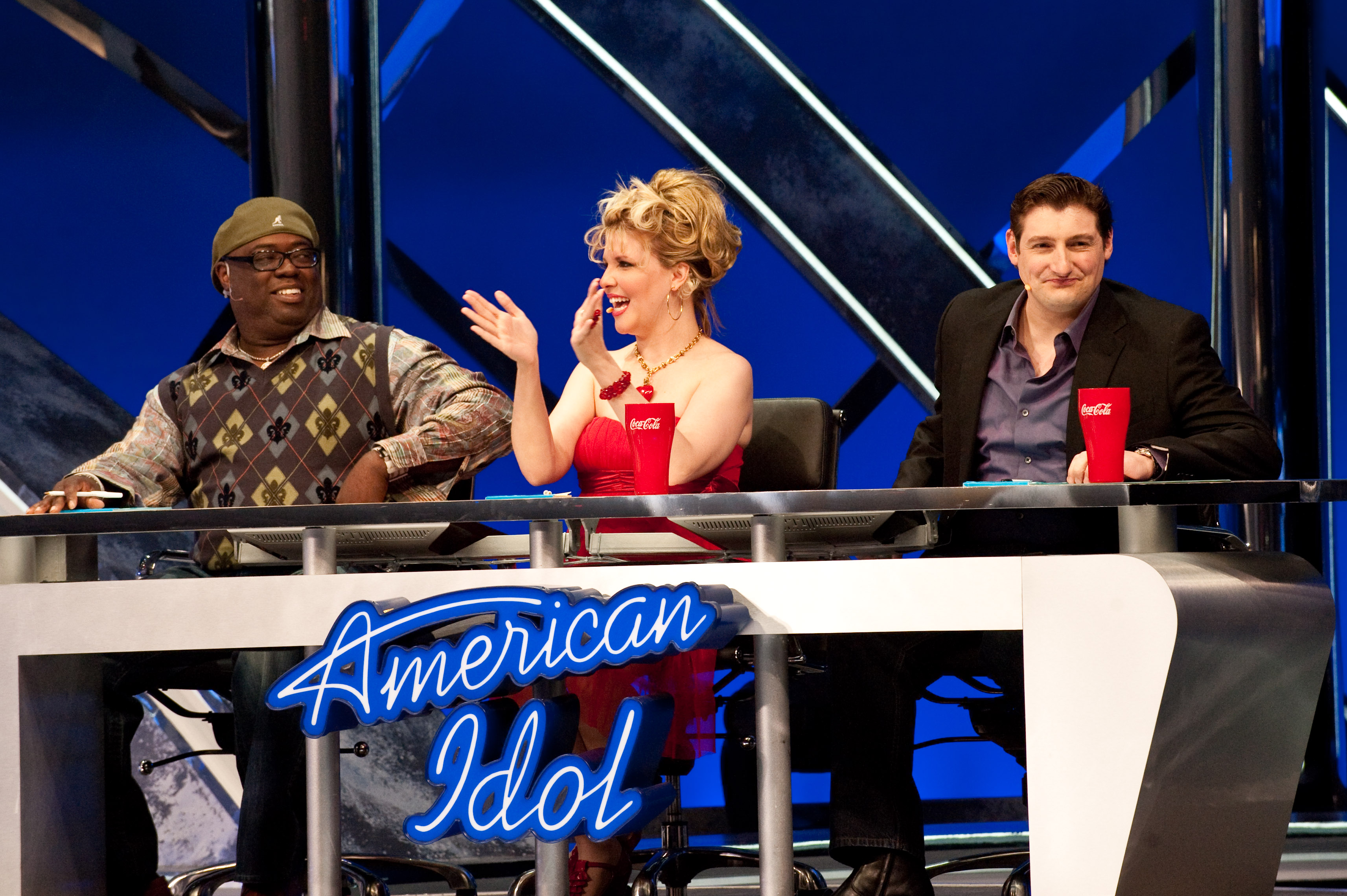
The television genre Reality TV gained massive popularity in America over the decade with reality TV programs such as Survivor,The Simple Life, Jersey Shore, American Idol (pictured) and Big Brother, for which local adaptations were produced in many countries

American television in the 2000s saw the sharp increase in popularity of reality television, with numerous competition shows such as American Idol, Dancing with the Stars, Survivor and The Apprentice attracting large audiences, as well as documentary or narrative style shows such as Big Brother, The Hills, The Real Housewives and Cheaters. Keeping Up with the Kardashians also aired during the decade, in 2007, and would run for 14 years and 20 seasons, thrusting the Kardashian family into the global pop-culture spotlight. Chappelle's Show was one of the most popular comedy shows of the decade. Upon its release in 2004, the first-season DVD set became the best-selling TV series set of all time.

Australian television in the 2000s also saw a sharp increase in popularity of reality television, with their own version of shows such as Big Brother and Dancing With The Stars, other shows in the country also saw an increase with comedy such as Spicks and Specks and game show Bert's Family Feud.

The decade has since seen a steady decline in the number of sitcoms and an increase in reality shows, crime and medical dramas, such as CSI: Crime Scene Investigation (2000–2015), it's spinoffs CSI: Miami (2002–2012) and CSI: NY (2004–2013), NCIS (2003–present), Without a Trace (2002–2009), House M.D. (2004–2012), and Grey's Anatomy (2005–present), paranormal/crime shows like Medium (2005–2011) and Ghost Whisperer (2005–2010), and action/drama shows, including 24 (2001–2010) and Lost (2004–2009). Comedy-dramas became more serious, dealing with such hot button issues, such as drugs, teenage pregnancy, and gay rights. Popular comedy-drama programs include Desperate Housewives (2004–2012), Ugly Betty (2006–2010), and Glee (2009–2015).

Disney Channel had seen a rise in views and popularity from kids as young as 6 years old. In 2001, Disney Channel premiered one of their original television series Lizzie McGuire. That's So Raven premiered in 2003, which was Disney Channel's first TV series starring a black female character. Shows that were also popularly known including Hannah Montana, Even Stevens, The Suite Life of Zack & Cody as well as it's spinoff The Suite Life on Deck and Wizards of Waverly Place.

Nickelodeon premiered Drake & Josh and Ned's Declassified School Survival Guide in 2004. iCarly was Nickelodeon's most watched TV series from its premiere in 2007–2012, then was rebooted in 2021 and cancelled in 2023. Other shows that also popular hits included Zoey 101, True Jackson, VP and Big Time Rush.

The 2000s notable sitcoms include 3rd Rock from the Sun, Two Guys and a Girl, Just Shoot Me!, The Drew Carey Show, Frasier, Friends, That '70s Show, Becker, Spin City, Dharma & Greg, Will & Grace, Yes, Dear, According to Jim, 8 Simple Rules, Less than Perfect, Still Standing, George Lopez, Grounded for Life, Hope & Faith, My Wife and Kids, Sex and the City, Everybody Loves Raymond, Malcolm in the Middle, Girlfriends, The King of Queens, Arrested Development, How I Met Your Mother, Scrubs, Curb Your Enthusiasm, What I Like About You, Reba, The Office, Entourage, My Name Is Earl, Everybody Hates Chris, The New Adventures of Old Christine, Rules of Engagement, Two and a Half Men, 'Til Death, The Big Bang Theory, Samantha Who?, It's Always Sunny in Philadelphia, and 30 Rock. A trend seen in several sitcoms of the late 2000s was the absence of a laugh track.

The decade also saw the rise of premium cable dramas such as The Sopranos, The Wire, Battlestar Galactica, Deadwood, The Shield, Nip/Tuck, Sons of Anarchy, Mad Men, and Breaking Bad. The critic Daniel Mendelsohn wrote a critique of Mad Men in which he also claimed this last decade was a golden age for episodic television, citing Battlestar Galactica, The Wire, and the network series Friday Night Lights as especially deserving of critical and popular attention.

The decade also saw the return of prime time soap operas, a genre that had been popular in the 1980s and early 1990s, including Dawson's Creek (1998–2003), The O.C. (2003–2007) and One Tree Hill (2003–2012). Desperate Housewives (2004–2012) was perhaps the most popular television series of this genre since Dallas and Dynasty in the 1980s. The medical soap opera Grey's Anatomy was another prime time serial that found immense success, helped by its original time slot following Desperate Housewives during its first two seasons, ER started in 1994 and ended its run on NBC in 2009, after 15 years, with its ratings sharply declining after Grey's Anatomy's premiere in 2005.

Animated shows

Adult-oriented animated programming also continued a sharp upturn in popularity with controversial cartoons like South Park (1997–present), Family Guy (1999–2002, 2005–present), The Boondocks (2005–2014) and Futurama (1999–2003, 2008–2013, 2023–present) along with the longtime running cartoon The Simpsons (1989–present), while new animated adult series were also produced in that decade such as American Dad!, Aqua Teen Hunger Force, The Venture Bros., Robot Chicken, Archer, Drawn Together, and Sealab 2021. Adult Swim was launched on Cartoon Network in September 2001 and was an immediate success, becoming one of the cornerstone brands of adult animation.

Anime series that achieved popularity during the decade included Naruto, Bleach, Code Geass, Death Note, Fullmetal Alchemist, Inuyasha, Yu-Gi-Oh!, Hellsing Ultimate, Black Lagoon, Monster, Beyblade, Samurai Champloo, Bakugan, Gintama, Higurashi When They Cry and Gurren Lagann.

Children’s animated programs from Nickelodeon, Cartoon Network, Disney Channel, Playhouse Disney and PBS Kids and others debuting and achieving popularity in that decade included SpongeBob SquarePants, Avatar: The Last Airbender, Teen Titans, Maya & Miguel, Dora the Explorer, Kim Possible, Teenage Mutant Ninja Turtles, Handy Manny, Phineas and Ferb, The Fairly OddParents, The Adventures of Jimmy Neutron, Boy Genius, Ben 10, Total Drama, Totally Spies!, Winx Club, Bratz, Go, Diego, Go!, Danny Phantom, The Proud Family, The Backyardigans, Little Einsteins, Clifford the Big Red Dog, Mickey Mouse Clubhouse, Samurai Jack, Invader Zim, Arthur, Curious George, Codename: Kids Next Door, LazyTown and Star Wars: The Clone Wars.

Sports channels

The WWE made a split in 2002 for the brands Raw and Smackdown!, also known as the WWE Brand Extension. This resulted in the WWE's purchase of their two biggest competitors, WCW and ECW. The brand extension would last until 2011. It also saw the rise of popular wrestlers like John Cena, Randy Orton, Dave Bautista, Jeff Hardy, CM Punk, Chris Jericho, Edge and Brock Lesnar. The match between veteran wrestlers Ric Flair and Shawn Michaels at WrestleMania 24 in 2008 was named as the "match of the decade" by popular professional wrestling magazine Pro Wrestling Illustrated. Pro Wrestling Illustrated would also name veteran wrestler Triple H as the wrestler of the decade.

The 2001 World Series between the New York Yankees and Arizona Diamondbacks became the first World Series to be played in the wake of the September 11 attacks. Super Bowl XXXVI between the New England Patriots and the St. Louis Rams became the first Super Bowl to be played in the wake of the September 11 attacks.

Criticism and controversy

Super Bowl XXXVIII halftime show controversy: Super Bowl XXXVIII, which was broadcast live on February 1, 2004, from Houston, Texas, on the CBS television network in the United States, was noted for a controversial halftime show in which singer Janet Jackson's breast, adorned with a nipple shield, was exposed by singer Justin Timberlake for about half a second, in what was later referred to as a "wardrobe malfunction". The incident, sometimes referred to as Nipplegate, was widely discussed. Along with the rest of the halftime show, it led to an immediate crackdown and widespread debate on perceived indecency in broadcasting.

The X Factor in the UK has been subject to much controversy and criticism since its launch in September 2004. The Jeremy Kyle Show, which launched a year later on the same network, ITV, was met with similar controversy. Both shows were cancelled in 2019, The X Factor due to low ratings, and in the case of The Jeremy Kyle Show due to the suicide of a recent participant on the programme.

January 2005 – Jerry Springer: The Opera was the subject of controversy, when its UK television broadcast on BBC Two elicited 55,000 complaints. It was, at the time, the most complained about television event in the country ever, a record that is now held by ITV's Good Morning Britain.

In May 2005, UK viewers inundated the Advertising Standards Authority with complaints regarding the continuous airing of the latest Crazy Frog advertisements. The intensity of the advertising was unprecedented in British television history. According to The Guardian, Jamster bought 73,716 spots across all TV channels in May alone — an average of nearly 2,378 slots daily — at a cost of about £8 million, just under half of which was spent on ITV. 87% of the population saw the Crazy Frog adverts an average of 26 times, 15% of the adverts appeared twice during the same advertising break and 66% were in consecutive ad breaks. An estimated 10% of the population saw the advert more than 60 times. This led to many members of the population finding the crazy frog, as its original name suggests, immensely irritating.

Blue Peter (the world's longest-running children's television programme) rigged a phone-in competition supporting the UNICEF "Shoe Biz Appeal" on November 27, 2006. The person who appeared to be calling in the competition was actually a Blue Peter Team Player who was visiting that day. The visitor pretended to be a caller from an outside line who had won the phone-in and the chance to select a prize. The competition was rigged due to a technical error with receiving the calls. In July 2007, Blue Peter was given a £50,000 fine, by the Office of Communications (OFCOM) as a result of rigging the competition.

I'm a Celebrity... Get Me Out of Here! is a reality television game show series, originally created in the United Kingdom, and licensed globally to other countries. In its 2009 series, celebrity chef Gino D'Acampo killed, cooked and ate a rat. The Australian RSPCA investigated the incident and sought to prosecute D'Acampo and actor Stuart Manning for animal cruelty after this episode of the show was aired. ITV was fined £1,600 and the two celebrities involved were not prosecuted for animal cruelty despite being charged with the offense by the New South Wales Police.

==== Ended series ====
The PBS series Mister Rogers' Neighborhood aired its final episode on August 31, 2001. Two years later, its host and creator, Fred Rogers, died from stomach cancer.

Law & Order was a police procedural drama that premiered on NBC on September 13, 1990, and ran for 20 seasons. The show aired its series finale ("Rubber Room") on May 24, 2010, but later returned on February 24, 2022.

Tomorrow's World was a long-running BBC television series, showcasing new developments in the world of science and technology. First aired on July 7, 1965, on BBC1, it ran for 38 years until it was cancelled in early 2003.

That '70s Show was an American television period sitcom based on the 1970s decade. The 1970s retro style permeated the 2000s decade. The show ended on May 18, 2006.

Brookside is a British soap opera set in Liverpool, England, particularly well known for showcasing topics that were considered taboo in English culture at the time, such as being the first television programme in the UK to show a lesbian kiss before the 9pm watershed. The series began on the launch night of Channel 4 on November 2, 1982, and ran for 21 years until November 4, 2003.

In January 2004, the BBC cancelled the Kilroy show (which had run for 18 years), after an article entitled 'We owe Arabs nothing' written by its host Robert Kilroy-Silk was published in the Sunday Express tabloid newspaper.

Friends is an American sitcom which aired on NBC from September 22, 1994, to May 6, 2004. Friends received positive reviews throughout its run, and its series finale ("The Last One") ranked as the fifth most watched overall television series finale as well as the most watched single television episode of the 2000s on U.S. television.

The X-Files was a science fiction television series which aired for nine seasons on Fox that premiered on September 10, 1993. The show aired its series finale ("The Truth") on May 19, 2002.

Frasier, a spin-off TV series of Cheers (that ended in 1993), is an American sitcom that was broadcast on NBC for eleven seasons from September 16, 1993, to May 13, 2004, (only a week after the broadcast of the final episode of Friends). It was one of the most successful spin-off and popular series in television history, as well as one of the most critically acclaimed comedy series.

On June 20, 2006, after 42 years, British music chart show Top of the Pops was formally cancelled and it was announced that the last edition would be broadcast on July 30, 2006.

Grandstand is a British television sport program. Broadcast between 1958 and 2007, it was one of the BBC's longest running sports shows.

After 30 years, British television drama series Grange Hill (originally made by the BBC) was cancelled and the last episode was shown on September 15, 2008.

ER is a medical drama that premiered on NBC on September 19, 1994, and ran for 15 seasons. The show aired its series finale ("And in the End...") on April 2, 2009.

==== Series returns ====
The Flower Pot Men is a British children's programme, produced by BBC television, first transmitted in 1952, and repeated regularly for more than twenty years, which was produced in a new version in 2000.

Absolutely Fabulous, also known as Ab Fab, is a British sitcom. The show has had an extended and sporadic run. The first three series were broadcast on the BBC from 1992 to 1995, followed by a series finale in the form of a two-part television film entitled The Last Shout in 1996. Its creator Jennifer Saunders revived the show for a fourth series in 2001.

Gadget & the Gadgetinis is a spinoff of the classic series Inspector Gadget (1983–1986), developed by DiC in cooperation with Haim Saban's SIP Animation and produced from 2001 to 2003. There are 52 episodes.

Basil Brush from 1962 to 1984, The Basil Brush Show from 2002 to 2007. Basil Brush is a fictional anthropomorphic red fox, best known for his appearances on daytime British children's television. He is primarily portrayed by a glove puppet.

Shooting Stars is a British television comedy panel game broadcast on BBC Two as a pilot in 1993, then as 3 full series from 1995 to 1997, then on BBC Choice from January to December 2002 with 2 series before returning to BBC Two for another 3 series from 2008 until its cancellation in 2011.

Doctor Who is a British science fiction television programme produced by the BBC. The show is a significant part of British popular culture. The programme originally ran from 1963 to 1989. After an unsuccessful attempt to revive regular production in 1996 with a backdoor pilot in the form of a television film, the programme was relaunched in 2005.

Family Fortunes is a British game show, based on the American game show Family Feud. The programme ran on ITV from January 6, 1980, to December 6, 2002, before being revived by the same channel in 2006 under the title of All Star Family Fortunes. Revived episodes are currently being shown on ITV on Sunday evenings and have been presented by Vernon Kay since 2006.

Gladiators is a British television entertainment series, produced by LWT for ITV, and broadcast between October 10, 1992, and January 1, 2000. It is an adaptation of the American format American Gladiators. The success of the British series spawned further adaptations in Australia and Sweden. The series was revived in 2008, before again being cancelled in 2009.

Rab C. Nesbitt is a British sitcom which began in 1988. The first series began on September 27, 1990, and continued for seven more, ending on June 18, 1999, and returning with a one-off special on December 23, 2008.

Red Dwarf is a British comedy franchise which primarily comprises ten series (including a ninth mini-series named Back To Earth) of a television science fiction sitcom that aired on BBC Two between 1988 and 1993 and from 1997 to 1999 and on Dave in 2009.

Primetime Emmy Award for Best Drama

- 2000 – The West Wing
- 2001 – The West Wing
- 2002 – The West Wing
- 2003 – The West Wing
- 2004 – The Sopranos
- 2005 – Lost
- 2006 – 24
- 2007 – The Sopranos
- 2008 – Mad Men
- 2009 – Mad Men

=== Video games ===
==== Video-game hardware and software ====
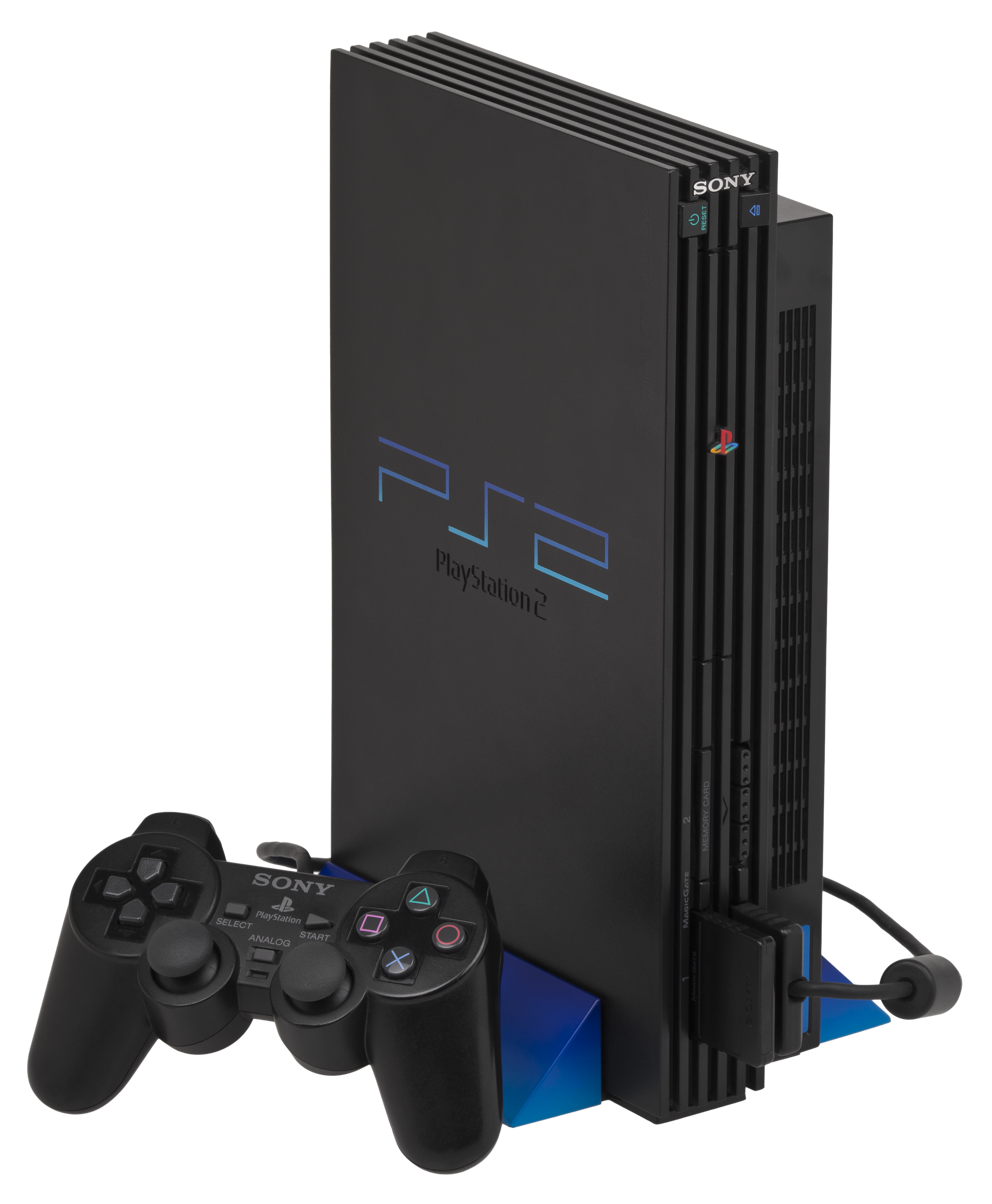
The PlayStation 2 was released in 2000 and became the best-selling gaming console of the decade and of all time.

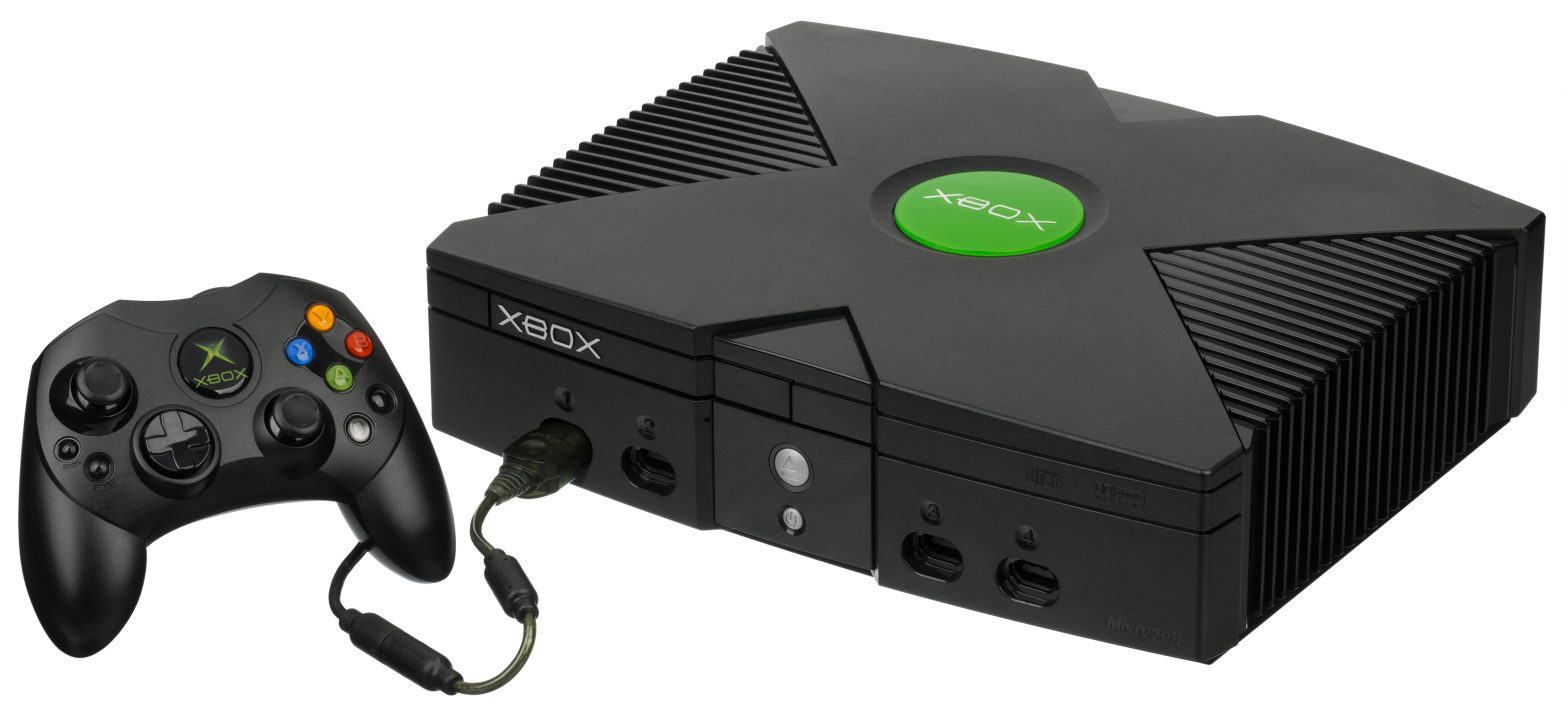
The original Xbox, released in 2001.

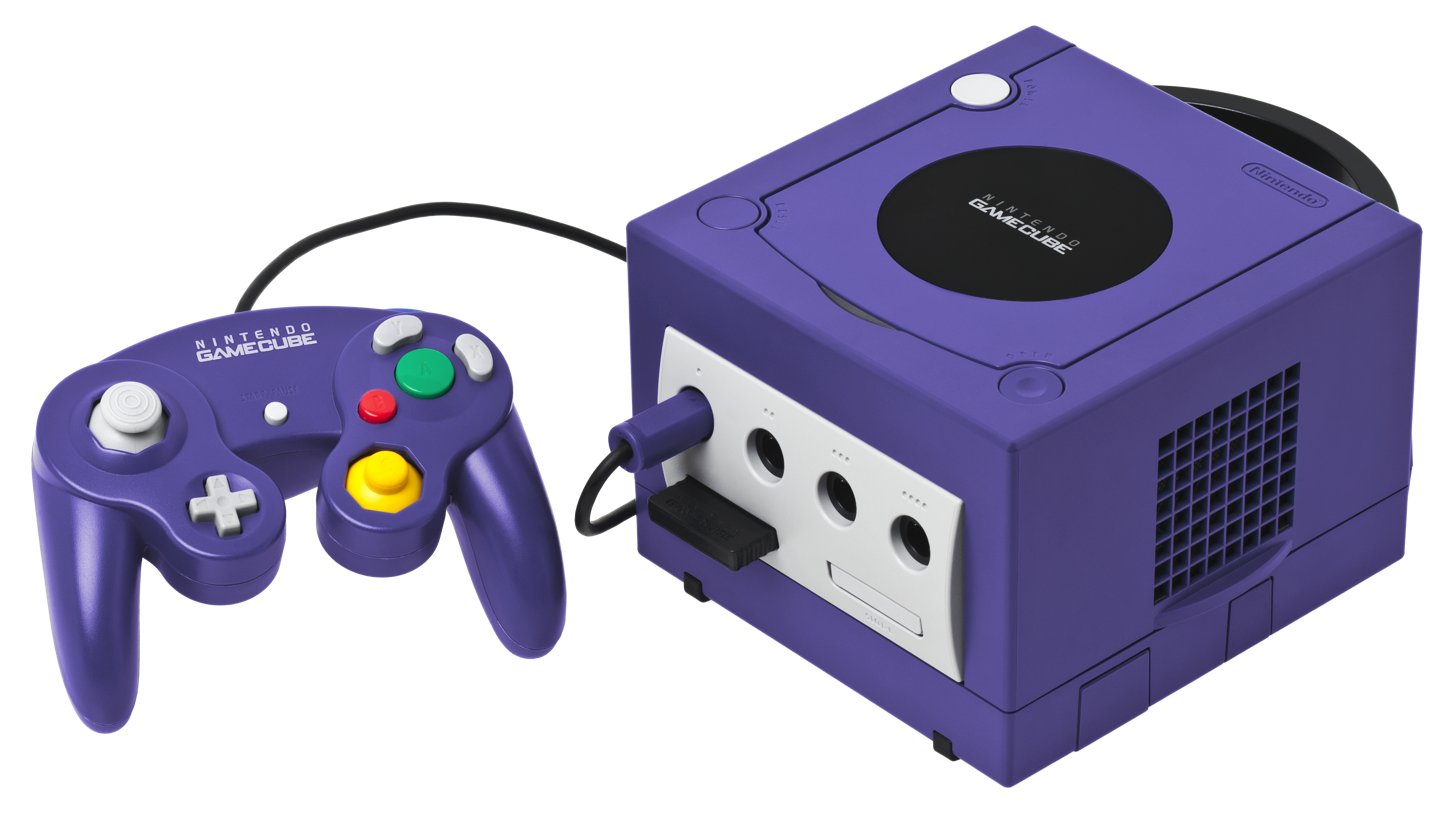
GameCube released in 2001 and is the successor to the Nintendo 64.

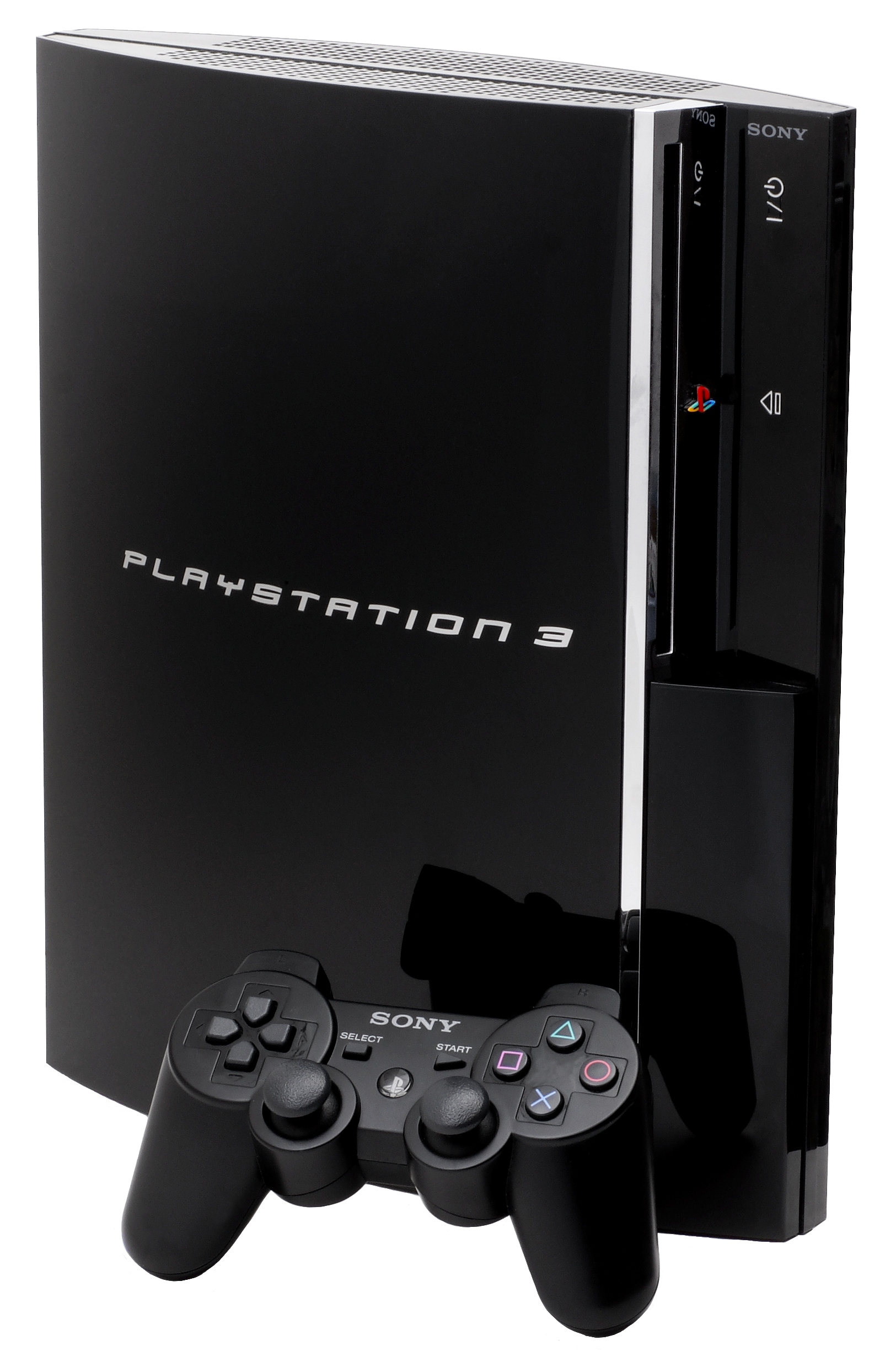
The PlayStation 3 was released in 2006.

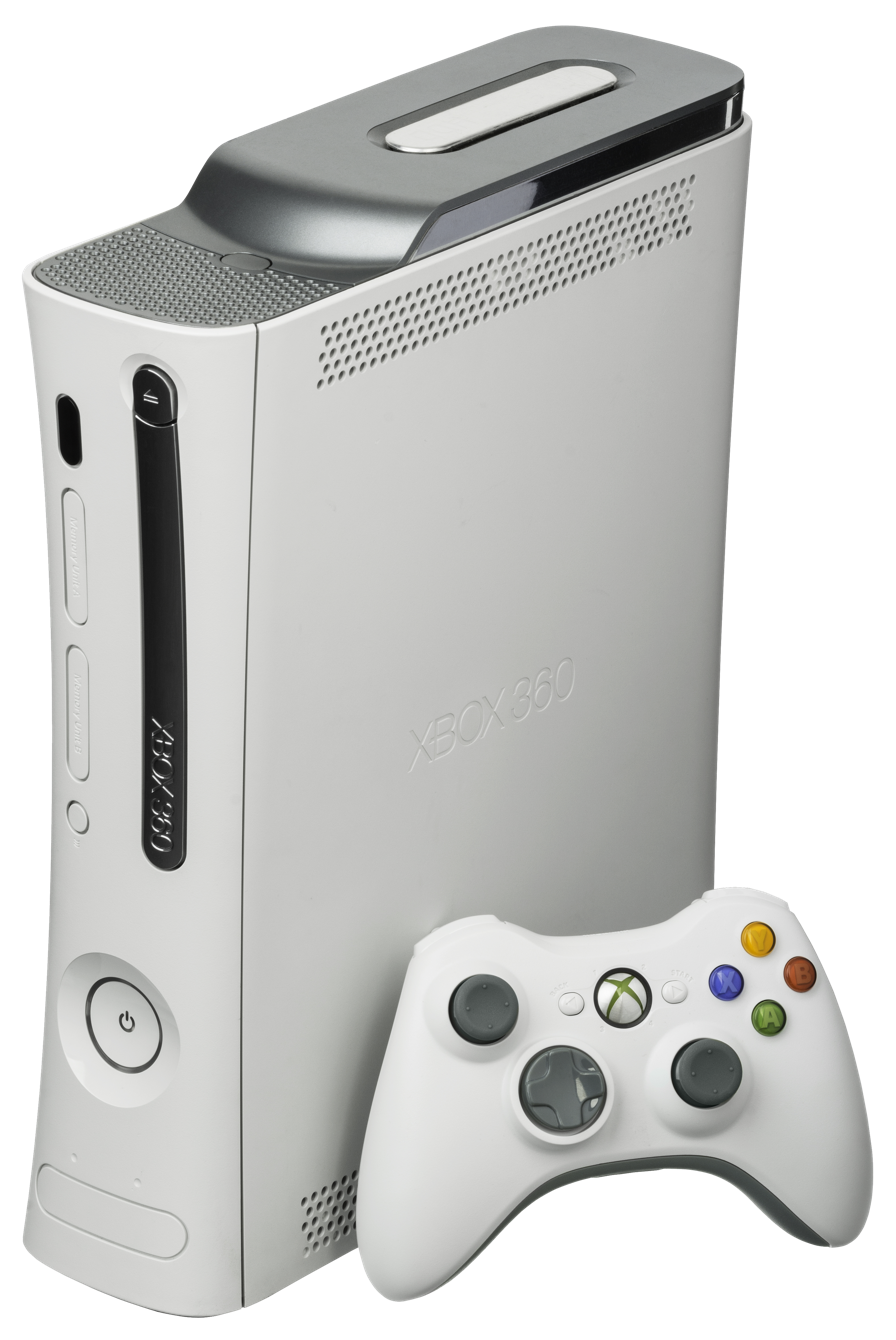
Xbox 360 released in 2005 as the successor to the original Xbox.

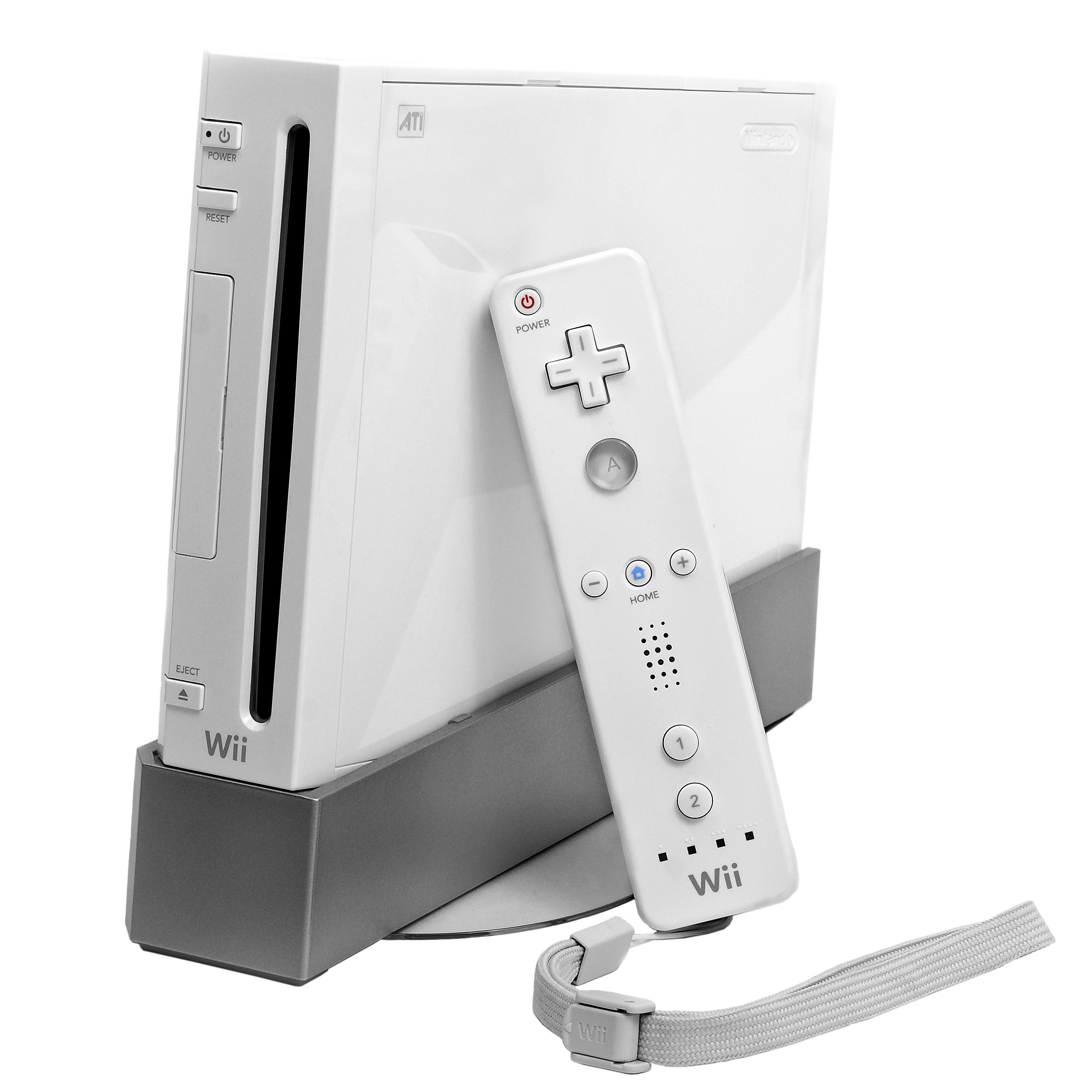
The Wii was released in 2006, as the successor to the GameCube, and is known for its motion control. It was popular in the late 2000s and early 2010s.

The world of video games reached the sixth generation of video game consoles including the PlayStation 2, the Xbox, and the GameCube, which started technically in 1998 with the release of Sega's Dreamcast, although some consider the true start in 2000 with the release of Sony's PlayStation 2. The 6th gen remained popular throughout the decade, but decreased somewhat in popularity after its 7th gen successors released technically starting in November 2005 with the release of Microsoft's Xbox 360, however, most people agree that 2006 is a 6th gen year since most games being released still released on 6th gen including the Xbox even though the 360 was already released, and the PlayStation 3 and the Wii didn't release until late 2006 which most people consider to be the true start of the 7th gen. It reached 7th Generation in the form of consoles like the Wii, the PlayStation 3 and Xbox 360 by the mid-2000s. The number-one-selling game console of the decade, the PlayStation 2, was released in 2000 and remained popular up to the end of the decade, even after the PlayStation 3 was released. The PlayStation 2 was discontinued in January 2013. The Nintendo DS launched in Japan in 2004 and by 2005 was available globally. All Nintendo DS models combined have sold over 154.02 million units, thus making it the best selling handheld of all time and the second best selling video game console of all time behind the PlayStation 2.

Neo Geo is a family of video game hardware developed by SNK. The brand originated in 1990 with the release of an arcade system, the Neo Geo MVS and its home console counterpart, the Neo Geo AES. The Neo Geo brand was officially discontinued in 2004.

MMORPGs, originating in the mid-to-late 1990s, become a popular PC trend and virtual online worlds become a reality as games such as RuneScape (2001), Final Fantasy XI (2002), Eve Online (2003), Tony Hawk's Underground (2003), World of Warcraft (2004), and EverQuest II (2004), The Lord of the Rings Online: Shadows of Angmar (2007) and Warhammer Online: Age of Reckoning (2008) are released. These worlds come complete with their own economies and social organization as directed by the players as a whole. The persistent online worlds allow the games to remain popular for years. World of Warcraft, premiered in 2004, remains one of the most popular games in PC gaming and is still being developed into the 2010s.

Arcade video games had declined in popularity so much by the late 1990s, that revenues in the United States dropped to $1.33 billion in 1999, and reached a low of $866 million in 2004. Furthermore, by the early 2000s, networked gaming via computers and then consoles across the Internet had also appeared, replacing the venue of head-to-head competition and social atmosphere once provided solely by arcades.

In the early 2000s the PlayStation 2, Xbox, and Nintendo GameCube, as well as the proliferation of 3D, open-world, and internet gaming, made a golden age of gaming. The generation was marked by games such as World of Warcraft, Halo Combat evolved, Super Smash Bros. Melee, Grand Theft Auto III, The Sims, Super Mario Sunshine, and Mario Kart: Double Dash. These consoles made these video games very popular in the early 2000s era.

Cross-platform Game engines originating in the very late-1990s, became extremely popular in the 2000s, as they allowed development for indie games for digital distribution. Noteworthy software include GameMaker and Unity. Well-known indie games made in that decade include I Wanna Be the Guy, Spelunky, Braid, Clean Asia!, Castle Crashers, World of Goo, Dino Run, The Impossible Game and Alien Hominid.

In 2003 Steam, the now leading and largest digital distribution platform for PC gaming was launched by Valve Corporation.

In the late 2000s, motion controlled video games grew in popularity, from the PlayStation 2's EyeToy to Nintendo's successful Wii console. During the decade 3D video games become the staple of the video-game industry, with 2D games nearly fading from the market. Partially 3D and fully 2D games were still common in the industry early in the decade, but these have now become rare as developers look almost exclusively for fully 3D games to satisfy the increasing demand for them in the market. An exception to this trend is the indie gaming community, which often produces games featuring 'old-school' or retro gaming elements, such as Minecraft and Shadow Complex. These games, which are not developed by the industry giants, are often available in the form of downloadable content from services such as Microsoft's Xbox Live or Apple's App Store and usually cost much less than more major releases. The video games released in the 2000s included (among others) Halo 3, Portal, Mass Effect, Super Smash Bros. Brawl, Mario Kart Wii, and BioShock.

==== Prominent video games ====
The Grand Theft Auto series sparked a fad of Mature-rated video games based on including gang warfare, drug use, and perceived "senseless violence" into gameplay. Though violent video games date back to the early 1990s, they became much more common after 2000. Despite the controversy, the 2004 game Grand Theft Auto: San Andreas became the best selling PlayStation 2 game of all time, with 17.33 million copies sold for that console alone, from a total of 21.5 million in all formats by 2009; as of 2011, 27.5 million copies of San Andreas were sold worldwide.

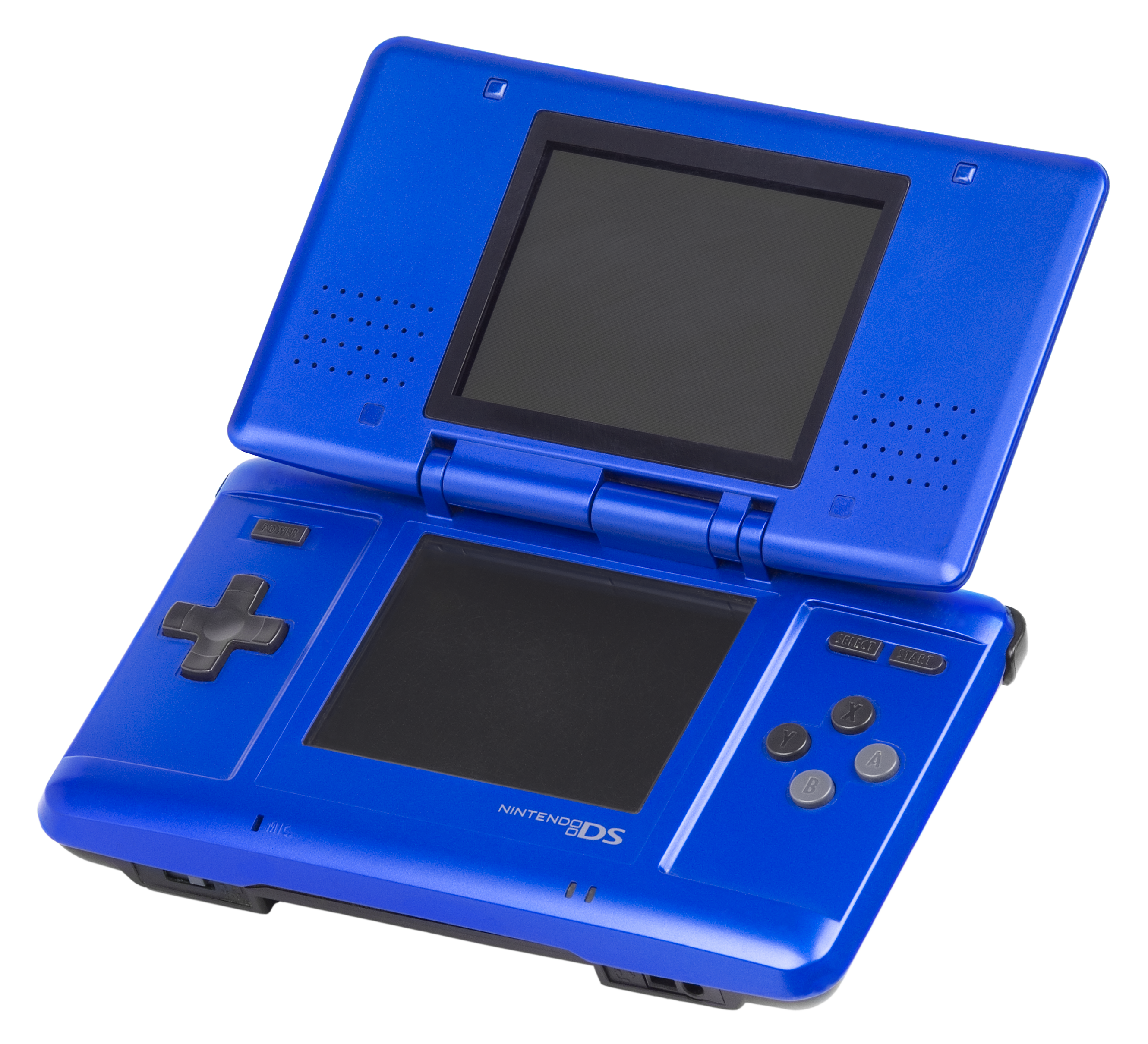
The Nintendo DS awakened an interest in casual play that had never really existed before.

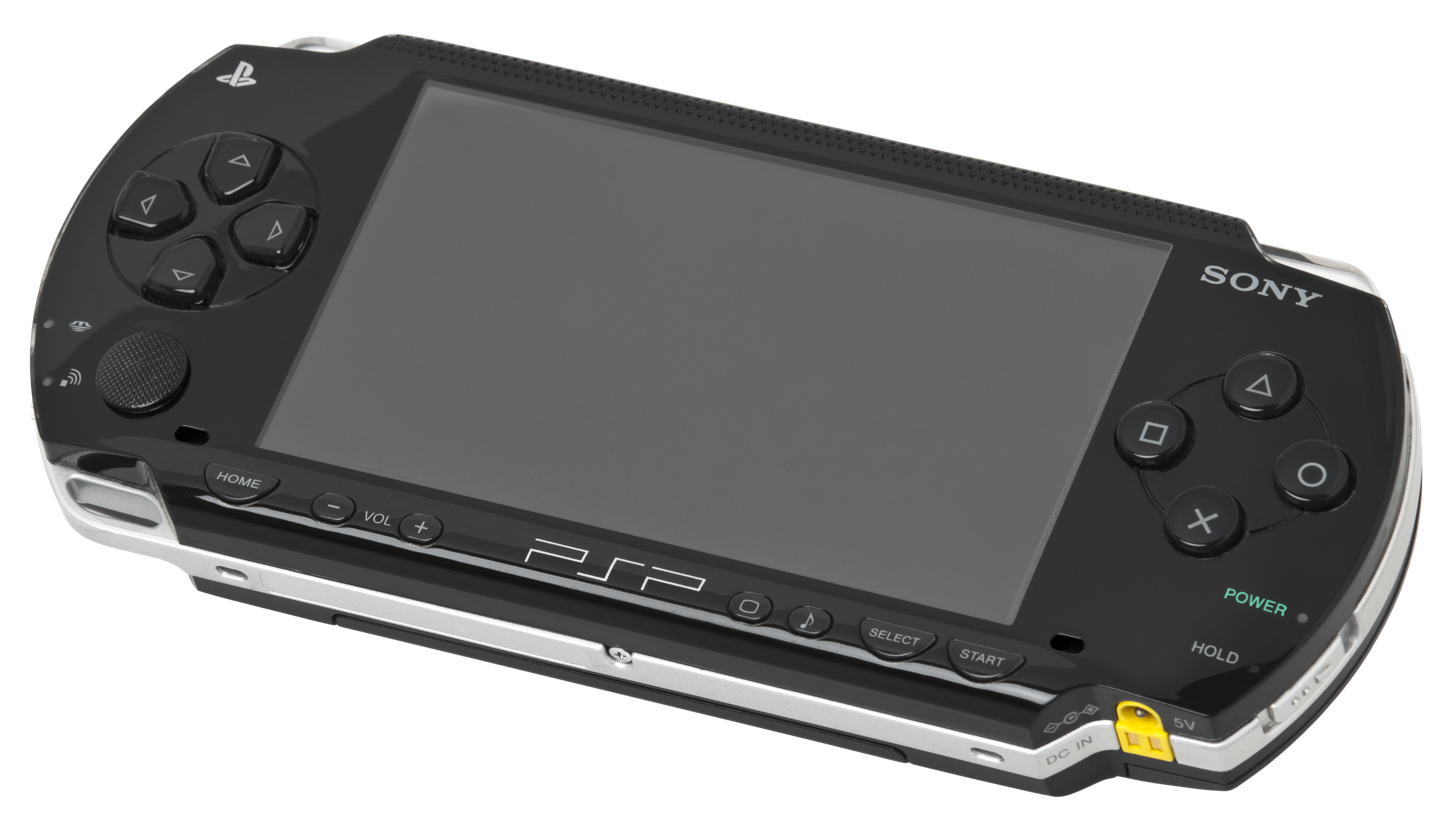
PlayStation Portable (PSP-1000) Sony handheld games console

The Call of Duty series was extremely popular during the 2000s, the diverse shooter franchise released multiple games throughout the 2000s that were positively critically reviewed and commercially successful.

The Sims series developed by Maxis became one of the most popular life simulation games series with over 200 million copies sold worldwide since the series' first game was released in 2000.

Gears of War was a critically acclaimed and commercially successful third-person shooter franchise that released two games during the mid-late 2000s. Gears of War 1 was released in 2006 and was the first installment to the franchise, it was universally critically acclaimed and went on to sell over 5 million copies. The second installment to the franchise Gears of War 2 was released in 2008 and received widespread critical acclaim and also went on to sell over 5 million copies.

The sixth generation sparked a rise in first person shooter games led by Halo: Combat Evolved, which changed the formula of the first person shooter. Halo 2 started online console gaming and was on top of the Xbox Live charts until its successor, Halo 3 (for Xbox 360), took over. Some other popular first-person shooters during the 2000s include the Medal of Honor series, with Medal of Honor: Frontline's release in 2002 bringing the first game in the series to 6th generation consoles.

Dance Dance Revolution was released in Japan and later the United States, where it became immensely popular among teenagers. Other dance games like Just Dance was released in 2009 and went on to be the most popular game from Nintendo all over the world. Another music game, Guitar Hero, was released in North America in late 2005 and had a huge cultural impact on both the music and video games industries. It became a worldwide billion-dollar franchise within three years, spawning several sequels and leading to the creation of a competing franchise, Rock Band.

==== Gaming industry ====
Worldwide, arcade game revenues gradually increased from $1.8 billion in 1998 to $3.2 billion in 2002, rivalling PC game sales of $3.2 billion that same year. In particular, arcade video games are a thriving industry in China, where arcades are widespread across the country. The US market has also experienced a slight resurgence, with the number of video game arcades across the nation increasing from 2,500 in 2003 to 3,500 in 2008, though this is significantly less than the 10,000 arcades in the early 1980s. As of 2009, a successful arcade game usually sells around 4000 to 6000 units worldwide.

Japanese media giant Nintendo released 9 out of the 10 top selling games of the 2000s, further establishing the company's dominance over the market.

Sega Corporation, usually styled as SEGA, is a Japanese multinational video game software developer and an arcade software and hardware development company headquartered in Japan, with various offices around the world. Sega previously developed and manufactured its own brand of home video game consoles from 1983 to 2001, but a restructure was announced on January 31, 2001, that ceased continued production of its existing home console (Dreamcast), effectively exiting the company from the home console business. In spite of that, SEGA would go on to produce several videogames such as Super Monkey Ball franchise, the Sega Ages 2500 PlayStation 2 games, Hatsune Miku: Project DIVA, Sonic Adventure 2, Sonic Heroes, Rez, Shadow the Hedgehog, Virtua Fighter 4, After Burner Climax, Valkyria Chronicles, Sonic Pinball Party, Bayonetta, Jet Set Radio, Puyo Pop Fever, Thunder Force VI, Shenmue II, Phantasy Star Online, Yakuza 2, Gunstar Super Heroes, Astro Boy: Omega Factor, OutRun 2006: Coast 2 Coast and Mario & Sonic at the Olympic Games.

==== Game of the Year ====
from the Game Developers Choice Awards starting in 2001 (awards are given to games of the previous calendar year).

- 2000 – The Sims
- 2001 – Grand Theft Auto III
- 2002 – Grand Theft Auto: Vice City
- 2003 – Tony Hawk's Underground
- 2004 – Grand Theft Auto: San Andreas
- 2005 – Grand Theft Auto: Liberty City Stories
- 2006 – Grand Theft Auto: Vice City Stories
- 2007 – Portal
- 2008 – Fallout 3
- 2009 – Uncharted 2: Among Thieves

Best selling games of every year

In some years, sources disagree on the best-selling game.

- 2000: Pokémon Stadium or Pokémon Crystal
- 2001: Madden NFL 2002 or Grand Theft Auto III
- 2002: Grand Theft Auto: Vice City
- 2003: Madden NFL 2004 or Tony Hawk's Underground
- 2004: Grand Theft Auto: San Andreas
- 2005: Madden NFL 06 or Grand Theft Auto: Liberty City Stories
- 2006: Madden NFL 07 or Grand Theft Auto: Vice City Stories
- 2007: Guitar Hero III: Legends of Rock or Wii Sports
- 2008: Rock Band or Wii Play
- 2009: Call of Duty: Modern Warfare 2 or Wii Sports

=== Theater ===
Theater plays and musicals from the decade include Wicked, War Horse, Billy Elliot: The Musical, Hairspray, The Producers, and Spamalot.

=== Writing ===
- The decade saw the rise of digital media as opposed to the use of print, and the steady decline of printed books in countries where e-readers had become available.
- The deaths of John Updike, Hunter S. Thompson, and other authors marked the end of various major writing careers influential during the late 20th century.
- Popular book series such as Harry Potter, Twilight and Dan Brown's "Robert Langdon" (consisting of Angels & Demons, The Da Vinci Code, and The Lost Symbol) saw increased interest in various genres such as fantasy, romance, vampire fiction, and detective fiction, as well as young adult fiction in general.
- Manga (also known as Japanese comics) became popular among the international audience, mostly in English-speaking countries. Such popular manga works include Lucky Star, Fullmetal Alchemist and Naruto.
- On July 19, 2001, English author and former politician, Jeffrey Archer, was found guilty of perjury and perverting the course of justice at a 1987 libel trial. He was sentenced to four years' imprisonment.
- Peter Pan in Scarlet is a novel by Geraldine McCaughrean. It is an official sequel to Scottish author and dramatist J. M. Barrie's Peter and Wendy, authorised by Great Ormond Street Hospital, to whom Barrie granted all rights to the character and original writings in 1929. McCaughrean was selected following a competition launched in 2004, in which novelists were invited to submit a sample chapter and plot outline.
- J. K. Rowling was the best-selling author in the decade overall thanks to the Harry Potter book series, although she did not pen the best-selling book (at least in the UK), being second to The Da Vinci Code, which had 5.2 million in the UK by 2009 and 80 million worldwide by 2012.

=== Sports ===
Major sporting events

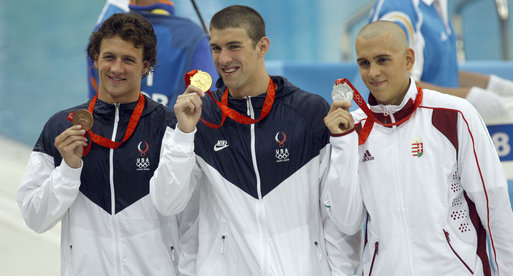
Michael Phelps holds his gold medal on the podium during the 2008 Olympics. Pictured with Ryan Lochte (left) and László Cseh (right)

The Sydney 2000 Summer Olympics, followed the centennial anniversary of the modern era Olympic Games, held in Atlanta in 1996. The Athens 2004 Summer Olympics, were a strong symbol, for modern Olympic Games were inspired by the competitions organized in Ancient Greece. Finally, the Beijing Games saw the emergence of China as a major sports power, with the highest number of titles for the first time. The 2002 Salt Lake City and the 2006 Turin Winter Olympic Games were also major events, though slightly less popular.

Association football's important events included two World Cups, one organized in South Korea and Japan, which saw Brazil win a record fifth title, and the other in Germany, which saw Italy win its fourth title. The regional competitions, the Copa América and UEFA European Championship, saw five nations rising the cup: Colombia (2001) and Brazil (2004, 2007) won the Copa América, while France (2000), Greece (2004) and Spain (2008) won the European Championship.

In 2001, after the 9/11 attacks, both the National Football League and Major League Baseball canceled their upcoming games for a week. As a result, the World Series would be played in November for the first time and the Super Bowl would be played in February for the first time.

The expansion and rise of the Ultimate Fighting Championship (UFC) occurred after the airing of The Ultimate Fighter in 2005.

Rugby increased in size and audience, as the Rugby World Cup became the third most watched sporting event in the world with the 2007 Rugby World Cup organized in France.

Bloodgate is the nickname for a rugby union scandal involving the English team Harlequins in their Heineken Cup match against the Irish side Leinster on April 12, 2009. It was so called because of the use of fake blood capsules, and has been seen by some as one of the biggest scandals in rugby since professionalization in the mid-1990s, indeed even as an argument against the professional ethos. The name is a pun on Watergate.

The New York Yankees won the first Major League Baseball World Series of the decade in 2000, as well as the last World Series of the decade in 2009. The Boston Red Sox won their first World Series since 1918 in 2004 and then again in 2007.

The Pittsburgh Steelers won a record sixth Super Bowl on February 1, 2009, against the Arizona Cardinals. Pittsburgh's Super Bowl win would remain the championship record for an NFL franchise until a decade later when the New England Patriots defeated the Los Angeles Rams to tie the Super Bowl championship record.

Athletes

One of the most prominent events of the 2008 Summer Olympics held in Beijing was the achievement of Michael Phelps the American swimmer, frequently cited as the greatest swimmer and one of the greatest Olympians of all time. He has won 14 career Olympic gold medals, the most by any Olympian. As of August 2, 2009, Phelps has broken thirty-seven world records in swimming. Phelps holds the record for the most gold medals won in a single Olympics, his eight at the 2008 Beijing Games surpassed American swimmer Mark Spitz's seven-gold performance at Munich in 1972.

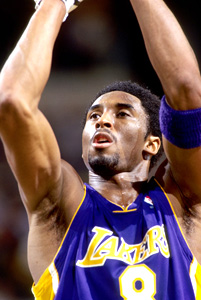
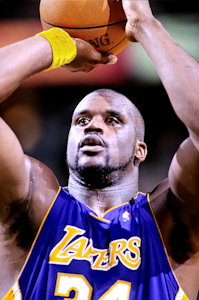
Kobe Bryant (left) and Shaquille O'Neal both helped the Lakers three-peat during the early 2000s.

Usain Bolt of Jamaica dominated the male sprinting events at the Beijing Olympics, in which he broke three world records, allowing him to be the first man to ever accomplish this at a single Olympic game. He holds the world record for the 100 metres (despite slowing down before the finish line to celebrate), the 200 metres and, along with his teammates, the 4 × 100 metres relay.

The Los Angeles Lakers won 3 NBA championships in a row from 2000 to 2002, also known as a Three-peat, led by Kobe Bryant and Shaquille O'Neal.

In 2003, Michael Jordan retired from the NBA after two seasons with the Washington Wizards, the official NBA website reading in 2006: "By acclamation, Michael Jordan is the greatest basketball player of all time."

Popular extreme sports athletes of the decade included Tony Hawk, Shaun White, Kelly Slater, Travis Pastrana, Matt Hoffman, Shaun Murray, Sarah Burke, and more.

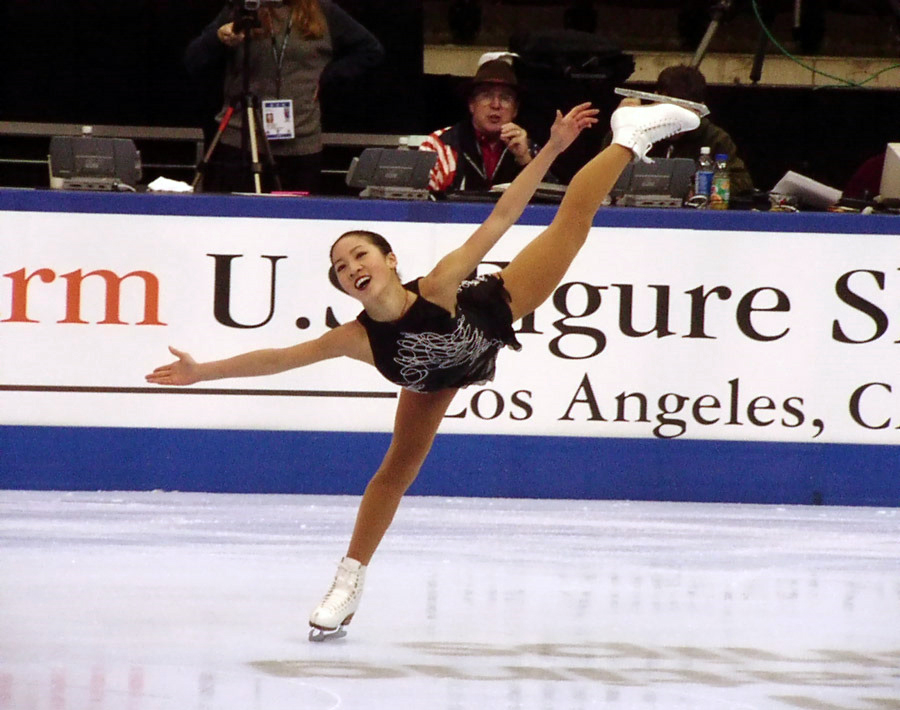
Michelle Kwan performing in the 2002 U.S. Figure Skating Championships

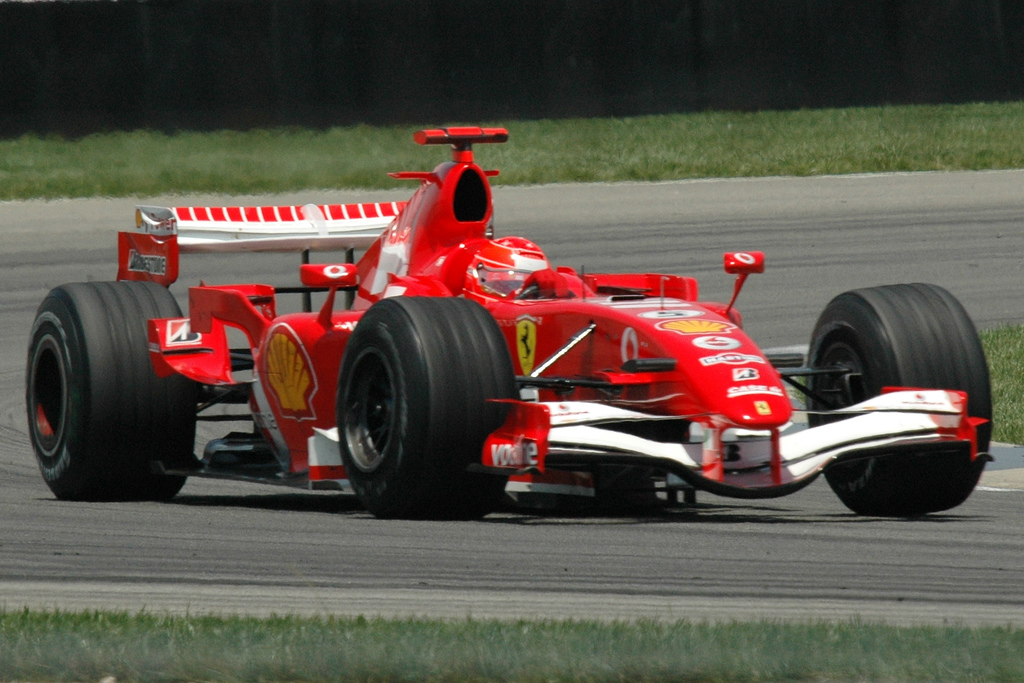
Michael Schumacher dominated the majority of the decade winning five consecutive Formula One world championships.

Towards the middle of the decade, Michelle Kwan became the most decorated figure skater in U.S. history.

Michael Schumacher, the most titled F1 driver, won five F1 World Championships during the decade and finally retired in 2006, yet eventually confirming his come-back to F1 for 2010. Lance Armstrong won all the Tour de France between 1999 and 2005, also an all-time record, but was later stripped of all his titles when evidence emerged of his use of performance-enhancing drugs. Swiss tennis player Roger Federer won 16 Grand Slam titles to become the most titled player.

Timeline of sporting events

In May 2004, Arsenal became the only top-tier team to go through an entire league season (2003/4) unbeaten when they won the English Premier League and became 'The Invincibles'. This feat had also been achieved in the 19th century, when the league was in its infancy and there were far fewer matches in a season, but not in the modern era. Arsenal's unbeaten run extended to 49 matches in total, and into the subsequent season.

In September 2004, Chelsea footballer Adrian Mutu failed a drugs test for cocaine and was released on October 29, 2004. He also received a seven-month ban and a £20,000 fine from The Football Association.

The 2006 Italian football scandal, also known as "Calciopoli", involved Italy's top professional football leagues, Serie A and Serie B. The scandal was uncovered in May 2006 by Italian police, implicating league champions Juventus, and other major teams including A.C. Milan, Fiorentina, Lazio and Reggina when a number of telephone interceptions showed a thick network of relations between team managers and referee organisations. Juventus were the champions of Serie A at the time. The teams have been accused of rigging games by selecting favourable referees.

The 2006 FIFA World Cup Final in Berlin, Zinedine Zidane widely considered by experts and fans as one of the greatest football players of all time, was sent off in the 110th minute of the game, which was to be the last match of his career. After headbutting Marco Materazzi in the chest, Zidane did not participate in the penalty shootout, which Italy won 5–3. It was later discovered through interviews that Materazzi had insulted Zidane's mother and sister that last moment which is what led to Zidane's heightened anger and reaction.

January 11, 2007 – When English footballer David Beckham joined the Major League Soccer's Los Angeles Galaxy, he was given the highest player salary in the league's history; with his playing contract with the Galaxy over the next three years being worth US$6.5 million per year.

October 2007 – US world champion track and field athlete Marion Jones admitted that she took performance-enhancing drugs as far back as the 2000 Summer Olympics, and that she had lied about it to a grand jury investigating performance-enhancer creations.

November 29, 2007 – Portsmouth football manager Harry Redknapp angrily denied any wrongdoing after being arrested by police investigating alleged corruption in football: "If you are telling me this is how you treat anyone, it is not the society I grew up in."

The 2008 Wimbledon final between Roger Federer of Switzerland and Rafael Nadal of Spain, has been lauded as the greatest match ever by tennis analysts.

British Formula One racing driver Lewis Hamilton, was disqualified from the 2009 Australian Grand Prix for providing "misleading evidence" during the stewards' hearing. He later privately apologised to FIA race director Charlie Whiting for having lied to the stewards.

In 2009, the World football transfer record was set by Spanish football club Real Madrid when it purchased Manchester United's Cristiano Ronaldo for £80 million (€93 million). Manchester United veteran Bobby Charlton said the world-record offer shocked him:

"It's a lot of money, it's crazy really. If you want to be in the race, you have to pay the price, it seems sometimes a little bit vulgar."

Controversies in sports

A number of concerns and controversies over the 2008 Summer Olympics surfaced before, during, and after the 2008 Summer Olympics, and which received major media coverage. Leading up to the Olympics, there were concerns about human rights in China, such that many high-profile individuals, such as politicians and celebrities, announced intentions to boycott the games to protest China's role in the Darfur conflict, and Myanmar, its stance towards Tibet, or other aspects of its human rights record. In a 2008 Time article entitled "Why Nobody's Boycotting Beijing", Vivienne Walt wrote: 'Leaders in power are more mindful of China's colossal clout in an increasingly shaky world economy, and therefore of the importance of keeping good relations with its government.'

Ron Atkinson, is an English former football player and manager. In recent years he has become one of Britain's best-known football pundits. Ron Atkinson's media work came to an abrupt halt on April 21, 2004, when he was urged to resign from ITV by Brian Barwick after he broadcast a racial remark live on air about the black Chelsea player Marcel Desailly; believing the microphone to be switched off, he said, "...he [Desailly] is what is known in some schools as a lazy nigger".

Steroids also spread the sports world throughout the decade, mainly used in Major League Baseball. Players involved included Barry Bonds, Mark McGwire, Sammy Sosa and Alex Rodriguez.

The sport of fox hunting is controversial, particularly in the UK, where it was banned in Scotland in 2002, and in England and Wales in November 2004 (law enforced from February 2005), though shooting foxes as vermin remained legal around the world.

== See also ==
- List of decades, centuries, and millennia
- 2000s in music
- 2000s in fashion
- 2000s in television
- 2000s in science and technology
- 2000s in video gaming
- List of years in literature § 2000s
- Post–Cold War era

=== Timeline ===
The following articles contain brief timelines which list the most prominent events of the decade:

- 2000
- 2001
- 2002
- 2003
- 2004
- 2005
- 2006
- 2007
- 2008
- 2009
